= Panchpokhari Thangpal Rural Municipality =

Rural municipality in Bagmati province, Nepal

Panchpokhari Thangpal Gaunpalika पाँचपोखरी थाङ्गपाल गाउँपालिका
- Rural Municipality
- Panchpokhari Thangpal Rural Municipality
- Location in Nepal Panchpokhari Thangpal Gaunpalika (Nepal)
- Coordinates: 27.91°N 85.64°E
- Country: Nepal
- Province: Bagmati
- District: Sindhupalchowk
- Established: 10 March 2017

Government
  - Type: RM
  - CHM: Mr. Tasi Lama
  - Vice-CHM: Mrs. Sunita Adhikari
  - (MP) SPC-2: Sher Bahadur Tamang (NCP)
  - (MLA) SPC-2(B): Nima Lama (Congress)

Area
  - Total: 187.29 km^{2} (72.31 sq mi)

Population (2011)
  - Total: 20,986
  - Density: 112.05/km^{2} (290.21/sq mi)
  - Ethinc Castes: Tamang Chhetri and others
  - Household: 5,007
- Time zone: UTC+5:45 (Nepal Standard Time)
- Website: Official Website
- SPC-2=Sindhupalchowk-2*; CHM=Chairperson*

Panchpokhari Thangpal (Nepali: पाँचपोखरी थाङपाल गाउँपालिका) is a rural municipality located in Sindhupalchok District of Bagmati Province of Nepal. The RM is surrounded by Jugal in the East, Helambu in the West, Rasuwa District covers from North and Melamchi and Indrawati falls in South of the RM.

Panchpokhari Thangpal is a rural local level unit which was established according to the restructure of Nepal in 2017. On 10 March 2017 Government of Nepal announced 744 local level units and 9 later, total 753 local level units as per the new constitution of Nepal 2015. The RM is divided into total 8 wards and total area of the rural municipality is 187.29 square kilometres (72.31 sq mi). Total population of the RM is 20986 individuals according to the 2011 Nepal census. Banskharka, Baruwa, Bhotang, Thangpalkot, Gunsa, Thampaldhap, Bhote Namlang and Langarche the previous local level units (VDCs) were merged to form this new local level unite.

== Constituencies ==
There are 2 Parliamentary constituencies and 4 Provincial constituencies in Sindhupalchowk District. Panchpokhari falls under Parliamentary Constituency (Sindhupalchowk-2) and Provincial Constituency (Sindhupalchowk-2(B)). MP of Sindhupalchowk-2 constituency is Sher Bahadur Tamang (Nepal Communist Party) and MLA of Sindhupalchowk-2(B) is Nima Lama (Nepali Congress Party).

There are 21 voting booths and 15682 voters in the RM.

Seat Type	Constituency	MLA/MP
Parliamentary	Sindhupalchowk-2	Sher Bahadur Tamang
Provincial	Sindhupalchowk-2 (B)	Nima Lama

== Demographics ==
Total population of Panchpokhari RM is 20986 in which 10693 are Male and 10293 are Female. Number of Household is 5007. Most of the population of the RM follows Buddhism (67%) and second most following religion is Hinduism (31%). Tamang Language is the mostly spoken language in the RM and Nepali language is second mostly spoken language. The Largest ethnic caste is Tamang of the RM and Chhetris are second largest ethnic caste. Education percentage in the RM is low, only 46.03% of people are educated.
