= Sunkoshi Rural Municipality, Sindhupalchok =

Rural Municipality in Bagmati Province, Nepal

Sunkoshi सुनकोशी गाउँपालिका
- Rural Municipality
- Location in Nepal Sunkoshi (Nepal)
- Coordinates: 27.75°N 85.85°E
- Province: Bagmati Province
- District: Sindhupalchowk
- Established: 10 March 2017

Government
  - Type: Village council
  - Chairperson: Tapindra Prasad Timalsina
  - Vice chairperson: Kanchhi Lama

Area
  - Total: 72.84 km^{2} (28.12 sq mi)

Population (2011)
  - Total: 16,713
  - Density: 229.4/km^{2} (594.3/sq mi)
- Time zone: UTC+5:45 (Nepal Standard Time)
- Headquarter: Pangretar
- Website: official website

Sunkoshi Rural Municipality (Nepali: सुनकोशी गाउँपालिका) is a rural municipality in Sindhupalchowk District of Bagmati Province in Nepal. According to the 2011 Nepal census, the total population of the municipality is 16713 and total area of the municipality is 72.84 square kilometres (28.12 mi^{2}) The Rural municipality is divided into 7 wards and the headquarter of the municipality is located at Pangretar.

The rural municipality was established on March 10, 2017 when Ministry of Federal Affairs and Local Development dissolved the existing village development committees and announced the establishment of this new local body.

Thokarpa, Kalika, Thumpakhar, Sunkhani, Yamunadanda and Pangretar VDCs were merged to form the new rural municipality.
