= Bhotekoshi Rural Municipality =

Rural Municipality in Bagmati Province, Nepal

Bhotekoshi भोटेकोशी गाउँपालिका
- Rural Municipality
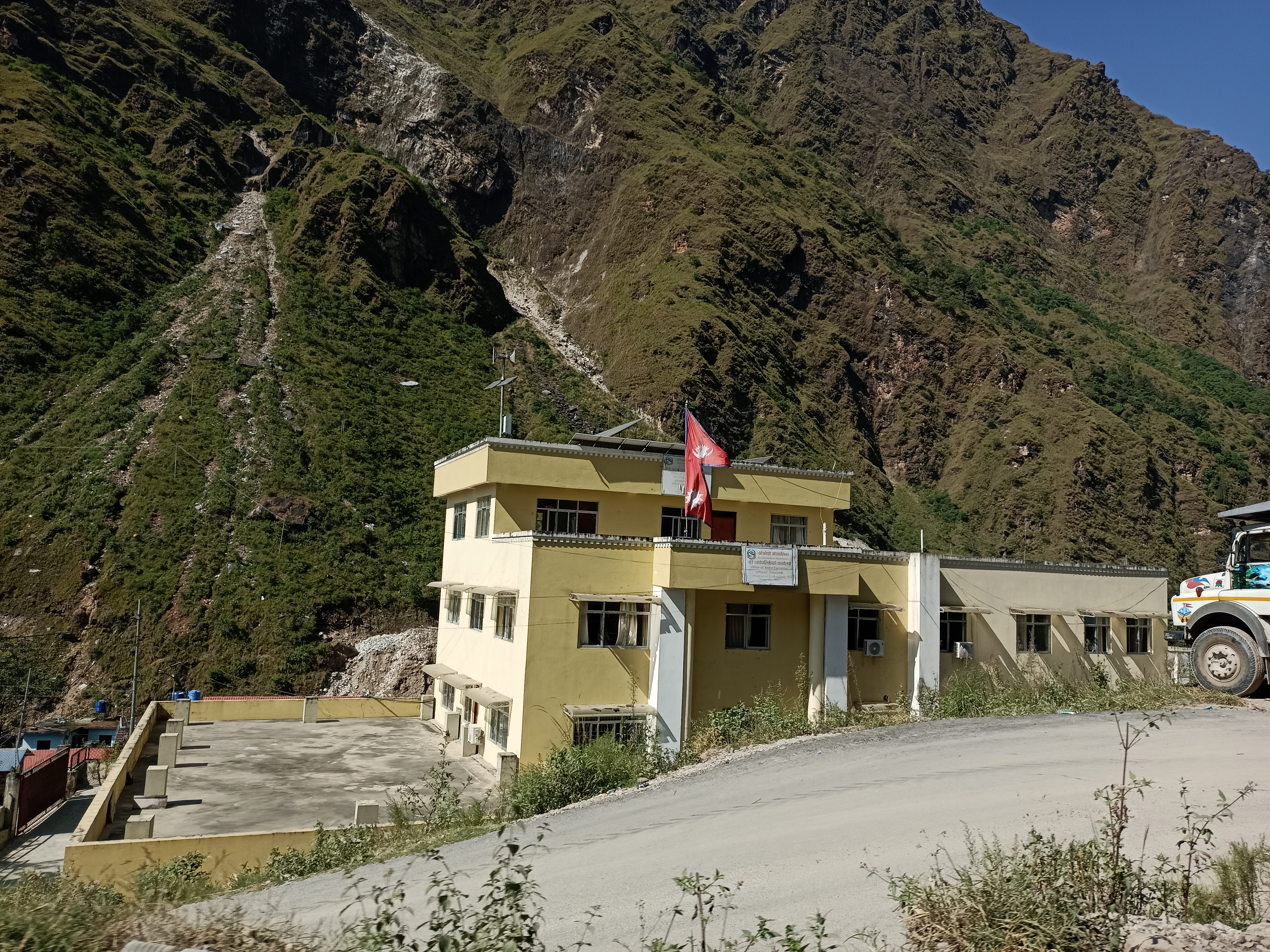
- Rural Executive Office

- Location of Bhotekoshi
- Coordinates: 27.878°N 85.981°E
- Country: Nepal
- Province: Bagmati Province
- District: Sindhupalchok
- Wards: 5
- Established: 10 March 2017

Government
  - Type: Rural Council
  - Chairperson: Mr. Pasang Nurpu Sherpa
  - Vice-chairperson: Mrs. Dichhen Sherpa

Area
  - Total: 278.31 km^{2} (107.46 sq mi)

Population (2011)
  - Total: 17,156
  - Density: 61.643/km^{2} (159.66/sq mi)
- Time zone: UTC+5:45 (Nepal Standard Time)
- Area code: 011
- Headquarter: Phulping Katti
- Website: Official Website

Bhotekoshi (Nepali: भोटेकोशी गाउँपालिका) is a rural municipality located in Sindhupalchok District of Bagmati Province in Nepal. Sindhupalchok district is divided into twelve local level units, in which three units are urban municipality and nine are rural municipality and Bhotekoshi is one of rural municipalities out of nine. It is located near the border of Tibet-China on Himalayan range. It is surrounded by Dolakha District in east, Bahrabise in south and Jugal in west. Tibet is located on the north side of the rural municipality. Total area of the rural municipality is 273.62 square kilometres (105.65 sq mi) and total population is 19231 individuals.

The rural municipality was formed on 10 March 2017, when Government of Nepal announced 753 local level units as per the new constitution of Nepal 2015, and thus the rural municipality came into existence. The municipality was formed merging following former VDCs: Listikot, Tatopani, Fulping Katti and Marming. The municipality is divided into 5 wards and the admin center of the rural municipality is located at Phulping Katti (ward no. 4).

== Places of Interest ==
- Tatopani (ward no. 2) is famous for hot springs. The name "Tatopani" itself describes the place. "Tato" means hot and Pani means water.
- Tatopani Custom Office (Kodari Custom Office) located at Kodari, (Tatopani) is the main trading office between Nepal and China. It is situated at the end of Arniko Highway.
