= Tipeni, Sindhupalchok =

Village in Bagmati Province, Nepal

Tipeni तिपेनी
- Village
- Location in Nepal
- Coordinates: 27.8903°N 85.6231°E
- Country: Nepal
- Province: Bagmati
- District: Sindhupalchok
- Rural Municipality: Panchpokhari Thangpal
- Time zone: UTC+5:45 (NST)

Tipeni (Nepali: तिपेनी) is a village located in Panchpokhari Thangpal rural municipality in Sindhupalchok District of Bagmati Province of Nepal. The aerial distance from Tipeni to Nepal's capital Kathmandu is approximately 36 km. Tipeni has an elevation of 1,189m above sea level.

== See also ==
- Panchpokhari Thangpal
