= Helambu Rural Municipality =

Helambu Rural Municipality हेलम्बु गाउँपालिका
- Rural Municipality
- Location in Nepal
- Coordinates: 28°03′N 85°32′E
- Country: Nepal
- Province: Bagmati Province
- District: Sindhupalchok District
- Established: 10 March 2017

Government
  - Type: Local Level Government
  - Chairperson: Nima Gyaljen Hyolmo

Area
  - Total: 287.26 km^{2} (110.91 sq mi)

Population (2021)
  - Total: 17,497
  - Density: 61/km^{2} (160/sq mi)
  - Ethnicities: Tamang Hyolmo/Yolmo Sherpa Chhetri Brahmin
- Time zone: UTC+5:45 (Nepal Time)
- Postal Code: 45609
- Religions: Hindu, Buddhist
- No. of wards: 7

Helambu (Nepali: हेलम्बु गाउँपालिका) is a rural municipality located in Sindhupalchok District of Bagmati Province in central Nepal. It is situated approximately 80 kilometres northeast of Kathmandu in the highland Himalayan region historically known as the Helambu valley.

The municipality consists of 7 wards and covers a geographical area of approximately 287.26 km² (110.91 sq mi), with elevations ranging from about 1,000 metres in the lower wards to over 5,000 metres in the high alpine zones bordering the Jugal Himal.

The municipality was formally established on 10 March 2017 following Nepal's restructuring of local government units under the Constitution of Nepal 2015, bringing together five former Village Development Committees (VDCs): Helambu, Kiul, Palchok, Ichok, and Mahankal. At the time of the 2021 Nepal census, it had a population of 17,497.

Helambu is internationally recognised for its trekking routes, rich Hyolmo/Yolmo Buddhist heritage, scenic Himalayan landscapes, apple orchards, and sacred religious sites. It is sometimes referred to as the City of Monasteries due to the large number of Buddhist gompas (monasteries) found throughout its settlements. The municipality is also home to Palchoki Mai Temple (Jay Bageshwari), one of the oldest Hindu temples in Sindhupalchok District and the site that is widely credited as the origin of the district's name.

== History ==
=== Early Settlement and Ancient History ===
The Helambu region has been inhabited since ancient times by the Hyolmo (also called Yolmo), Tamang, and Sherpa communities. These groups have maintained distinct cultural, linguistic, and religious traditions rooted in Tibetan Buddhist influence, and their settlements have shaped the landscape, temples, monasteries, and trade routes of the region for many centuries. In the past, the region served as an important corridor for trade between Nepal's inner Himalayan valleys and Tibet, and this sustained cultural exchange over generations profoundly shaped local traditions, language, craft, and spiritual life.

The founding of the Palchoki Mai Temple is traced by local tradition to approximately the 5th century CE, making it one of the oldest recorded sites of worship in the broader Sindhupalchok region.

The area's religious significance extended to both Hindu and Buddhist traditions, with Hindu settlers establishing temples in the lower valleys and Buddhist communities building gompas in the higher elevations.

=== Formation of the Municipality ===
Prior to 2017, the area that now forms Helambu Rural Municipality was administered as separate Village Development Committees. The former Helambu VDC (from which the municipality takes its name) was originally called Timbughyangul VDC and then Tarkeghyang Panchayat, before being renamed Helambu following the first elected VDC after the 2049 BS (1992 CE) elections. The name Timbughyangul itself is believed to contain references to the settlements of Timbu and Ghangyul within the area.

Under Nepal's federal restructuring in 2017, five former VDCs — Helambu, Kiul, Palchok, Ichok, and Mahankal — were merged to form the Helambu Rural Municipality. In the restructuring, both the Mahankal and Ichok VDCs were each divided into two wards, resulting in the current seven-ward structure. The municipality is one of 12 local governments (3 municipalities and 9 rural municipalities) within Sindhupalchok District.

== Geography ==
=== Location and Terrain ===
Helambu Rural Municipality lies in the northern part of Sindhupalchok District, approximately 80 kilometres northeast of Kathmandu. It is accessible via the Araniko Highway to Melamchi junction and then via the Melamchi–Helambu road. The elevation of the municipality ranges between roughly 1,000 metres above sea level in the lower river valleys to over 5,000 metres at the high-altitude ridges and glacial zones near the Jugal Himal.

This vertical diversity creates a range of ecosystems within the municipality's boundaries: subtropical forests in the lower zones, temperate forests of oak, pine, and rhododendron at middle elevations, and subalpine and alpine terrain above the treeline. The landscape includes deep river valleys, terraced farmlands, high ridges, glacial lakes, and mountain pastures used for seasonal yak herding.

The municipality borders Rasuwa District to the north and west, and is surrounded by other local governments of Sindhupalchok to the south and east. Key rivers flowing through the area include the Melamchi Khola (the main river), and tributaries such as the Timbu Khola and Gohore Khola, which descend from the high mountains and support both irrigation and domestic water use in the settlements below.

=== Wards and Key Settlements ===
Helambu Rural Municipality is divided into 7 wards, each corresponding to a former VDC or part of one:

Ward No.	Main Area / Former VDC	Notable Settlements
1	Helambu (former Helambu VDC)	Tarkeghyang, Sermathang, Melamchi Ghyang
2	Kiul	Srijana Basti, Ghangyul
3	Palchowk	Palchok village (site of Palchoki Mai Temple)
4	Gyalthum (former Ichok VDC part)	Gyalthum
5	Chhajogang (former Ichok VDC part)	Chhajogang
6	Ichowk (former Ichok VDC part)	Ichowk, Naya Basti
7	Mahakal (former Mahankal VDC)	Mahakal

=== Climate ===
The climate of Helambu Rural Municipality varies significantly with altitude. Lower wards (around 1,000–2,000 m) experience a subtropical highland climate, with warm summers and mild winters. Middle elevations (2,000–3,500 m), where most villages are located, have a temperate climate with cool summers and cold winters, with snowfall possible from December to February. Higher zones above 3,500 metres experience alpine conditions, with heavy snowfall in winter and a short warm season.

The monsoon season runs from June to September, bringing heavy rainfall and increasing the risk of landslides and flooding in valley areas. The pre-monsoon spring (March–May) and post-monsoon autumn (October–November) are generally considered the best seasons for trekking and outdoor activities.

== Administration and Government ==
=== Municipal Structure ===
Helambu Rural Municipality is governed by an elected Municipal Council and Executive Committee, with an elected Chairperson and Vice-Chairperson at the head. Below the municipal level, each of the 7 wards is governed by an elected Ward Committee, headed by a Ward Chairperson.

Position	Name	Party
Chairperson	Nima Gyaljen Hyolmo	—
Vice-Chairperson	—	—

The municipality's administrative headquarters is located in the Melamchi area, which serves as the main commercial and services hub for the region.

=== Formation History ===
The municipality was established on 10 March 2017 when the Government of Nepal restructured local government units pursuant to the Constitution of Nepal 2015, which established Nepal's federal system with three tiers of government: federal, provincial, and local. The merger of five former VDCs into one rural municipality was part of a nationwide consolidation that reduced Nepal's local government units from thousands of VDCs to 753 local levels.

== Demographics ==
=== Religion ===
According to the 2021 Nepal census, Buddhism is the dominant religion in Helambu Rural Municipality, followed by Hinduism. Smaller communities practise Christianity, Islam, Kirat, Prakriti, and other faiths.

Religion in Helambu Rural Municipality (2021 Census)
Religion	Population*	Percentage
Buddhism	12,263	70.1%
Hinduism	4,985	28.5%
Christianity	221	1.3%
Islam	18	0.1%
Kirat Mundhum	5	0.03%
Prakriti	5	0.03%
Other / Not stated	0	0.0%
Total	17,497	100.0%

=== Population ===
According to the 2021 Nepal census, Helambu Rural Municipality had a total population of 17,497. The 2011 census had recorded a population of 17,671, reflecting a slight decline of 174 persons (−0.98%) over the decade, likely due to migration for education and economic opportunities in Kathmandu and abroad.

Census Year	Total Population	Male	Female	Households
2011	17,671	8,564	9,107	4,203
2021	17,497	8781	8716	4690

The population density is approximately 61 persons per km². The gender ratio of the 2011 census showed 94 males for every 100 females, indicating a higher rate of male migration compared to females.

=== Ethnicity ===
According to the 2011 and 2021 Nepal censuses, Helambu Rural Municipality is predominantly inhabited by the Tamang and Hyolmo/Yolmo communities. Smaller populations include Chhetri, Brahmin, Sanyasi/Dashnami, Bishwakarma, Newar, Sherpa, Pariyar, and Magar communities.

Major caste/ethnic groups in Helambu Rural Municipality (2011–2021)
Rank	Caste / Ethnicity	2011 Population	2011%	2021 Population	2021%	Change (Percentage Points)
1	Tamang	8,298	46.96%	9,352	53.4%	+6.44
2	Hyolmo/Yolmo	3,270	18.51%	2,943	16.8%	−1.71
3	Chhetri	1,742	9.86%	1,486	8.8%	−1.06
4	Brahmin	1,400	7.92%	1,258	7.2%	−0.72
5	Sanyasi / Dashnami	936	5.30%	798	4.6%	−0.70
6	Bishwakarma	615	3.48	408	2.3%	-1.18%
7	Newar	—	—	1.5%	—	
8	Sherpa	—	—	1.2%	—	
9	Pariyar	—	—	1.0%	—	
10	Magar	—	—	1.0%	—	
—	Other groups	2,025	11.46%	2.2%	−9.26	
Total	17,671	100.00%	100.00%	—		

=== Language ===
The most widely spoken language in the municipality is Tamang, spoken by approximately 8,479 people. The Tamang language is spoken by 4,328 females and 4,151 males within the municipality. Other languages spoken in the municipality include:

- Nepali — the national language, widely understood across all communities
- Hyolmo/Yolmo — the traditional language of the indigenous Hyolmo people
- Newar
- Sherpa
- Gurung
- Maithili
- Magar

== Religion ==
=== Hinduism ===
==== History of Hinduism in Helambu ====
Hinduism has been present in the Helambu region since at least the fifth century CE, when, according to local tradition, the first human settlements were established in the area that is now Palchok village (Ward No. 3). The earliest Hindu settlers cleared the forests of the lower Helambu valleys and established shrines and temples that became the foundations of the region's Hindu religious life. Over the centuries, Brahmin and Chhetri communities expanded their presence in the lower wards, establishing household shrines, community temples, and sacred sites dedicated to various Hindu deities.

The importance of Helambu's Hindu heritage was reinforced through royal patronage: Palchoki Mai Temple is said to have been worshipped by Nepal's kings and queens since ancient times, giving it a status that transcended local boundaries and connected it to the broader Hindu monarchical tradition of the Kathmandu Valley. Pilgrims from Kathmandu Valley, Nuwakot, Kavre, and other districts have for centuries travelled to Palchok to worship at the temple.

A notable historical event that brought the temple greater public attention was the story of Juddha Shamsher's wife, who fell gravely ill and was brought to Palchoki Mai Temple. After being treated by the local jhankri (shaman-healer) at the temple, she reportedly recovered, which brought the temple into wider prominence and increased its reputation as a site of miraculous healing.

==== Palchoki Mai Temple (Jay Bageshwari) ====
The most significant Hindu religious site in Helambu Rural Municipality — and one of the most important in all of Sindhupalchok District — is Palchoki Mai Temple, officially known as Jay Bageshwari Temple (जय बागेश्वरी मन्दिर). The temple is located in Ward No. 3 at Palchok village, at an altitude of approximately 1,750 metres (5,740 ft) above sea level.

===== Origin Legend =====
According to a well-preserved local legend, the temple's origin dates to around the 5th century CE, when the very first settlers arrived and began clearing the forest at the present temple site. As they dug into the earth, blood reportedly began flowing from one side of the ground and milk from the other. Stunned by this divine sign, the settlers believed that a god or goddess was residing within the earth at that spot. Their excavation also revealed two sacred stones or rock formations at the same location.

These two sacred objects were identified as follows: Jageshwari on the right side and Bageshwari on the left side. The temple was accordingly named Jay Bageshwari — Jay being both a celebratory term (meaning victory) and a contraction honouring both deities. At the second spot, where milk had flowed from the earth, the settlers believed that Lord Shiva himself was present, and they constructed a temple to Siddheshwar Mahadev at that location, which stands adjacent to the main Bageshwari shrine to this day.

===== Connection to the Name "Sindhupalchok" =====
Palchoki Mai Temple and the village of Palchok have a direct etymological connection to the name of the entire Sindhupalchok District. The district's name is composed of two elements: Sindhu, referring to the Sindhu Khola (a tributary river flowing through the district), and Palchok, referring to the village and its sacred Bhagwati temple. Local tradition holds that the Palchok in "Sindhupalchok" is derived from this very village and its ancient temple. This is officially acknowledged by the Sindhupalchok District Administration Office, which states that the district was named after the Sindhu river and the Palchok Bhagwati in the northern part of the district.

This makes Palchok not merely a local pilgrimage site but a place of foundational significance for the identity and historical name of one of Nepal's largest districts.

===== Priests, Traditions, and Worship Practices =====
The priestly duties at Palchoki Mai Temple have traditionally been performed by members of the Giri caste, who served as the hereditary priests (pujari) of the temple. The temple is collectively worshipped and protected by three communities in the surrounding area: the Tamang, Giri, and Khadka communities, who each have customary responsibilities in its upkeep, rituals, and festivals.

A central belief held by devotees is that Palchoki Mai grants wishes: if a devotee comes to the temple with one sincere wish, that wish will be fulfilled. Once a wish is granted, the devotee is expected to return to pay their vow (mannat utarnu), creating an ongoing cycle of devotion and thanksgiving that brings pilgrims back repeatedly over their lifetimes.

===== Sacred Prohibitions =====
The temple follows strict rules regarding animal sacrifice (bali). Animal sacrifice is expressly prohibited on the following occasions and periods:

- Ekadashi (the 11th day of each lunar fortnight)
- Ram Navami
- Maha Shivaratri
- The entire month of Shrawan (the sacred month of Lord Shiva)
- Krishna Janmashtami (Shree Krishna Janma Ashtami)
- From Ghatasthapana to the Ashtami of Dashain

These prohibitions reflect the temple's incorporation of non-violent religious values on certain sacred days and stand as a notable feature distinguishing it from some other Bhagwati temples in Nepal.

===== Fairs and Festivals at Palchoki Mai =====
The temple is the site of large annual fairs (mela) that attract thousands of pilgrims from across Sindhupalchok and neighbouring districts. The largest gathering of the year occurs on Navami (the ninth day of Dashain), when the temple is filled with worshippers offering prayers and participating in rituals. Other major festival occasions at the temple include:

- Dashain (both Sharad Dashain in autumn and Chaite Dashain in spring)
- Janai Purnima (the full moon of Shrawan)
- Other major Hindu festivals throughout the year

Visitors consistently note that the ritual of worship at Palchoki Mai has a distinctive character compared to other temples in the region, which adds to its appeal as both a pilgrimage site and a tourist attraction.

===== Tourism Development =====
In recent years, Palchok and Palchoki Mai Temple have become increasingly accessible to visitors from Kathmandu, following improvements to road infrastructure and the opening of hotels and accommodation facilities in the area. The local municipality has developed a master plan for the preservation and promotion of the temple and surrounding area. The temple is now widely considered the centre of tourism for the Helambu region, serving as an anchor point for religious tourists, cultural visitors, and trekkers who pass through the area on their way to higher destinations.

==== Other Hindu Temples and Sites ====
Beyond Palchoki Mai, the municipality contains a number of other Hindu temples and shrines that serve local communities and attract pilgrims, particularly in the lower-altitude wards where Brahmin and Chhetri populations are more concentrated. These include:

- Temples dedicated to various local manifestations of Bhagwati (the goddess) in ward-level settlements
- Shrines to Ganesh, Shiva, and other deities in village centres
- Household shrines (dhungey dhara and private puja rooms) maintained by Hindu families throughout all wards

The tradition of maintaining sacred water spouts (dhunge dhara), sacred trees wrapped in cloth, and natural rock shrines is widespread across the municipality and reflects the deep integration of Hindu practice into everyday life in the region.

=== Buddhism ===
==== Buddhist Heritage of Helambu ====
Buddhism, specifically the Vajrayana tradition, is the dominant religion of Helambu Rural Municipality and has been at the heart of the region's cultural life for centuries. The Hyolmo/Yolmo and Tamang communities, who together form the majority of the municipality's population, practise a form of Tibetan Buddhism that was brought to the Helambu valley through historical connections with Tibetan Buddhist masters, trade routes, and monastic institutions.

The Helambu region is considered a sacred Ba Yul (hidden valley) in Tibetan Buddhist tradition — one of several Himalayan valleys said to have been blessed by Padmasambhava (Guru Rinpoche), the 8th-century Indian master credited with spreading Vajrayana Buddhism across the Himalayas. Sites in Melamchi Ghyang and the surrounding area are associated with Padmasambhava's meditation and blessing, attracting Buddhist pilgrims alongside trekkers.

Because of the large number of monasteries (gompas) found throughout its villages, Helambu Rural Municipality is sometimes referred to as the City of Monasteries.

==== Key Monasteries (Gompas) ====
The municipality contains several historically and spiritually significant Buddhist monasteries, which serve as centres of religious practice, community life, and cultural preservation:

- Tarkeghyang Monastery (Ward No. 1) — One of the oldest and most important gompas in the entire Helambu region. Located in Tarkeghyang village, it is central to the spiritual life of the Hyolmo community and is a key landmark on the Helambu trekking circuit.
- Melamchi Ghyang Monastery (Ward No. 1) — A central spiritual hub for the local communities of Melamchi Ghyang. The surrounding village is associated with Padmasambhava's meditation, making it a pilgrimage site for devout Vajrayana Buddhists.
- Sermathang Monastery (Ward No. 1) — Known for hosting vibrant festivals and cultural events, this monastery serves the Sermathang village community and attracts visitors during major Buddhist festivals.
- Kakani Monastery — A serene monastery offering panoramic views of the surrounding mountain landscapes, used for community gatherings and religious ceremonies.

Beyond these major gompas, smaller village monasteries, prayer wheels (mani), stupas (chortens), and walls inscribed with the mantra Om Mani Padme Hum (mani walls) are found throughout all the wards of the municipality, underscoring how deeply Buddhist practice is woven into the everyday landscape and life of Helambu.

==== Ama Yangri — Guardian Deity of the Helambu Valley ====
Ama Yangri (अमा याङ्री) is a sacred mountain peak located within Helambu Rural Municipality, rising to an elevation of 3,771 metres (12,372 ft) above sea level. It is revered as the guardian deity and clan goddess of the Hyolmo community and is one of the most spiritually significant natural landmarks in the entire Helambu region.

===== Name and Meaning =====
The name Ama Yangri translates in the Hyolmo language as "Divine Mother Yangri" — Ama meaning mother and Yangri being the personal name of the deity. It was historically known as Ama Chyomu Yangri. In another interpretation, the name has been rendered as "Mother's Necklace," representing the sacred and protective role of the peak for the valley below. The peak is also referred to locally as "Grandmother's Shoulder.

===== Mythological Significance =====
According to the central legend of Ama Yangri, the deity chose this high peak as her permanent dwelling place because from its summit the entire Hyolmo area of Helambu can be seen in one view — a perfect vantage point for a protective goddess to watch over her people. The Hyolmo believe that Ama Yangri is their clan goddess, who protects them from birth to death: locals grow up described as being "in the womb of Ama Yangri" and living their lives "in her path and blessings."

A secondary legend holds that the name derives from the story of a yak-herder woman who passed away on this peak, and whose three sons erected a stupa at the place where her body was found. This stupa is still present at the summit today.

The site is also associated with the meditation of Padmasambhava, further linking Ama Yangri to the deepest roots of Vajrayana Buddhism in the Himalayan world.

===== Religious Site at the Summit =====
At the summit of Ama Yangri stands a Buddhist monastery or temple (gompa), along with a chorten (stupa) and traditional prayer flags that flutter in the mountain wind. Pilgrims who make the journey to the summit offer incense, butter lamps, and prayers. The summit rituals are performed regularly by both local devotees and visiting Buddhist practitioners. The Jhyatta Rinpoche monastery at the top is a significant spiritual destination.

===== Significance Across Faiths =====
While Ama Yangri is primarily a Buddhist sacred site, it is also revered by Hindu communities in the region. Hindus consider Ama Yangri sacred as a manifestation of the goddess Tara in her protective aspect. This dual veneration makes Ama Yangri a rare example of interfaith sacred geography in the Himalayas, where the same peak carries profound spiritual meaning for communities of different religious traditions. Buddhists of the Hyolmo, Sherpa, and Tamang communities, as well as Hindu devotees, visit the peak as a place of spiritual power.

==== Interfaith Character of Helambu ====
A defining feature of religious life in Helambu Rural Municipality is the long-established tradition of interfaith coexistence and mutual respect between Hindu and Buddhist communities. In many villages, Hindu and Buddhist households live side by side and participate in each other's festivals. Palchoki Mai Temple draws devotees from both faiths. Major festivals such as Dashain, Tihar, and Janai Purnima are observed alongside Buddhist festivals like Sonam Losar and Hyolmo Losar, creating a shared religious calendar that reinforces community bonds across sectarian lines.

== Economy ==
=== Agriculture and Horticulture ===
The economy of Helambu Rural Municipality is primarily agrarian, with a large majority of households engaged in subsistence and small-scale commercial agriculture. The main crops grown in the municipality include maize, millet, potatoes, wheat, and a variety of vegetables suited to the temperate mountain climate.

Helambu is known for its apple production, particularly in the higher elevations of the municipality. The apples are sold in Kathmandu and other urban markets in Nepal and have contributed to the region's agricultural economy for generations.

=== Animal Husbandry ===
Cattle, buffalo, goat, sheep, and — at higher elevations — yak and yak-cow hybrids (chauri) are raised throughout the municipality. Yak herding at high-altitude pastures (kharka) is a traditional practice of the Hyolmo communities, providing milk, cheese, meat, and transport for goods in the mountain terrain. Potatoes, yak milk, and dairy products form a staple part of the diet and local food economy.

=== Rainbow Trout Farming ===
Helambu Rural Municipality has emerged as one of Nepal's leading regions for commercial rainbow trout (Oncorhynchus mykiss) farming, owing to the cold, clean, fast-flowing mountain streams and river waters that provide ideal conditions for trout cultivation. The industry developed from the early 2010s and has become a significant economic activity in the municipality.

Commercial trout farming in Helambu began around 2014 when pioneering farmers such as the Bhandari brothers of Kiul Pati village (Ward No. 2) established the first farms in the area. In their initial year, the Bhandari brothers incurred losses while learning the trade, but over five years of experimentation and refinement they became expert trout farmers, ultimately building a business earning approximately Rs 5 million annually from their farm, which covers 5 ropanis of land and produces 10 tonnes of fish per year. They also established the Rainbow Trout Research Centre in Kiul Pati, which produces over 200,000 fingerlings annually and serves as a training facility for aspiring trout farmers from across Nepal.

Rainbow trout thrive in water temperatures between 9 °C and 18 °C — conditions that occur naturally year-round in the mountain streams fed by glacial snowmelt in Helambu. According to the District Agriculture Development Office, there are approximately 10 trout farms in Sindhupalchok District, which together produce around 16 tonnes of fish annually. Demand for Helambu trout comes from Kathmandu restaurants and hotels, as well as from international visitors who prize its freshness and quality.

Trout farming is significant for the municipality beyond its direct income value: it provides a high-value alternative income source for mountain households, supports the growth of agritourism (visitors come specifically to fish, dine on fresh trout, and learn about sustainable mountain agriculture), and has attracted national policy attention as a model for mountain entrepreneurship. The Helambu Rainbow Trout and Organic Farm is among the most prominent enterprises in the municipality, having been recognised at the national level and praised by senior government officials for its organic practices and professional standards.

The 2021 Melamchi flood caused severe damage to trout farms in the municipality, but the industry has been gradually rebuilding since then.

=== Tourism ===
Tourism is a growing component of the municipality's economy. The Helambu trekking circuit, Ama Yangri trek, Palchoki Mai Temple pilgrimage, and proximity to the Langtang region attract both domestic and international visitors. Local communities have developed homestays, teahouses, and lodges that provide accommodation and food to trekkers, generating income for households along the main routes.

== Infrastructure ==
=== Education ===
According to 2017 government records, there were 38 schools operating in Helambu Rural Municipality, with an average of 93 students per school. The schools serve all seven wards of the municipality, though the remoteness of some upper wards makes access to secondary and higher education challenging for some students. Many young people from the municipality travel to Kathmandu or district headquarters for higher education.

=== Transport ===
The municipality is accessible from Kathmandu via the Araniko Highway to the Melamchi junction, and then via the Melamchi–Helambu road that winds through the hills into the valley. The road reaches Timbu, from which a further road of variable quality extends to Tarkeghyang and upper settlements. During the monsoon season, road access can be disrupted by landslides, and some wards may temporarily become inaccessible by road.

The 2021 Melamchi flood caused severe damage to road infrastructure and bridges in the municipality, with several suspension bridges and motorable bridges destroyed. Reconstruction has been ongoing but remains incomplete in some areas.

== Melamchi River ==
=== Overview ===
The Melamchi River (Nepali: मेलम्चि खोला) is the principal river flowing through Helambu Rural Municipality and is the most important waterway of the entire Sindhupalchok region. The river originates from the Jugal Himal glaciers at an elevation of approximately 5,875 metres (19,275 ft) above sea level, making Helambu Rural Municipality the geographical origin and upper catchment of this significant river system. The Melamchi River flows southward for approximately 41 kilometres before joining the Indrawati River at Melamchi Bazaar downstream. The river's total catchment area up to its confluence is 330 km², and its mean annual flow is 9.7 m³/s, reaching a maximum flow of 289 m³/s during peak monsoon floods.

=== Ecological Importance ===
The Melamchi River and its tributaries — including the Timbu Khola and Gohore Khola — are the ecological backbone of the municipality. Their cold, clear, fast-flowing waters sustain biodiversity, provide irrigation for terraced farms, supply drinking water for households, and support the fish (notably trout) that have become an important part of the local economy. The river systems also contribute to maintaining the forests, pastures, and alpine ecosystems that define Helambu's remarkable landscape diversity.

=== Melamchi Water Supply Project ===
The Melamchi Water Supply Project is Nepal's most significant urban water supply infrastructure project, designed to address Kathmandu Valley's chronic and severe water shortage by diverting water from the Melamchi River to the capital through a 27.5-kilometre headrace tunnel. The intake headworks of the project are located in the Helambu area, making the municipality the primary source of Kathmandu's supplemental drinking water supply.

The project, which took many years to complete due to engineering challenges, earthquakes (2015), and flood damage (2021), represents a direct connection between Helambu and the daily lives of hundreds of thousands of Kathmandu residents. The project intake and associated infrastructure are a point of interest for visitors to the region and have brought economic activity, employment, and infrastructure development to the municipality. The 2021 Melamchi flood caused major damage to project infrastructure, temporarily setting back water supply operations to Kathmandu.

== Tourism ==
=== Overview ===
Helambu Rural Municipality is one of Nepal's important trekking and cultural tourism destinations, offering a combination of Himalayan scenery, Hyolmo and Tamang cultural heritage, Buddhist monasteries, Hindu pilgrimage sites, and natural attractions within relatively easy reach of Kathmandu. Tourism has developed more gradually here than in the Everest or Annapurna regions, which has helped preserve the area's cultural authenticity and natural environment. Local communities have embraced tourism through the development of homestays, community lodges, and guided trekking services.

=== Helambu Trek (Yolmo Heritage Trail) ===
The Helambu Trek, also known as the Helambu Circuit or Yolmo Heritage Trail, is one of the most accessible major trekking routes in Nepal and is particularly well-suited for those with limited time or who are new to Himalayan trekking. The circuit typically takes 7 to 8 days to complete and begins and ends close to Kathmandu, making it a convenient option for visitors who cannot afford a long journey to more remote regions.

The trail passes through a diverse range of landscapes: subtropical valleys, temperate forests rich with rhododendron, pine, and juniper, open ridgelines with panoramic Himalayan views, and traditional Hyolmo and Tamang villages. Key villages along the route include Chisapani, Tharepati, Melamchi Ghyang, Tarkeghyang, and Sermathang. At Tharepati, trekkers are rewarded with sweeping views of major Himalayan peaks including the Langtang, Jugal Himal, Dorje Lakpa, Ganesh Himal, Gaurishankar, and on clear days, even the distant summit of Mount Everest.

The trek is accessible year-round, though the best seasons are spring (March–May) and autumn (October–November). The trek falls within the Langtang National Park area for its upper sections, and trekkers require a national park permit. The Helambu circuit is sometimes also called the "Yolmo Heritage Trail" in recognition of the living cultural heritage of the Hyolmo people that permeates the entire route — their monasteries, prayer flags, chortens, thangka paintings, masks, and traditional architecture are encountered throughout the journey.

=== Ama Yangri Trek ===
The Ama Yangri trek is one of the most rewarding short treks available near Kathmandu and is the primary trekking route to the sacred peak of Ama Yangri (3,771 m). The standard itinerary is a 5-day round trip from Kathmandu, making it suitable for beginner trekkers, families, and those wishing to combine a physical adventure with a profound cultural and spiritual experience.

The standard route runs: Kathmandu → Sankhu → Melamchi → Timbu → Tarkeghyang → Ama Yangri. From Kathmandu, it takes approximately 3 hours by road to reach the starting point of the trek in Melamchi. The trail from Tarkeghyang to the Ama Yangri summit takes approximately 3–4 hours of walking through beautiful forests of rhododendron (laliguras), pine, and juniper, with abundant bird and wildlife. Trekkers who start their ascent before dawn are can sometimes see a sunrise over the Himalayas from the summit at 3,771 metres.

From the summit, on clear mornings, it is possible to see Langtang Lirung, Ganesh Himal, Gaurishankar, Dorje Lakpa, Jugal Himal, and even Shishapangma and distant Mount Everest. The summit monastery and prayer flags add a spiritual dimension to the physical achievement of reaching the top. The Ama Yangri trek requires both the Langtang National Park permit and the Shivapuri National Park permit.

During winter, Ama Yangri receives snowfall, making it an accessible destination for those wishing to experience snow sports and snow trekking within a few hours of Kathmandu.

=== Langtang Region Connection ===
Helambu Rural Municipality serves as a southern gateway to the broader Langtang trekking region. From the upper wards of the municipality, several classic trekking routes connect Helambu with:

- Gosaikunda — a sacred cluster of alpine lakes revered in both Hindu and Buddhist traditions, connected via the Lauribina La pass (4,610 m)
- Langtang Valley — Nepal's third most popular trekking region, accessible by crossing high passes from the Helambu circuit
- Panch Pokhari — five sacred lakes at high altitude, sacred to both Hindus and Buddhists, reachable from Melamchi

These connections give trekkers passing through Helambu the option of extending their journey into some of Nepal's finest high-altitude terrain.

=== Palchoki Mai Temple as a Tourist Site ===
In addition to its religious significance, Palchoki Mai Temple in Ward No. 3 has become a prominent tourist attraction drawing visitors from Kathmandu Valley and beyond. Following improvements to road access, the opening of hotels and guesthouses in the Palchok area, and the municipality's active work on a temple development master plan, Palchok has been transformed from a remote pilgrimage site into an accessible day-trip or overnight destination. The natural environment, the altitude, the Himalayan views accessible from the temple area, and the cultural originality of Palchok village all add to the appeal for non-religious visitors as well as pilgrims.

=== Melamchi Water Supply Project Visitor Interest ===
The intake and infrastructure of the Melamchi Water Supply Project, located in the Helambu area, draws curious visitors interested in Nepal's largest water infrastructure project. The tunnel and headworks represent a significant engineering achievement and a critical connection between the Himalayan watershed of Helambu and the urban population of Kathmandu.

== Festivals and Culture ==
=== Overview ===
Helambu Rural Municipality celebrates a varied annual calendar of festivals, reflecting the multicultural Hindu and Buddhist character of its population. Festivals are not merely occasions for religious observance; they are also central to the renewal of community bonds, the expression of ethnic identity, and the continuation of living cultural traditions that define the Hyolmo, Tamang, Sherpa, Brahmin, and Chhetri communities of the municipality.

=== Dashain ===
Dashain (Nepali: दशैं) is the longest and most widely celebrated Hindu festival in Nepal. It is observed across all communities of Helambu Rural Municipality. The festival falls during the Nepali month of Ashwin (September–October) and lasts for fifteen days, with the most important days being Ghatasthapana (the first day), Saptami, Maha Ashtami, Maha Navami, and Vijaya Dashami (the tenth day).

At Palchoki Mai Temple, Dashain is the most important festival of the year, drawing the largest annual pilgrimage gatherings. The Navami day (ninth day of Dashain) sees a particularly grand fair (mela) at the temple, when thousands of devotees arrive from across Sindhupalchok and neighbouring districts to offer prayers, perform rituals, and participate in worship. Chaite Dashain (the spring Dashain observed in the Nepali month of Chaitra, March–April) is also a major occasion at Palchoki Mai, with many devotees preferring the spring festival due to the pleasant weather and flowering landscapes of the season.

Throughout the municipality, Dashain is marked by the receiving of tika (a red mark applied on the forehead with yogurt, rice, and vermillion) and jamara (yellow grass seedlings grown during the festival) from elders, the slaughter of animals (goats, buffalo, ducks) as offerings, and the gathering of extended families.

=== Tihar ===
Tihar (Nepali: तिहार), also known as Deepawali or the Festival of Lights, falls in the Nepali month of Kartik (October–November), approximately fifteen days after Dashain. Over five days, different beings are worshipped: crows (Kag Tihar), dogs (Kukur Tihar), cows (Gai Tihar), oxen and Lakshmi the goddess of wealth (Laxmi Puja), and brothers (Bhai Tika). Homes and villages are decorated with oil lamps, candles, and colourful lights, and the air is filled with the singing of deusi-bhailo (traditional songs of Tihar) by groups of young people going from house to house.

=== Teej ===
Teej (Nepali: तीज) is a festival primarily celebrated by Hindu women, falling in the Nepali month of Bhadra (August–September). It is one of the most important festivals for women in the Hindu calendar: women dress in red, fast for a full day and night, sing and dance in groups, and worship Shiva and Parvati, praying for the health and long life of their husbands and, for unmarried women, for a good husband. In Helambu, Teej is observed at local Shiva temples and community gathering spaces, with the singing of traditional Teej songs (teej geet) a particularly vibrant and beloved part of the celebration.

=== Janai Purnima ===
Janai Purnima (Nepali: जनाइ पूर्णिमा), also called Raksha Bandhan or Gunhi Punhi, falls on the full moon (purnima) of the Nepali month of Shrawan (July–August). For Hindu men of the Brahmin and Chhetri communities, this day is the occasion for changing the sacred thread (janai) worn across the chest, a ritual that reaffirms their religious identity and commitment to dharma. For all Hindus and many Buddhists, Janai Purnima is an auspicious day when a yellow protective thread is tied on the wrist by priests as a blessing.

At Palchoki Mai Temple, Janai Purnima is one of the major fair days of the year, drawing large crowds of pilgrims. The festival's significance as a day shared by both Hindu and Buddhist communities in Helambu makes it a particularly vivid expression of the interfaith character of the municipality.

=== Sonam Losar ===
Sonam Losar (Tamang: सोनाम ल्होसार) is the Tamang New Year festival, one of the most important cultural events for the Tamang community that forms the plurality of Helambu's population. It falls on the second new moon after the winter solstice, corresponding approximately to the Nepali month of Magh (January–February).

Sonam Losar is celebrated with great communal joy: families visit monasteries and stupas bearing offerings and flowers, prayers are offered for deceased loved ones, special rituals with mask dances are performed to drive away evil spirits, and houses are thoroughly cleaned to welcome in gods and goddesses for the new year. The festival lasts for several days and is an occasion for gathering of extended families, community feasts, and the wearing of traditional Tamang dress.

=== Hyolmo Losar ===
Hyolmo Losar is the New Year festival of the Hyolmo/Yolmo community, also falling in the Nepali month of Magh (January–February), around the same time as Sonam Losar. For the Hyolmo people, Losar is the most important festival of the year, an occasion for affirming ethnic identity, religious devotion, and community solidarity. The celebrations include visiting and making offerings at gompas (monasteries), performing traditional Hyolmo music and dance, feasting on traditional foods, and spending time with family and community members.

The co-occurrence of Sonam Losar and Hyolmo Losar in the same period means that the month of Magh is a particularly festive time in Helambu, when both Tamang and Hyolmo communities celebrate their New Years in a spirit of shared joy and cultural pride.

=== Tshechu (Chhechu) ===
Tshechu (also spelled Chhechu) is an eleven-day Buddhist festival widely celebrated by the Hyolmo community throughout the Helambu region. It is observed every year beginning from the Panchami (5th day of the lunar calendar) following Sonam Losar, continuing until Purnima (the full moon). The festival is celebrated by the neighbouring villages of Sermathang, Tarkeghyang, Melamchi Ghyang, Nakote, Kutumsang, Ghangyul, Tshengyunche, Tapkharka, and Kaje — the key communities of Helambu Rural Municipality. During Tshechu, lamas perform religious rituals, sacred dances (cham) are performed in monastery courtyards, and the community gathers for shared worship, feasting, and cultural celebration.

=== Buddha Jayanti ===
Buddha Jayanti (also called Buddha Purnima) marks the birth, enlightenment, and death of the Lord Gautam Buddha, celebrated on the full moon of the Nepali month of Baisakh (April–May). In the Buddhist communities of Helambu, Buddha Jayanti is observed with gatherings at village monasteries and sacred monuments, the offering of prayers and flowers, the chanting of Buddhist hymns by lamas (monks) and religious leaders, the distribution of chho (prasad/blessed food), charity activities, and communal feasts. The festival is especially vibrant in the villages of Ward No. 1, where the largest monasteries are located.

=== Festival Summary Table ===
Festival	Community	Nepali Month	Significance
Dashain	Hindu (all communities)	Ashwin (Sep–Oct)	Largest Hindu festival; Palchoki Mai's biggest annual fair
Tihar	Hindu (all communities)	Kartik (Oct–Nov)	Festival of lights; worship of crows, dogs, cows, Lakshmi
Teej	Hindu women	Bhadra (Aug–Sep)	Women's festival; fasting and worship of Shiva
Janai Purnima	Hindu and Buddhist	Shrawan full moon (Jul–Aug)	Sacred thread changing; major fair at Palchoki Mai
Sonam Losar	Tamang Buddhist	Magh (Jan–Feb)	Tamang New Year; mask dances, monastery visits
Hyolmo Losar	Hyolmo Buddhist	Magh (Jan–Feb)	Yolmo New Year; community feasts, cultural dances
Tshechu (Chhechu)	Hyolmo Buddhist	Magh–Falgun	Eleven-day Buddhist festival; sacred dances by lamas
Buddha Jayanti	Buddhist	Baisakh full moon (Apr–May)	Birthday of Lord Buddha; prayers, charity, feasts

== Natural Disasters ==
=== 2015 Gorkha Earthquake (Bhukampa 2072 BS) ===
The 2015 Gorkha Earthquake, recorded in Nepal as the Mahabhukampa of Baisakh 12, 2072 BS, struck on 25 April 2015 at 11:56 AM Nepal Standard Time. The earthquake had a magnitude of 7.8 Mw on the Richter scale, with its epicentre at Barpak in Gorkha District, approximately 80 kilometres northwest of Kathmandu. The earthquake was followed by numerous aftershocks, including a powerful aftershock of 7.3 Mw on 12 May 2015 (Baisakh 29, 2072 BS), whose epicentre was located at the border between Sindhupalchok District and Dolakha District.

The earthquake killed nearly 9,000 people across Nepal and injured over 22,000, leaving more than 3.5 million people homeless. Sindhupalchok District was among the fourteen most severely affected districts in the country, and was in many ways the district that suffered the greatest proportional destruction: the powerful May 12 aftershock, whose epicentre was directly in Sindhupalchok, caused additional devastation to structures already weakened by the April 25 main shock.

In Sindhupalchok District as a whole:

- Over 63,885 houses were severely damaged
- A further 2,751 houses were moderately damaged
- Approximately 109,000 people (about 40% of the district population) were directly affected
- Around 90,000 people were identified as in urgent need of humanitarian assistance
- The initial death toll in the district alone reached 3,057 as of 7 May 2015, with an estimated 3,000 more people unaccounted for at that time

Within Helambu Rural Municipality specifically, the earthquake destroyed homes, temples, school buildings, community infrastructure, and water systems across all wards. Many families in the municipality spent months or years living under temporary tin-roof shelters before permanent reconstruction was completed. Remote wards, unreachable by road, faced particular delays in receiving relief materials and reconstruction support. The earthquake also caused significant geological damage to the hillsides — loosening vast amounts of rock and soil material on mountain slopes — which is widely identified by researchers as a major contributing factor to the severity of the 2021 Melamchi flood disaster, as this destabilized material was available to be mobilised by subsequent rainfall and water events.

=== 2021 Melamchi Flood (Baadhipahiro 2078 BS) ===
In June 2021 (2078 BS), the Melamchi River experienced one of the most catastrophic flood and debris-flow events in Nepal's modern history, causing widespread destruction in Helambu Rural Municipality and downstream communities. The event, known as the 2021 Melamchi Flood or Melamchi Baadhpahiro, was a multi-hazard cascading disaster triggered by a combination of prolonged monsoon rainfall, multiple landslides, a temporary landslide dam on the Melamchi River, and the outburst of the Pemdan glacial lake located upstream in the Melamchi catchment area.

==== Sequence of Events ====
The disaster unfolded over several days in mid-June 2021. Heavy monsoon rains triggered numerous landslides in the steep hillsides of the upper Melamchi catchment, including areas of Helambu. One major landslide blocked the Melamchi River, creating a temporary landslide dam. When this dam burst, it released a powerful flash flood mixed with a debris flow carrying enormous quantities of sand, boulders, logs, and other material. The flood hit Melamchi Bazaar (downstream from Helambu) after 8–9 PM, following an evacuation warning issued by local authorities who had detected the river damming. A second major flood and debris flow event struck on 31 July 2021, compounding the destruction of the June event.

==== Impact on Helambu Rural Municipality ====
The impact of the 2021 Melamchi Flood on Helambu Rural Municipality was severe and wide-ranging, affecting human life, housing, livelihoods, infrastructure, and natural systems:

Human casualties: According to the initial report of the National Disaster Risk Reduction and Management Authority (NDRRMA), 5 people were confirmed dead, 20 people were reported missing, and 6 were injured. All of the missing persons were from the Helambu area, according to the Helambu Rural Municipality office.

Housing: An estimated 252 households in Helambu were damaged or destroyed by the flood. Combined with the 287 households damaged in adjacent Melamchi Municipality, a total of approximately 337 households were fully destroyed in the combined disaster area, displacing 525 families.

Infrastructure: The flood destroyed a large number of critical infrastructure items:

- 13 suspension bridges and 7 motorable bridges were destroyed
- Numerous road stretches were washed out in multiple locations above Melamchi Bazaar
- Telecommunications infrastructure — internet, telephone, and mobile networks — were disrupted across large areas
- The electricity supply was cut off in several wards
- Multiple wards of Helambu were physically disconnected from the outside world following the destruction of bridges and roads

Livelihoods: Agricultural land along river banks and terraced hillsides was buried under debris or washed away. Trout farms and other enterprises in the municipality were destroyed. The fishing community's traditional livelihood was severely disrupted by the changed river morphology resulting from the massive debris deposition.

Mental health: A study conducted by the Prakriti Resources Center, surveying 539 households in the Melamchi flood-affected area, found that 85% of flood-affected participants showed signs of mental health problems, including anxiety, sleeplessness due to fear, and chronic stress. The study noted that not only those who lost family members, but also those who lost their homes, businesses, and crops experienced significant mental health impacts. As of 2025, mental health support systems in the affected area remained inadequate, with no clear national policy for need-based psychosocial counselling after flood disasters.

==== Recovery and Reconstruction ====
Recovery and reconstruction following the 2021 flood has been a slow and difficult process for Helambu Rural Municipality. Bridge rebuilding, road restoration, and housing reconstruction have proceeded in stages, with support from national government agencies, international organisations, and NGOs. However, as of the mid-2020s, reconstruction of all destroyed bridges and roads has not been fully completed, and some wards continue to be more vulnerable to being cut off during monsoon season than they were before 2021.

The Melamchi Water Supply Project, whose infrastructure was damaged by the flood, also required significant repair work before water supply operations to Kathmandu could resume at full capacity. The combined impact of the 2015 earthquake and the 2021 flood has made disaster risk reduction and climate resilience planning a central concern for Helambu Rural Municipality's governance.

== Helambu Region ==
Helambu Rural Municipality is the administrative unit within the broader Helambu region, a highland area of Nepal beginning at the Lauribina La pass and descending through the Helambu valley to the Melamchi River valley. The word "Yolmo" — the self-designation of the indigenous Hyolmo people — is itself said to derive from the word "Helambu." The region is internationally known for trekking, Buddhist heritage, and natural beauty, and the municipality represents its core administrative and cultural heart.

== See also ==
- Sindhupalchok District
- Bagmati Province
- Helambu
- Yolmo people
- Rural municipality (Nepal)
- 2021 Nepal census
- 2021 Melamchi flood
- April 2015 Nepal earthquake
- Melamchi River
- Melamchi Water Supply Project
- Langtang National Park
- Gosaikunda
