= Mankha =

Mankha माङ्खा
- Village development committee
- Location in Nepal
- Coordinates: 27.77°N 85.84°E
- Country: Nepal
- Zone: Bagmati Zone
- District: Sindhupalchok District

Population (1991)
  - Total: 3,984
  - Religions: Hinduism Buddhism
- Time zone: UTC+5:45 (Nepal Time)

Mankha is a village in Sindhupalchok District in the Bagmati Zone of central Nepal. At the time of the 1991 Nepal census it had a population of 3984 and had 1418 houses in the village.
