= Conscious Impact =

Non-profit based in Nepal

- Formation: 2015
- Founder: Orion Haas and Allen Gula
- Purpose: Sustainable rural development
- Location: Takure, Nepal
- Coordinates: 27.954°N 85.685°E
- Website: Website

Conscious Impact is a sustainable rural development non-profit based in the village of Takure, Nepal.

== History ==
Conscious Impact was founded by Orion Haas and Allen Gula following the April 2015 Nepal Earthquake. When the earthquake occurred, Hass and Gula had been trekking in the Himalayan region of the country. They physically felt the earthquake and saw the destruction of the earthquake.

After a short-term crowdfunding campaign to support initial rebuilding efforts, Haas and Gula established Conscious Impact to provide continued support to the community of Takure, a low-income, farming village in the Sindhupalchowk District, about 30 miles northeast of Kathmandu. Conscious Impact chose to base itself in Takure because of the extreme devastation from the earthquake in the village, with 244 of 245 structures being destroyed.

Conscious Impact focuses sustainable and resilient community development. To rebuild homes, it uses sustainable "earth bricks" made of locally sourced materials.

Conscious Impact hosts international volunteers and partners with local Nepali community members.
