= Mahankal =

Mahankal may refer to:

- Mahankal, Kathmandu, Nepal
- Mahankal, Sindhupalchok, Nepal
