= Atarpur =

Atarpur अत्तरपुर
- Village development committee
- Location in Nepal
- Coordinates: 27.68°N 85.90°E
- Country: Nepal
- Zone: Bagmati Zone
- District: Sindhupalchok District

Population (1991)
  - Total: 2,008
  - Religions: Hindu
- Time zone: UTC+5:45 (Nepal Time)

Atarpur (Nepali: अत्तरपुर) is a village in Sindhupalchok District in the Bagmati Zone of central Nepal. At the time of the 1991 Nepal census it had a population of 2008 and had 394 houses in the village.
