= Bhotechaur =

Bhotechaur भोटेचौर
- Village development committee
- Location in Nepal
- Coordinates: 27.80°N 85.51°E
- Country: Nepal
- Zone: Bagmati Zone
- District: Sindhupalchok District

Population (1991)
  - Total: 4,995
  - Religions: Hindu
- Time zone: UTC+5:45 (Nepal Time)

Bhotechaur is a village in Sindhupalchok District in the Bagmati Zone of central Nepal. At the time of the 1991 Nepal census it had a population of 4995 and had 870 houses in the village.

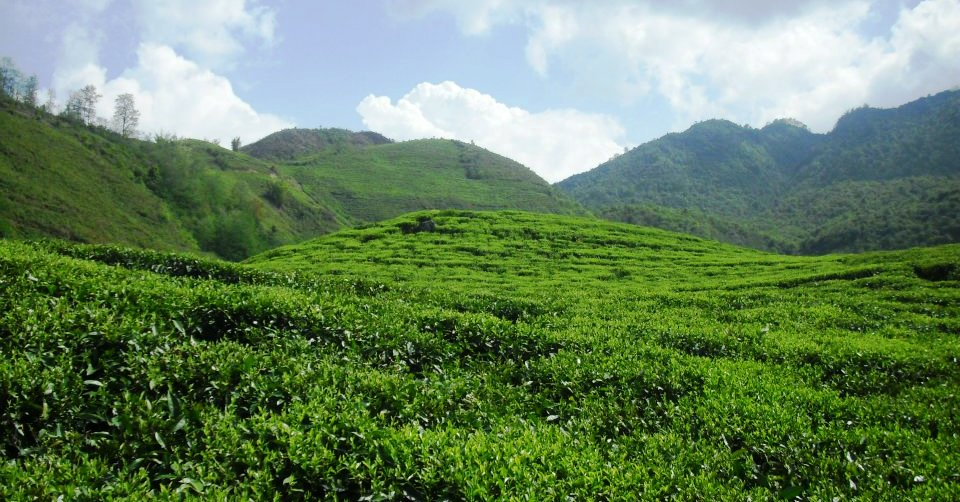
Everest tea garden in Bhotechaur

== Kundeshowri Temple ==
Bhotechaur is famous for the Shiva Mandir called Kundeshowri(Kunda - pound) Temple, which is located in Bhanjang village on the bank of the Jarke River. This temple also touches the border of Kathmandu district and is 200 meters away from Bansbari VDC, Sindupalchok.
