= Thakani =

Thakani थकानी okhreni
- Village development committee
- Location in Nepal
- Coordinates: 27.85°N 85.48°E
- Country: Nepal
- Zone: Bagmati Zone
- District: Sindhupalchok District

Population (1991)
  - Total: 3,266
  - Religions: Buddhist
- Time zone: UTC+5:45 (Nepal Time)

Thakani is a village in Sindhupalchok District in the Bagmati Zone of central Nepal. At the time of the 1991 Nepal census it had a population of 3266 and had 608 houses in the village.
