= Simpani-Kubinde, Sindhupalchowk =

Simpani is a village that comes under Kubinde ward, Chautara sagachokgadi municipality Village, ward number:4, located at around 1400 meters height above sea level, in Sindhulpalchok District in the northern part of Nepal. Geographically, it is situated in the Himalayan range of Sindhupalchowk-Nepal. It is 80 km north east from the Kathmandu Nepal. Himalayan horizon views from village attract visitors.

There were 215 houses in the village and there are about 275 families of different castes living in the village. The common language used in the village is Nepali. There is one temple which is signified as having cultural heritage and is a tourist attraction point of the village. The village has significant view of mountain Jugal which has mesmerising view to attract more tourist and internal tourism.The village has a primary school established in 1990 from villagers’ contribution. The river, ponds and spring are main sources of irrigation.

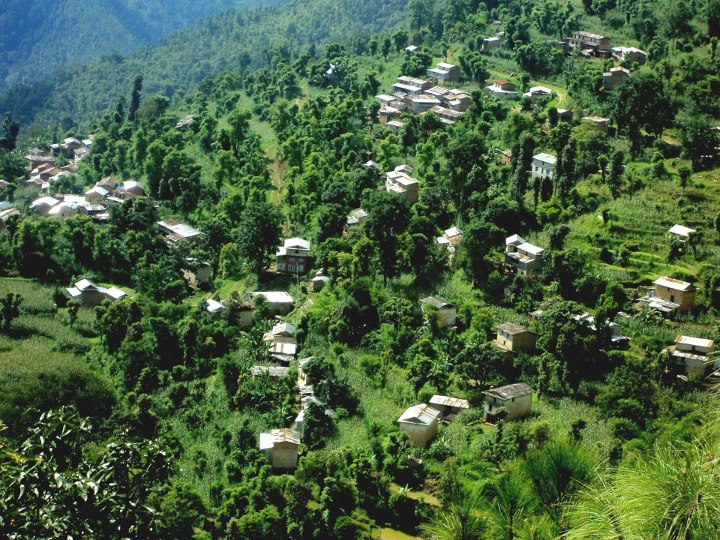
Village Picture

The main source of income for villagers is agriculture. They cultivate different crops and sell them on the market from where they can earn money. There are a few shops and mills that can be used by the public. There is a milk collection center where the villagers can sell milk. Villagers mainly focus on growing seasonal agricultural crops like paddys, rice, wheat and potatoes.
