= Dubarchaur =

Coordinates: 27°52′N 85°35′E

Dubarchaur दुर्वाचौर
- Village development committee
- Interactive map of Dubarchaur
- Country: Nepal
- Zone: Bagmati Zone
- District: Sindhupalchok District

Population (1991)
  - Total: 5,034
  - Religions: Hindu
- Time zone: UTC+5:45 (Nepal Time)

Dubarchaur is a village in Sindhupalchok District in the Bagmati Zone of central Nepal. At the time of the 1991 Nepal census it had a population of 5034 and had 1063 houses in the village.

== Climate ==
Climate data for Dubarchaur, elevation 1,550 m (5,090 ft)
Month	Jan	Feb	Mar	Apr	May	Jun	Jul	Aug	Sep	Oct	Nov	Dec	Year
Mean daily maximum °C (°F)	15.7 (60.3)	17.9 (64.2)	22.4 (72.3)	26.2 (79.2)	26.9 (80.4)	26.4 (79.5)	25.3 (77.5)	25.2 (77.4)	24.6 (76.3)	23.9 (75.0)	20.0 (68.0)	16.7 (62.1)	22.6 (72.7)
Mean daily minimum °C (°F)	4.2 (39.6)	5.3 (41.5)	9.3 (48.7)	12.4 (54.3)	14.8 (58.6)	17.3 (63.1)	17.8 (64.0)	17.4 (63.3)	16.4 (61.5)	13.1 (55.6)	8.0 (46.4)	4.7 (40.5)	11.7 (53.1)
Average precipitation mm (inches)	17.1 (0.67)	25.5 (1.00)	42.5 (1.67)	71.2 (2.80)	163.4 (6.43)	395.8 (15.58)	644.9 (25.39)	626.2 (24.65)	321.1 (12.64)	72.7 (2.86)	12.1 (0.48)	14.4 (0.57)	2,406.9 (94.74)
Source 1: Australian National University
Source 2: Japan International Cooperation Agency (precipitation)
