= Thumpakhar =

Thumpakhar थुमपाखर
- Village development committee
- Location in Nepal
- Coordinates: 27.73°N 85.84°E
- Country: Nepal
- Zone: Bagmati Zone
- District: Sindhupalchok District

Population (1991)
  - Total: 3,934
  - Religions: Hindu
- Time zone: UTC+5:45 (Nepal Time)

Thumpakhar (Nepali: थुम्पाखर) is a village in Sindhupalchok District in the Bagmati Zone of central Nepal. In the 1991 Nepal census, it had a population of 5210, with 1023 houses.

== Popular Villages in Thumpakhar ==
Thumpakhar is a village development committee with many sattlements. Pakhardovan, Dhusine, Kuile, Sundanda, 9 kilo, Patidanda, Rotomate, 8 kilo are the popular villages.(12 kilo) Sanopakhar famous place in 3 dhara.View tour. Thumki dada Tuki Association (9 kilo), Mahendrodaya School (11 kilo) are also Located in Thumpakhar VDC.

The Bhotekoshi River and the Araniko Highway are the extra attractions of this village.
