= Kunchok =

Village in Sindhupalchok District in the Bagmati Zone of central Nepal

Kunchok कुनचोक
- Village development committee
- Location in Nepal
- Coordinates: 27.79°N 85.66°E
- Country: Nepal
- Zone: Bagmati Zone
- District: Sindhupalchok District

Population (1991)
  - Total: 738
  - Religions: Hindu
- Time zone: UTC+5:45 (Nepal Time)

Kunchok is a village in Sindhupalchok District in the Bagmati Zone of central Nepal. At the time of the 1991 Nepal census it had a population of 738 and had 446 houses in the village.
