= Maneshwara =

Maneshwara मानेश्वरा
- Village development committee
- Location in Nepal
- Coordinates: 27.81°N 85.86°E
- Country: Nepal
- Zone: Bagmati Zone
- District: Sindhupalchok District

Population (2011)
  - Total: 3,393
  - Religions: Hindu
- Time zone: UTC+5:45 (Nepal Time)

Maneshwara is a village in Sindhupalchok District in the Bagmati Zone of central Nepal. At the time of the 1991 Nepal census, it had a population of 3,065, and had 642 houses in the village. By 2011 the population had become 3,393 (1,816 females and 1,577 males) in 789 households.
