= Dhumthang =

Coordinates: 27°53′N 85°52′E

Ghumthang घुम्थाङ्ग
- [
- Interactive map of Ghumthang
- Country: Nepal
- Zone: Bagmati Zone
- District: Sindhupalchok District

Population (1991)
  - Total: 3,975
  - Religions: Hindu
- Time zone: UTC+5:45 (Nepal Time)

Ghumthang is a village in Sindhupalchok District in the Bagmati Zone of central Nepal. At the time of the 1991 Nepal census it had a population of 3975 and had 760 houses in the village. The rugged village hit by landslide sep 13 2020, 5 dead, 31 missing following heavy rain.
