= Thulo Dhading =

Thulo Dhading ठूलो धादिङ
- Village development committee
- Location in Nepal
- Coordinates: 27.65°N 85.90°E
- Country: Nepal
- Zone: Bagmati Zone
- District: Sindhupalchok District

Population (1991)
  - Total: 2,729
  - Religions: Buddhism
- Time zone: UTC+5:45 (Nepal Time)

Thulo Dhading is a village in Sindhupalchok District in the Bagmati Zone of central Nepal. At the time of the 1991 Nepal census it had a population of 2729 and had 468 houses in it.
