= Ghorthali =

Ghorthali घोर्थली
- Village development committee
- Location in Nepal
- Coordinates: 27.79°N 86.00°E
- Country: Nepal
- Zone: Bagmati Zone
- District: Sindhupalchok District

Population (1991)
  - Total: 1,886
  - Religions: Hindu
- Time zone: UTC+5:45 (Nepal Time)

Ghorthali is a village in Sindhupalchok District in the Bagmati Zone of central Nepal. At the time of the 1991 Nepal census it had a population of 1886 and had 375 houses in the village.
