= Talamarang =

Talamarang तालामाराङ
- Village development committee
- Location in Nepal
- Coordinates: 27.85°N 85.52°E
- Country: Nepal
- Zone: Bagmati Zone
- District: Sindhupalchok District

Population (2010)
  - Total: 3,141
  - Religions: Hindu
- Time zone: UTC+5:45 (Nepal Time)

Talamarang is a village in Sindhupalchok District in the Bagmati Zone of central Nepal. At the time of the 1991 Nepal census it had a population of 2880 and had 583 houses in the village.
