= Balephi Rural Municipality =

Rural municipality in Sindhupalchok District, Nepal

Coordinates: 27°44′N 85°47′E

Balephi Rural Municipality बलेफी गाउँपालिका
- Rural municipality
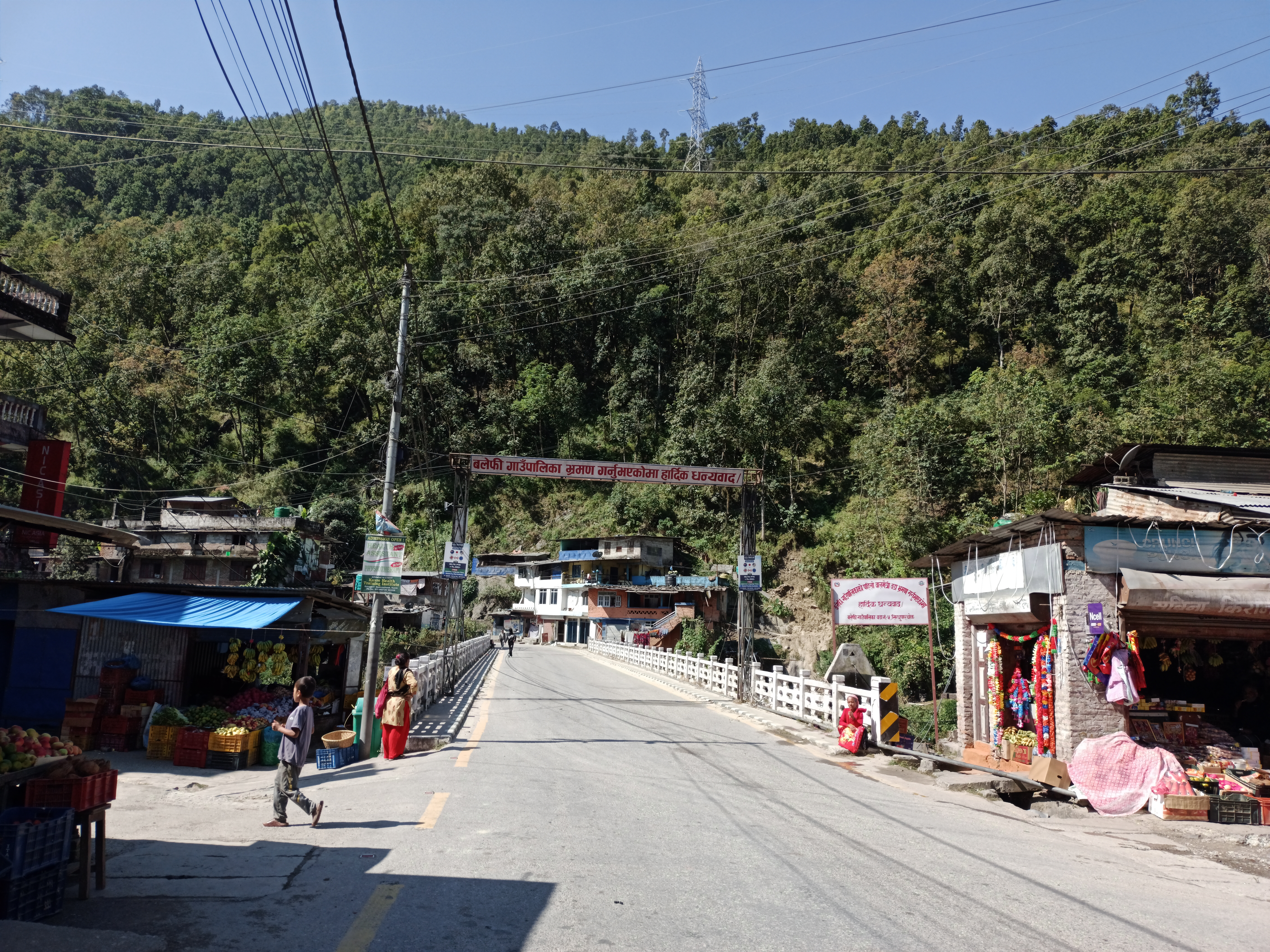

- Location in Nepal
- Country: Nepal
- Province: Bagmati Province
- District: Sindhupalchok District
- Established: 2017

Government
  - Type: Rural municipality
- Time zone: UTC+5:45 (NST)

Balephi (Nepali: बलेफी गाउँपालिका) is a rural municipality located in Sindhupalchok District of Bagmati Province of Nepal. It is bordered by Barabishe Municipality, Sunkoshi Rural Municipality, Tripura Sundari Rural Municipality, Jugal Rural Municipality, and Chautara Sangachokgadhi Municipality.
