= Gumba, Nepal =

Gumba, Nepal गुम्बा
- Village development committee
- Location in Nepal
- Coordinates: 28.06°N 85.83°E
- Country: Nepal
- Zone: Bagmati Zone
- District: Sindhupalchok District

Population (1991)
  - Total: 3,107
  - Religions: Hindu
- Time zone: UTC+5:45 (Nepal Time)

Gumba, Nepal is a village in Sindhupalchok District in the Bagmati Zone of central Nepal. At the time of the 1991 Nepal census it had a population of 3107 and had 588 houses in the village.
