= Phulpingkot =

Phulpingkot फुल्पिङकोट
- Village development committee
- Location in Nepal
- Coordinates: 27.79°N 85.80°E
- Country: Nepal
- Zone: Bagmati Zone
- District: Sindhupalchok District

Population (1991)
  - Total: 3,714
  - Religions: Hindu
- Time zone: UTC+5:45 (Nepal Time)

Phulpingkot is a village in Sindhupalchok District in the Bagmati Zone of central Nepal. At the time of the 1991 Nepal census it had a population of 3714 and had 773 houses. It is divided into nine wards.

This VDC is attached to a famous marketplace in Sindhupalchok called Jalbire. People in this district have different ethnicity and religions. The neighboring VDCs are Jalbire, Hagam, Phulpingdada, Maneshwara and Bataase. People are involved in agriculture for living. Almost all of the people are below the poverty line. Many have been working in foreign soil for the survival of their family.

Famous poet of Sindhupalchok District, Chandra Prasad Neupane is from this VDC.
