= Sikharpur =

Sikharpur शिखरपुर
- Village development committee
- Location in Nepal
- Coordinates: 27.81°N 85.59°E
- Country: Nepal
- Zone: Bagmati Zone
- District: Sindhupalchok District

Population (1991)
  - Total: 2,140
  - Religions: Hindu
- Time zone: UTC+5:45 (Nepal Time)

Sikharpur is a village in Sindhupalchok District in the Bagmati Zone of central Nepal. At the time of the 1991 Nepal census it had a population of 2140 and had 406 houses in the village.
