= Gloche =

Golche गाेल्चे
- Village development committee
- Location in Nepal
- Coordinates: 28.02°N 85.76°E
- Country: Nepal
- Zone: Bagmati Zone
- District: Sindhupalchok District

Population (1991)
  - Total: 3,814
  - Religions: [Buddhism Bon Hindu and Christian]
- Time zone: UTC+5:45 (Nepal Time)

Golche is a Tamang village in Sindhupalchok District in the Bagmati Zone of central Nepal. At the time of the 1991 Nepal census it had a population of 3814.
