= Phulpingdanda =

Phulpingdanda फुल्पिङ डाँडा
- Village development committee
- Location in Nepal
- Coordinates: 27.76°N 85.80°E
- Country: Nepal
- Zone: Bagmati Zone
- District: Sindhupalchok District

Population (1991)
  - Total: 4,085
  - Religions: Hindu
- Time zone: UTC+5:45 (Nepal Time)

Phulpingdanda is a Village development committee in Sindhupalchok District in the Bagmati Zone of central Nepal. At the time of the 1991 Nepal census it had a population of 4085 and had 804 houses in the village.
