= Thulo Pakhar =

Thulo Pakhar ठूलोपाखर
- Village development committee
- Location in Nepal
- Coordinates: 27.71°N 85.87°E
- Country: Nepal
- Zone: Bagmati Zone
- District: Sindhupalchok District

Government

Population (1991)
  - Total: 3,019
  - Religions: Hindu 13% Buddhist 84% others 3%; Castes Tamang Newar Brahmin Kshatriya Bishowkarma Sundas Thakuri Pahari
- Time zone: UTC+5:45 (Nepal Time)

Thulo Pakhar is a village in Sindhupalchok District in the Bagmati Zone of central Nepal. At the time of the 1991 Nepal census it had a population of 3019 and had 624 houses in it.
