= Thum Pakhar =

Thumpakhar थुमपाखर
- Village development committee
- Location in Nepal
- Coordinates: 27.73°N 85.84°E
- Country: Nepal
- Zone: Bagmati Zone
- District: Sindhupalchok District

Population (1991)
  - Total: 3,934
  - Religions: Hindu
- Time zone: UTC+5:45 (Nepal Time)

Thumpakhar (Nepali: थुम्पाखर) is a village in Sindhupalchok District in the Bagmati Zone of central Nepal. In the 1991 Nepal census, it had a population of 5210, with 1023 houses.

== Popular Villages in Thumpakhar ==
Thumpakhar is a village development committee with many sattlements. Pakhardovan, Dhusine, Kuile, Sundanda, 9kilo, Patidanda, Rotomate, 8kilo are the popular villages.

Bhotekoshi River and Aaraniko Highway are the main highlights of this village.
