= Haibung =

Haibung हैबुङ
- Village development committee
- Location in Nepal
- Coordinates: 27°49′12″N 85°28′12″E
- Country: Nepal
- Zone: Bagmati Zone
- District: Sindhupalchok District

Population (1991)
  - Total: 2,418
  - Religions: Buddhist Hindu and Christian
- Time zone: UTC+5:45 (Nepal Time)

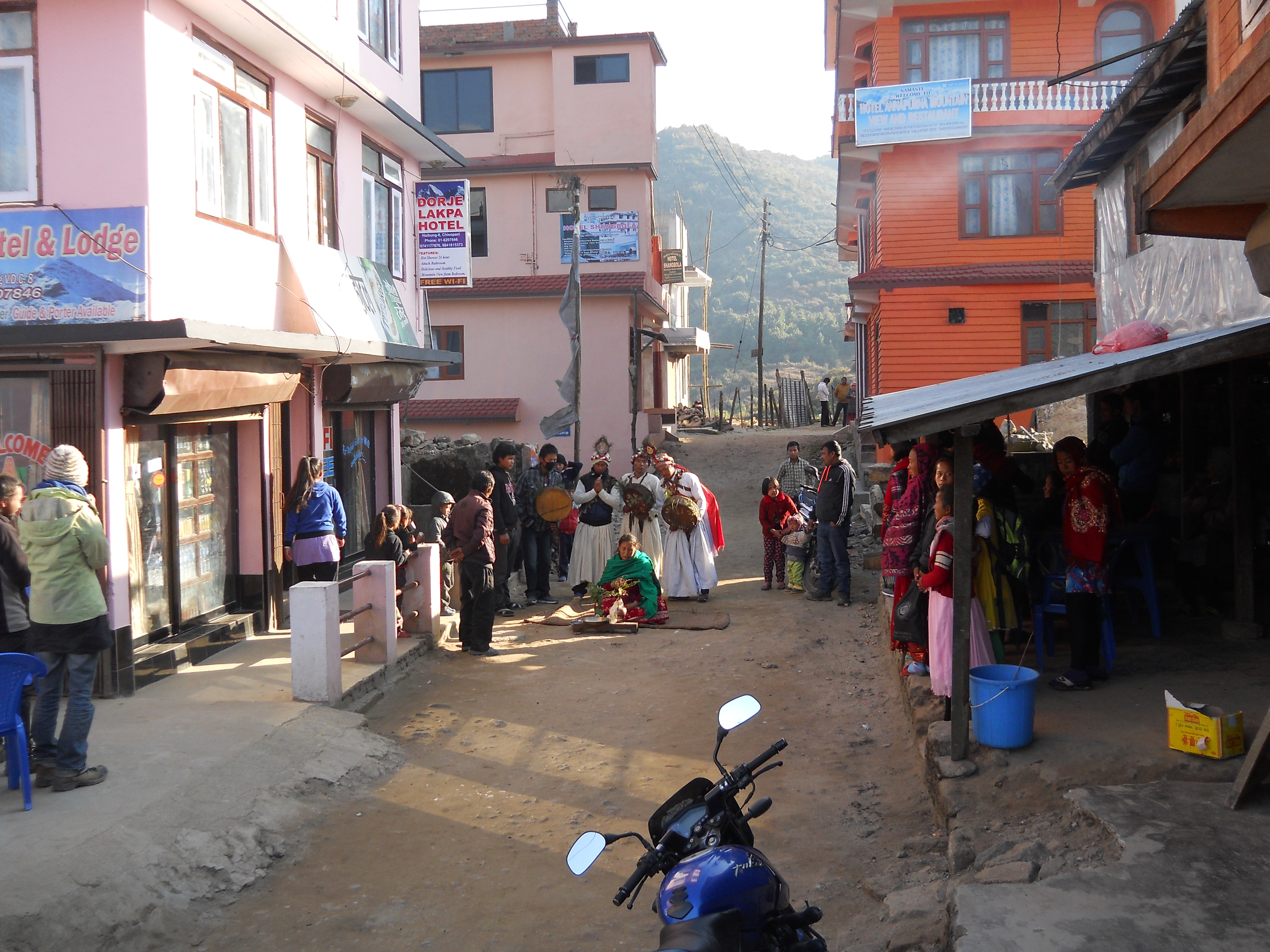
A picture of a local street

Haibung is a village in Sindhupalchok District in the Bagmati Zone of central Nepal. At the time of the 1991 Nepal census it had a population of 2418 and had 489 houses in the village.
