= Karkhali =

Coordinates: 27.8000°N 85.9600°E

Karkhali कर्थली
- Village development committee
- Interactive map of Karkhali
- Country: Nepal
- Zone: Bagmati Zone
- District: Sindhupalchok District

Population (1991)
  - Total: 3,200
  - Religions: Hindu
- Time zone: UTC+5:45 (Nepal Time)

Karkhali is a village in Sindhupalchok District in the Bagmati Zone of central Nepal. At the time of the 1991 Nepal census it had a population of 3200 and had 658 houses in the village.
