= Timpul Ghyangul =

Timpul Ghyangul टिम्पुल घ्याङ्गुल
- Village development committee
- Country: Nepal
- Zone: Bagmati Zone
- District: Sindhupalchok District

Population (1991)
  - Total: 2,571
  - Religions: Hindu
- Time zone: UTC+5:45 (Nepal Time)

Timpul Ghyangul is a village in Sindhupalchok District in the Bagmati Zone of central Nepal. At the time of the 1991 Nepal census it had a population of 2571 and had 591 houses in it.
