= Hagam =

Hagam Hagam
- Location in Nepal
- Coordinates: 27.85°N 85.82°E
- Country: Nepal
- Zone: Bagmati Zone
- District: Sindhupalchok District

Population (1991)
  - Total: 3,683
  - Religions: Buddhist
- Time zone: UTC+5:45 (Nepal Time)

Hagam is ward 6 of Jugal Rural Municipality in Sindhupalchok District in the Bagmati of central Nepal. At the time of the 1991 Nepal census it had a population of 3683 and had 703 houses in the village.
