= Pedku =

Petku पेट्कु
- Village development committee
- Location in Nepal
- Coordinates: 27.73°N 85.88°E
- Country: Nepal
- Zone: Bagmati Zone
- District: Sindhupalchok District

Area
  - Total: 5.2 km^{2} (2.0 sq mi)

Population (2014)
  - Total: 2,284
  - Religions: Hindu - Buddhism
- Time zone: UTC+5:45 (Nepal Time)

Pedku is a village in Sindhupalchok District in the Bagmati Zone of central Nepal. At the time of the 2013 Nepal census it had a population of 2284 and had 408 houses in the village. In 2011 the population was 1600 (863 females and 737 males) in 391 households.
