= Sindhukot =

Sindhukot सिन्धुकोट
- Village development committee
- Location in Nepal
- Coordinates: 27.83°N 85.52°E
- Country: Nepal
- Zone: Bagmati Zone
- District: Sindhupalchok District

Population (1991)
  - Total: 3,060
  - Religions: Hindu
- Time zone: UTC+5:45 (Nepal Time)

Sindhukot is a village in Sindhupalchok District in the Bagmati Zone of central Nepal. At the time of the 1991 Nepal census, it had a population of 3060 and had 582 houses in the village.
