= Lisankhu =

Village in Sindhupalchok District, Nepal

Lisankhu Pakhar लिसङ्खु पाखर
- Village
- Location in Nepal
- Coordinates: 27.66°N 85.85°E
- Country: Nepal
- Province: Bagmati Province
- District: Sindhupalchok District

Population (1991)
  - Total: 4,548
  - Religions: Buddhist
- Time zone: UTC+5:45 (Nepal Time)

Lisankhu is a village and former Village Development Committee in Sindhupalchok District in Bagmati Province of central Nepal. At the time of the 1991 Nepal census it had a population of 4548 and had 890 houses in the village.
