= Selang =

Selang सेलाङ
- Village development committee
- Location in Nepal
- Coordinates: 27.85°N 85.74°E
- Country: Nepal
- Zone: Bagmati Zone
- District: Sindhupalchok District

Population (1991)
  - Total: 2,356
  - Religions: Hindu
- Time zone: UTC+5:45 (Nepal Time)

Selang is a village in Sindhupalchok District in the Bagmati Zone of central Nepal. At the time of the 1991 Nepal census it had a population of 2356 and had 443 houses in the village.

== Literacy Rates ==
As per the 2001 census report, of the villages population, 1552 were unable to read or write, 70 only being able to read, and 746 being able to both read and write.
