= Sipal Kabhre =

Simpalkavre सिम्पालकाभ्रे (simpalkavre)
- Village development committee
- Nickname: simpal
- Location in Nepal
- Coordinates: 27.84°N 85.66°E
- Country: Nepal
- Zone: Bagmati Zone
- District: Sindhupalchok District

Population (1991)
  - Total: 2,586
  - Religions: Hindu
- Time zone: UTC+5:45 (Nepal Time)

Simpalkavre is a village in Sindhupalchok District in the Bagmati Zone of central Nepal. At the time of the 1991 Nepal census it had a population of 2586 and had 522 houses in the village.
