= Gunsakot =

Gunsa गुँसाकोट
- Village development committee
- Location in Nepal
- Coordinates: 27.93°N 85.70°E
- Country: Nepal
- Zone: Bagmati Zone
- District: Sindhupalchok District

Population (1991)
  - Total: 1,858
  - Religions: Buddhism
- Time zone: UTC+5:45 (Nepal Time)

Gunsa is a village in Sindhupalchok District in the Bagmati Zone of central Nepal. At the time of the 1991 Nepal census it had a population of 1858.
