= Tatopani, Sindhupalchok =

Tatopani तातोपानी
- Village development committee
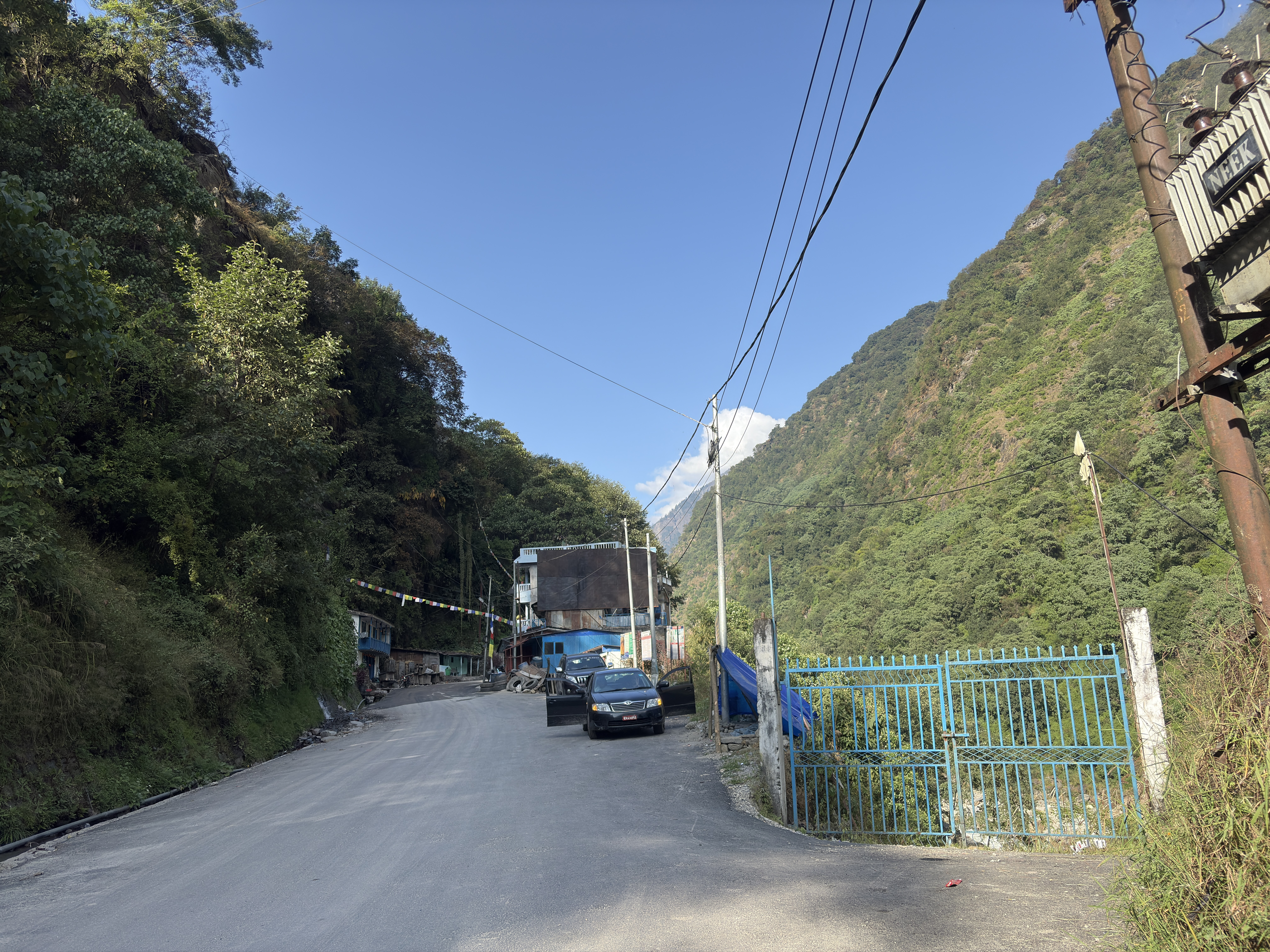
- Tatopani Village

- Location in Nepal
- Coordinates: 27.98°N 85.93°E
- Country: Nepal
- Zone: Bagmati Zone
- District: Sindhupalchok District

Population (1991)
  - Total: 3,102
  - Religions: Buddhist
- Time zone: UTC+5:45 (Nepal Time)

Tatopani (Nepali: तातोपानी) is a village in Sindhupalchok District in the Bagmati Zone of central Nepal. At the time of the 1991 Nepal census, it had a population of 3402 and had 616 houses in the village. The majority people are of ethnic Sherpa and Tamang. Historically and today, it is a huge trading post between Nepal and China. People living here speak Nepali and Tibetan. Shrestha Bipin is the mayor in Tatopani. The actual border crossing is at Kodari.

== 2015 Nepal earthquake ==
The village was affected by the earthquake on 25 April 2015. A joint coordination committee among all political parties in the three constituencies of the Sindhupalchok district was formed to carry out a rescue mission in the village. On 1 May, a Nepali Army rescue helicopter went 65 kilometres to Tatopani from Kathmandu to rescue 40 people.
