= Sunkhani, Sindhulpalchok =

Sunkhani, Sindhulpalchok सुनखानी
- Village development committee
- Location in Nepal
- Coordinates: 27.71°N 85.82°E
- Country: Nepal
- Zone: Bagmati Zone
- District: Sindhupalchok District

Population (1991)
  - Total: 2,721
  - Religions: Hindu
- Time zone: UTC+5:45 (Nepal Time)

Sunkhani, Sindhulpalchok is a village in Sindhupalchok District in the Bagmati Zone of central Nepal. At the time of the 1991 Nepal census it had a population of 2721 and had 548 houses in the village.
