= Banskharka =

Banskharka बाँसखर्क
- Village development committee
- Location in Nepal
- Coordinates: 27.90°N 85.60°E
- Country: Nepal
- Zone: Bagmati Zone
- District: Sindhupalchok District

Population (1991)
  - Total: 2,420
  - Religions: Hindu
- Time zone: UTC+5:45 (Nepal Time)

VDC Map of Sindhupalchok District

Banskharka (Newar: बाँसखर्क) is a village in Sindhupalchok District in the Bagmati Zone of central Nepal. At the time of the 1991 Nepal census it had a population of 2420 and had 517 houses in the village.
