= Kalika, Sindhupalchok =

Kalika कालिका
- Village development committee
- Location in Nepal
- Coordinates: 27.70°N 85.77°E
- Country: Nepal
- Zone: Bagmati Zone
- District: Sindhupalchok District

Population (1991)
  - Total: 2,190
  - Religions: Hindu
- Time zone: UTC+5:45 (Nepal Time)

Kalika is a village in Sindhupalchok District in the Bagmati Zone of central Nepal. At the time of the 1991 Nepal census it had a population of 2190 and had 415 houses in the village.
