= Langarche =

Langarche लाङ्गार्चे
- Village development committee
- Location in Nepal
- Coordinates: 27.86°N 85.61°E
- Country: Nepal
- Zone: Bagmati Zone
- District: Sindhupalchok District

Population (1991)
  - Total: 2,207
  - Religions: HinduBuddhist
- Time zone: UTC+5:45 (Nepal Time)

Langarche is a village in Sindhupalchok District in the Bagmati Zone of central Nepal. At the time of the 1991 Nepal census it had a population of 2207 and had 449 houses in the village.
