= Bahrabise =

Municipality in Bagmati Province, Nepal

Bahrabise बाह्रबिसे नगरपालिका
- Municipality
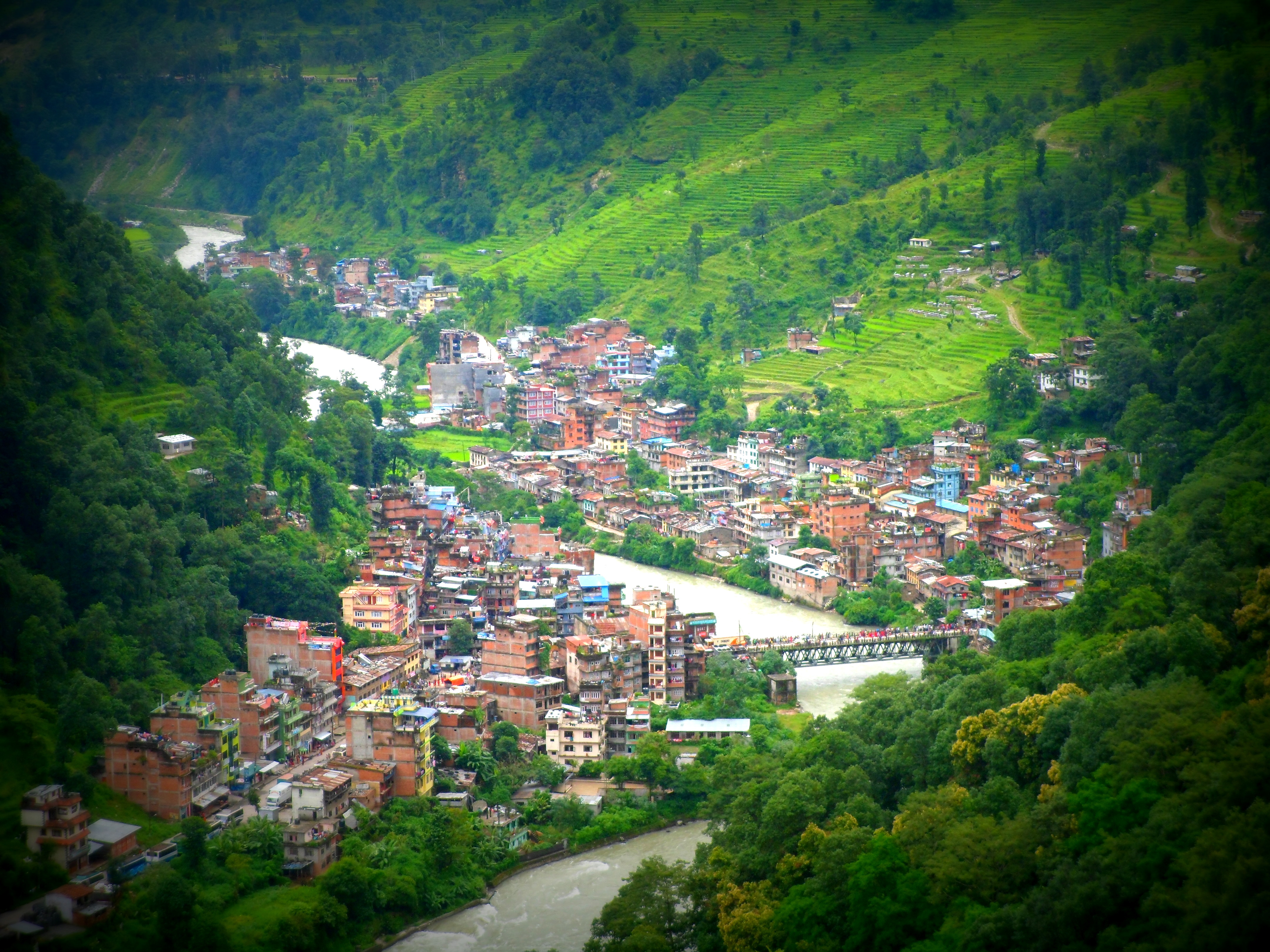
- Bahrabise Bazar as seen from Boksi Odar (Witch Cave).

- Location in Nepal
- Coordinates: 27.7866°N 85.8986°E
- Country: Nepal
- Zone: Bagmati Zone
- District: Sindhupalchok District

Government
  - Mayor: Bal Krishna Basnet
  - Deputy Mayor: Manju Tamang

Population (2016)
  - Total: 26,700
  - Religions: Hindu Buddhist
- Time zone: UTC+5:45 (Nepal Time)
- Postal code: 45302
- Area code: 011
- Website: http://bahrabisemun.gov.np

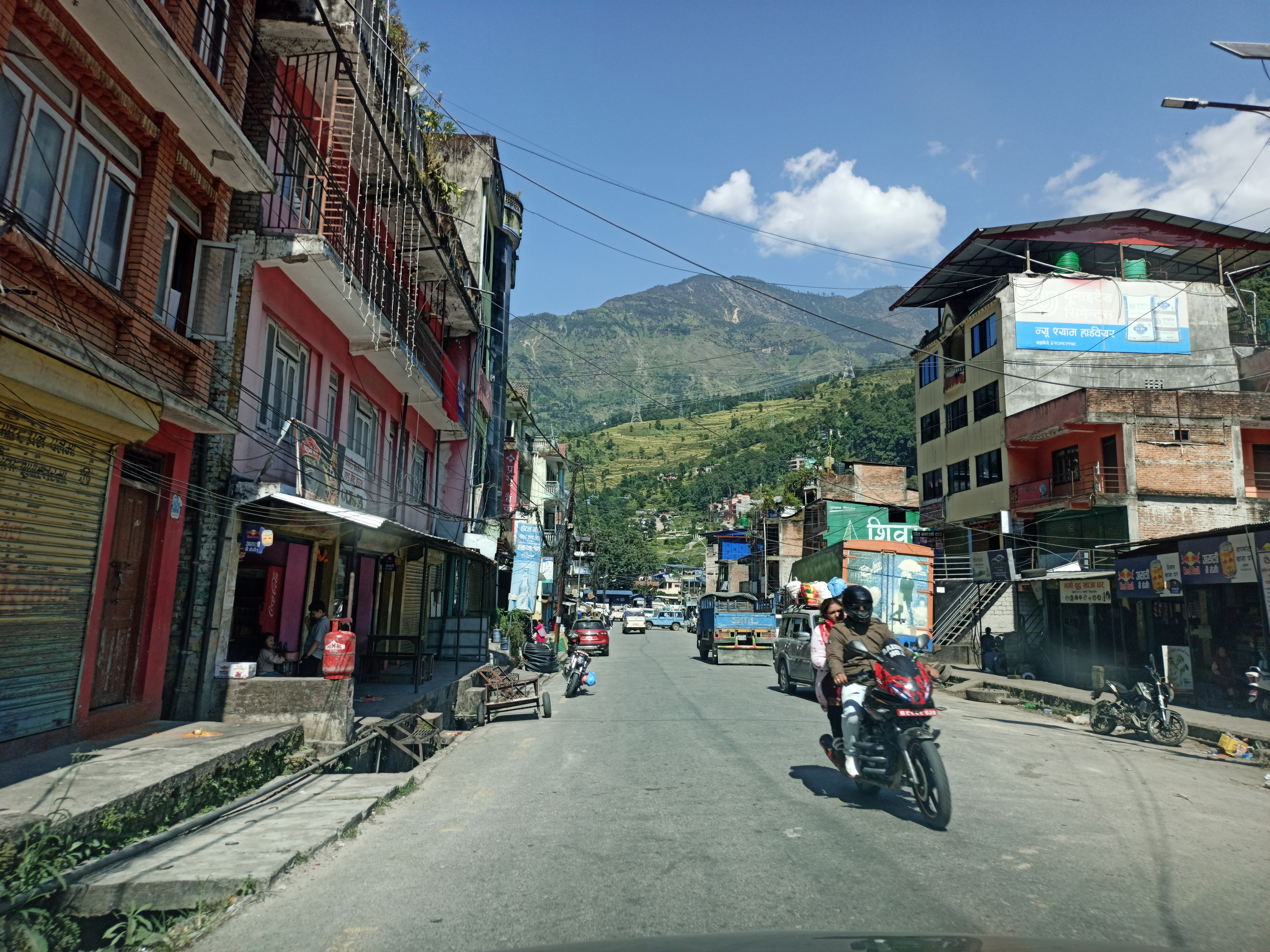
Bahrabise Bazar

Bahrabise (Nepali: बाह्रबिसे) is an urban municipality located in Sindhupalchok District of Bagmati Province of Nepal.

== Demographics ==
At the time of the 1991 Nepal census it had a population of 6832 and had 1161 houses in the village.

== Development ==
It lies on Araniko Highway - the 114 km-long highway which connects the capital city Kathmandu to the Chinese border in the north. The area touching the highway is very developed compared to other areas and hence called 'Bahrabise Bazar'. Each ward in the VDC is connected to the highway by graveled roads.

There are tourist places and electricity in each house of this VDC. The VDC has a telephone network (provided by Nepal Telecom) and mobile phone networks (provided by Nepal Telecom, Ncell and Smart Cell). There is broadband internet facility in places where PSTN telephone line has reached. There is a local cable television network which provides various TV channels in various parts of the VDC and outside.

The city has four private schools including Private Paradise Secondary School, Ketu English Boarding School, Chandeshwori English Boarding School and Keystone Public School and several other governmental schools. Shree Sharada Higher Secondary School and Shree Kshyamadevi Higher Secondary School are the most renowned governmental high school of this area.

Because of its proximity to the Chinese border, the businesses here are influenced by the Chinese market. Most of the people in Bahrabise Bazar are involved in business of the Chinese products including clothing, bedding, food items, electronic devices, etc.

== 2015 Nepal earthquake ==
The village was affected by the earthquake on 25 April 2015. A joint coordination committee among all political parties in the three constituencies of the Sindhupalchok district was formed to carry out a rescue mission in the village.

== Notable people ==
- Shree Krishna Shrestha – Nepalese actor and film producer, born in Bahrabise.
- Jayananda Lama – Nepalese folk singer and actor, born in Bahrabise.
- Roshan Shrestha – Nepalese journalist, born in Bahrabise.
- Mohan Bahadur Basnet – Nepalese politician and former government minister, born in Bahrabise.
- Saral Sahayatri Paudel – Nepalese politician and provincial minister, born in Bahrabise.
- Bikesh Kuthu – Nepalese football goalkeeper, born in Bahrabise.

== List of Government Schools in Bahrabise Municipality ==
Bahrabise Municipality has several government-run educational institutions that serve students from the local and surrounding areas. Among them:

- Shree Bachchhala Devi Higher Secondary School

== Climate ==
Climate data for Bahrabise, elevation 915 m (3,002 ft)
Month	Jan	Feb	Mar	Apr	May	Jun	Jul	Aug	Sep	Oct	Nov	Dec	Year
Mean daily maximum °C (°F)	17.2 (63.0)	19.3 (66.7)	23.6 (74.5)	27.5 (81.5)	28.3 (82.9)	27.3 (81.1)	26.7 (80.1)	26.8 (80.2)	26.2 (79.2)	25.2 (77.4)	21.8 (71.2)	18.5 (65.3)	24.0 (75.3)
Daily mean °C (°F)	11.6 (52.9)	13.3 (55.9)	17.3 (63.1)	21.2 (70.2)	22.5 (72.5)	23.2 (73.8)	23.1 (73.6)	23.0 (73.4)	22.2 (72.0)	20.2 (68.4)	15.8 (60.4)	12.6 (54.7)	18.8 (65.9)
Mean daily minimum °C (°F)	6.3 (43.3)	7.3 (45.1)	11.1 (52.0)	14.8 (58.6)	16.7 (62.1)	19.0 (66.2)	19.5 (67.1)	19.1 (66.4)	18.2 (64.8)	15.1 (59.2)	10.0 (50.0)	6.6 (43.9)	13.6 (56.6)
Average precipitation mm (inches)	14.0 (0.55)	27.0 (1.06)	55.0 (2.17)	114.0 (4.49)	176.0 (6.93)	495.0 (19.49)	837.0 (32.95)	803.0 (31.61)	399.0 (15.71)	91.0 (3.58)	10.0 (0.39)	23.0 (0.91)	3,044 (119.84)
Source: FAO
