= Baruwa =

Baruwa बरुवा
- Madhyabindu Metropolitan City
- Location in Nepal
- Coordinates: 28.05°N 85.59°E
- Country: Nepal
- Zone: Bagmati Zone
- District: Nawalpur District

Population (1991)
  - Total: 2,455
  - Religions: Hindu
- Time zone: UTC+5:45 (Nepal Time)

Baruwa is a village in Sindhupalchok District in the Bagmati Zone of central Nepal. At the time of the 1991 Nepal census it had a population of 2455 and had 558 houses in the village.
