= Mahankal, Sindhulpalchok =

Mahankal महांकाल
- Village development committee
- Location in Nepal
- Coordinates: 27.89°N 85.51°E
- Country: Nepal
- Zone: Bagmati Zone
- District: Sindhupalchok District

Population (1991)
  - Total: 4,086
  - Religions: Hindu Buddhist
- Time zone: UTC+5:45 (Nepal Time)

Mahankal is a village in Sindhupalchok District in the Bagmati Zone of central Nepal. At the time of the 1991 Nepal census it had a population of 4086 and had 803 houses in the village.
