= Marming =

Marming मार्मिङ
- Village development committee
- Location in Nepal
- Coordinates: 27.85°N 85.94°E
- Country: Nepal
- Zone: Bagmati Zone
- District: Sindhupalchok District

Population (1991)
  - Total: 2,918
  - Religions: Hindu
- Time zone: UTC+5:45 (Nepal Time)

Marming is a village in Sindhupalchok District in the Bagmati Zone of central Nepal. At the time of the 1991 Nepal census it had a population of 2918 and had 533 houses in the village.
