= Yamunadanda =

Yamanadanda यामानाडाँडा
- Village development committee
- Location in Nepal
- Coordinates: 27.72°N 85.79°E
- Country: Nepal
- Zone: Bagmati Zone
- District: Sindhupalchok District

Population (2021)
  - Total: 2,500
  - Religions: Hindu
- Time zone: UTC+5:45 (Nepal Time)

Yamanadanda is a village in Sindhupalchok District in the Bagmati Zone of central Nepal. At the time of the 1991 Nepal census it had a population of 1664 and had 303 houses in it.
