= Thangpalkot =

Thangpalkot थाङपालकोट
- Village development committee [Now Panchpokhari Rural Municipality]
- Location in Nepal
- Coordinates: 27.95°N 85.69°E
- Country: Nepal
- Zone: Bagmati Zone
- District: Sindhupalchok District

Population (1991)
  - Total: 2,786
  - Religions: Buddhism Hinduism Christianity
- Time zone: UTC+5:45 (Nepal Time)

Thangpalkot is a village in Sindhupalchok District in the Bagmati Zone of central Nepal. At the time of the 1991 Nepal census it had a population of 2786.
