= Melamchi =

Melamchi Municipality मेलम्ची नगरपालिका Melamchi
- Town
- Location in province Melamchi Municipality (Nepal)
- Coordinates: 27.83°N 85.56°E
- Country: Nepal
- Province: Bagmati Province
- District: Sindhupalchok District
- Established: 16 December 2014

Government
  - Type: Mayor-council
  - Mayor: Aaitman Tamang
  - Deputy Mayor: Uma pradhan

Population (2013)
  - Total: 45,343
  - Religions: Hinduism
- Time zone: UTC+5:45 (NST)
- Website: www.melamchimun.gov.np

Melamchi is a municipality in Sindhupalchok District in the Bagmati Province of central Nepal. The total population of Melamchi Municipality is 45,343, according to the 2011 population census. In the 2011 census, there were 21,729 males and 23,614 females, and the municipality had 11 wards. The CBS data of 2074 showed an increase of 13,471 people.

== Culture ==
Hindu culture dominates the settlements of the valley areas while Buddhist culture is prevalent in the high mountain settlements. The mid-hill settlements of the valley are the meeting ground of the two cultures in the municipality. There are more than 11 Hindu temples and shrines, as well as about 14 monasteries in the Melamchi watershed.

== Climate ==
The lower part of Melamchi valley has a sub-tropical climate, while the upper part has a cool temperate climate. The upper part of the valley receives more rainfall than in the lower part. Heavy rainfall occurs in June, July and August. Rainfall in January and February is the lowest. The annual average rainfall in the Melamchi basin is about 2800 mm, which is concentrated mostly during four months of the monsoon from mid-June to mid-September. Average annual rainfall conditions vary considerably by location in the valley. In general, average annual rainfall is low at lower elevation and is relatively high in the higher elevation. The average annual rainfall recorded for the period of 1991-1996 is 3,410 mm.

Climate data for Melamchi (Bahunepati), elevation 845 m (2,772 ft)
Month	Jan	Feb	Mar	Apr	May	Jun	Jul	Aug	Sep	Oct	Nov	Dec	Year
Mean daily maximum °C (°F)	19.6 (67.3)	22.3 (72.1)	27.4 (81.3)	31.4 (88.5)	32.0 (89.6)	31.2 (88.2)	29.4 (84.9)	29.1 (84.4)	28.7 (83.7)	28.2 (82.8)	24.0 (75.2)	20.4 (68.7)	27.0 (80.6)
Mean daily minimum °C (°F)	8.1 (46.6)	9.1 (48.4)	13.4 (56.1)	16.5 (61.7)	18.9 (66.0)	21.4 (70.5)	21.6 (70.9)	21.3 (70.3)	20.3 (68.5)	17.1 (62.8)	11.9 (53.4)	8.3 (46.9)	15.7 (60.2)
Average precipitation mm (inches)	12.0 (0.47)	20.6 (0.81)	31.9 (1.26)	55.8 (2.20)	122.2 (4.81)	292.8 (11.53)	444.6 (17.50)	441.8 (17.39)	250.4 (9.86)	65.0 (2.56)	8.2 (0.32)	11.1 (0.44)	1,756.4 (69.15)
Source 1: Australian National University
Source 2: Japan International Cooperation Agency (precipitation)

== Education ==
About 57 percent of the population are literate. Over 18 percent has received some form of education without attending school, around 12 percent have some primary level of education, over 15 percent have completed high school, and over 11 percent have completed degree. There are 78 primary schools, 10 lower secondary schools, 9 secondary schools, and 2 higher secondary schools. In addition, there are 6 boarding schools run by the private sector.

Some schools in Melamchi Municipality include:

- Shree Indreswori Secondary School

== 2015 Nepal earthquake ==
The village was affected by the earthquake on 25 April 2015. A joint coordination committee among all political parties in the three constituencies of the Sindhupalchok district was formed to carry out a rescue mission in the village.
