= Bhote Namlang =

Bhote Namlang भोटे नाम्लाङ
- Village development committee
- Location in Nepal
- Coordinates: 27.89°N 85.67°E
- Country: Nepal
- Zone: Bagmati Zone
- District: Sindhupalchok District

Population (1991)
  - Total: 2,867
  - Religions: Buddhist Hindu and Christian
- Time zone: UTC+5:45 (Nepal Time)

Bhote Namlang is a former Village Development Committee and now a village in Sindhupalchok District in the Bagmati Zone of central Nepal. At the time of the 1991 Nepal census, it had a population of 2867 and had 579 houses in the village and at 2001
