= Motang =

Bhotang भोताङ
- Village development committee
- Location in Nepal
- Coordinates: 28.05°N 85.67°E
- Country: Nepal
- Zone: Bagmati Zone
- District: Sindhupalchok District

Population (1991)
  - Total: 2,750
  - Buddhism: Buddhist
- Time zone: UTC+5:45 (Nepal Time)

Bhotang is a village in Sindhupalchok District in the Bagmati Zone of central Nepal. At the time of the 1991 Nepal census it had a population of 2750. 90 percent of its inhabitants are Tamang followed by Bishwakarma and Newar. There are three schools run by government. Among them, one is Bhotang Devi Secondary School. There is one bus that runs to and fro from Kathmandu once a day. The road condition is rough and dusty. Bhotang lies in Panchpokhari Rural Municipality. Mr. Ngima Chhiring Tamang is the ward chairman of Bhotang-3 ward.

This ward consists of Yarsa, Migaun and Chhimti villages. Chhimti is the farthest village and takes about 30 minutes to reach by walking. There is no road accessibility after that. A hanging bridge is the gateway to holy Panchpokhari (Five lakes) which is 19 kilometres hike at the altitude of 4100 meters. Every year, during "Janai Purnima" in the month of Nepali month Bhadra, many number of tourists go on a pilgrimage. A fair is organized and the festival is celebrated with much joy. Temporary hotels are established by the local people of Chhimti and nearby villages.

Foreign employment is the major occupation of this village. Villagers mostly migrate to India in search of occupation. There are shops (grocery, cosmetics, electronics, clothing). Small hotels and restaurants are there where tourists can stay and eat.
