= Thokarpa =

Thokarpa ठोकर्पा
- Village development committee
- Location in Nepal
- Coordinates: 27.68°N 85.79°E
- Country: Nepal
- Zone: Bagmati Zone
- District: Sindhupalchok District

Population (2013)
  - Total: 6,243
  - Religions: Hindu
- Time zone: UTC+5:45 (Nepal Time)

Thokarpa is a village in Sindhupalchok District in the Bagmati Zone of central Nepal. At the time of the 2013 Nepal census it had a population of 6,243 and had 1,047 houses in it.

== Popular Villages in Thokarpa ==
Thokarpa is a village development committee with many sattlements. Gairigaun, Guthigaun, Kotgaun, Bhalukharka, Jamune, Tinghare, Dandakateri, Mulkharka, Chinde, Gaire, Ghartigaun, Mane, Bhanjyang, Titre, Simle, Kafle, Laharetol, etc. are the popular villages.

Newly, after starting the Chehere Thokarpa road. 12 Kilo became a hub of some village of Kavrepalanchok district and eastern settlements of Thokarpa VDC.Today there is road from sukute to different part of this village.
