= Thampal Chhap =

Thangpaldhap थाङ्गपाल धाप
- Village development committee
- Location in Nepal
- Coordinates: 27.91°N 85.64°E
- Country: Nepal
- Zone: Bagmati Zone
- District: Sindhupalchok District

Population (1991)
  - Total: 2,994
  - Religions: Hindu
- Time zone: UTC+5:45 (Nepal Time)

Thangpal Dhap is a village in Sindhupalchok District in the Bagmati Zone of central Nepal. At the time of the 1991 Nepal census, it had a population of 2994 and had 581 houses in the village.
