= Sindhupalchowk District =

District in Bagmati Pradesh, Nepal

Sindhupalchok District सिन्धुपाल्चोक जिल्ला
- District
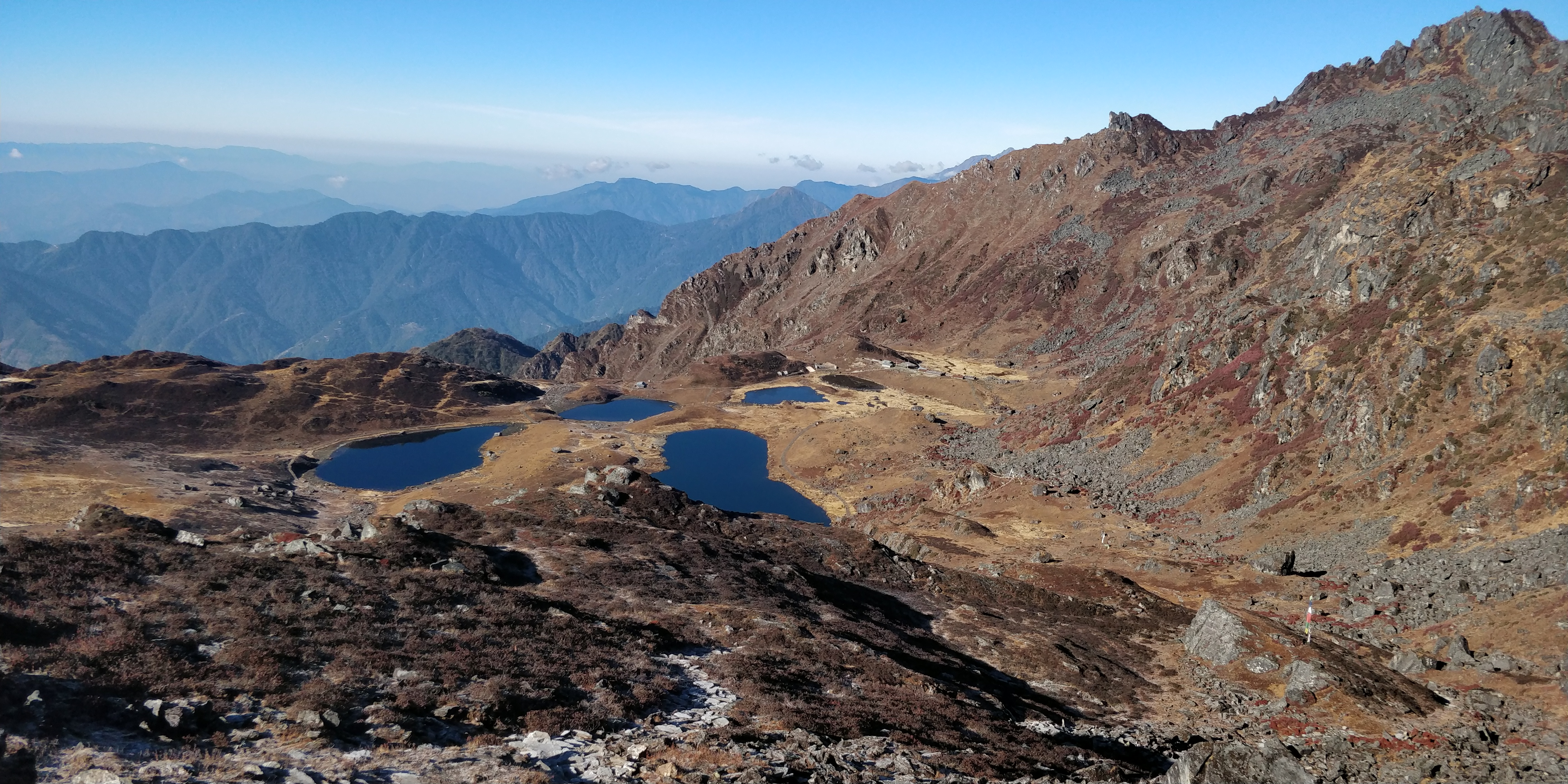
- Panch Pokhari lakes

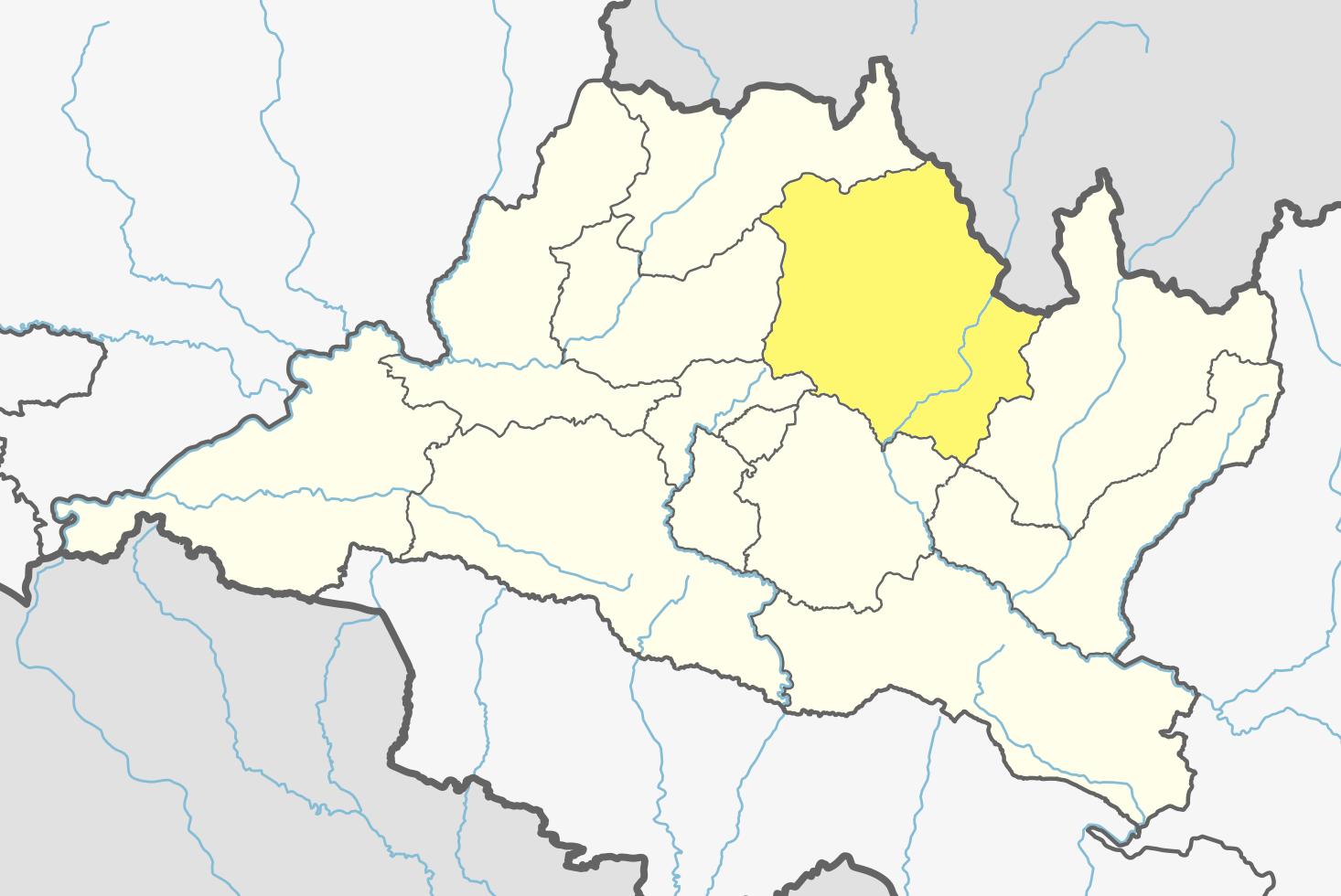
- Location of the district within Bagmati Province
- Coordinates: 27°46′N 85°42′E
- Country: Nepal
- Province: Bagmati Province
- Admin HQ.: Chautara

Government
  - Type: Coordination committee
  - Body: DCC, Sindhupalchok

Area
  - Total: 2,542 km^{2} (981 sq mi)
- Highest elevation: 7,080 m (23,230 ft)
- Lowest elevation: 300 m (980 ft)

Population (2011)
  - Total: 287,818
  - Density: 113.2/km^{2} (293.3/sq mi)
- Time zone: UTC+05:45 (NPT)
- Website: dccsindhupalchowk.gov.np

Sindhupalchok District (or Sindhupalchok, Nepali: सिन्धुपाल्चोक जिल्ला [sindʱupalt͡sok]) is a part of Bagmati Province and one of the seventy-seven districts of Nepal, with an area of 2,542 km^{2} (981 sq mi). The district's headquarters is in Chautara. In 2006, 336,478 people resided in 79 village development committees; in 2011 there were 287,798.

== Geography ==
The climatic zones found in the district comprise:

Climate zone	Elevation range	% of area
Upper Tropical	300 to 1,000 meters 1,000 to 3,300 ft.	6.0%
Subtropical	1,000 to 2,000 meters 3,300 to 6,600 ft.	37.2%
Temperate	2,000 to 3,000 meters 6,400 to 9,800 ft.	24.5%
Subalpine	3,000 to 4,000 meters 9,800 to 13,100 ft.	15.1%
Alpine	4,000 to 5,000 meters 13,100 to 16,400 ft.	7.8%
Nival	above 5,000 meters	9.1%

== Demographics ==
Historical population
Census year	Pop.	±% p.a.
1981	232,326	—
1991	261,025	+1.17%
2001	305,857	+1.60%
2011	287,798	−0.61%
2021	262,852	−0.90%
Source: Citypopulation

At the time of the 2021 Nepal census, Sindhupalchowk District had a population of 262,624. 7.18% of the population is under 5 years of age. It has a literacy rate of 68.04% and a sex ratio of 1033 females per 1000 males. 107,840 (41.06%) lived in municipalities.

Castes/ethnic groups in Sindhupalchowk District (2021)
1. Tamang (36.8%)
2. Chhetri (16.9%)
3. Newar (9.88%)
4. Bahun (8.46%)
5. Kami (3.63%)
6. Sherpa (3.58%)
7. Dasnami (3.17%)
8. Majhi (2.75%)
9. Thami (2.09%)
10. Damai (1.96%)
11. Magar (1.75%)
12. Sarki (1.73%)
13. Hyolmo (1.50%)
14. Danuwar (1.30%)
15. Other Hill Janjati (2.66%)
16. Other Khas (1.28%)
17. Others (0.51%)

Ethnicity wise: Hill Janjatis were the largest group, making up 52% of the population. Tamangs were the largest Hill Janjati group, making up 37% of the population, while there are a small collection of Sherpas, Thamis and Hyolmos who live in the higher mountains. Khas are the second largest group, making up 36% of the population. Newars were the third largest group, making up 10% of the population.

Languages of Sindhupalchowk district (2021)
1. Nepali (47.5%)
2. Tamang (35.6%)
3. Nepal Bhasha (6.30%)
4. Sherpa (3.59%)
5. Thami (1.79%)
6. Hyolmo (1.58%)
7. Danuwar (1.09%)
8. Others (2.58%)

At the time of the 2021 census, 47.47% of the population spoke Nepali, 35.60% Tamang, 6.30% Nepal Bhasha, 3.59% Sherpa, 1.79% Thami, 1.58% Hyolmo and 1.09% Danuwar as their first language. In 2011, 53.3% of the population spoke Nepali as their first language.

Religion in Sindhupalchowk District (2021)
Religion	Percent
Hinduism	54.17%
Buddhism	41.41%
Christianity	2.49%
Kirat Mundhum	1.13%
Prakriti	0.58%
Other or not stated	0.23%

== Administration ==
The district consists of 12 local levels, out of which three are municipalities and nine are rural municipalities. These are as follows:

- Chautara Sangachowkgadhi
- Bahrabise
- Melamchi
- Balephi Rural Municipality
- Sunkoshi Rural Municipality
- Indrawati Rural Municipality
- Jugal Rural Municipality
- Panchpokhari Thangpal Rural Municipality
- Bhotekoshi Rural Municipality
- Lisankhu Pakhar Rural Municipality
- Helambu Rural Municipality
- Tripurasundari Rural Municipality

=== Former towns and villages ===
Prior to the restructuring of the district in January 2013, the major towns were Khadichaur, Chautara, Bahrabise, Melamchi, Jalbire and Tatopani.

- Andheri
- Atarpur
- Badegau
- Bahrabise Municipality
- Bahunepati
- Balephi
- Bansbari
- Banskharka
- Baramchi
- Baruwa
- Batase
- Bhimtar
- Bhotang
- Bhote Namlang
- Bhotechaur
- Bhotsipa
- Binjel
- Chanaute
- Chautara Municipality
- Chehere Bazar
- Choukati
- Dhade
- Dhuskot
- Dubarchaur
- Gati
- Ghorthali
- Ghumthang
- Gloche
- Gumba
- Gunsakot
- Hagam
- Haibung
- Helambu
- Ichok
- Irkhu
- Jalbire
- Jethal
- Jyamire
- Kadambas
- Kalika
- Kalleri, Phulpingkot
- Karkhali
- Kattike
- Khadichaur
- Kiul
- Kunchok
- Lamosanghu
- Langarche
- Lisankhu
- Listikot
- Mahankal
- Manekharka
- Maneshwara
- Marming
- Melamchi Municipality
- Motang
- Mude
- Nawalpur
- Noubise
- Pagretar
- Palchok
- Pangtang
- Petaku
- Phatakshila
- Phulping Katti
- Phulpingdanda
- Phulpingkot

Pipaldanda

- Piskar
- Ramche
- Sangachok
- Selang
- Shildhunga
- Sikharpur
- Sikre Bazar
- Simpani-Kubinde
- Sindhukot
- Sipa Pokhare
- Sipal Kavre
- Sukute Bazar
- Sunkhani
- Syaule Bazar
- Talamarang
- Tatopani
- Tauthali
- Tekanpur
- Thakani
- Thampal Chhap
- Thangpalkot
- Thokarpa
- Thulo Dhading
- Thulo Pakhar
- Thulo Sirubari
- Thum Pakhar
- Timpul Ghyangul
- Yamanadanda

== Education ==
There are more than half a dozen colleges offering bachelor's degrees in Sindhupalchok. More than 25 schools are running +2 level programs. Chautara campus has just started science course at +2 level. There are generally one or more high schools in each VDC within Sindhupalchok. Chautara Campus, Thokarpa Community Campus, Sunkoshi Campus, and Jalbire Valley Campus are some leading educational institutions. Higher-level education is only available in Chautara, Bahrabise, Kavre and Kathmandu.

There are more than 25 private schools in the district. These include Sadabahar Academy (established in 2063 BS), Ekta Boarding High School (established in 2050 BS), Jugal Boarding High School (established in 2047 BS), Ketu English School, Nirvana Academy, Chandeswari English School and Private Paradise Secondary School.

== Newspaper and magazines ==
There are more than 10 newspapers that publish news from the district and several monthly magazines, which have played a vital role in providing immediate news and information to the people in printed format.

Daily News Paper:

- Sarbapaksha Daily (सर्वपक्ष दैनिक), Exu.Editor: Sundar Shireesh

Weekly News Paper:

- Sindhusandesh (सिन्धुसन्देश) is one of the oldest local newspapers. Weekly. Editor: Suresh Kasaju.
- Bihanee Times weekly (विहानी टाईम्स साप्ताहिक), Editor: Sundar Shireesh
- Okhereni weekly (ओखरेनी साप्ताहिक), Editor: Sitaram Ghimire
- Sindhu Prabaha weekly (सिन्धुप्रवाह साप्ताहिक), Editor: Dinesh Thapa
- Nayapani Sandesh weekly (नयाँपानी सन्देश साप्ताहिक), Editor: Kedar Majhi
- Sindhu Jwala weekly (सिन्धुज्वाला साप्ताहिक), Editor: Dinesh Dulal
- Janata Patra weekly (जनतापत्र साप्ताहिक), Editor: Tika Subedhi
- Sindhu Post weekly (सिन्धु पोष्ट साप्ताहिक), Editor: Ramchandra Nepal
- Sindhu Bulanda weekly (सिन्धुबुलन्द साप्ताहिक), Editor: Chitra Mijar

Magazine:

- Sindhu Yatra monthly (सिन्धु यात्रा), Editor: Gyanendra Timalsina
- Spandan Gunjan literature magazine (स्पन्दन गुञ्जन साहित्यिक त्रैमासिक), Editor: Sundar Shireesh

Online media include:

- jugalkhabar.com (जुगल खबर), Editor: Sundar Shireesh
- sindhukhabar.com (सिन्धु खबर), Editor: Bhupendra Bhandari
- www.globalpatee.com (ग्लाेबलपाटी डटकम),Editor: Sundar Shireesh
- newsaraniko.com (न्यूज अरनिको), Editor: Naniram Nepal

Radio broadcasters:

- Radio Sindhu 105.0 MHz
- Helambu FM 89.6 MHz
- Radio Melamchi 107.2 MHz
- Radio Sunkoshi 105.6 MHz
- Radio Jugal 98.1 MHz
- Sindhu FM 102.8 MHz
- Radio Planet 89.1 MHz
- Youth FM 97.5 MHz
- Radio Mission 105.3 MHz
- Radio Lokapriya Netrajyoti 106.6 MHz

== Health care ==
Following is the data obtained from the PHASE Nepal website:

- Central/regional/zonal hospitals: 0
- District hospitals: 1
- Primary healthcare centres: 2
- Health posts: 11
- Sub-health posts: 65
- Number of doctors: 6
- Number of nurses: 95

Although there is a district hospital as well as primary healthcare centers, this is not enough for providing health services. The small health centers in many VDCs are without auxiliary health workers (AHWs), auxiliary nurse midwives (ANMs) and community health workers (CHWs). So, people seeking emergency health assistance have to travel a long distance to major centres or Kathmandu, or end up dying because of lack of treatment. Many people still believe in Dhami and Jhakri and are against taking medicine or going to hospital for treatment.

An NGO, PHASE Nepal, provides many healthcare facilities and training programs in two VDCs: Phulpingkot and Hagam. Many people residing in these VDCs have benefited from the program.

== Tourism ==
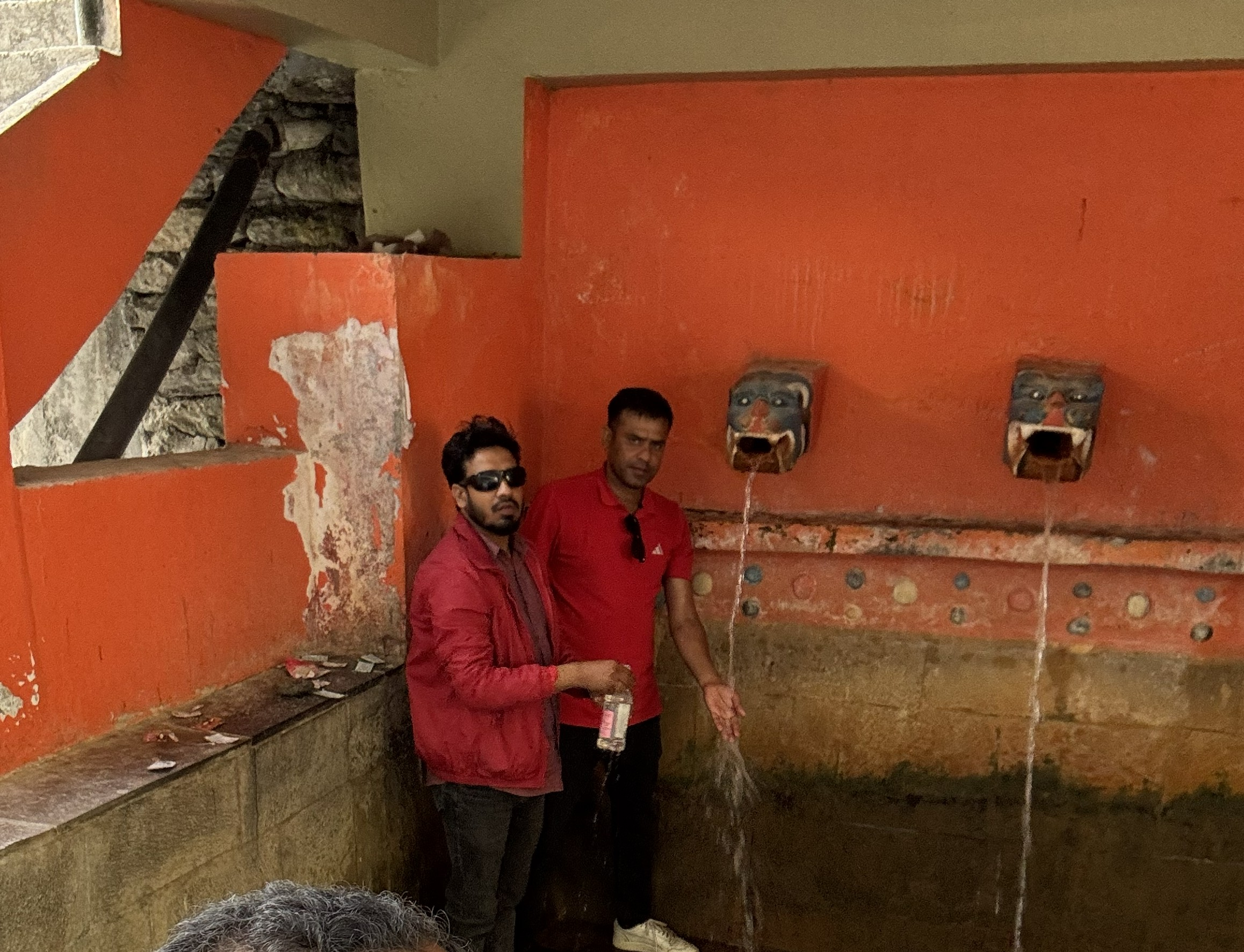
Tatopani Hot spring

Although it is one of the least developed, this district can be one of the finest tourist destinations, attracting both national and international tourists. The tourist attractions of this district include Langtang National Park, Langtang Himal, Jugal Himal, Panch Pokhari, Tato Pani, and Gaurati Bhimeswar. Panch Pokhari, Bhairav kunda are the destination for trekking.

Religious places in Sindhupalchowk:

- Gaurati Bhimeshwor temple (Chautara, Pipaldanda)
- Tauthali Mai temple (Bharabise)
- Sunkoshi Kafeshwar Mahadev temple
- Kshemadevi temple
- Palchowk temple (Helambhu)
- Larke Ghyang (Helambhu)

Tatopani (hot spring), near the border with China, is popular as a pilgrimage location.

Sun Koshi and Bhote Koshi rivers are famous for rafting. Bungy jumping over the Bhote Koshi river is another attraction.

== Arts and culture ==
Notable entertainers from the district include actors Shree Krishna Shrestha (1967–2014), Sunita Dulal and Jeetu Nepal, and singer Raju Lama.

== 2015 earthquake ==
On 25 April 2015, an earthquake occurred with a magnitude of 7.9M and center 15 km (9.3 mi) beneath Barpak village, Gorkha, between Kathmandu and Pokhara. Several aftershocks were reported in the region. There were also fears that the earthquake, or aftershocks, could trigger further flooding or landslides such as in 2014.

Steep mountains and narrow roads in the Sindhupalchok District drastically slowed rescue efforts. It took vehicles three hours to arrive from Kathmandu. Electricity and communication were cut off across in the district, so residents were isolated. Of the 66,688 houses in the district, 64,565 (96.8%) were destroyed.

As of 23 August 2015, more than 3,550 people were recorded to have died in the district as a result, and thousands of people were injured, of which 614 were sent to Kathmandu for treatment. Over 40 people were rescued from debris, and more than 3,000 people were still missing.

A UH-1Y Huey helicopter delivering relief supplies crashed in Sindhupalchowk District about eight miles north of Charikot, with six US Marines and two Nepalese soldiers aboard.

== See also ==
- Thangmi language
