= Bhumlu Rural Municipality =

Bhumlu (RM) भुमलु गाउँपालिका
- Rural Municipality
- Location Bhumlu (RM) (Nepal)
- Coordinates: 27°36′54″N 85°45′07″E
- Country: Nepal
- Province: Bagmati
- District: Kavrepalanchowk
- Wards: 10
- Established: 10 March 2017

Government
  - Type: Rural Council
  - Chairperson: Mr. Prem Bahadur Bhujel Brihat
  - Vice-chairperson: Mr. Jitendramaan Tamang (Dawa Lama)

Area
  - Total: 91 km^{2} (35 sq mi)

Population (2011)
  - Total: 18,916
  - Density: 210/km^{2} (540/sq mi)
- Time zone: UTC+5:45 (Nepal Standard Time)
- Headquarter: Salle Bhumlu
- Website: bhumlumun.gov.np

Bhumlu is a Rural municipality located within the Kavrepalanchowk District of the Bagmati Province of Nepal. The municipality spans 91 square kilometres (35 sq mi) of area, with a total population of 18,916 according to a 2011 Nepal census.

On March 10, 2017, the Government of Nepal restructured the local level bodies into 753 new local level structures. The previous units of local governance, namely Saping, Simthali, Bekhsimle Dhartigaun, Choubas, Salle Bhumlu Kolati Bhumlu, Phalante Bhumlu, Bhumlutar, Jyamdi Mandan and Dolalghat VDCs were merged to form Bhumlu Rural Municipality. Bhumlu is divided into 10 wards, with Salle Bhumlu declared the administrative center of the rural municipality.

== Demographics ==
At the time of the 2011 Nepal census, Bhumlu Rural Municipality had a population of 18,929. Of these, 65.3% spoke Nepali, 24.8% Tamang, 5.0% Majhi, 4.0% Newar, 0.5% Maithili, 0.1% Pahari and 0.2% other languages as their first language.

In terms of ethnicity/caste, 25.3% were Tamang, 22.8% Chhetri, 13.0% Pahari, 10.0% Hill Brahmin, 7.2% Newar, 6.9% Majhi, 4.0% Kami, 4.0% Sanyasi/Dasnami, 1.6% Sarki, 1.5% Damai/Dholi, 1.4% Gharti/Bhujel, 1.2% Thakuri, 0.2% Bhote, 0.1% Hajam/Thakur, 0.1% Kayastha, 0.1% Magar, 0.1% other Terai and 0.4% others.

In terms of religion, 75.3% Buddhist, 20.8% Hindu, 1.1% Christian, 0.6% Prakriti and 0.3% others.

In terms of literacy, 58.1% could read and write, 3.2% could only read and 38.6% could neither read nor write.
