= Chaurideurali Rural Municipality =

Chaunrideurali (RM) चौरीदेउराली गाउँपालिका
- Rural Municipality
- Location Chaunrideurali (RM) (Nepal)
- Coordinates: 27.55°N 85.81°E
- Country: Nepal
- Province: Bagmati
- District: Kavrepalanchowk
- Wards: 9
- Established: 10 March 2017

Government
  - Type: Rural Council
  - Chairperson: Mrs.Renuka Chaulagain
  - Vice-chairperson: Mr.Sher Bahadur Lama
  - Information Technology Officer: Mr.Bishnu Chaulagain

Area
  - Total: 98 km^{2} (38 sq mi)

Population (2021)
  - Total: 14,076
  - Density: 140/km^{2} (370/sq mi)
- Time zone: UTC+5:45 (Nepal Standard Time)
- Headquarter: Dhandakharka Bhanjyang
- Website: chaunrideuralimun.gov.np

Chaurideurali is a Rural municipality located within the Kavrepalanchowk District of the Bagmati Province of Nepal. The municipality spans 98 square kilometres (38 sq mi) of area, with a total population of 14,076 according to a 2021 Nepal census.

On March 10, 2017, the Government of Nepal restructured the local level bodies into 753 new local level structures. The previous Sanowangthali, Nagre Gagarche, Majhi Feda, Dhuseni Siwalaya, Gothpani Pokhari Chauri, Kartike Deurali, Madan Kundari, Birtadeurali and Gothpani VDCs were merged to form Chaurideurali Rural Municipality. Chaunrideurali is divided into 9 wards, with Dhadkharka bhanjyang declared the administrative center of the rural municipality.

== Demographics ==
At the time of the 2011 Nepal census, Chaunrideurali Rural Municipality had a population of 20,829. Of these, 62.2% spoke Nepali, 29.8% Tamang, 6.3% Newar, 1.2% Majhi, 0.2% Maithili, 0.1% Pahari, and 0.1% other languages as their first languages.

In terms of ethnicity/caste, 36.0% were Hill Brahmin, 30.0% Tamang, 9.4% Chhetri, 7.5% Newar, 3.8% Kami, 3.3% Sanyasi/Dasnami, 2.5% Damai/Dholi, 2.4% Majhi, 1.5% Pahari, 1.1% Sarki, 0.9% Gharti/Bhujel, 0.8% Magar, 0.2% Badi, 0.2% other Dalit, 0.2% Thakuri, 0.1% Chamar/Harijan/Ram and 0.2% others.

In terms of religion, 69.1% were Hindu, 30.1% Buddhist, 0.7% Christian and 0.1% others.

In terms of literacy, 58.6% could read and write, 3.0% could only read and 38.3% could neither read nor write.
