= Roshi Rural Municipality =

Roshi (RM) रोशी गाउँपालिका
- Rural Municipality
- Location Roshi (RM) (Nepal)
- Coordinates: 27.52°N 85.89°E
- Country: Nepal
- Province: Bagmati
- District: Kavrepalanchowk
- Wards: 12
- Established: 10 March 2017

Government
  - Type: Rural Council
  - Chairperson: Mr. D.B. Lama
  - Vice-chairperson: Mrs. Laxmi Ureti

Area
  - Total: 176 km^{2} (68 sq mi)

Population (2011)
  - Total: 28,746
  - Density: 163/km^{2} (423/sq mi)
- Time zone: UTC+5:45 (Nepal Standard Time)
- Headquarter: Katunje Besi
- Website: roshimun.gov.np

Roshi is a Rural municipality located within the Kavrepalanchowk District of the Bagmati Province of Nepal. The municipality spans 176 square kilometres (68 sq mi) of area, with a total population of 28,746 according to a 2011 Nepal census.

On March 10, 2017, the Government of Nepal restructured the local level bodies into 753 new local level structures. The previous Khahare Pangu, Sikhar Ambote, Mahadevtar, Shishakhani, Sipali Chilaune Katunje Besi, Kharpachok, Mangaltar, Walting and Bhimkhori VDCs were merged to form Roshi Rural Municipality. Roshi is divided into 12 wards, with Katunje Besi declared the administrative center of the rural municipality.

== Demographics ==
At the time of the 2011 Nepal census, Roshi Rural Municipality had a population of 28,760. Of these, 59.1% spoke Tamang, 32.4% Nepali, 4.6% Magar, 3.4% Newar, 0.1% Maithili and 0.1% other languages as their first language.

In terms of ethnicity/caste, 59.4% were Tamang, 12.9% Magar, 6.4% Chhetri, 5.3% Hill Brahmin, 4.6% Newar, 4.3% Thakuri, 3.3% Kami, 0.9% other Dalit, 0.9% Gharti/Bhujel, 0.7% Damai/Dholi, 0.3% Sanyasi/Dasnami, 0.3% Sarki, 0.2% Hayu, 0.1% Badi, 0.1% Limbu, 0.1% Pahari, 0.1% Tharu and 0.2% others.

In terms of literacy, 64.2% could read and write, 3.0% could only read and 32.6% could neither read nor write.
