= Mandandeupur =

Municipality in Kavrepalanchok District of Nepal

Mandandeupur मण्डनदेउपुर नगरपालिका
- Municipality
- Interactive map of Mandandeupur
- Country: Nepal
- Province: Bagmati Province
- District: Kavrepalanchok District
- Established: 10 March 2017

Government
  - Mayor: Tok Bahadur Waiba
  - Deputy Mayor: Vishnupani Nepal

Area
  - Total: 89.0 km^{2} (34.4 sq mi)

Population (2021)
  - Total: 30,381
  - Density: 341/km^{2} (880/sq mi)
- Time zone: UTC+5:45 (NST)
- Website: mandandeupurmun.gov.np

Mandandeupur (Nepali: मण्डनदेउपुर) is a municipality in Kavrepalanchok District of Bagmati Province of Nepal. It was established in 2017 by merging seven former village development committees: Baluwapati Deupur, Gairibisauna Deupur, Nayagaun Deupur, Mahadevsthan Mandan, Chandeni Mandan, Jaisithok Mandan, and Jyamdi Mandan.

== Demographics ==
According to the 2021 Nepal census, the municipality has a total population of 30,381 living in 7,924 households. The population consists of 14,853 (48.9%) males and 15,528 (51.1%) females. The average household size is 3.83 persons. The literacy rate for the municipality stands at 72.64%, with male literacy at 81.71% and female literacy at 64.05%.

At the time of the 2011 Nepal census, the population was 32,768. The primary languages spoken were Nepali (61.4%), Tamang (27.2%), Danuwar (5.1%), and Newar (4.9%). In terms of religion, 69.7% were Hindu, 26.6% Buddhist, 1.7% Prakriti, and 1.6% Christian.

== Healthcare and Public Health ==
Mandandeupur became the first local level (municipality) in Nepal to declare all of its community and institutional schools as "fully vaccinated." In alignment with the National Full Vaccination Guidelines, the municipality successfully verified that all children under 59 months of age enrolled across its schools had received their comprehensive schedule of national vaccinations. Following the individual declarations of the involved schools, Mandandeupur was officially declared a completely vaccinated municipality. This milestone is recognized for its contribution to local child health safety, the strengthening of regular immunization services, and the long-term sustainability of public vaccination programs in the region.

== Geography ==
Mandandeupur is situated in the central hills of Nepal, characterized by diverse topographical features ranging from river basins to high-altitude ridges. The municipality is bordered by the Indravati River to the east, which serves as a vital water source for the lower-lying agricultural plains.

The elevation within the municipality varies significantly, creating distinct microclimates suitable for different crops. The lower regions (Beshis) focus on rice and wheat, while the higher elevations are utilized for the "Four Betters" high-altitude farming initiatives and coffee plantations.

== Economy ==
The economy of Mandandeupur is predominantly agrarian, focused on subsistence farming and increasingly on commercial agriculture. The municipality operates under the slogan "Deupur and Mandan – Agriculture and Tourism," highlighting its primary economic pillars. The municipality is a significant regional producer of:

- Coffee: The region is recognized for high-quality Himalayan coffee beans. Kavrepalanchok is a major coffee-producing district, and Mandandeupur hosts several coffee-producing cooperatives that focus on organic production for international markets.
- Dairy: Mandandeupur is a leader in milk production within the district. In 2022, 24 cooperatives in the municipality received significant government subsidies for producing over 4.7 million litres of milk annually.
- Commercial Agriculture: In 2025, the Food and Agriculture Organization (FAO) launched Nepal's first "Four Betters Model Village" in Mandandeupur to improve agricultural productivity and food security through technological innovation.

== International relations ==
Mandandeupur maintains formal international partnerships and aligns its local governance with the Food and Agriculture Organization (FAO) "Four Betters" framework to promote global exchange in agriculture and sustainable mountain tourism.

=== Global Strategic Framework ===
In January 2025, Mandandeupur was selected as the site for Nepal's first "Four Betters Model Village" in collaboration with the FAO and the Ministry of Agriculture and Livestock Development. The municipality utilizes this framework to categorize its international development projects:

- Better Production: Modernizing agricultural productivity through the construction of solar-powered irrigation systems and high-altitude farming technology.
- Better Nutrition: Establishing school nutritional gardens and promoting organic certification for local produce.
- Better Environment: Implementing climate-resilient farming techniques and preserving traditional mountain ecosystems.
- Better Life: Promoting agritourism through homestays in Gurung communities and empowering women and youth in the agri-food system.

=== Sister cities ===
Mandandeupur maintains formal "Mountain-to-Mountain" partnership agreements with international cities sharing similar geographic and economic characteristics:

- Fujinomiya, Japan (established 23 March 2025)

The agreement was signed by Mayor Tok Bahadur Waiba and Fujinomiya Mayor Hidetada Sudo during a special session of the municipal assembly. The partnership focuses on the exchange of high-altitude farming technology and sustainable tourism management, effectively linking the volcanic agricultural techniques of the Mount Fuji region with the traditional terrace farming of the Himalayas.
