= Temal Rural Municipality =

Temal: तेमाल (Nepali); Timal, Teemal
- Rural Municipality
- Temal Rural Municipality
- Location Temal (Nepal)
- Coordinates: 27.52°N 85.74°E
- Country: Nepal
- Province: Bagmati
- District: Kavrepalanchowk
- Wards: 9
- Established: 10 March 2017

Government
  - Type: Mayor–council government
  - Chairperson: Mr. Chandra Bahadur Tamang
  - Vice-chairperson: Mr. Dal Man Thokar

Area
  - Total: 88.85 km^{2} (34.31 sq mi)

Population (2021)
  - Total: 16,957
  - Density: 190.8/km^{2} (494.3/sq mi)
- Time zone: UTC+5:45 (Nepal Standard Time)
- Post code: 45203
- Area code: 011
- Headquarter: Pokhari Narayansthan
- Website: temalmun.gov.np

Temal (Nepali: तेमाल) is a Rural municipality located within the Kavrepalanchowk District of the Bagmati Province of Nepal. The municipality spans 88.85 square kilometres (34.31 sq mi) of area, with a total population of 16,957 according to a 2021 Nepal census.

On March 10, 2017, the Government of Nepal restructured the local level bodies into 753 new local level structures. The previous Sarasyunkhark, Saramthali, Bolde Fediche, Pokhari Narayansthan, Thulo Parsel, Kuruwas Chapakhori and Milche VDCs were merged to form Temal Rural Municipality. Temal is divided into 9 wards, with Pokhari Narayansthan declared the administrative center of the rural municipality.

== Touristic activities ==
The historical temple of Narayansthan (the temple of lord Narayan) stands in Pokhrinarayansthan village, Within its premises, you'll find the Boudhanath, Swayambhu, and Namobuddha. Tongsum Kunda and the temple of Santaneshwar Mahadev at Kuruwas Chapakhori are also significant religious sites, drawing pilgrims seeking spiritual abundance.

Similarly, Bhim Paila, situated on the banks of the Sunkoshi River in Ward No. 4 Bolde under Temal Municipality, and Gaukhuru in Ward No. 6 Thuloparsel Bhorjyang, are endangered mythological sites. From the highlands of Temal, one can behold the majestic mountain ranges stretching from Kangchenjunga to Dhaulagiri, creating undulating waves of natural beauty. Additionally, the panoramic views from Temal hill encompass the Kathmandu Valley and the historic Sindhuli fort.

== Demographics ==
At the time of the 2011 Nepal census, Temal Rural Municipality had a population of 22,712. Of these, 73.1% spoke Tamang, 21.6% Nepali, 3.5% Newar, 0.9% Magar, 0.7% Majhi, 0.1% Maithili and 0.1% other languages as their first language.

In terms of ethnicity/caste, 73.1% were Tamang, 7.3% Hill Brahmin, 5.7% Magar, 4.2% Chhetri, 3.7% Newar, 2.6% Kami, 1.4% Damai/Dholi, 0.8% Majhi, 0.6% Thakuri, 0.1% Gharti/Bhujel, 0.1% Sonar and 0.3% others.

In terms of religion, 73.9% were Buddhist, 25.3% Hindu, 0.3% Prakriti, 0.2% Christian and 0.4% others.

In terms of literacy, 64.3% could read, 2.7% could only read and 32.9% could neither read nor write.
