= Mahabharat Rural Municipality =

Mahabharat (RM) महाभारत गाउँपालिका
- Rural Municipality
- Location Mahabharat (RM) (Nepal)
- Coordinates: 27.36°N 85.66°E
- Country: Nepal
- Province: Bagmati
- District: Kavrepalanchowk
- Wards: 8
- Established: 10 March 2017

Government
  - Type: Rural Council
  - Chairperson: Mr. Kancha Lal Jimba
  - Vice-chairperson: Mrs. Chet Kumar Manjhi

Area
  - Total: 186 km^{2} (72 sq mi)

Population (2011)
  - Total: 18,283
  - Density: 98.3/km^{2} (255/sq mi)
- Time zone: UTC+5:45 (Nepal Standard Time)
- Headquarter: Banakhu Chor
- Website: mahabharatmun.gov.np

Mahabharat is a Rural municipality located within the Kavrepalanchowk District of the Bagmati Province of Nepal. The municipality spans 186 square kilometres (72 sq mi) of area, with a total population of 18,283 according to a 2011 Nepal census.

On March 10, 2017, the Government of Nepal restructured the local level bodies into 753 new local level structures. The previous Gokule, Phoksingtar, Budhakhani, Banakhu Chor and Ghartichhap VDCs were merged to form Mahabharat Rural Municipality. Mahabharat is divided into 8 wards, with Banakhu Chor declared the administrative center of the rural municipality.

== Demographics ==
At the time of the 2011 Nepal census, Mahabharat Rural Municipality had a population of 18,283. Of these, 69.6% spoke Tamang, 15.1% Magar, 13.9% Nepali, 1.0% Newar, 0.1% Bhojpuri, 0.1% Maithili and 0.1% other languages as their first language.

In terms of caste/ethnicity, 69.9% were Tamang, 21.2% Magar, 2.7% Kami, 2.6% Newar, 1.1% Chhetri, 1.0% Majhi, 0.5% Hill Brahmin, 0.4% Sarki, 0.1% Damai/Dholi, 0.1% Pahari, and 0.2% others.

In terms of religion, 73.6% were Buddhist, 25.2% Hindu, 0.9% Christian, 0.1% Prakriti and 0.2% others.

In terms of literacy, 57.4% could read and write, 7.8% could only read and 34.7% could neither read nor write.
