= Pangu (disambiguation) =

Pangu is the creator god in Chinese mythology.

Pangu may also refer to:

- Pangu, Nepal, village in Nepal
- Pangu utility, computer graphics utility
- Pangu Team, an iOS jailbreaking team
- Pangu Party, a political party in Papua New Guinea
- Pongu language or Pangu language, Kainji language spoken in Nigeria
- Huawei PanGu, multimodal large language model developed by Huawei

== Places in China ==
- Pangu Township, Fujian (盘谷乡), subdivision of Yongtai County, Fujian
- Pangu, Hebei (盘古镇), subdivision of Qing County, Hebei
- Pangu, Heilongjiang (盘古镇; zh), town in and subdivision of Tahe County, Heilongjiang
- Pangu Township, Henan (盘古乡), subdivision of Biyang County, Henan
- Pangu Township, Hunan (盘古乡), subdivision of Yuanling County, Hunan
- Pangu, Jiangxi (盘谷镇), town in and subdivision of Jishui County, Jiangxi
- Pangu Plaza in Chaoyang District, Beijing

== See also ==
- Ban Gu, Chinese historian
- Pingu
