= Bethanchok Rural Municipality =

Bethanchok (RM) बेथानचोक गाउँपालिका
- Rural Municipality
- Location Bethanchok (RM) (Nepal)
- Coordinates: 27°51′N 85°48′E
- Country: Nepal
- Province: Bagmati
- District: Kavrepalanchowk
- Wards: 6
- Established: 10 March 2017
- Included (VDC): Chyamrangbesi; Dhungkharka; Chalal Ganeshsthan; Chyasing Kharka; Bhugdeu, Mahankal

Government
  - Type: Rural Council
  - President: Bhagawan Adhikari NC
  - Vice-President: Tara Rana Timalsina Nepali Communist Party

Area
  - Total: 101.02 km^{2} (39.00 sq mi)
- Elevation: 300 m (980 ft)

Population (2021)
  - Total: 14,996
  - Density: 148.45/km^{2} (384.47/sq mi)
- Time zone: UTC+5:45 (Nepal Standard Time)
- Headquarter: Dhungakharka
- Website: https://bethanchowkmun.gov.np/

Bethanchok is a Rural municipality located within the Kavrepalanchowk District of the Bagmati Province of Nepal. The municipality spans 101 square kilometres (39 sq mi) of area, with a total population of 16,777 according to a 2011 Nepal census.

On March 10, 2017, the Government of Nepal restructured the local level bodies into 753 new local level structures. The previous Chyamrangbesi, Dhungakharka, Chalal Ganeshsthan, Chyasing Kharka and Bhugdeu Mahankal VDCs were merged to form Bethanchok Rural Municipality. Bethanchok is divided into 6 wards, with Dhungakharka declared the administrative center of the rural municipality.

== Demographics ==
At the time of the 2021 Nepal census, Bethanchok Rural Municipality had a population of 14,996. Of these, 52.5% spoke Tamang, 43.7% Nepali, 2.5% Newar, 1.1% Magar and 0.1% other languages as their first language.

Languages In Bethanchowk
Languages	Percent
Tamang	52.5%
Nepali	43.7%
Newari	2.5%
Magar	1.1%
Others	0.1%

In terms of ethnicity/caste, 52.9% were Tamang, 24.9% Hill Brahmin, 7.8% Chhetri, 7.0% Newar, 3.3% Magar, 2.3% Kami, 0.9% Damai/Dholi, 0.4% Gharti/Bhujel, 0.1% Sanyasi/Dasnami, 0.1% Thakuri and 0.2% others.

Ethnicities & Caste In Bethanchowk
Ethnicities	Percent
Tamang	52.9%
Hill Brahmin	24.9%
Chhetri	7.8%
Newar	7.0%
Magar	3.3%
Kami	2.3%
Others	1.8%

In terms of religion, 52.7% were Buddhist, 46.2% Hindu, 0.8% Christian and 0.3% others.

Religion In Bethanchowk
Religion	Percent
Buddhism	52.7%
Hinduism	46.2%
Christianity	0.8%
Others	0.3%

In terms of literacy, 67.5% could read and write, 2.4% could only read and 30.0% could neither read nor write.
