= Khanikhola Rural Municipality =

Khanikhola (RM) खानीखोला गाउँपालिका
- Rural Municipality
- Location Khanikhola (RM) (Nepal)
- Coordinates: 27°22′59″N 85°29′59″E
- Country: Nepal
- Province: Bagmati
- District: Kavrepalanchowk
- Wards: 7
- Established: 10 March 2017

Government
  - Type: Rural Council
  - Chairperson: Mr. Krishna Bahadur Khulal
  - Vice-chairperson: Mrs. Rukmeni Gurung

Area
  - Total: 132 km^{2} (51 sq mi)

Population (2011)
  - Total: 14,398
  - Density: 109/km^{2} (283/sq mi)
- Time zone: UTC+5:45 (Nepal Standard Time)
- Headquarter: Salmechakala
- Website: khanikholamun.gov.np

Khanikhola is a Rural municipality located within the Kavrepalanchowk District of the Bagmati Province of Nepal. The municipality spans 132 square kilometres (51 sq mi) of area, with a total population of 14,398 according to a 2011 Nepal census.

On March 10, 2017, the Government of Nepal restructured the local level bodies into 753 new local level structures. The previous Phalametar, Dandagaun, Salmechakala, Saldhara and Milche VDCs were merged to form Khanikhola Rural Municipality. Khanikhola is divided into 7 wards, with Salmechakala declared the administrative center of the rural municipality.

== Demographics ==
At the time of the 2011 Nepal census, Khanikhola Rural Municipality had a population of 14,398. Of these, 79.8% spoke Tamang, 17.1% Nepali, 2.6% Magar, 0.2% Newar and 0.3% other languages as their first language.

In terms of ethnicity/caste, 80.2% were Tamang, 7.6% Magar, 4.7% Chhetri, 2.9% Hill Brahmin, 1.3% Kami, 1.0% Majhi, 0.8% Pahari, 0.5% Gurung, 0.4% Damai/Dholi, 0.3% Newar, 0.1% other Dalit, 0.1% Ghale and 0.2% others.

In terms of religion, 84.4% were Buddhist, 14.0% Hindu, 1.0% Prakriti, 0.3% Christian and 0.3% others.

In terms of literacy, 60.3% could read and write, 4.3% could only read and 35.4% could neither read nor write.
