= Mahankal Chaur =

Mahankal Chaur महांकाल चौर Bhugudeu
- Village development committee
- Nickname: Bhugudeu
- Location in Nepal
- Coordinates: 27.51°N 85.55°E
- Country: Nepal
- Zone: Bagmati Zone
- District: Kabhrepalanchok District

Population (1991)
  - Total: 3,954
- Time zone: UTC+5:45 (Nepal Time)

Mahankal Chaur is a village development committee in Kabhrepalanchok District in the Bagmati Zone of central Nepal. At the time of the 1991 Nepal census, it had a population of 3,954.
