= Pangu, Nepal =

Coordinates: 27°31′N 85°35′E

Pangu, Nepal पाँगु
- Village
- Interactive map of Pangu, Nepal
- Country: Nepal
- Zone: Bagmati Zone
- District: Kabhrepalanchok District

Population (1991)
  - Total: 2,845
- Time zone: UTC+5:45 (Nepal Time)

Pangu is a village in Khahare Pangu VDC, Kabhrepalanchok District in the Bagmati Zone of central Nepal. At the time of the 1991 Nepal census it had a population of 2845 in 480 individual households.
