= Mahadevsthan Mandan =

Mahadevsthan Mandan महादेवस्थानमण्डन
- Village development committee
- Location in Nepal
- Coordinates: 27.72°N 85.62°E
- Country: Nepal
- Zone: Bagmati Zone
- District: Kabhrepalanchok District

Population (1991)
  - Total: 6,892
- Time zone: UTC+5:45 (Nepal Time)

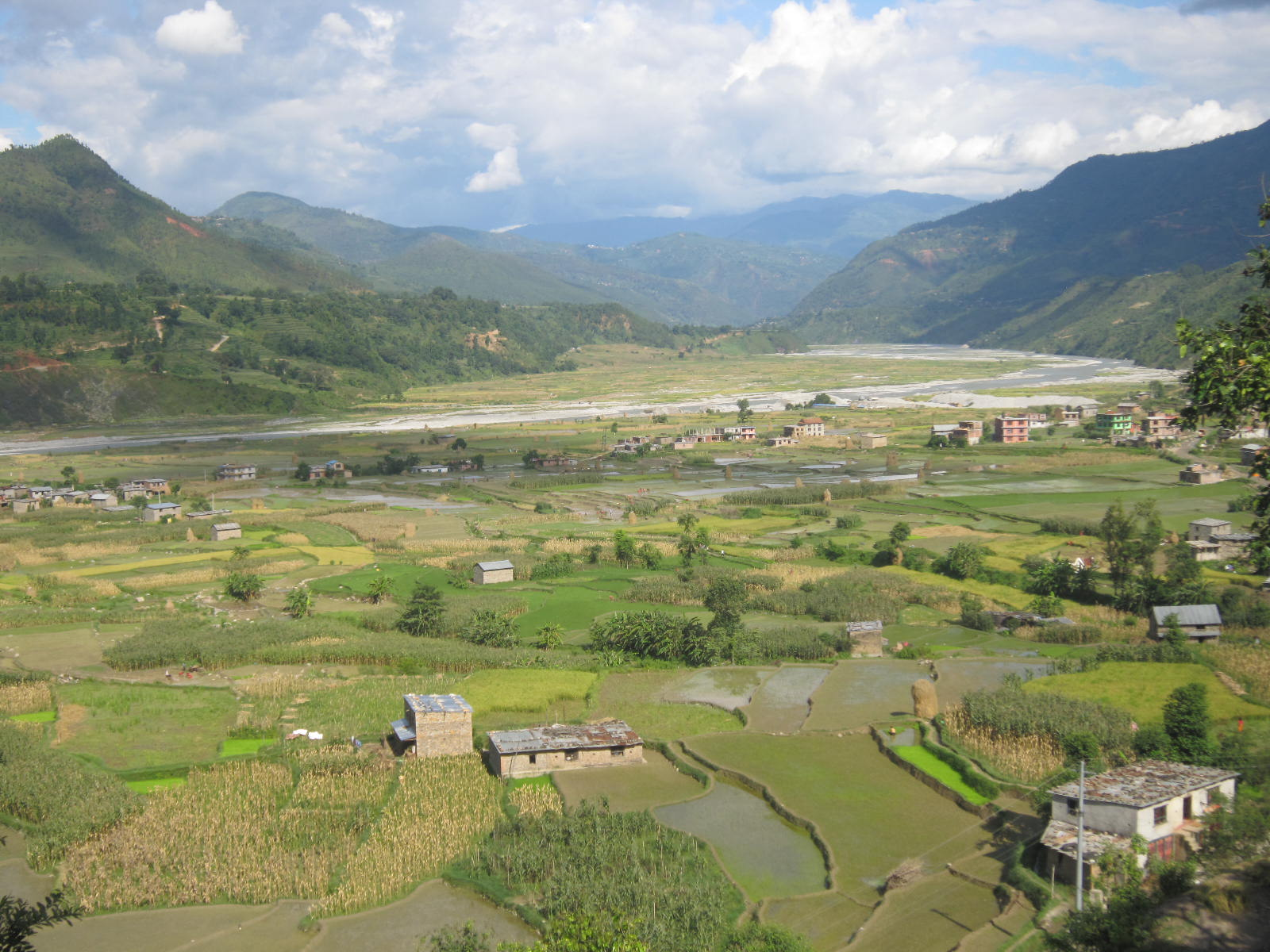

Mahadevsthan Mandan is a village development committee in Kavrepalanchok District in the Bagmati Zone of central Nepal.

== Demographics ==
At the time of the 1991 Nepal census it had a population of 6,892 in 1,216 individual households.

== Geography ==
Mahadevsthan Ward No. 4 is the passway for Helambu and supports trekking. Melamchi and Gosaikund are places of religious importance.

It is part of Mandandeupur municipality and number 3 out of 7 provinces in Nepal. It includes wards 7, 8 and 9.

== Governance ==
In 2017, Mahadevsthan Mandan was merged into Mandandeupur Municipality.
