= Gerkhu =

Gerkhu may refer to:

- Gerkhu, Dhading
- Gerkhu, Nuwakot
