= Kanpur Kalapani =

Village development committee in Bagmati Zone, Nepal

Kanpur Kalapani कानपुर कालापानी Kalimati view Tower
- Namobuddha municipality ward no 5
- Location in Nepal
- Coordinates: 27.55°N 85.70°E
- Country: Nepal
- Zone: Bagmati Zone
- District: Kabhrepalanchok District

Population (2021)
  - Total: 26,160
- Time zone: UTC+5:45 (Nepal Time)

Kanpur Kalapani is Namobuddha municipality ward no 5 in Kabhrepalanchok District in the Bagmati Zone of central Nepal. At the time of the 2021 Nepal census it had a population of 26,160 in 710 individual households in Namobuddha municipality ward no 5. It occupies 102.4 square kilometres. The highest altitude is 2100m. Unique mountain range of Manasalu, Gaurishankar, Mt. Shishapangma, Dorje lakpa, Ganesh Himal, Langtang Lirung, Chova bamre, Jugal Himal, Numbur peak, Gyaljen peak, Mt. Everest range.
