= Machchhegaun =

Village development committee in Bagmati Zone, Nepal

Machchhegaun मच्छेगाउँ
- Village development committee
- Location in Nepal
- Coordinates: 27.47°N 85.79°E
- Country: Nepal
- Zone: Bagmati Zone
- District: Kavrepalanchok District

Population (1991)
  - Total: 5,951
- Time zone: UTC+5:45 (Nepal Time)

Machchhegaun is a town and municipality in Kavrepalanchok District in the Bagmati Zone of central Nepal. At the time of the 1991 Nepal census it had a population of 5,951 in 979 individual households.
