= Kuruwas Chapakhori =

Village development committee in Bagmati Zone, Nepal

Kuruwas Chapakhori कुरुवास चापाखोरी
- Village development committee
- Location in Nepal
- Coordinates: 27.50°N 85.76°E
- Country: Nepal
- Zone: Bagmati Zone
- District: Kavrepalanchok District

Population (1991)
  - Total: 2,684
- Time zone: UTC+5:45 (Nepal Time)

Kuruwas Chapakhori is a village development committee in Kavrepalanchok District in the Bagmati Zone of central Nepal. At the time of the 1991 Nepal census it had a population of 2,684 in 459 individual households.
