= Kharpachok =

Kharpachok खार्पाचोक
- Village development committee
- Location in Nepal
- Coordinates: 27.49°N 85.69°E
- Country: Nepal
- Zone: Bagmati Zone
- District: Kabhrepalanchok District

Population (1991)
  - Total: 1,393
- Time zone: UTC+5:45 (Nepal Time)

Kharpachok is a village development committee in Kabhrepalanchok District in the Bagmati Zone of central Nepal. At the time of the 1991 Nepal census it had a population of 1,393 in 234 individual households.
