= Sanowangthali =

Sanowangthali सानोवाङथली
- Village development committee
- Location in Nepal
- Coordinates: 27.63°N 85.82°E
- Country: Nepal
- Zone: Bagmati Zone
- District: Kabhrepalanchok District

Population (1991)
  - Total: 2,033
- Time zone: UTC+5:45 (Nepal Time)

Sanowangthali is a village development committee in Kabhrepalanchok District in the Bagmati Zone of central Nepal. At the time of the 1991 Nepal census it had a population of 2,033 .
