= Sikhar Ambote =

Village development committee in Bagmati Zone, Nepal

Shikhar Ambote शिखर आम्बोटे
- Village development committee
- Location in Nepal
- Coordinates: 27.49°N 85.60°E
- Country: Nepal
- Zone: Bagmati Zone
- District: Kavrepalanchok District

Population (1991)
  - Total: 3,995
- Time zone: UTC+5:45 (Nepal Time)

Shikhar Ambote is a village development committee (VDC) in Kavrepalanchok District in the Bagmati Zone of central Nepal. At the center of village is a public school named Shree Devi Secondary School. At least 700 students from different parts of the village receive basic education. At the time of the 1991 Nepal census, the village had a population of 3,995 in 702 individual households.
