= Bikateswor Temple =

Temple in Bagmati, Nepal

Bikateshwor temple is the holy place of Lord Shiva. It is located in Nasiksthan Sanga, part of Banepa Municipality in Kabhrepalanchok District in the Bagmati Zone of central Nepal. The temple is a main pilgrimage centre for Hindu pilgrims. The Punyamata river (tribute of Roshi River) flows through this temple.

== History ==
The temple is described in Swasthani and the Skanda Purana.

== Events ==
- Shivaratri, the main festival of lord Shiva.
- Bol Bom in the month of shrawan.
- Kanya Pooja
