= Daraune Pokhari =

Daraune Pokhari डराउने पोखरी
- Village development committee
- Location in Nepal
- Coordinates: 27.53°N 85.61°E
- Country: Nepal
- Province: Bagmati Province
- District: Kabhrepalanchok District

Population (1991)
  - Total: 3,138
- Time zone: UTC+5:45 (Nepal Time)

Daraune Pokhari is a village development committee in Kabhrepalanchok District in Bagmati Province of central Nepal. At the time of the 1991 Nepal census it had a population of 3,138 and had 575 houses in it.
