= Rajan Kharel =

- राजन खरेल
- Born: Kavrepalanchok, Nepal
- Occupation: cinematographer
- Years active: Current

Rajan Kharel (Nepali: राजन खरेल) is a Nepalese cinematographer, editor, and visual storyteller in Nepali film, music and advertising.

Born in the Kavrepalanchok district of Nepal, Kharel has worked as a cinematographer in Nepali feature films such as Durgamandau, Kuineto, and Chitthi. He was awarded the Best Cinematographer Award for the documentary Journey to Gokyo at the Nepal-Africa Film Festival, the Everest Honor Award for Best Cinematographer (Film) in 2019 for Durgamandu, the MSN Excellency Award for Best Cinematographer (Music Video) in 2021 for Hamro Sajha Himal, and the Spiny Babbler International Film Festival Award for Best Cinematographer (Documentary) in 2023 for Khahare Pangu. The music video for Hamro Sajha Himal, filmed at a high-altitude location, was recognized for setting a world record in 2019, with Kharel credited as the cinematographer.

== Filmography ==
SN	Film title	Release year	Ref
1	Kuineto	2015	
2	Durgamandu	2018	
3	Chitthi	2022	
4	Mrityu Kosh	2024	

== Awards ==
SN	Award Title	Award Category	Result	Ref
1	Everest Honor Award– 2019(Mt. Everest)			
2	MSN Excellency Award – 2021(Dubai)			
3	3rd Spiny Babbler International Film Festival - 2023(Nepal)	Best Cinematographer	won	
4	12th Nepal Africa Film Festival – 2024 (Nepal)	Best Cinematographer	won	
