= Maladera bagmatiensis =

Scientific classification
- Kingdom: Animalia
- Phylum: Arthropoda
- Class: Insecta
- Order: Coleoptera
- Suborder: Polyphaga
- Infraorder: Scarabaeiformia
- Family: Scarabaeidae
- Genus: Maladera
- Species: M. bagmatiensis

Binomial name
- Maladera bagmatiensis Ahrens, 2004

Species of beetle

Maladera bagmatiensis is a species of beetle of the family Scarabaeidae. It is found in India (Sikkim) and Nepal.

== Description ==
Adults reach a length of about 7.3–8.7 mm. They have a reddish-brown, oval body. The upper surface is mostly dull and glabrous, except for the lateral cilia of the pronotum and elytra.

== Etymology ==
The species is named after its type locality in the Bagmati Zone.
