= Saramthali =

Saramthali may refer to:

- Saramthali, Kavrepalanchok, Nepal
- Saramthali, Rasuwa, Nepal
