= Nagre Gagarche =

Nagre Gagarche नाग्रे गगर्चे
- Village development committee
- Location in Nepal
- Coordinates: 27.61°N 85.86°E
- Country: Nepal
- Zone: Bagmati Zone
- District: Kavre palanchok District

Population (1991)
  - Total: 2,235
- Time zone: UTC+5:45 (Nepal Time)

Nagre Gagarche is a village development committee in Kabhrepalanchok District in the Bagmati Zone of central Nepal. At the time of the 1991 Nepal census it had a population of 2,235 in 423 individual households.
