= Nasiksthan Sanga =

Nasiksthan Sanga नासिकास्थान साँगा Hindu Temple Nasikasthan, Shiva mandir
- (Nepal)Banepa municipality
- Nickname: बनेपा नगरपालिका,१३,१४
- Location in Nepal
- Coordinates: 27.635°N 85.482°E
- Country: Nepal
- Zone: Bagmati Zone
- District: Kabhrepalanchok District

Population (2011)
  - Total: 6,121
- Time zone: UTC+5:45 (Nepal Time)
- Postal code: 45210
- Area code: 011

Nasiksthan Sanga is a part of Banepa Municipality in Kabhrepalanchok District in the Bagmati Zone of central Nepal. It is situated at the height of 1480m from sea level. Araniko Highway connects Sanga with the capital and is considered one of the major checkpoints to valley. At the time of the 2011 Nepal census it had a population of 6,121 in 1,305 individual households. It is also the border between Bhaktapur and Kavrepalanchowk Districts.

People here produce the famous Lapsi (Hug Plum) Candy or "Titaura" which is the main business in Sanga.

== Place of attraction ==
- Nasikasthan temple
- Bikateswor temple
- Ashapureswor temple
- Kailashnath temple
- Lateramshower temple
