= Methinkot =

Methinkot मेथिनकाट
- Village development committee
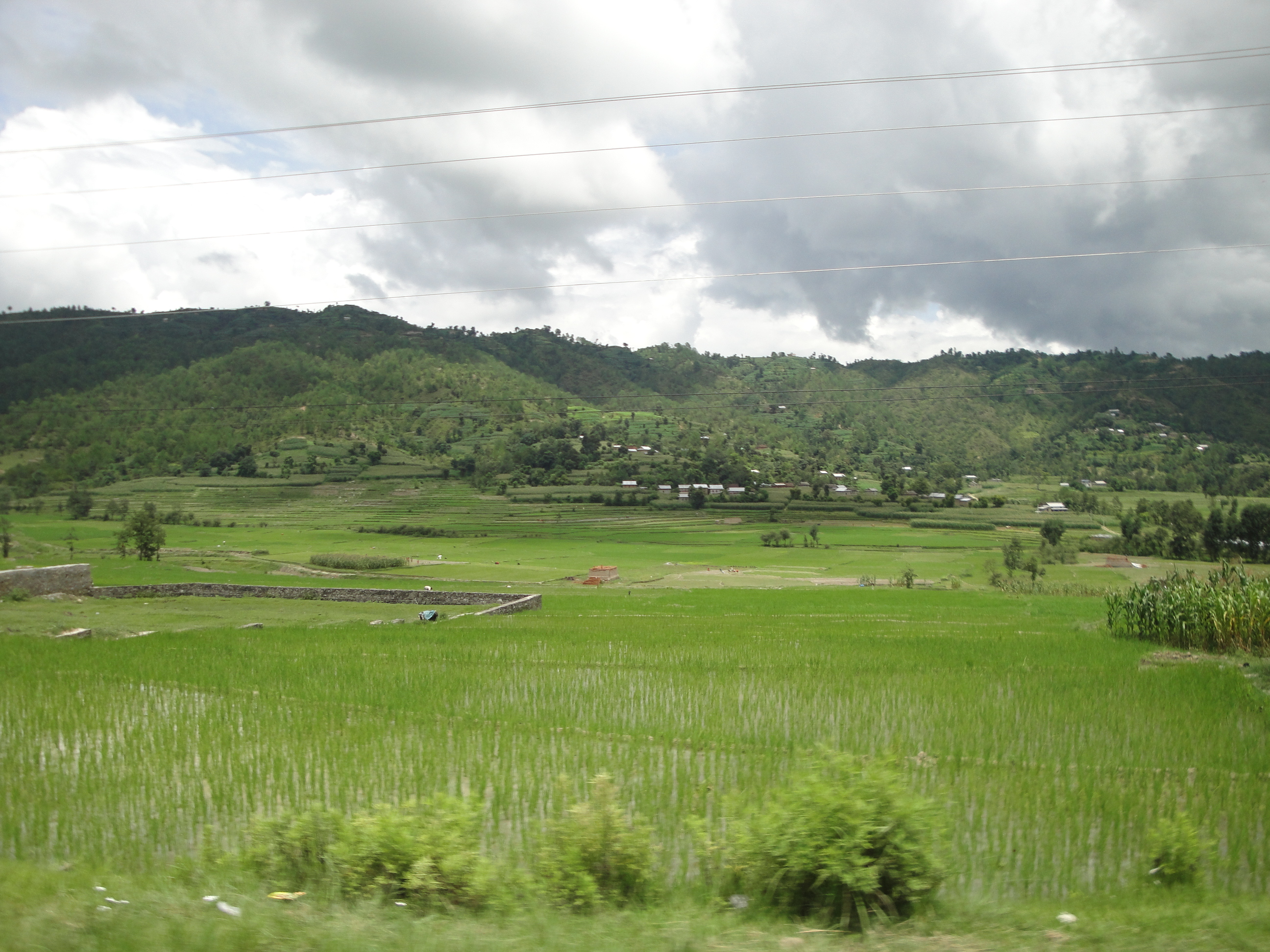

- Location in Nepal
- Coordinates: 27.57°N 85.67°E
- Country: Nepal
- Zone: Bagmati Zone
- District: Kabhrepalanchok District
- Established: Kaflethok, Bhindabari, Charuwa and well as other areas

Government

Population (1991)
  - Total: 3,909
- Time zone: UTC+5:45 (Nepal Time)

Methinkot is a village development committee in Kabhrepalanchok District in the Bagmati Zone of central Nepal. At the time of the 1991 Nepal census it had a population of 3,909 in 724 individual households.

This VDC has a diversified population: Brahmins, Chhetris, Tamang, Bishwokarma, Pariyar, gharti etc.
