= Katunje Besi =

Katunje Besi कटुञ्जे बेंसी
- Village development committee
- Location in Nepal
- Coordinates: 27.52°N 85.69°E
- Country: Nepal
- Zone: Bagmati Zone
- District: Kabhrepalanchok District

Population (1991)
  - Total: 1,986
- Time zone: UTC+5:45 (Nepal Time)

Katunje Besi is a village development committee in Kabhrepalanchok District in the Bagmati Zone of central Nepal. At the time of the 1991 Nepal census it had a population of 1,986 in 359 individual households.
