= Bekhsimle =

Bekhsimle बेखसिम्ले
- Village development committee
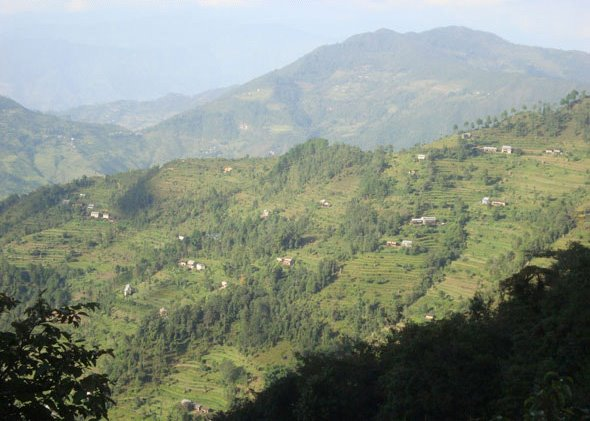

- Location in Nepal
- Coordinates: 27.66°N 85.81°E
- Country: Nepal
- Province: Bagmati Province
- District: Kabhrepalanchok District

Population (1991)
  - Total: 1,210
- Time zone: UTC+5:45 (Nepal Time)

Bekhsimle is a village development committee in Kabhrepalanchok District, Bagmati Province, Nepal. At the time of the 1991 Nepal census it had a population of 1,210 and had 228 houses in it.

== Gallery ==
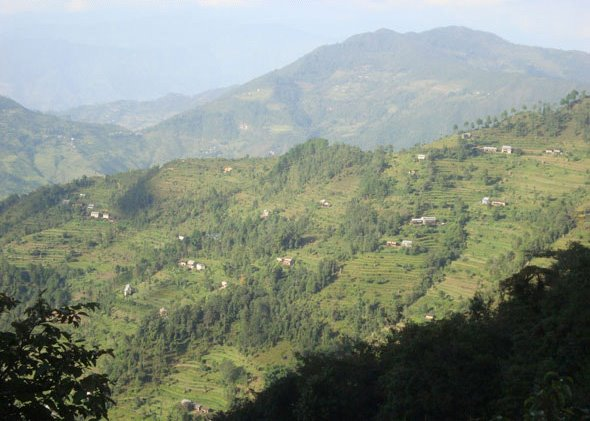
Bekhsimle, Kavre
