= Walting =

Walting may refer to:

- Walting, Eichstätt, Germany
- Walting, Kavrepalanchok, Nepal
