= Patalekhet =

Pātālekhet पातालेखेत/पात्लेखेत Pātlekhet
- Village development committee
- Location in Nepal
- Coordinates: 27.60°N 85.60°E
- Country: Nepal
- Zone: Bagmati Zone
- District: Kavrepalanchok District

Population (1991)
  - Total: 3,516
- Time zone: UTC+5:45 (Nepal Time)

Pātālekhet (Newar: पातालेखेत; Nepali: पात्लेखेत, Pātlekhet) is a village development committee in Kavrepalanchok District in the Bagmati Zone of central Nepal. At the time of the 1991 Nepal census it had a population of 3,516 in 621 individual households.
