= Kolati Bhumlu =

Kolati Bhumlu कोलाँतीभुम्लु
- Village development committee
- Location in Nepal
- Coordinates: 27.59°N 85.74°E
- Country: Nepal
- Zone: Bagmati Zone
- District: Kabhrepalanchok District

Population (1991)
  - Total: 1,455
- Time zone: UTC+5:45 (Nepal Time)

Kolati Bhumlu is a village development committee in Kabhrepalanchok District in the Bagmati Zone of central Nepal. At the time of the 1991 Nepal census it had a population of 1,455 in 282 individual households.
