= Phulping Katti =

Phulping Katti फुल्पिङ कट्टी
- Village development committee
- Location in Nepal
- Coordinates: 27.878°N 85.981°E
- Country: Nepal
- Zone: Bagmati Zone
- District: Sindhupalchok District

Population (1991)
  - Total: 3,118
  - Religions: [buddhist
- Time zone: UTC+5:45 (Nepal Time)

Phulping Katti is a village in Sindhupalchok District in the Bagmati Zone of central Nepal. At the time of the 1991 Nepal census it had a population of 3118 and had 614 houses in the village.
