= Pokhari Chauri =

Pokhari Chauri पोखरी चौरी
- Village development committee
- Location in Nepal
- Coordinates: 27.57°N 85.81°E
- Country: Nepal
- Zone: Bagmati Zone
- District: Kavrepalanchok District

Population (1991)
  - Total: 3,879
- Time zone: UTC+5:45 (Nepal Time)

Pokhari Chauri is a village development committee in Kavrepalanchok District in the Bagmati Zone of central Nepal. At the time of the 1991 Nepal census it had a population of 3,879 in 609 individual households. It lies in the border of Ramechhap and kavrepalanchowk district. It is about 80 km away from the capital of Nepal, Kathmandu
