= Saldhara =

Saldhara सालधारा
- Village development committee
- Location in Nepal
- Coordinates: 27.42°N 85.47°E
- Country: Nepal
- Zone: Bagmati Zone
- District: Kabhrepalanchok District

Population (1991)
  - Total: 2,265
- Time zone: UTC+5:45 (Nepal Time)

Saldhara is a village development committee in Kabhrepalanchok District in the Bagmati Zone of central Nepal. At the time of the 1991 Nepal census it had a population of 2,265 in 392 individual households.
