= Sarasyunkhark =

Sarsyunkharka सर्स्यूंखर्क
- Village development committee
- Nickname: buddhachita
- Location in Nepal
- Coordinates: 27.56°N 85.72°E
- Country: Nepal
- Zone: Bagmati Zone
- District: Kavrepalanchok District

Population (1991)
  - Total: 4,880
- Time zone: UTC+5:45 (Nepal Time)

Sarsyukharka

Temal Municipality Ward no.1

Sarasyukharka is a village development committee in Kavrepalanchok District in the Bagmati Zone of central Nepal. At the time of the 1991 Nepal census it had a population of 4,880 in 862 individual households.
