= Mahadevtar =

Mahadevtar महादेवटार
- Village development committee
- Location in Nepal
- Coordinates: 27°35′N 84°43′E
- Country: Nepal
- Zone: Bagmati Zone
- District: Kabhrepalanchok District

Population (1991)
  - Total: 1,977
- Time zone: UTC+5:45 (Nepal Time)

Mahadevtar is a village development committee in Kabhrepalanchok District in the Bagmati Zone of central Nepal. At the time of the 1991 Nepal census it had a population of 1,977 in 298 individual households.
