= Khopasi =

Coordinates: 27°34′N 85°32′E

Khopasi खोपासी
- Village development committee
- Interactive map of Khopasi
- Country: Nepal
- Zone: Bagmati Zone
- District: Kabhrepalanchok District

Population (1991)
  - Total: 3,453
- Time zone: UTC+5:45 (Nepal Time)
- Postal code: 45216
- Area code: 011

Khopasi is a village development committee in Kabhrepalanchok District in the Bagmati Zone of central Nepal. At the time of the 1991 Nepal census it had a population of 3,453 in 676 individual households. Now at Panauti municipality
