= Nayagaun Deupur =

Nayagaun Deupur नयाँगाउँ देउपुर
- Village development committee
- Location in Nepal
- Coordinates: 27.71°N 85.57°E
- Country: Nepal
- Zone: Bagmati Zone
- District: Kabhrepalanchok District

Population (1991)
  - Total: 3,807
- Time zone: UTC+5:45 (Nepal Time)

Nayagaun Deupur is a village development committee in Kabhrepalanchok District in the Bagmati Zone of central Nepal. At the time of the 1991 Nepal census it had a population of 3,807 in 635 individual households.
