= Ghartichhap =

Ghartichhap घर्तीछाप
- Village development committee
- Location in Nepal
- Coordinates: 27.37°N 85.60°E
- Country: Nepal
- Province: Bagmati Province
- District: Kabhrepalanchok District

Population (1991)
  - Total: 2,095
- Time zone: UTC+5:45 (Nepal Time)
- Postal code: 45201
- Area code: 011

Ghartichhap is a village development committee in Kabhrepalanchok District in Bagmati Province of central Nepal. At the time of the 1991 Nepal census it had a population of 2,095 and had 308 houses in it.
