= Gerkhu, Nuwakot =

Gerkhu गेर्खु
- Village development committee
- Location in Nepal
- Coordinates: 27.96°N 85.19°E
- Country: Nepal
- Zone: Bagmati Zone
- District: Nuwakot District

Population (1991)
  - Total: 6,198
- Time zone: UTC+5:45 (Nepal Time)

Gerkhu is a village development committee in Nuwakot District in the Bagmati Zone of central Nepal. At the time of the 1991 Nepal census it had a population of 6198 living in 1114 individual households.
