= Machang, Qing County =

Machang 马厂镇
- Town
- Interactive map of Machang
- Coordinates: 38°39′19″N 116°53′30″E
- Country: People's Republic of China
- Province: Hebei
- Prefecture-level city: Cangzhou
- County: Qing
- Village-level divisions: 24 villages
- Elevation: 9 m (30 ft)
- Time zone: UTC+8 (China Standard)
- Postal code: 062650
- Area code: 0317

Machang (simplified Chinese: 马厂; traditional Chinese: 馬廠; pinyin: Mǎchǎng; lit. 'horse yard') is a town of Qing County in eastern Hebei province, China, located 4 to 5 kilometres (2.5 to 3.1 mi) south of the border with Tianjin and 10 km (6.2 mi) northeast of the county seat. As of 2011, it has 24 villages under its administration.

== See also ==
- List of township-level divisions of Hebei
