= Bhumlutar =

Bhumlutar भूम्लुटार
- Village development committee
- Location in Nepal
- Coordinates: 27.63°N 85.73°E
- Country: Nepal
- Province: Bagmati Province
- District: Kavrepalanchok District

Population (1991)
  - Total: 2,284
- Time zone: UTC+5:45 (Nepal Time)

Bhumlutar is a village development committee in Kavrepalanchok District in Bagmati Province of central Nepal. At the time of the 1991 Nepal census it had a population of 2,284 and had 414 houses in it.
