= Gairi Bisouna Deupur =

Gairi Bisouna Deupur गैरी बिसौना देवपुर
- Village development committee
- Location in Nepal
- Coordinates: 27.74°N 85.58°E
- Country: Nepal
- Province: Bagmati Province
- District: Kavrepalanchok District

Population (1991)
  - Total: 5,205
- Time zone: UTC+5:45 (Nepal Time)

Gairi Bisouna Deupur is a village development committee in Kavrepalanchok District in Bagmati Province of central Nepal. At the time of the 1991 Nepal census it had a population of 5,205 and had 928 houses in it.
