= Chyasing Kharka =

Chyasing Kharka च्यासिङ खर्क
- Village development committee
- Location in Nepal
- Coordinates: 27.53°N 85.52°E
- Country: Nepal
- Province: Bagmati Province
- District: Kabhrepalanchok District

Population (1991)
  - Total: 2,628
- Time zone: UTC+5:45 (Nepal Time)

Chyasing Kharka is a village development committee in Kabhrepalanchok District in Bagmati Province of central Nepal. At the time of the 1991 Nepal census it had a population of 2,628 and had 501 houses in it.
