= Majhi Feda =

Majhi Feda माझी फेदा
- Village development committee
- Location in Nepal
- Coordinates: 27.59°N 85.84°E
- Country: Nepal
- Zone: Bagmati Zone
- District: Kabhrepalanchok District

Population (1991)
  - Total: 3,331
- Time zone: UTC+5:45 (Nepal Time)

Majhi Feda is a village development committee in Kabhrepalanchok District in the Bagmati Zone of central Nepal. At the time of the 1991 Nepal census it had a population of 3,331 in 572 individual households.
