= Dhuseni Siwalaya =

Dhuseni Siwalaya धुसेनी शिवालय
- Village development committee
- Location in Nepal
- Coordinates: 27.59°N 85.80°E
- Country: Nepal
- Province: Bagmati Province
- District: Kabhrepalanchok District

Population (1991)
  - Total: 2,049
- Time zone: UTC+5:45 (Nepal Time)

Dhuseni Siwalaya is a village development committee in Kabhrepalanchok District in Bagmati Province of central Nepal. At the time of the 1991 Nepal census it had a population of 2,049 and had 379 houses in it.
