= Saramthali, Kavrepalanchok =

Sarmathali सर्माथली
- Village development committee
- Location in Nepal
- Coordinates: 27.54°N 85.75°E
- Country: Nepal
- Zone: Bagmati Zone
- District: Kabhrepalanchok District

Population (1991)
  - Total: 1,159
- Time zone: UTC+5:45 (Nepal Time)

Sarmathali is a village development committee in Kabhrepalanchok District in the Bagmati Zone of central Nepal. At the time of the 1991 Nepal census it had a population of 1,159 in 234 individual households.
