= Qing County =

Qing County 青县
- County
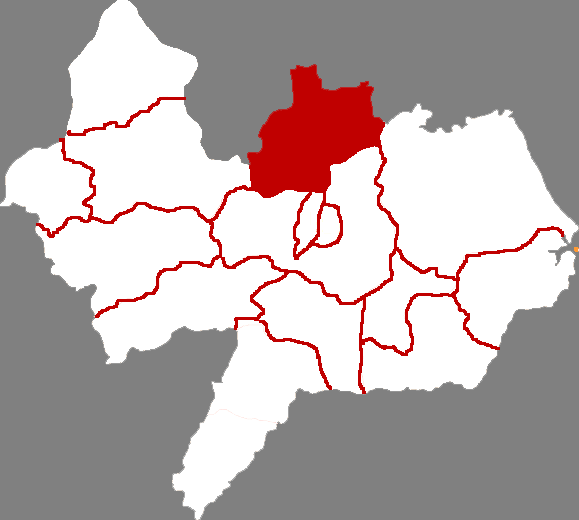
- Qing County in Cangzhou

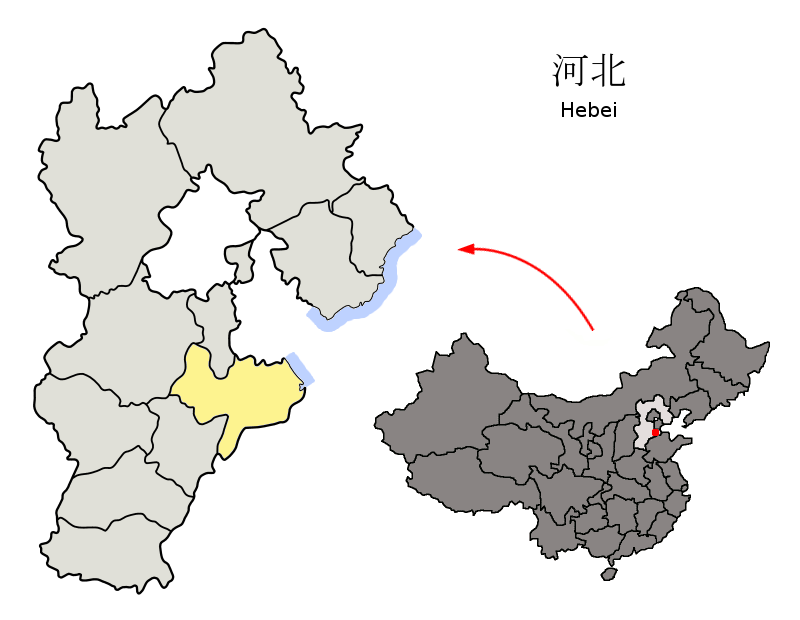
- Cangzhou in Hebei
- Coordinates: 38°34′59″N 116°48′14″E
- Country: People's Republic of China
- Province: Hebei
- Prefecture-level city: Cangzhou
- County seat: Qingzhou Town (清州镇)

Area
  - Total: 968 km^{2} (374 sq mi)
- Elevation: 9.1 m (30 ft)

Population (2020 census)
  - Total: 420,878
  - Density: 435/km^{2} (1,130/sq mi)
- Time zone: UTC+8 (China Standard)
- Postal code: 062650
- Area code: 0317

Qing County or Qingxian (simplified Chinese: 青县; traditional Chinese: 青縣; pinyin: Qīng Xiàn), is a county in the east of Hebei province, China, bordering Tianjin to the north. It is under the administration of Cangzhou prefecture-level city, with a population of 420,878 in 2020 residing in an area of 968 km^{2} (374 sq mi). G2 Beijing–Shanghai Expressway, which is concurrent with G3 Beijing–Taipei Expressway in the province, as well as China National Highway 104, pass through the county.

== Administrative divisions ==
The county administers 6 towns and 4 townships.

Towns:

- Qingzhou (清州镇), Jinniu (金牛镇), Xinxing (新兴镇), Liuhe (流河镇), Mumendian (木门店镇), Machang (马厂镇)

Townships:

- Zhouguantun Township (周官屯乡), Caosi Township (曹寺乡), Pangu Township (盘古乡), Chenzui Township (陈嘴乡)

== Climate ==
Climate data for Qingxian, elevation 8 m (26 ft), (1991–2020 normals, extremes 1981–2010)
| Month | Jan | Feb | Mar | Apr | May | Jun | Jul | Aug | Sep | Oct | Nov | Dec | Year |
|---|---|---|---|---|---|---|---|---|---|---|---|---|---|
| Record high °C (°F) | 15.1 (59.2) | 21.8 (71.2) | 31.2 (88.2) | 33.6 (92.5) | 38.1 (100.6) | 40.8 (105.4) | 41.1 (106.0) | 38.1 (100.6) | 35.6 (96.1) | 31.3 (88.3) | 23.5 (74.3) | 16.6 (61.9) | 41.1 (106.0) |
| Mean daily maximum °C (°F) | 2.7 (36.9) | 6.7 (44.1) | 13.9 (57.0) | 21.6 (70.9) | 27.6 (81.7) | 31.7 (89.1) | 32.3 (90.1) | 30.8 (87.4) | 27.2 (81.0) | 20.4 (68.7) | 11.2 (52.2) | 4.2 (39.6) | 19.2 (66.6) |
| Daily mean °C (°F) | −3.2 (26.2) | 0.4 (32.7) | 7.2 (45.0) | 14.9 (58.8) | 21.1 (70.0) | 25.5 (77.9) | 27.3 (81.1) | 25.9 (78.6) | 21.3 (70.3) | 14.2 (57.6) | 5.5 (41.9) | −1.3 (29.7) | 13.2 (55.8) |
| Mean daily minimum °C (°F) | −7.8 (18.0) | −4.5 (23.9) | 1.7 (35.1) | 8.9 (48.0) | 15.0 (59.0) | 20.0 (68.0) | 22.9 (73.2) | 21.8 (71.2) | 16.3 (61.3) | 9.0 (48.2) | 0.9 (33.6) | −5.5 (22.1) | 8.2 (46.8) |
| Record low °C (°F) | −20.2 (−4.4) | −15.3 (4.5) | −9.3 (15.3) | −2.4 (27.7) | 6.1 (43.0) | 9.6 (49.3) | 16.0 (60.8) | 13.9 (57.0) | 7.0 (44.6) | −2.8 (27.0) | −10.8 (12.6) | −19.6 (−3.3) | −20.2 (−4.4) |
| Average precipitation mm (inches) | 2.5 (0.10) | 6.6 (0.26) | 8.8 (0.35) | 20.6 (0.81) | 36.6 (1.44) | 64.6 (2.54) | 163.6 (6.44) | 118.3 (4.66) | 44.5 (1.75) | 33.7 (1.33) | 14.8 (0.58) | 2.6 (0.10) | 517.2 (20.36) |
| Average precipitation days (≥ 0.1 mm) | 1.6 | 2.3 | 2.9 | 5.0 | 6.0 | 8.4 | 11.5 | 10.4 | 6.1 | 5.2 | 3.7 | 2.0 | 65.1 |
| Average snowy days | 2.3 | 1.9 | 0.7 | 0.2 | 0 | 0 | 0 | 0 | 0 | 0 | 1.1 | 1.7 | 7.9 |
| Average relative humidity (%) | 57 | 53 | 49 | 51 | 54 | 62 | 74 | 78 | 71 | 65 | 64 | 60 | 62 |
| Mean monthly sunshine hours | 176.9 | 183.3 | 233.8 | 248.3 | 270.1 | 233.0 | 205.9 | 209.7 | 212.2 | 203.7 | 165.8 | 164.6 | 2,507.3 |
| Percentage possible sunshine | 58 | 60 | 63 | 62 | 61 | 53 | 46 | 50 | 58 | 60 | 55 | 56 | 57 |
Source: China Meteorological Administration
