= Phalante Bhumlu =

Phalante Bhumlu फलाँटे भुम्लु
- Village development committee
- Location in Nepal
- Coordinates: 27.619°N 85.727°E
- Country: Nepal
- Province: Bagmati Province
- District: Kavrepalanchok District

Population (1991)
  - Total: 1,691
- Time zone: UTC+5:45 (Nepal Time)

Phalante Bhumlu is a village development committee in Kabhrepalanchok District in Bagmati Province of central Nepal. At the time of the 1991 Nepal census it had a population of 1,691 and had 315 houses in it.
