= Bolde Fediche =

Bolde Fediche बाेल्दे फेदिचे
- Municipal Ward
- Nickname: बाेल्दे
- Location in Nepal
- Coordinates: 27.53°N 85.76°E
- Country: Nepal
- Province: Bagmati Province
- District: Kabhrepalanchok District
- Municipality: Temal Rural Municipality

Population (1991)
  - Total: 2,324
- Time zone: UTC+5:45 (Nepal Time)

Bolde Fhediche (Nepali: बाेल्दे फेदिचे) is a village development committee in Kabhrepalanchok District in Bagmati Province of central Nepal. At the time of the 2011 Nepal census it had a population of 2,041 and had 470 houses in it.

== Religious places ==
- Bhim Paila, situated on the banks of the Sunkoshi River
- Shiwalaya Temple
- Dorje Ghyang Gumba
- Sarashwoti Temple
