= Qingzhou, Hebei =

Town in Hebei, China

Coordinates: 38.5742°N 116.8220°E

Qingzhou (清州镇) is a town in Qing County, Hebei, China.
