= Budhakhani =

Budhakhani बुढाखानी
- Village development committee
- Location in Nepal
- Coordinates: 27.42°N 85.68°E
- Country: Nepal
- Province: Bagmati Province
- District: Kabhrepalanchok District

Population (1991)
  - Total: 3,336
- Time zone: UTC+5:45 (Nepal Time)

Budhakhani is a village development committee in Kabhrepalanchok District in Bagmati Province of central Nepal. At the time of the 1991 Nepal census it had a population of 3,336 and had 500 houses in it.
