= Jaisithok Mandan =

Jaisithok Mandan जैसीथोक मण्डन
- Village development committee
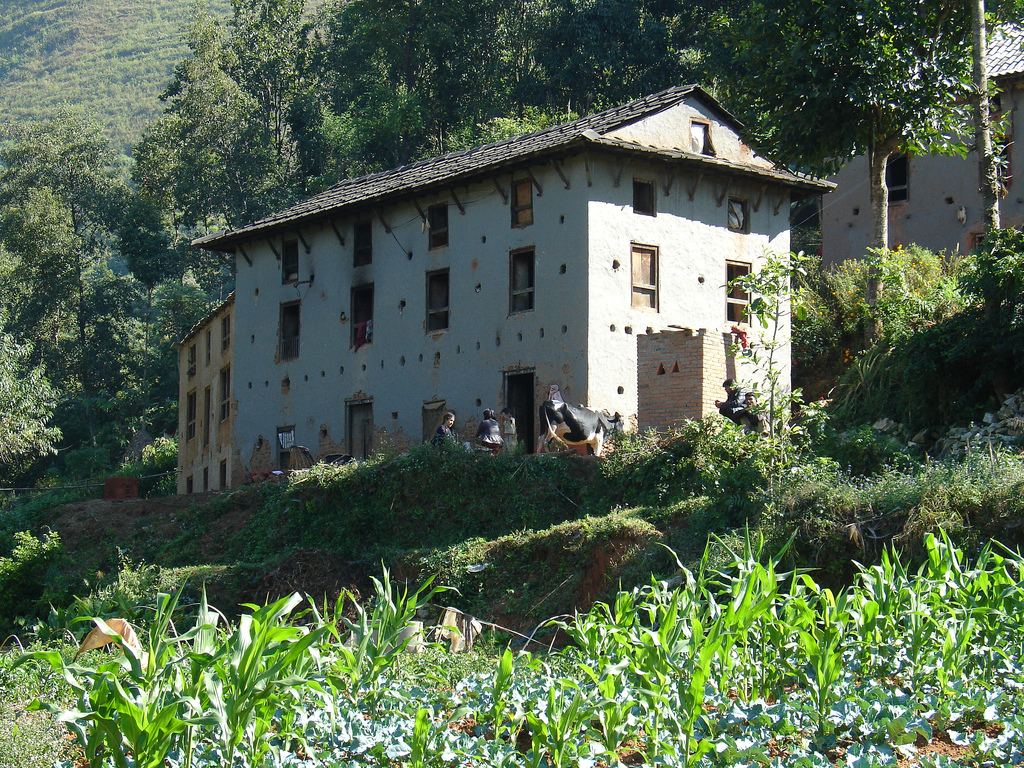

- Location in Nepal
- Coordinates: 27°43′N 85°38′E
- Country: Nepal
- Province: Bagmati Province
- District: Kabhrepalanchok District

Population (1991)
  - Total: 2,492
- Time zone: UTC+5:45 (Nepal Time)

Jaisithok Mandan is a village development committee in Kabhrepalanchok District in Bagmati Province of central Nepal. At the time of the 1991 Nepal census it had a population of 2,492 and had 458 houses in it. now it has become municipality mandan municipality
