= Chenzui Township =

Chenzui Township 陈嘴乡
- Rural Township
- Chénzuǐ Xiāng
- Location in Hebei Location in China
- Coordinates: 38°28′01″N 116°53′04″E
- Country: People's Republic of China
- Province: Hebei
- Prefecture-level city: Cangzhou
- County: Qing

Area
  - Total: 47.50 km^{2} (18.34 sq mi)

Population (2010)
  - Total: 16,755
  - Density: 352.7/km^{2} (913/sq mi)
- Time zone: UTC+8 (China Standard)

Chenzui Township (Chinese: 陈嘴乡; pinyin: Chénzuǐ Xiāng) is a rural township located in Qing County, Cangzhou, Hebei, China. According to the 2010 census, Chenzui Township had a population of 16,755, including 8,593 males and 8,162 females. The population was distributed as follows: 2,705 people aged under 14, 12,544 people aged between 15 and 64, and 1,506 people aged over 65.

== See also ==
- List of township-level divisions of Hebei
