= Salmechakala =

Coordinates: 27°23′N 85°30′E

Salmechakal साल्मेचाकल TALDHUNGA
- Village development committee
- Nickname: ताल्ढुङ्गा
- Interactive map of Salmechakal
- Country: Nepal
- Zone: Bagmati Zone
- District: Kabhrepalanchok District

Population (1991)
  - Total: 1,369
- Time zone: UTC+5:45 (Nepal Time)

Salmechakala is a village development committee in Kabhrepalanchok District in the Bagmati Zone of central Nepal. At the time of the 1991 Nepal census it had a population of 1,369 in 224 individual households.
