= Khahare Pangu =

Khahare Pangu खहरे पाङ्गु
- Village development committee
- Location in Nepal
- Coordinates: 27.50°N 85.58°E
- Country: Nepal
- Zone: Bagmati Zone
- District: Kabhrepalanchok District

Population (1991)
  - Total: 2,648
- Time zone: UTC+5:45 (Nepal Time)

Khahare Pangu is a village development committee in Kabhrepalanchok District in the Bagmati Zone of central Nepal. At the time of the 1991 Nepal census it had a population of 2,648 .
