= Saping =

Saping सापिङ
- Ward Number 1 of Bhumlu Gaupalika
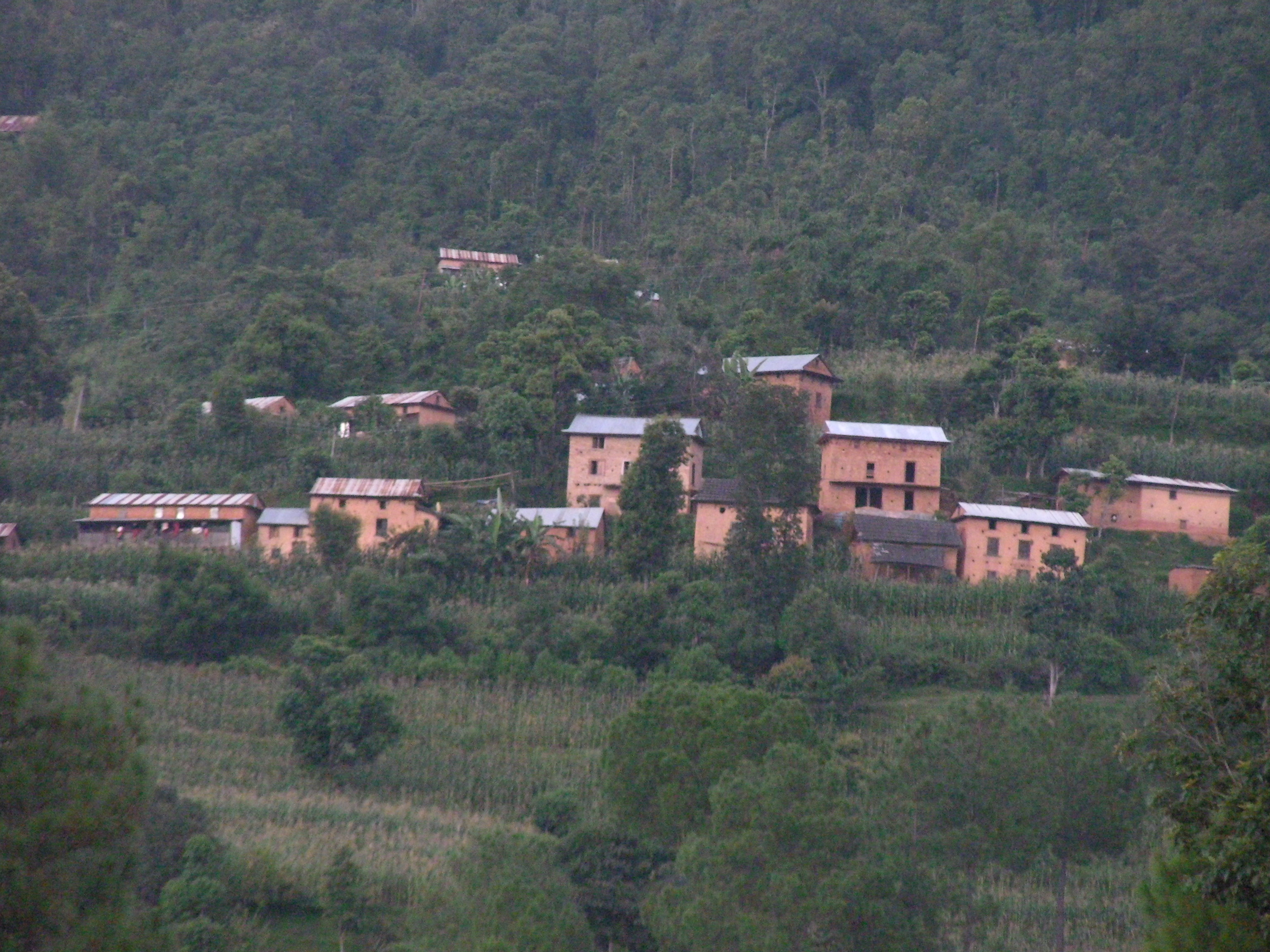
- Saping village before 2015 Earthquake

- Location in Nepal
- Coordinates: 27.66°N 85.75°E
- Country: Nepal
- Province: Bagmati Province
- District: Kabhrepalanchok District

Population (2011)
  - Total: 3,246
- Time zone: UTC+5:45 (Nepal Time)

Saping is a sparsely populated village in Kabhrepalanchok district, about 60 kilometres east of Kathmandu, Nepal. As of 2011 census, Saping village has 786 households with 3,246 individuals, 1,472 males and 1,774 females (CBS Nepal 2012), and under the "new" federal structure, formed by a new constitution, adopted on 20 September 2015, Saping is now a part of Bhumlu Gaupalika (in English: Bhumlu Rural Municipality) and is organized as Ward Number 1 (out of 10 small government units called 'wards', cf. in the pre-2015 era the village was called Saping Village Development Committee).

As a mixed ethnic and linguistic community, Saping has several well known travel destinations, including holy sites like Mulkharka Bhimsenthan and Saping Siddhi Ganesh Temple - both of which can be reached using vehicles or on foot from Dolalghat town, as a part of a (day or two) trekking adventure.

In terms of geography, Saping consists largely of a rough hill terrain, with a few patches of semi-flat land here and there; its height ranges from 633 meters at Dolalghat Sukhoshi river, 1,366 meters at Saping Siddhi Ganesh Temple (Ramche), to 1,805 meters at Mulkharka Bhimsenthan. Because of its rugged landscape and varied altitude, the climate system also varies in Saping, from subtropical jungle along the Sunkoshi river banks to temperate forest around Mulkharka Bhimsenthan.

The main source of income in Saping is agriculture, but in the recent years, the vast majority of young people have migrated to the cities, and many to foreign countries, especially to Arab countries in the Middle East, and Malaysia. As such, the remittances sent through foreign labour has become the primary source of livelihood for virtually all families. This has led to a rapid decline in agriculture as economically active population has largely moved out of the village. Elders are worried that unless the local and central governments make concerted efforts to keep (i.e. attract back) young people in the village, it appears likely that the village might rapidly lose its population and thereby risking its importance.

In Saping, the basic infrastructure such as road, electricity, water supply, etc. is still in a primitive state. There is a newly opened ruggy track from Silame Bhir (just above Sunkoshi river banks at Dolaghat), which is gradually being upgraded, but as of 2020 it is not yet clear how far this road network will be developed and whether it will be linked to other long routes in the surrounding districts of Sindhupalchok, Dolakha, Ramechhap, etc. Electricity has reached the villagers and as of February 2020 wooden poles have been upgraded with metal ones, making it a bit better lasting in the years ahead.

Especially after the devastating earthquakes of 2015, water supply has become one of the major concerns because many of the natural spring water sources have disappeared, but the villagers have been working on to bring piped water from far away sources.

There is a small health post nearby Lakuri Danda, where also Saping's (i.e. ward number one's) government unit is located, which was built during the post-2015 earthquakes reconstruction. Furthermore, the village has two secondary schools, one at Lakuri Danda, and other at Ritthe where students can finish their high school (i.e. 12 years of education). So far there is no legal agency or security police presence in the village.

In spite of being quite close to the Kathmandu valley, Saping remained largely backward. Only in the recent years, Sapingeli are becoming more hopeful because the first elected federal government (since 2018) has tried to allocate a sizable annual budget to develop rural governance and infrastructure.
