= Kartike Deurali =

Kattike Deurali कार्तिके देउराली ChauriDeurali
- Village development committee
- Motto: हाम्रो देउराली राम्रो देउराली
- Location in Nepal
- Coordinates: 27.55°N 85.81°E
- Country: Nepal
- Province: Province no.3

Population (1991)
  - Total: 3,214
- Time zone: UTC+5:45 (Nepal Time)

Kattike Deurali is a village development committee in Kavrepalanchok District in the Bagmati Zone of central Nepal. At the time of the 1991 Nepal census, it had a population of 3,214 in 533 individual households.
