= Pokhari Narayansthan =

Pokhari Narayansthan पोखरी नारायणस्थान
- Village development committee
- Location in Nepal
- Coordinates: 27.52°N 85.74°E
- Country: Nepal
- Zone: Bagmati Zone
- District: Kabhrepalanchok District

Population (1991)
  - Total: 3,106
- Time zone: UTC+5:45 (Nepal Time)
- Postal code: 45203
- Area code: 011

Pokhari Narayansthan (Nepali: पोखरी नारायणस्थान) is a village development committee in Kabhrepalanchok District in the Bagmati Zone of central Nepal. At the time of the 1991 Nepal census it had a population of 3,106 in 535 individual households.
