= Milche =

Milche मिल्चे
- Village development committee
- Location in Nepal
- Coordinates: 27.43°N 85.44°E
- Country: Nepal
- Zone: Bagmati Zone
- District: Kabhrepalanchok District

Population (1991)
  - Total: 2,073
- Time zone: UTC+5:45 (Nepal Time)

Milche is a village development committee in Kabhrepalanchok District in the Bagmati Zone of central Nepal. At the time of the 1991 Nepal census it had a population of 2,073 in 348 individual households.
