= Pangu, Hebei =

Pangu 盘古镇
- Town
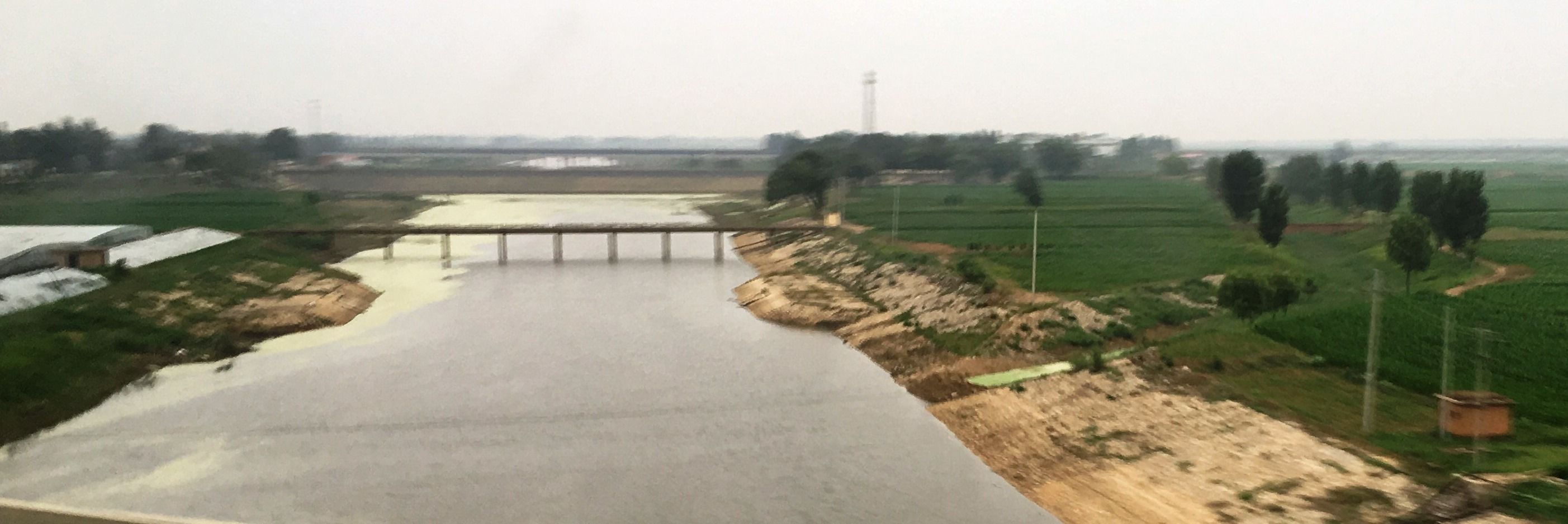
- Canal in Caoxinzhuang Village

- Location in Hebei
- Coordinates: 38°31′33″N 116°47′36″E
- Country: People's Republic of China
- Province: Hebei
- Prefecture-level City: Cangzhou
- County: Qing County
- Time zone: UTC+8 (China Standard)

Pangu (simplified Chinese: 盘古; traditional Chinese: 盤古; pinyin: Pángǔ) is a town under the administration of Qing County, Hebei, China. As of 2023, it administers the following 31 villages:

- Dapangu Village (大盘古村)
- Guanzhuang Village (官庄村)
- Lijiaying Village (李家营村)
- Beiliu Village (北柳村)
- Dixiatou Village (堤下头村)
- Nanliu Village (南柳村)
- Qiangeshangying Village (前阁上营村)
- Wujiayuan Village (吴家院村)
- Sujiayuan Village (苏家院村)
- Hemuzhuang Village (和睦庄村)
- Baizhuangzi Village (白庄子村)
- Weizhuangzi Village (魏庄子村)
- Xiaopangu Village (小盘古村)
- Daxingzhuang Village (大兴庄村)
- Nanwangzhuang Village (南王庄村)
- Hougeshangying Village (后阁上营村)
- Xiwangying Village (西王营村)
- Rulin Village (儒林村)
- Linzhuangzi Village (林庄子村)
- Jinjiaying Village (金家营村)
- Miao Village (苗村)
- Yuanli Village (园里村)
- Dongwangying Village (东王营村)
- Xiaoxinzhuang Village (小辛庄村)
- Caoxinzhuang Village (曹辛庄村)
- Wanghuangma Village (王黄马村)
- Tasizhuang Village (塔寺庄村)
- Sunjialou Village (孙家楼村)
- Siwotou Village (四沃头村)
- Beiyu'erzhuang Village (北渔二庄村)
- Mazhuangzi Village (马庄子村)
