= Birtadeurali =

Birtadeurali बिर्तादेउराली
- Village development committee
- Location in Nepal
- Coordinates: 27.56°N 85.76°E
- Country: Nepal
- Province: Bagmati Province
- District: Kabhrepalanchok District

Population (1991)
  - Total: 2,648
- Time zone: UTC+5:45 (Nepal Time)

Birtadeurali is a village development committee in Kabhrepalanchok District in Bagmati Province of central Nepal. At the time of the 1991 Nepal census it had a population of 2,648 and had 474 houses in it.
