= Chandeni Mandan =

Chandeni Mandan चण्डेनी मण्डन
- Village development committee
- Location in Nepal
- Coordinates: 27.70°N 85.66°E
- Country: Nepal
- Province: Bagmati Province
- District: Kabhrepalanchok District

Population (1991)
  - Total: 3,267
- Time zone: UTC+5:45 (Nepal Time)

Chandeni Mandan is a village development committee in Kabhrepalanchok District in Bagmati Province of central Nepal. At the time of the 1991 Nepal census it had a population of 3,267 and had 618 houses in it.
