= Chyamrangbesi =

Chyamrangbesi च्याम्राङबेंसी
- Village development committee
- Location in Nepal
- Coordinates: 27.49°N 85.47°E
- Country: Nepal
- Province: Bagmati Province
- District: Kabhrepalanchok District

Population (1991)
  - Total: 1,520
- Time zone: UTC+5:45 (Nepal Time)

Chyamrangbesi is a village development committee in Kabhrepalanchok District in Bagmati Province of central Nepal. At the time of the 1991 Nepal census it had a population of 1,520 and had 254 houses in it.
