= Phalametar =

Phalemetar फलामेटार
- Village development committee
- Location in Nepal
- Coordinates: 27.45°N 85.52°E
- Country: Nepal
- Province: Bagmati Province
- District: Kabhrepalanchok Distrikt

Population (1991)
  - Total: 3,560
- Time zone: UTC+5:45 (Nepal Time)

Phalemetar is a village development committee in Kabhrepalanchok District in Bagmati Province of central Nepal. At the time of the 1991 Nepal census it had a population of 3,560 and had 568 houses in it.
