= Pangu Township, Henan =

Pangu Township 盘古乡
- Township
- Location in Henan
- Coordinates: 32°39′34″N 113°18′32″E
- Country: People's Republic of China
- Province: Henan
- Prefecture-level city: Zhumadian
- County: Biyang County
- Village-level divisions: 4 residential communities, 16 villages
- Time zone: UTC+8 (China Standard)

Pangu Township (simplified Chinese: 盘古乡; traditional Chinese: 盤古鄉; pinyin: Pángǔ Xiāng) is a township of Biyang County, Henan province, China. As of 2023, it administers four residential communities — Xigang (席岗), Xuzhuang (许庄), Xizhuang (席庄), and Chaizhuang (柴庄) — and the following sixteen villages:

- Pangu Village
- Zhouzhuang Village (周庄村)
- Baishuzhuang Village (柏树庄村)
- Dongwangzhuang Village (东王庄村)
- Erlang Village (二郎村)
- Woniushan Village (卧牛山村)
- Moshan Village (磨山村)
- Damo Village (大磨村)
- Taoyuan Village (桃园村)
- Dongchong Village (董冲村)
- Yangxizhuang Village (杨西庄村)
- Liyuan Village (栗园村)
- Jiwa Village (吉洼村)
- Shishudi Village (柿树底村)
- Anzigou Village (安子沟村)
- Laodian Village (老店村)

== See also ==
- List of township-level divisions of Henan
