= Choubas =

Chaubas चौबास
- Village development committee
- Location in Nepal
- Coordinates: 27.63°N 85.78°E
- Country: Nepal
- Province: Bagmati Province
- District: Kabhrepalanchok

Population (1991)
  - Total: 2,233
- Time zone: UTC+5:45 (Nepal Time)

Chaubas is a village development committee in Kabhrepalanchok in Bagmati Province of central Nepal. At the time of the 1991 Nepal census it had a population of 2,233 and had 419 houses in it.
