= Banakhu Chor =

Banakhu Chor बनखु चोर
- Village development committee
- Location in Nepal
- Coordinates: 27.36°N 85.66°E
- Country: Nepal
- Province: Bagmati Province
- District: Kavrepalanchok District

Population (1991)
  - Total: 3,549
- Time zone: UTC+5:45 (Nepal Time)

Banakhu Chor (Nepali: बनखु चोर) is a village development committee in Kavrepalanchok District in Bagmati Province of central Nepal. At the time of the 1991 Nepal census it had a population of 3,549 and had 535 houses in it.
