= Walting, Kavrepalanchok =

Walting वाल्टिङ
- Village development committee
- Location in Nepal
- Coordinates: 27.45°N 85.73°E
- Country: Nepal
- Province: Bagmati Province
- District: Kavrepalanchok District

Population (1991)
  - Total: 2,212
- Time zone: UTC+5:45 (Nepal Time)

Walting is a village in Kavrepalanchok District in Bagmati Province of central Nepal. It is located in the Roshi Rural Municipality. At the time of the 1991 Nepal census it had a population of 2,212 and had 405 houses in it.
