= Dhunkharka Bahrabise =

Bethanchwok GP-Dhunkharka, Kavreplanchwok 'बेथानचाेक गाउँपालिका-ढुंखर्क, काभ्रेपलाञ्चाेक'
- Village development committee
- Location in Nepal
- Coordinates: 27.51°N 85.48°E
- Country: Nepal
- Province: Bagmati Province
- District: Kavrepalanchok District

Population (1991)
  - Total: 4,372
- Time zone: UTC+5:45 (Nepal Time)

Bethanchwok GP-Dhunkharka is a village development committee in Kavrepalanchok District in Bagmati Province of central Nepal. At the time of the 1991 Nepal census it had a population of 4,372 and had 747 houses in it.
