= Pangu Township, Hunan =

Pangu Township 盘古乡
- Township
- Location in Hunan
- Coordinates: 28°20′49″N 110°18′13″E
- Country: People's Republic of China
- Province: Hunan
- Prefecture-level city: Huaihua
- County: Yuanling County
- Village-level divisions: 16 villages
- Time zone: UTC+8 (China Standard)

Pangu Township (simplified Chinese: 盘古乡; traditional Chinese: 盤古鄉; pinyin: Pángǔ Xiāng) is a township of Yuanling County, Hunan province, China. As of 2023, it has sixteen villages under its administration:

- Pangu Village
- Lixikou Village (荔溪口村)
- Dongjiaping Village (董家坪村)
- Sanzhou Village (三洲村)
- Hongyan Village (红岩村)
- Qingmu Village (青木村)
- Anlongtou Village (安龙头村)
- Shuxikou Village (舒溪口村)
- Guihuaxi Village (桂花溪村)
- Shuangxi Village (双溪村)
- Lingtou Village (岭头村)
- Tiaoyan Village (跳岩村)
- Muzhou Village (木洲村)
- Ximenqiao Village (溪门桥村)
- Yangxi Village (杨溪村)
- Xiaopeng Village (小澎村)

== See also ==
- List of township-level divisions of Hunan
