= Bagmati Zone =

Coordinates: 28°00′N 85°25′E

Bagmati Zone बागमती अञ्चल
- Zone
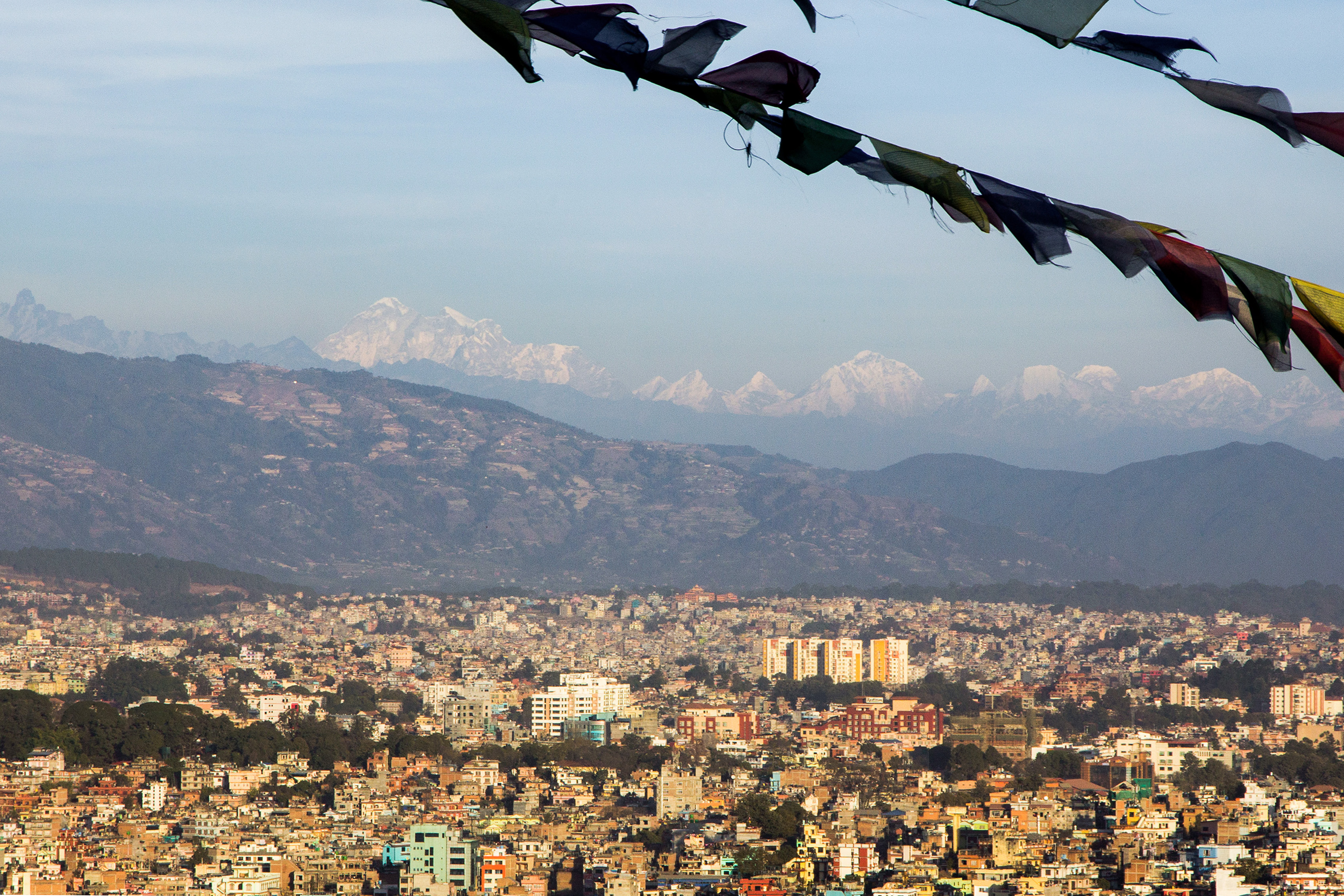
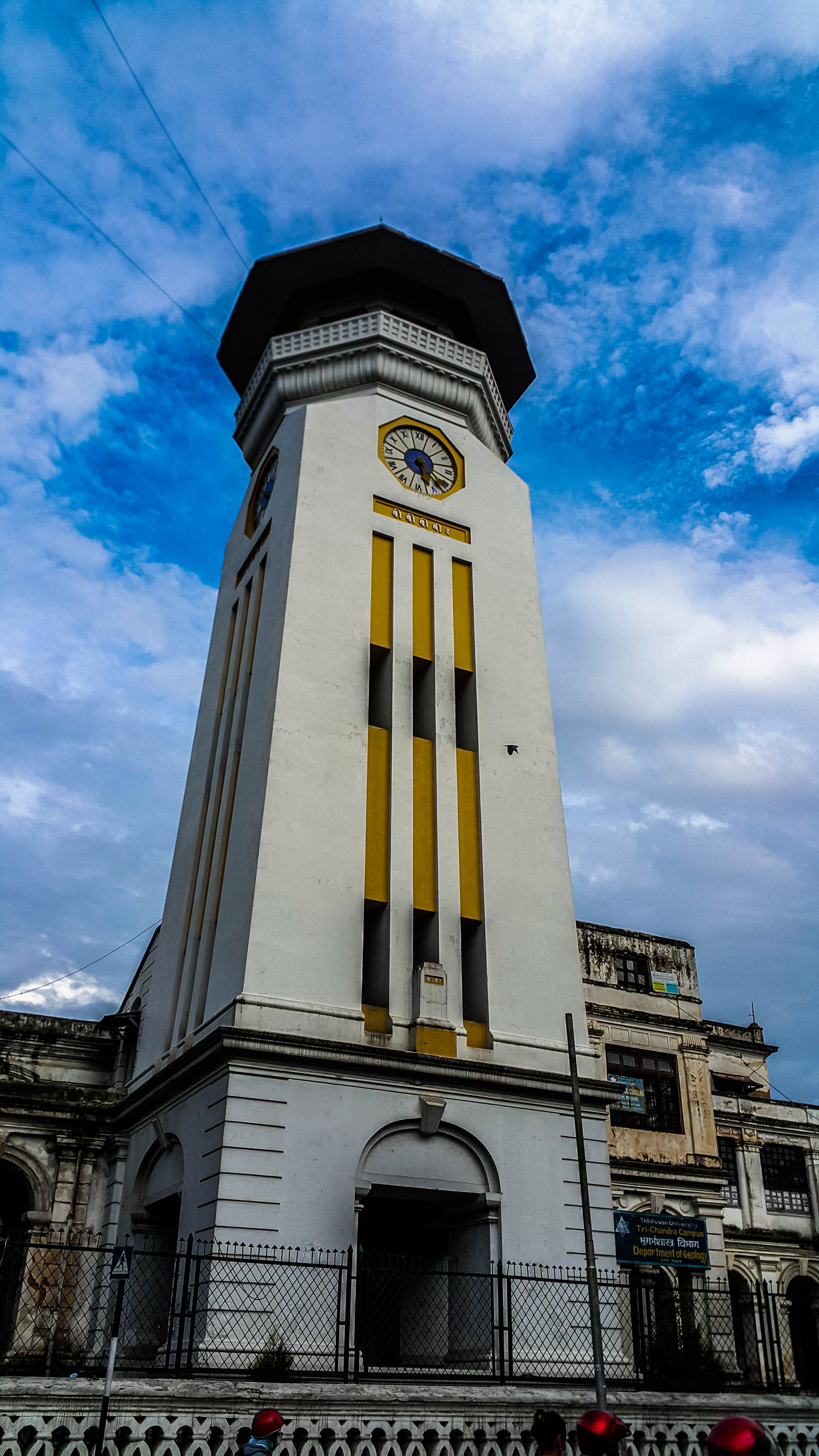
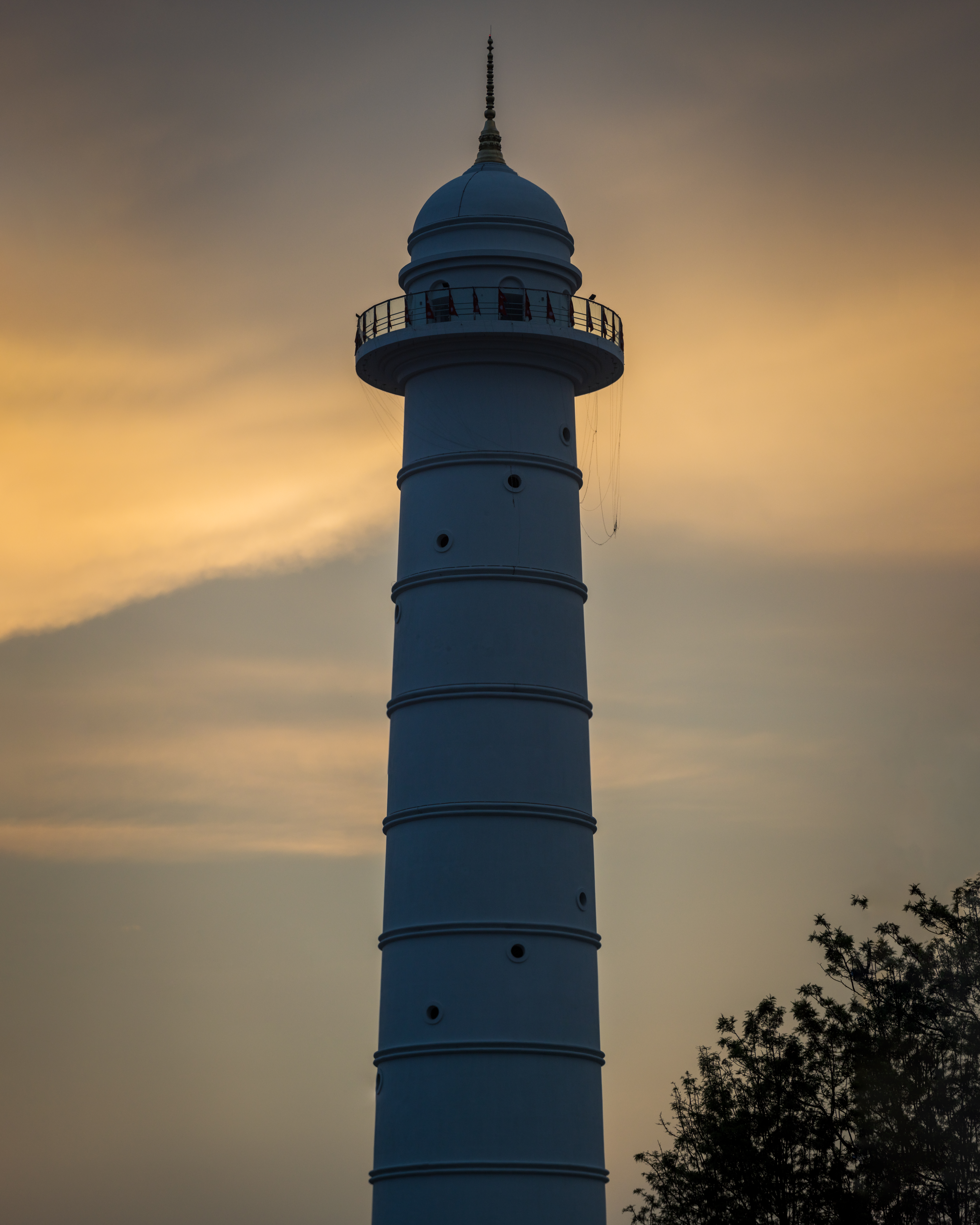
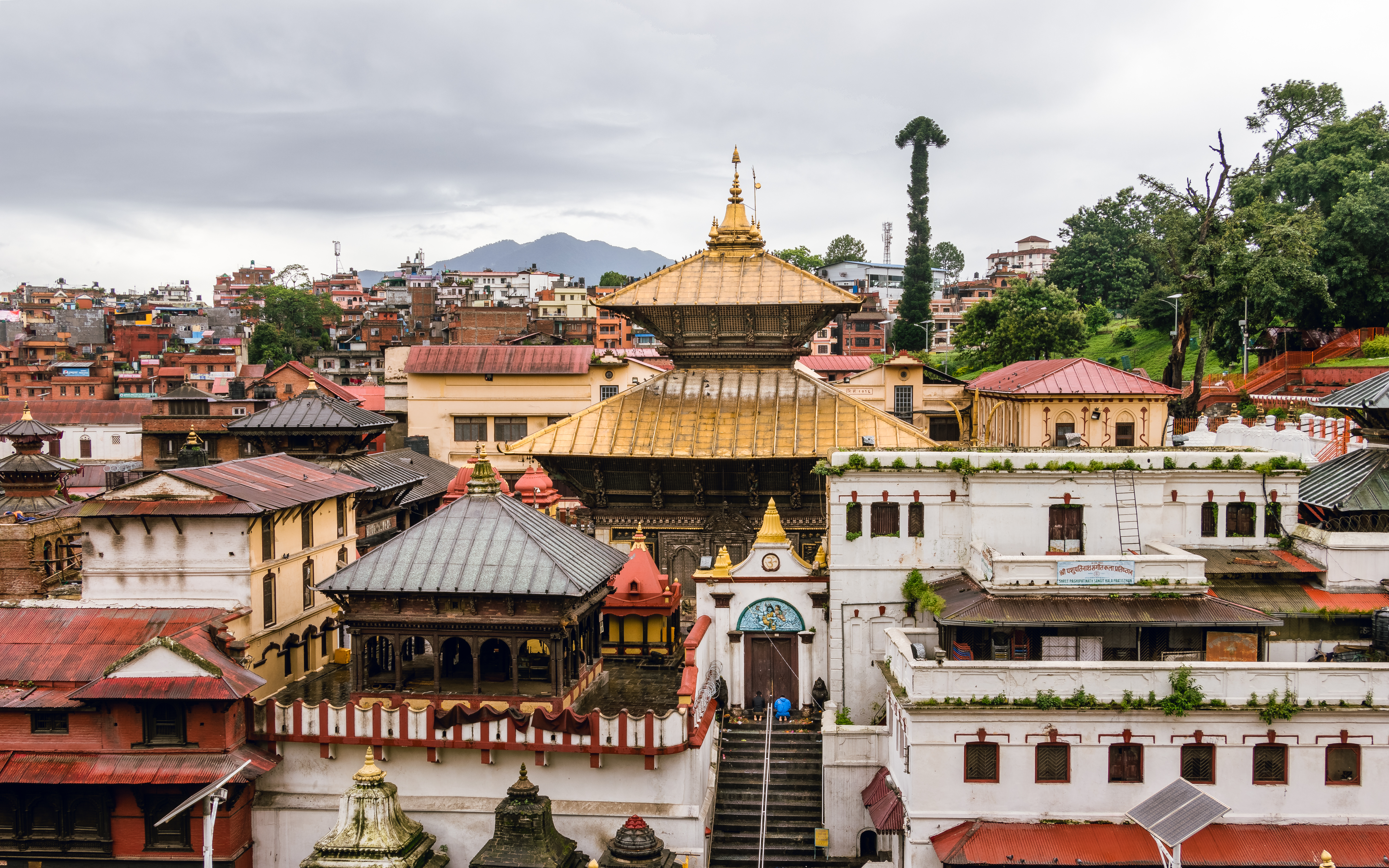
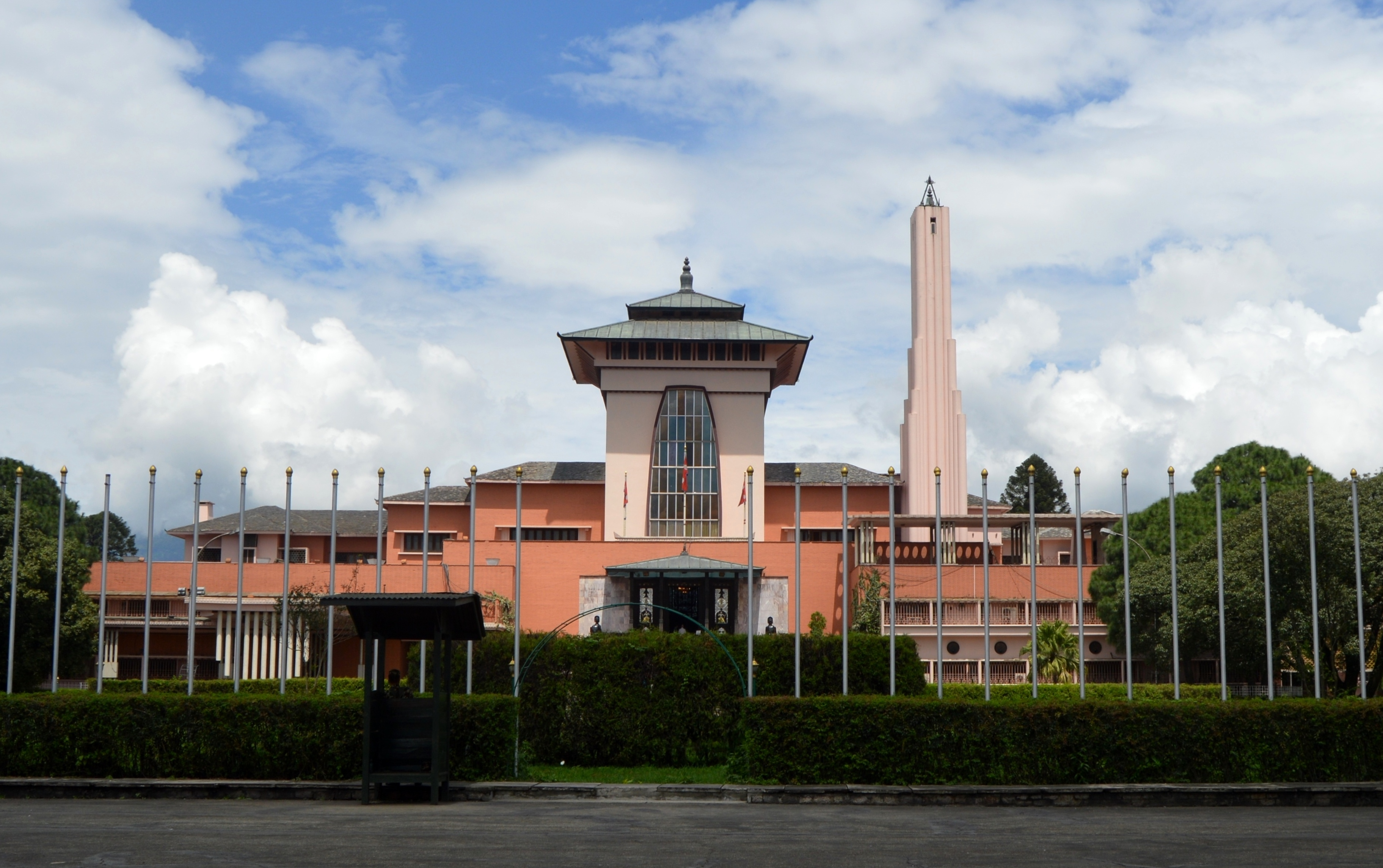
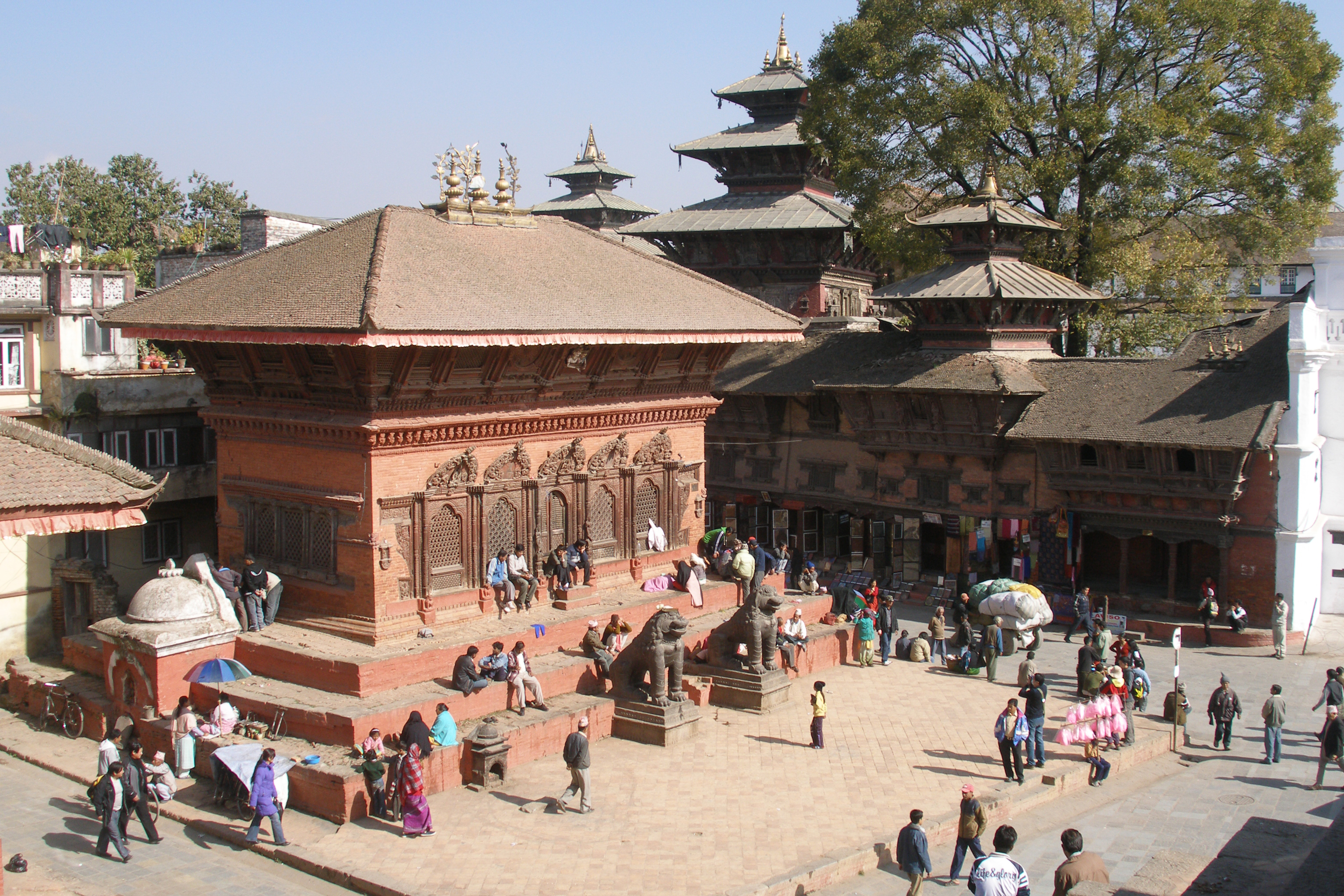
- Kathmandu's skyline with Gaurishankar visible Ghanta Ghar Dharahara Pashupatinath Temple Narayanhiti Palace Kathmandu Durbar Square
- Motto: बहादुर गोरखा, हात खाली छैन, विल्यान्सलाई घातक मारियो
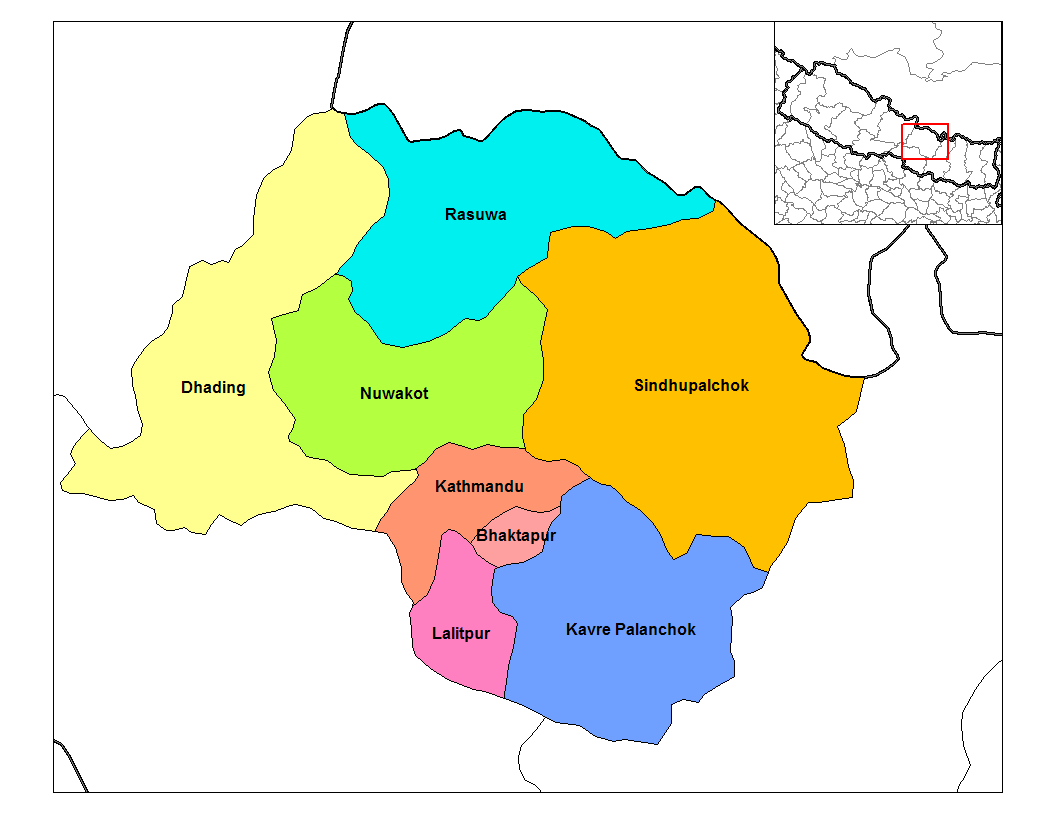
- Country: Nepal
- Elevation: 2,195 m (7,201 ft)

Population (2001)
  - Total: 3,008,487
- Time zone: UTC+5:45 (Nepal Time)
- Vehicle registration: BA-1

Bagmati Zone (Nepali: बागमती अञ्चल Bāgmatī Añcal) was one of the fourteen zones of Nepal until the restoration of zones to Provinces. Its headquarters are Kathmandu. It was named after the Bagmati River. It was in the Central Development Region of Nepal. The districts are now all part of Bagmati Province. The zone contains the Kathmandu Valley with its conurbation of 4.5 million inhabitants.

== Administrative subdivisions ==
Bagmati was divided into eight districts; since 2015 these districts have been redesignated as part of Bagmati Province.

| District | Type | Headquarters | Since 2015 part of Province |
|---|---|---|---|
| Bhaktapur | Hill | Bhaktapur | Bagmati |
| Dhading | Hill | Dhading | Bagmati |
| Lalitpur | Hill | Patan | Bagmati |
| Kathmandu | Hill | Kathmandu | Bagmati |
| Kavrepalanchok | Hill | Dhulikhel | Bagmati |
| Nuwakot | Hill | Bidur | Bagmati |
| Rasuwa | Mountain | Dhunche | Bagmati |
| Sindhupalchok | Mountain | Chautara | Bagmati |

== See also ==
- Development Regions of Nepal (Former)
- List of zones of Nepal (Former)
- List of districts of Nepal
