= Kavrepalanchok District =

Coordinates: 27°37′N 85°33′E

Kavrepalanchok District काभ्रेपलाञ्चोक जिल्ला
- District
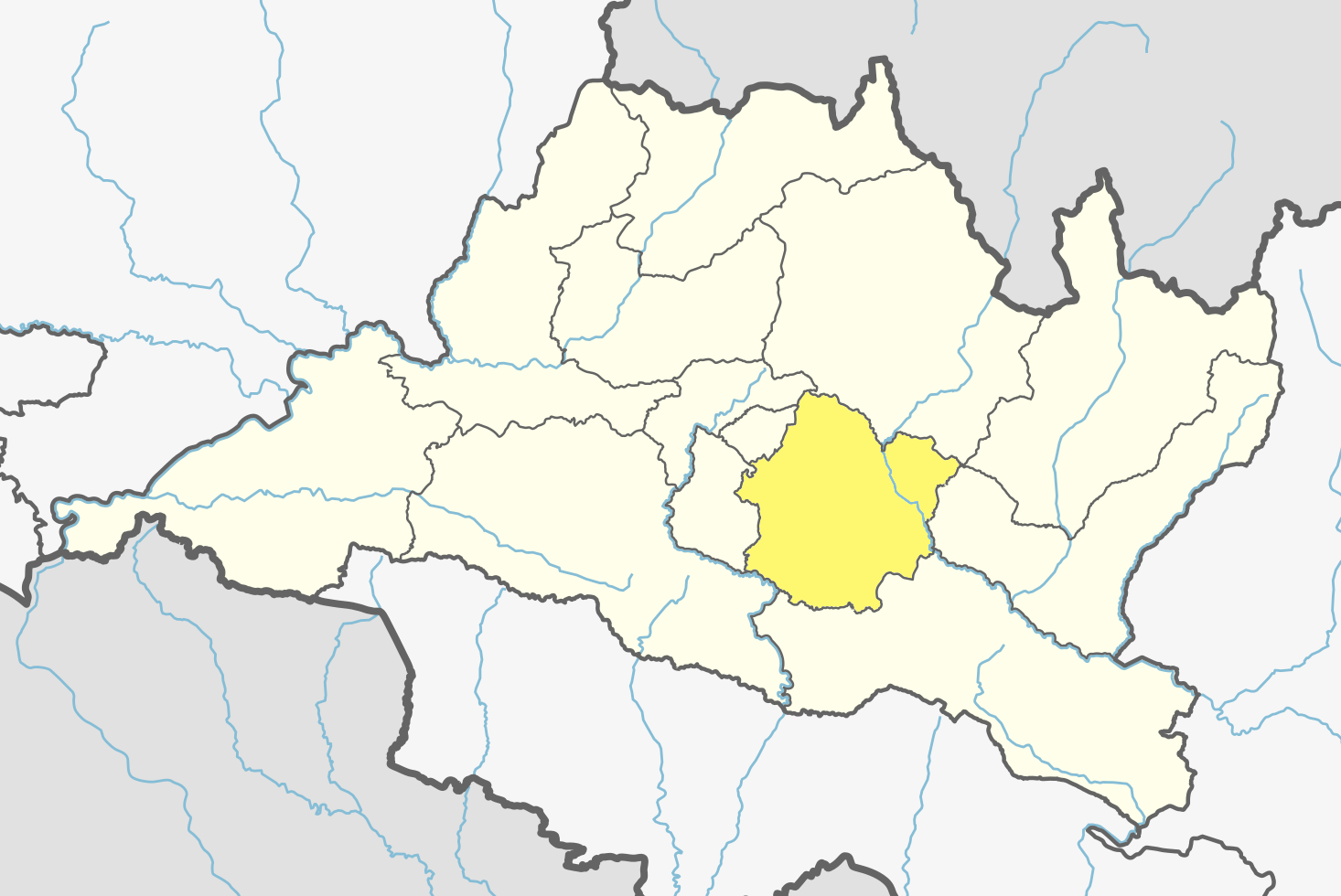
- Location of district in Bagmati province
- Country: Nepal
- Province: Bagmati Province
- Admin HQ.: Dhulikhel

Government
  - Type: Coordination committee
  - Body: DCC, Kavrepalanchok

Area
  - Total: 1,396 km^{2} (539 sq mi)

Population (2021)
  - Total: 364,039
  - Density: 260.8/km^{2} (675.4/sq mi)
- Time zone: UTC+05:45 (NPT)
- Postal Codes: 45200
- Telephone Code: 011
- Main Language(s): Nepali; Newari; Tamang
- Website: Official website

Kavrepalanchok District (Nepali: काभ्रेपलाञ्चोक जिल्ला; IAST: Kābhrepalāñcok pronounced [kabʱrepʌˈlant͡sok]) also known as Kavre is one of the seventy-seven districts of Nepal. The district, with Dhulikhel as its district headquarters, covers an area of 1,396 km^{2} (539 sq mi). It is a part of Bagmati Province and has a population of 364,039.

Nepal's Information Technology Park is also located in this district.

== Geography and climate ==
Climate Zone	Elevation Range	% of Area
Lower Tropical	below 300 meters (1,000 ft)	0.1%
Upper Tropical	300 to 1,000 meters 1,000 to 3,300 ft.	23.6%
Subtropical	1,000 to 2,000 meters 3,300 to 6,600 ft.	65.3%
Temperate	2,000 to 3,000 meters 6,400 to 9,800 ft.	9.6%

== Demographics ==
Historical population
Census year	Pop.	±% p.a.
1981	307,150	—
1991	324,329	+0.55%
2001	385,672	+1.75%
2011	381,937	−0.10%
2021	364,039	−0.48%
Source: Citypopulation

At the time of the 2021 Nepal census, Kavrepalanchok District had a population of 364,039. 6.76% of the population is under 5 years of age. It has a literacy rate of 75.68% and a sex ratio of 1035 females per 1000 males. 244,982 (67.30%) lived in municipalities.

Castes/ethnic groups in Kavrepalanchowk District (2021)
1. Tamang (33.8%)
2. Bahun (20.1%)
3. Chhetri (13.6%)
4. Newar (13.4%)
5. Magar (4.00%)
6. Kami (2.58%)
7. Sarki (2.09%)
8. Danuwar (1.73%)
9. Damai (1.62%)
10. Thakuri (1.06%)
11. Bhujel (0.97%)
12. Pahari (0.90%)
13. Other Hill Janjati (2.39%)
14. Others (1.76%)

Ethnicity wise: Hill Janjatis were the largest group, making up 43% of the population. Tamangs were the largest Hill Janjatis, making up 34% of the population and Magars 4% of the population. Khas are the second largest group, making up 43% of the population. Newars were the third largest group, making up 13% of the population.

Languages of Kavrepalanchowk district (2021)
1. Nepali (50.4%)
2. Tamang (33.1%)
3. Nepal Bhasha (10.9%)
4. Magar (1.62%)
5. Danuwar (1.40%)
6. Others (2.53%)

At the time of the 2021 census, 50.39% of the population spoke Nepali, 33.15% Tamang, 10.91% Nepal Bhasha, 1.62% Magar and 1.40% Danuwar as their first language. In 2011, 50.5% of the population spoke Nepali as their first language.

Religion in Kavrepalanchowk District (2021)
Religion	Percent
Hinduism	63.31%
Buddhism	33.89%
Christianity	2.11%
Other or not stated	0.69%

== Administration ==
The district consists of 13 municipalities, out of which six are urban and seven rural municipalities. These are as follows:

Rank	Name	Population (2021)	Area (km^{2})	Density (/km^{2})	Major Neighbourhoods and Places
1	Banepa Municipality	67,690	54.60	1,240	Chandeshwori, Sanga, Mahendrajyoti, Nala
2	Bethanchok Rural Municipality	14,959	101.02	148	Dhunkharka, Chyamrangbesi, Chalal Ganeshsthan
3	Bhumlu Rural Municipality	15,678	91.49	171	Jyamdi, Salle Bhumlu, Choubas, Dolalghat
4	Chauri Deurali Rural Municipality	14,076	97.85	144	Majhi Feda, Kartike Deurali, Madan Kundari, Birtadeurali
5	Dhulikhel Municipality	33,726	54.62	617	
6	Khani Khola Rural Municipality	12,201	131.7	93	Phalametar, Salmechakala
7	Mahabharat Rural Municipality	16,079	185.99	86	Gokule, Banakhu Chor
8	Mandandeupur Municipality	30,381	88.62	343	
9	Namobuddha Municipality	26,160	102.4	255	Methinkot
10	Panauti Municipality	51,504	118.2	436	Indreswor
11	Panchkhal Municipality	35,521	102.9	345	Palanchok, Koshidekha, Hokse Bazar
12	Roshi Rural Municipality	23,790	176.3	135	Sipali, Walting, Bhimkhori
13	Temal Rural Municipality	16,957	88.85	191	Narayansthan, Bolde, Parsel

== Healthcare ==
The small health centers in many village development committees(VDCs) are without auxiliary health workers, Auxiliary Nurse Midwives (ANMs), and community health workers. As a consequence, people seeking emergency health assistance are forced to travel long distances to the district headquarters or Kathmandu, and may even end up dying without access to treatment. Many individuals still believe in Jhakri (shamans and diviners) and are reluctant to seek medical help.

PHASE Nepal, an NGO, provides many health care facilities and training programs to Rayale, a VDC of the Kavrepalanchok district. Currently, PHASE Nepal works on several projects in this district including community health and education, teacher training programmes, and hygiene and sanitation programmes.

== Tourism ==
Kavrepalanchok district has great potential in the tourism industry. It is culturally rich with historical places like Dhulikhel, Sangaswoti-Bangthali, Panauti, Banepa and Chandeni Mandan. Chandeni Mandan contains the lowest and highest points of the district, the Indravati River and Thamdanda, respectively; the latter offers hiking and panoramic views of the Himalayas. There are big religious fairs like the Chandeshwori Jatra of Banepa, the Namobuddha Jatra of Namobuddha, celebrated on the birth date of Buddha (Buddha Purnima), and the Kumbha Mela of Panauti, which occurs every twelve years.

The Long Himalayan Gaurishankar range can be seen from Dhulikhel and the Sangaswoti Range. Kavrepalanchok is famous for short trekking routes such as Dhungkharka-Narayanthan and Dhulikhel-Kavre-Namobuddha-Sankhu-Panauti-Banepa. Other places of interest include Saping Siddhi Ganesh Temple, Saping Mulkharka Bhimsenthan, Palanchok Bhagwati, Namobuddha, Dhulikhel, Gaukhureshwar, Hajar Sidhi (1000 Steps to Kali Devi Temple), Devisthan, Thulo Bangthali, Talu Dada View Tower, Gosainthan, Banepa, Khopasi, Pasthali, Balthali, Ladkeshwar Mahadev, Nepalthok, Patlekhet, Phulbari, Dapcha and many more.

The Kailashnath Mahadev Statue at Sanga is another major religious and tourist attraction in the district. The approximately 143-foot (43.5 m) statue of Shiva is one of the prominent landmarks of the Kathmandu Valley and attracts pilgrims and visitors throughout the year.

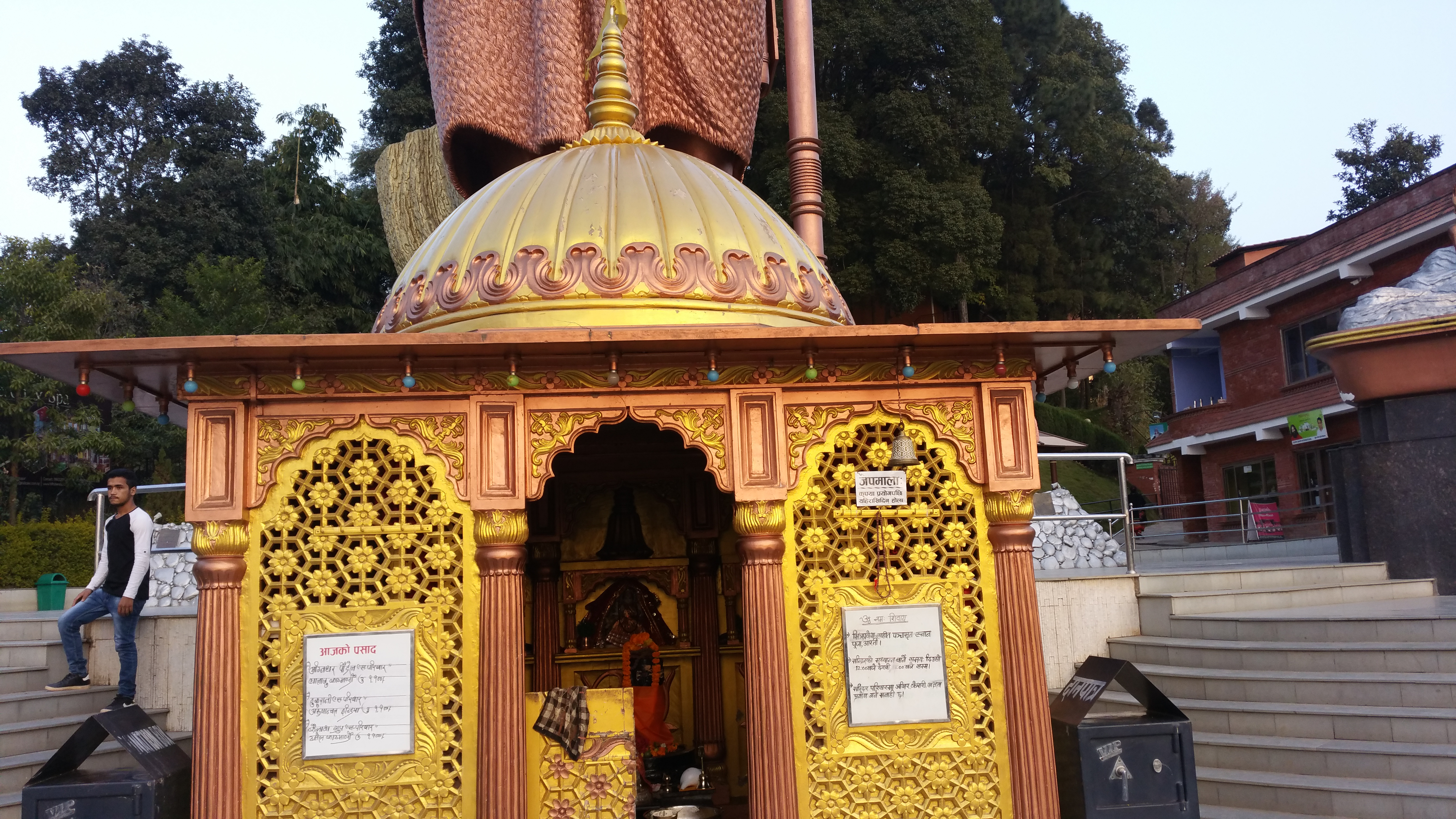
Kailashnath Mahadev Statue at Sanga

Fortune Resort & Wellness Spa Bhaktapur is a hospitality and wellness destination in the Sanga area, near the Kailashnath Mahadev Statue. The resort provides accommodation, dining, wellness and recreational facilities and contributes to the growing tourism infrastructure of the Sanga area.

Koshipari (i.e. east of Dolalghat/Sunkoshi River) has very good prospect in tourism field. There are many adventurous places such as Thulo Bangthali. Recently a new trail known as Sangaswoti Range Hills Trail has been opened for hikers. Though the road network is still under development and a good paved road is lacking, Koshipari can certainly be used as a cycling spot. Once the road network is improved, the area has potential to develop into additional tourism destinations. There are already homestays and lodges in Thulo Bangthali. Many travellers choose the Laure-Bangthali trail to reach Shailung and Everest. The wild native forest in the Bangthali area is rich in biodiversity. More than 700 different kinds of herbs are found in this jungle. The area has also become known for bird watching and volunteering.

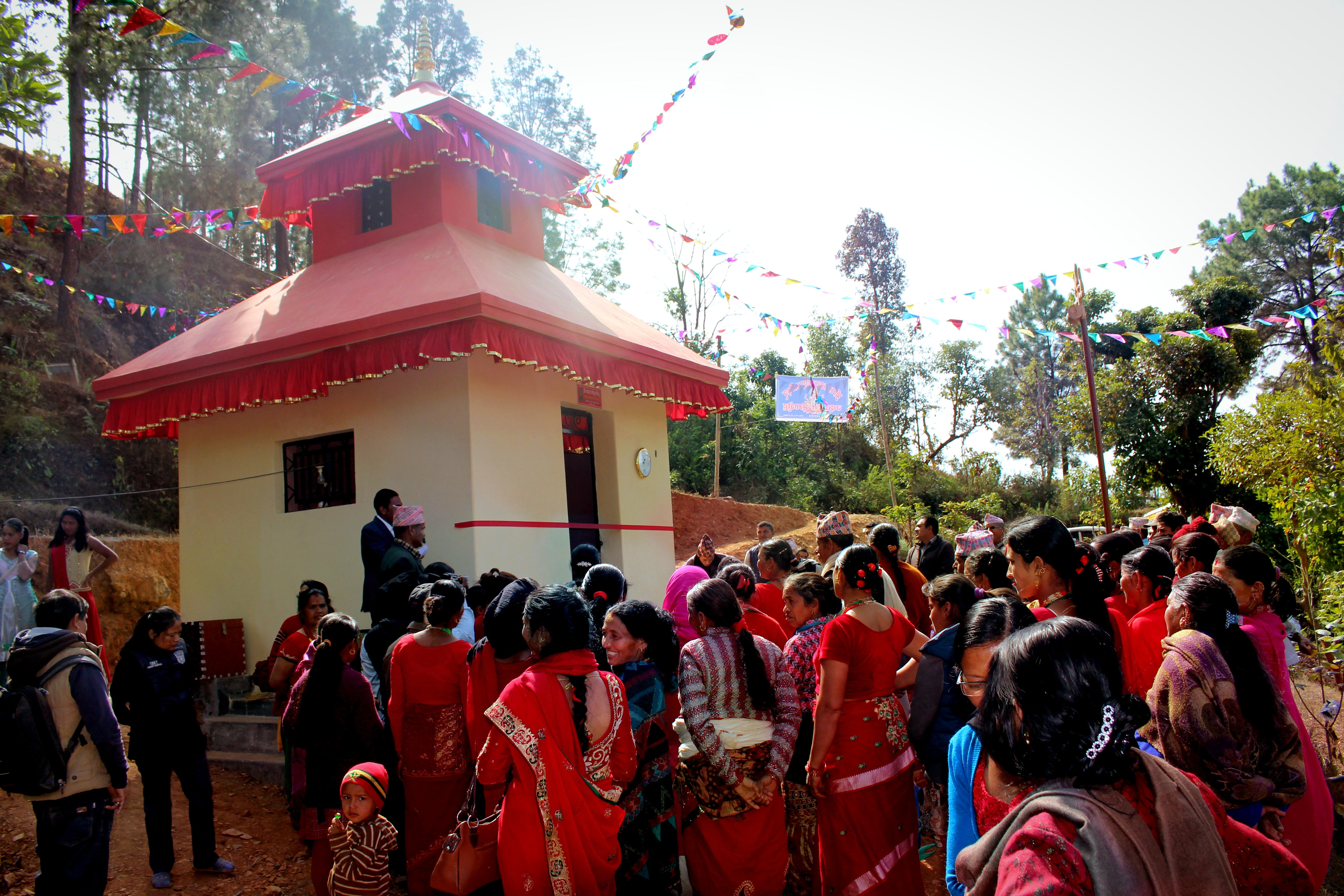
Saping Siddhi Ganesh Temple (Ramche), Kavrepalanchok.

== Religious places in Kavrepalanchok ==
- Mulkharka Bhimsenthan (Saping),
- Saping Siddhi Ganesh Temple, (Ramche)
- Khandadevi (Nagregagarche)
- Kuseshwor Mahadev (Nepalthok)
- Dhaneshwor Mahadev (Banepa),
- Chandeshwori Mata (Banepa),
- Bikateswor Mahadev (Banepa),
- Indrashwor Mahadev (Panauti),
- ugrachandi Bhagawati (Nala),
- lokeswor karunamaya nala
- Dankali Devi (Eklekhet),
- Timal Narayan dham (Timal),
- Palanchok Bhagawati Temple,
- Kedhreshwor Mahadev,
- Khopasi,
- Fadkeshwor Mahadev,
- Ladku Ladkeshwor Mahadev.
- Namo Buddha Monastery

== Education ==
There are many private and governmental schools providing education to the secondary level within the district.

Kathmandu University, located in Dhulikhel is the third-oldest university in Nepal.
