= Chhathar Rural Municipality =

Chhathar छथर गाउँपालिका
- Rural Municipality
- Location in Koshi Province Chhathar (Nepal)
- Coordinates: 27.04°N 87.45°E
- Province: Koshi Province
- District: Tehrathum
- Wards: 6
- Established: 10 March 2017

Government
  - Type: Rural Council
  - Chairperson: Mr.Santabir Limbu (NCP)
  - Vice-chairperson: Mrs.Tara Kharel Dhakal (NCP)

Area
  - Total: 133.93 km^{2} (51.71 sq mi)

Population (2011)
  - Total: 16,715
  - Density: 124.80/km^{2} (323.24/sq mi)
- Time zone: UTC+5:45 (Nepal Standard Time)
- Headquarter: Hamarjung
- Website: official website

Chhathar (Nepali: छथर गाउँपालिका) is a rural municipality (gaunpalika) out of four rural municipality located in Tehrathum District of Koshi Province of Nepal. There are a total of 6 municipalities in Tehrathum in which 2 are urban and 4 are rural.

According to Ministry of Federal Affairs and Local Development Chhathar has an area of 133.93 square kilometres (51.71 mi^{2}) and the total population of the municipality is 16715 as of Census of Nepal 2011.

Sudap, Okhare, Phakchamara, Panchakanya Pokhari Hamarjung and Angdim which previously were all separate Village development committee merged to form this new local level body. Fulfilling the requirement of the new Constitution of Nepal 2015, Ministry of Federal Affairs and Local Development replaced all old VDCs and Municipalities into 753 new local level body (Municipality).

The rural municipality is divided into total 6 wards and the headquarter of this newly formed rural municipality is situated in Hamarjung.

== Demographics ==
At the time of the 2011 Nepal census, Chhathar Rural Municipality had a population of 16,715. Of these, 49.7% spoke Nepali, 40.5% Limbu, 3.7% Tamang, 2.6% Magar, 1.3% Sherpa, 0.5% Gurung, 0.3% Bhujel, 0.3% Newar, 0.2% Sunwar, 0.1% Doteli, 0.1% Rai and 0.2% other languages as their first language.

In terms of ethnicity/caste, 41.2% were Limbu, 23.9% Chhetri, 6.9% Hill Brahmin, 4.7% Kami, 3.8% Tamang, 3.4% Newar, 3.2% Sarki, 2.8% Damai/Dholi, 2.8% Magar, 2.0% Gharti/Bhujel, 1.5% Gurung, 1.4% Sherpa, 1.4% Thakuri, 0.3% Sunuwar, 0.2% Terai Brahmin, 0.2% Rai, 0.1% Yadav and 0.4% others.

In terms of religion, 54.6% were Hindu, 35.8% Kirati, 8.5% Buddhist, 0.8% Christian and 0.2% others.

In terms of literacy, 72.1% could read and write, 2.1% could only read and 25.8% could neither read nor write.
