= Aathrai Rural Municipality =

Place in Nepal

Aathrai आठराई गाउँपालिका
- Rural Municipality
- Location in Koshi Province Aathrai (Nepal)
- Coordinates: 27.21°N 87.64°E
- Province: Koshi Province
- District: Tehrathum
- Wards: 7
- Established: 10 March 2017

Government
  - Type: Rural Council
  - Chairperson: Mr. Maan B. Limbu (CPN (US))
  - Vice-chairperson: Mrs. Rupa Devi Kandangwa (NCP)

Area
  - Total: 167.07 km^{2} (64.51 sq mi)

Population (2011)
  - Total: 21,747
  - Density: 130.17/km^{2} (337.13/sq mi)
- Time zone: UTC+5:45 (Nepal Standard Time)
- Headquarter: Sankranti Bazar
- Website: official website

Aathrai (Nepali: आठराई गाउँपालिका) is a rural municipality (gaunpalika) out of four rural municipality located in Tehrathum District of Koshi Province of Nepal. There are a total of 6 municipalities in Tehrathum in which 2 are urban and 4 are rural.

According to Ministry of Federal Affairs and Local Developme Aathrai has an area of 167.07 square kilometres (64.51 mi^{2}) and the total population of the municipality is 21747 as of Census of Nepal 2011.

Aatharai Rural Municipality (gaunpalika) has 7 wards. The Headquarter/Center of the municipality is Sankranti Bazar (Ward no.1) and consist of villages like Khamlalung (Ward no.2), Hawaku (Ward no.3), Iwa (Ward no.4), Chhate Dhunga (Ward no.5), Chuhandanda (Ward no.6) Thoklung (Ward no.7), and which previously were all separate Village development committee merged to form this new local level body. Fulfilling the requirement of the new Constitution of Nepal 2015, Ministry of Federal Affairs and Local Development replaced all old VDCs and Municipalities into 753 new local level body (Municipality).

The rural municipality is divided into total 7 wards and the headquarter of this newly formed rural municipality is situated in Sankranti Bazar. It is known widely for being the birthplace of former Nepalese Prime Minister KP Sharma Oli, Nepali Congress leader Krishna Prasad Sitaula, Communist leader Radha Krishna Mainali and journalist Tirtha Raj Niraula.

== Demographics ==
At the time of the 2011 Nepal census, Aathrai Rural Municipality had a population of 21,747. Of these, 48.8% spoke Nepali, 30.6% Limbu, 10.8% Tamang, 2.6% Magar, 1.9% Gurung, 1.7% Rai, 1.0% Newar, 0.8% Sherpa, 0.6% Majhi, 0.4% Yakkha, 0.2% Sanskrit, 0.1% Bantawa, 0.1% Maithili and 0.1% other languages as their first language.

In terms of ethnicity/caste, 31.3% were Limbu, 20.0% Hill Brahmin, 11.1% Tamang, 10.8% Chhetri, 6.6% Kami, 3.7% Damai/Dholi, 3.3% Gurung, 2.9% Magar, 2.3% Newar, 2.0% Rai, 1.8% Sarki, 1.4% Gharti/Bhujel, 0.9% Sherpa, 0.8% Majhi, 0.4% Sanyasi/Dasnami, 0.4% Yakkha, 0.1% Khawas and 0.2% others.

In terms of religion, 49.8% were Hindu, 31.0% Kirati, 17.5% Buddhist, 0.8% Christian, 0.6% Prakriti and 0.3% others.

In terms of literacy, 72.7% could read and write, 2.1% could only read and 25.1% could neither read nor write.
