= Laligurans Municipality =

Laligurans लालीगुराँस
- Municipality
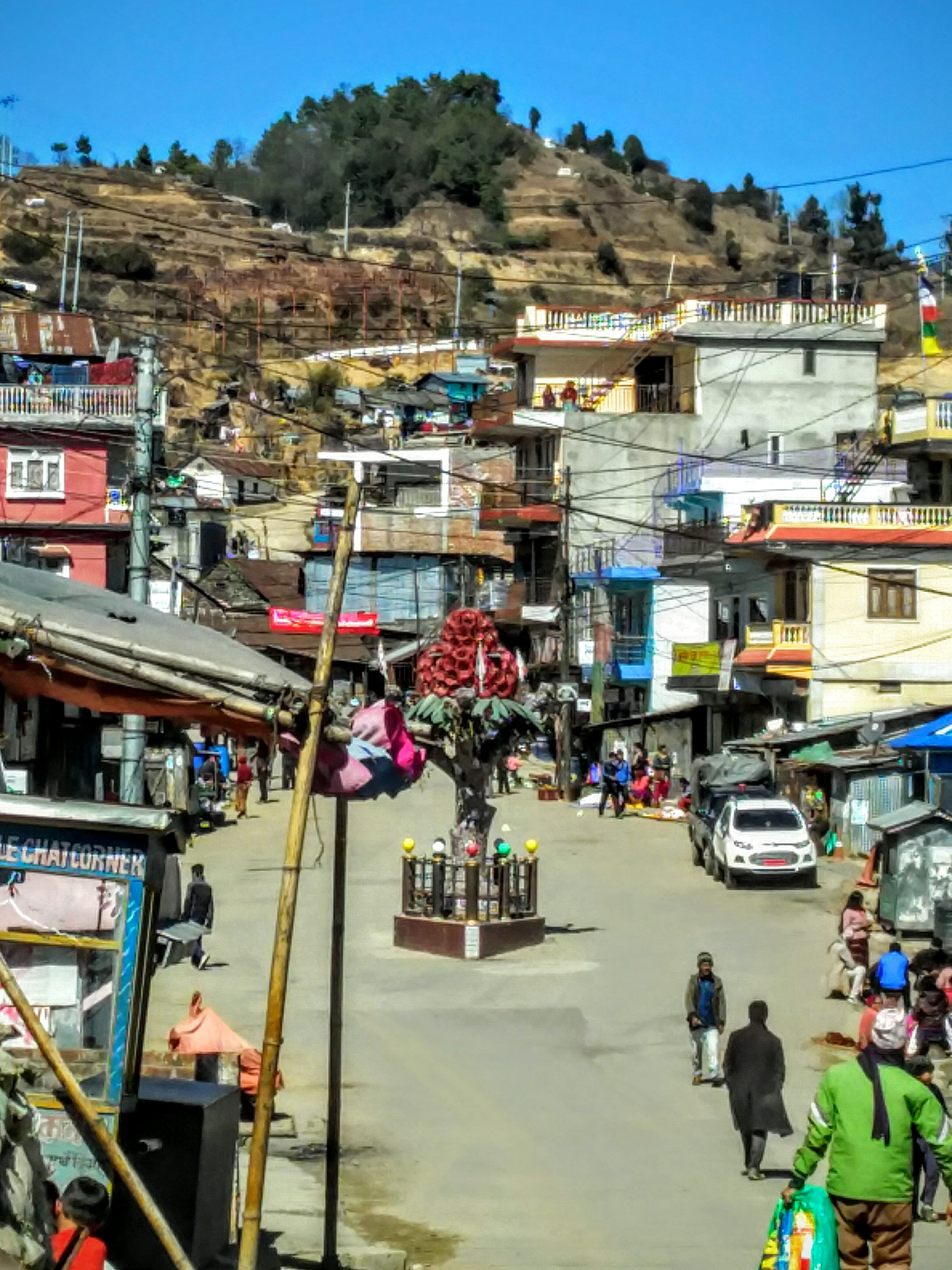
- Basantpur Bazar in Laligurans municipality

- Location in Koshi Province Laligurans (Nepal)
- Coordinates: 27.14°N 87.43°E
- Country: Nepal
- Province: Koshi Province
- District: Terhathum
- Established: 19 Sep 2015

Government
  - Type: Mayor–council
  - Mayor: Mr. Arjun Mabohang (NC)
  - Deputy mayor: Mrs. Jamuna Magar Karki (NC)

Area
  - Total: 90.27 km^{2} (34.85 sq mi)
- Highest elevation: 3,065 m (10,056 ft)
- Lowest elevation: 560 m (1,840 ft)

Population (2011)
  - Total: 16,970
  - Density: 188.0/km^{2} (486.9/sq mi)
- Time zone: UTC+5:45 (Nepal Time)
- Postal code: 57103
- Area code: 026
- Website: laliguransmun.gov.np

Laligurans (Nepali: लालीगुराँस) is a municipality located in Terhathum District in the Koshi Province of eastern Nepal. The municipality was established on 19 September 2015 by merging the existing Basantapur, Phulek, Dangpa, Sungnam and Solma village development committees (VDCs). The seat of the municipality is established in Basantpur. At the time of the 2011 Nepal census after merging the five VDCs population it had a total population of 16,934 persons. After the government decision the number of municipalities has reached 217 in Nepal.

== Demographics ==
At the time of the 2011 Nepal census, Laligurans Municipality had a population of 17,000. Of these, 51.4% spoke Nepali, 29.8% Limbu, 6.1% Magar, 4.3% Gurung, 3.0% Rai, 1.9% Tamang, 1.4% Newar, 0.7% Sherpa, 0.3% Maithili, 0.3% Yakkha, 0.1% Hindi and 0.3% other languages as their first language.

In terms of ethnicity/caste, 32.4% were Limbu, 29.7% Chhetri, 7.7% Gurung, 6.4% Hill Brahmin, 6.4% Magar, 3.8% Rai, 2.5% Damai/Dholi, 2.2% Newar, 2.2% Tamang, 2.0% Kami, 1.0% Sherpa, 0.9% Gharti/Bhujel, 0.6% Sarki, 0.5% Badi, 0.5% Yakkha, 0.3% Sanyasi/Dasnami, 0.3% Thakuri, 0.1% Teli, 0.1% Tharu and 0.5% others.

In terms of religion, 50.7% were Hindu, 30.6% Kirati, 16.8% Buddhist and 1.8% Christian.

In terms of literacy, 75.7% could read and write, 2.0% could only read and 22.3% could neither read nor write.

== Tourism ==
Basantpur is a major tourist place to watch mountains and places surrounding it. Limbu culture attract’s tourist to reside there. Lasune is one of the most important place’s for internal and external tourism. Lasune Bazar, Lasun Stamba, Tea Garden, Patle Pokhari, Kala Pani, Tinjure Hill, Rat Pokhari, Kesari Taar, Dhap Taar etc. are also places tourists go to.
