= Sindhupalchok 1 =

Parliamentary constituency in Bagmati Province, Nepal

- Parliamentary constituency
- Sindhupalchok 1 in Bagmati Province
- Province: Bagmati Province
- District: Sindhupalchok District
- Electorate: 139,930
- Major settlements: Bahrabise, Khadichaur, Chautara

Current constituency
- Created: 1991
- Party: Rastriya Swatantra Party
- Member of Parliament: Bharat Prasad Parajuli
- Local Levels: Jugal Rural Municipality; Bhotekoshi Rural Municipality; Trupurasundari Rural Municipality; Lisankhu Pakhar Rural Municipality; Sunkoshi Rural Municipality; Balephi Rural Municipality; Bahrabise Municipality; Chautara Sangachokgadhi Municipality (Wards 2–4, 9, 10)

Sindhupalchok 1 is one of two parliamentary constituencies of Sindhupalchok District in Nepal. This constituency came into existence on the Constituency Delimitation Commission (CDC) report submitted on 31 August 2017.

== Incorporated areas ==
Sindhupalchok 1 parliamentary constituency incorporates Jugal Rural Municipality, Bhotekoshi Rural Municipality, Trupurasundari Rural Municipality, Lisangkhu Pakhar Rural Municipality, Sunkoshi Rural Municipality, Balephi Rural Municipality, Barhabise Municipality and, wards 2–4, 9 and 10 of Chautera Sangachokgadhi Municipality.

== Assembly segments ==
It encompasses the following Bagmati Provincial Assembly segment

- Sindhupalchok 1(A)
- Sindhupalchok 1(B)

== Members of Parliament ==
=== Parliament/Constituent Assembly ===
Election	Member	Party
1991	Amrit Kumar Bohora	CPN (Unified Marxist–Leninist)
1999	Mohan Bahadur Basnet	Nepali Congress
2008	Raj Kumar Shrestha	CPN (Maoist)
January 2009	Raj Kumar Shrestha	UCPN (Maoist)
2013	Mohan Bahadur Basnet	Nepali Congress
2017	Agni Prasad Sapkota	CPN (Maoist Centre)
May 2018	Agni Prasad Sapkota	Nepal Communist Party
March 2021	Agni Prasad Sapkota	CPN (Maoist Centre)
2022	Madhav Sapkota	CPN (Maoist Centre)
2026	Bharat Prasad Parajuli	Rastriya Swatantra Party

=== Provincial Assembly ===
==== 1(A) ====
Election	Member	Party
2017	Arun Prasad Nepal	CPN (Unified Marxist–Leninist)
May 2018	Arun Prasad Nepal	Nepal Communist Party

==== 1(B) ====
Election	Member	Party
2017	Suresh Nepal	CPN (Unified Marxist–Leninist)
May 2018	Suresh Nepal	Nepal Communist Party

== Election results ==
=== Election in the 2020s ===
==== 2022 general election ====
Candidate	Party	Votes	%
Madhav Sapkota	CPN (Maoist Centre)	30,408	46.05
Suresh Nepal	CPN (UML)	27,066	40.99
Dinesh Shrestha	Rastriya Swatantra Party	3,503	5.31
Narayan Pandey	Rastriya Prajatantra Party	1,651	2.50
Krishna Bahadur Thakuri	CPN (Marxist–Leninist)	1,111	1.68
Others		2,289	3.47
Total		66,028	100.00
Majority		3,342	
CPN (Maoist Centre) hold			

=== Election in the 2010s ===
==== 2017 legislative elections ====
Party	Candidate	Votes
CPN (Maoist Centre)	Agni Prasad Sapkota	40,504
Nepali Congress	Mohan Bahadur Basnet	29,795
Janasamjbadi Party Nepal	Hasta Bahadur Bishwakarma	1,702
Others		1,244
Invalid votes		5,448
Result	Maoist Centre gain	
Source: Election Commission

==== 2017 Nepalese provincial elections ====
===== Sindhupalchok 1(A) =====
Party	Candidate	Votes
CPN (Unified Marxist–Leninist)	Arun Prasad Nepal	21,712
Nepali Congress	Bishnu Bahadur Khatri	14,633
Others		1,116
Invalid votes		2,231
Result	CPN (UML) gain	
Source: Election Commission

===== Sindhupalchok 1(B) =====
Party	Candidate	Votes
CPN (Unified Marxist–Leninist)	Saresh Nepal	22,837
Nepali Congress	Rajendra Kumar Shrestha	12,187
Others		1,519
Invalid votes		2,315
Result	CPN (UML) gain	
Source: Election Commission

==== 2013 Constituent Assembly election ====
Party	Candidate	Votes
Nepali Congress	Mohan Bahadur Basnet	15,021
CPN (Unified Marxist–Leninist)	Arun Prasad Nepal	14,989
UCPN (Maoist)	Saral Sahayatri Paudel	10,330
Rastriya Prajatantra Party	Dharma Raj Bhandari	6,567
Others		1,428
Result	Congress gain	
Source: NepalNews

=== Election in the 2000s ===
==== 2008 Constituent Assembly election ====
Party	Candidate	Votes
CPN (Maoist)	Raj Kumar Shrestha	21,320
CPN (Unified Marxist–Leninist)	Arun Prasad Nepal	13,124
Nepali Congress	Mohan Bahadur Basnet	7,671
Rastriya Prajatantra Party	Pashupati SJB Rana	5,966
CPN (Marxist–Leninist)	Lakpa Shrepa	2,814
Others		2,009
Invalid votes		3,089
Result	Maoist gain	
Source: Election Commission

=== Election in the 1990s ===
==== 1999 legislative elections ====
Party	Candidate	Votes
Nepali Congress	Mohan Bahadur Basnet	19,168
CPN (Unified Marxist–Leninist)	Amrit Kumar Bohora	15,956
Rastriya Prajatantra Party	Pashupati SJB Rana	10,098
Others		2,359
Invalid Votes		1,277
Result	Congress gain	
Source: Election Commission

==== 1994 legislative elections ====
Party	Candidate	Votes
CPN (Unified Marxist–Leninist)	Amrit Kumar Bohora	13,369
Rastriya Prajatantra Party	Pashupati SJB Rana	13,179
Nepali Congress	Rohini Raj Sigdel	7,189
Others		1,928
Result	CPN (UML) hold	
Source: Election Commission

==== 1991 legislative elections ====
Party	Candidate	Votes
CPN (Unified Marxist–Leninist)	Amrit Kumar Bohora	13,583
Nepali Congress	Mohan Bahadur Basnet	11,972
Result	CPN (UML) gain	

== See also ==
- List of parliamentary constituencies of Nepal
