= Basantapur =

Basantapur may refer to several places in Nepal:

- Basantapur, Kathmandu
- Basantapur, Tehrathum
- Basantapur, Gandaki
- Basantapur, Janakpur
- Basantapur, Kapilvastu
- Basantapur, Kosi
- Basantapur, Sunsari
- Basantapur, Rupandehi
- Basantapur, Mahakali
- Basantapur, Rautahat
