= Batase =

Batase may refer to:

- Batase, Sindhupalchok, village in Bagmati Zone, Nepal
- Batase, Kavrepalanchok, village in Bagmati Zone, Nepal
- Batase, Khotang, village in Sagarmatha Zone, Nepal
- Batase, Terhathum, village in Kosi Zone, Nepal
