= Hyatung Falls =

Waterfall in Nepal

Hyatrung Jharana
- Interactive map of Hyatrung Jharana
- Location: Between Ishibu and Samdu VDCs of Terhathum District, Nepal
- Coordinates: 27°12′26″N 87°34′31″E
- Elevation: Approximately 1500 metres high from sea level
- Total height: 365 metres
- Total width: 200 m (660 ft)
- Average width: 200 m (660 ft)
- Watercourse: Hyatung Khola (tributary of Tamur River)

Hyatung or Hyatrung Falls (Nepali: ह्यत्रुङ्ग झरना) is the fourth highest waterfall in Asia and second in Nepal. It is located between Ishibu and Samdu VDCs of Terhathum District in Kosi Zone of eastern Nepal and has a height of 365 metres.

It has been stated, in an article in the Nepali Times, that the falls are "reportedly the largest in Asia". moreover, as per recent news published in various article it is the third highest in the Asia.

== Tourism ==
Efforts are being made to encourage tourists in the area but at present facilities are not well developed. The waterfall is described as being at one day's walk from Myanglung bazaar.

== See also ==
- List of waterfalls
- List of waterfalls of Nepal
