= Bimala Tumkhewa =

Nepali poet and journalist (born 1978)

Bimala Tumkhewa Limbu
- विमला तुम्खेवा ᤘᤡᤔᤗᤠ ᤋᤢᤶᤂᤣᤘᤠ
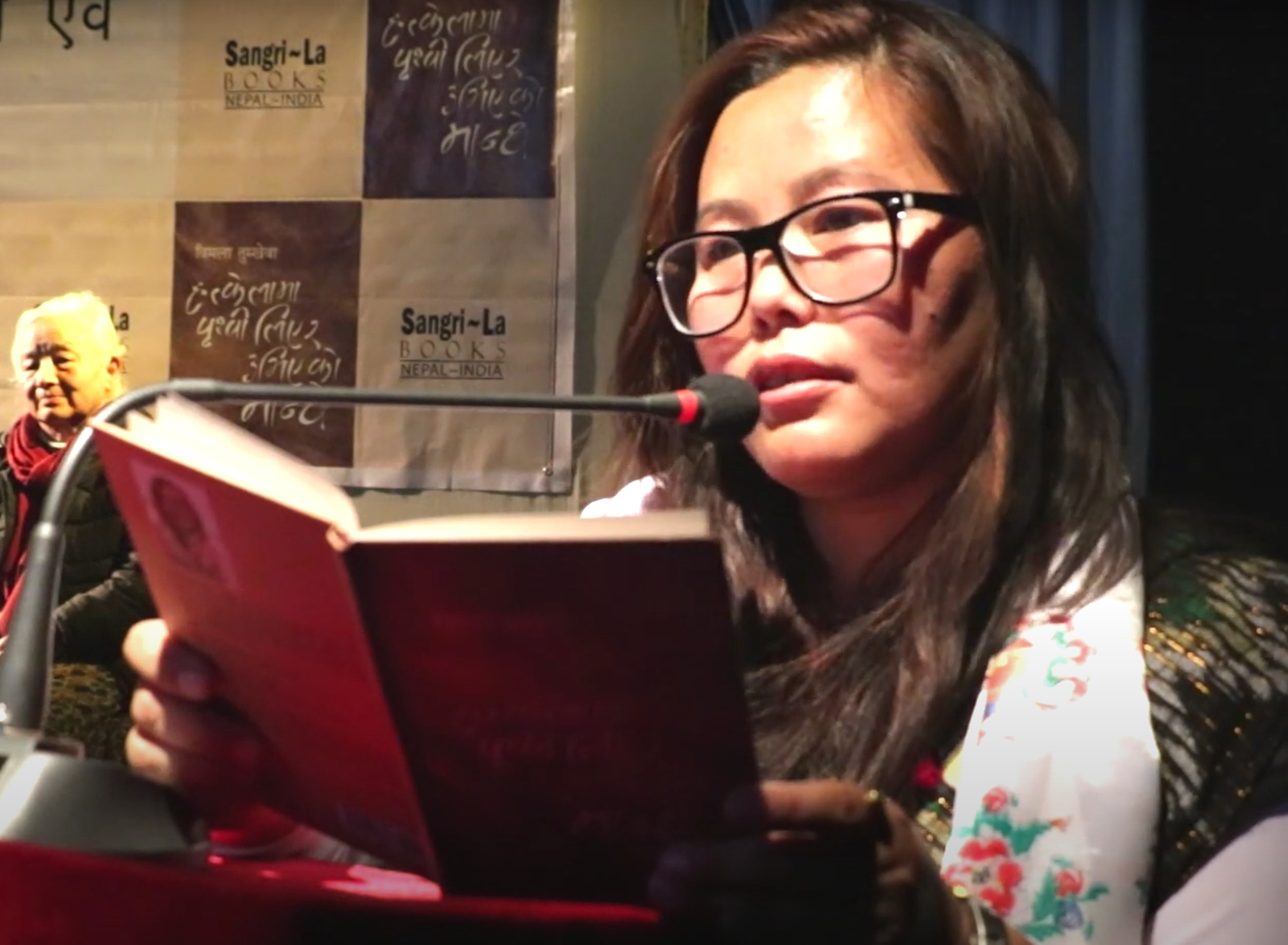
- Tumkhewa at the launch event of her book Hatkelama Prithvi Liyera Ubhiyeko Manche (2019)
- Born: 1978 (age 47–48); Okhare, Tehrathum, Nepal
- Occupations: Poet; journalist
- Notable work: Hatkelama Prithivi Liyera Ubhieko Manchhe

Bimala Tumkhewa Limbu (Nepali: विमला तुम्खेवा) is a Nepali poet, writer and journalist. Her works are centered around the themes of feminism and ethnic identity. She has published four poetry collections till date. She is also the General Secretary for Sancharika Samuha (Women Journalists Union) and a member of Women Security Pressure Group. One of her poems is included in the curriculum in first year of Bachelors of Far-western University and the sixteen constituent colleges.

== Early life ==
She was born in 1978 (2034 BS) in Okhare village of Tehrathum district. She grew up in Pathari, Morang district. Her father was an ex-British Army soldier. When she was 10 years old, she read Maxim Gorky’s Mother and Parijat’s Shirishko Phool. Those two books left a deep impression on her. She started writing poems since she was in seventh grade of school. Her first poem was called Ma (I), which she recited in front of a crowd of 1500 people gathered in a cultural show in the town. She started attending various literary events when she was in eleventh grade of her high school. She read various Nepali literary magazines such as Madhuparka, Garima and Yuvamanch.

== Literary career ==
She used to recite her poems on radio programs in Radio Nepal. When she was 17, her poem was published on national magazine Garima. Her first collection Bimala Tumkhewaka Kabitaharu was published in 1999. She then started getting some recognitions in eastern Nepal.

She then started writing for Blast Times, a newspaper from Dharan. After that she and a group of friends started a local newspaper called Hello, Pathari. Through the paper, she started her journey in journalism. She moved to Kathmandu in 2001 during Nepalese Civil War. She started writing for national level newspapers like Rajdhani.

She published her second book Nadi, Chaal ra Tarangharu in 2004.

She is also an active participant in Tangsing - 2077, an annual literary event with Limbu poets. The event is organized by Yakthung Lekhak Sangh (Yakthung Writers Organization). Poems of ethnic identity of Limbu people and Limbuwan kingdom are recited in the event.

Her third book was published in 2009. The book was launched in an event in Siddhartha Art Gallery, Kathmandu.

In 2016, she participated in Stockholm Nepali Kavita Mahotsav (Stockholm Nepali Poetry Festival) in Sweden. The event was organized by Nepal Mandap (Nepali Cultural Association of Sweden) on February 28, 2016.

She published her fourth poetry anthology on Mar 22, 2019. The book was launched by veteran poet Bairagi Kainla in the premises of Nepal Academy. Poets Toya Gurung and Aahuti were present on the release event.

She is also working on a short story collection.

== Works ==
=== Poetry Anthologies ===
- Bimala Tumkhewaka Kabitaharu (transl. Poems of Bimala Tumkhewa , 1999)
- Nadi, Chaal ra Tarangharu (transl. River, Waves and Ripples, 2004)
- Samsmaran Euta Budho Rukhko (transl. The Memoir of an Old Tree, 2009)
- Hatkelama Prithvi Liyera Ubhiyeko Manche (transl. A Person Standing with the Earth in Their Hands, 2019)

== Awards ==
In 2020, she was awarded with Pratibha award from Nepali Pratibha Pratisthan, a premier socio-literary UK based Nepalese organization.

On October 28, 2021, she was honored with Harsha Bahadur Budha Magar Sahitya Samman-2021 by Dr. Harsha Bahadur Budha Magar Memorial Foundation for her contribution to Nepali literature.

== See also ==
- Bina Theeng Tamang
- Bhuwan Dhungana
- Neelam Karki Niharika
