= Agni Prasad Sapkota =

Nepalese politician (born 1958)

- अग्निप्रसाद सापकोटा
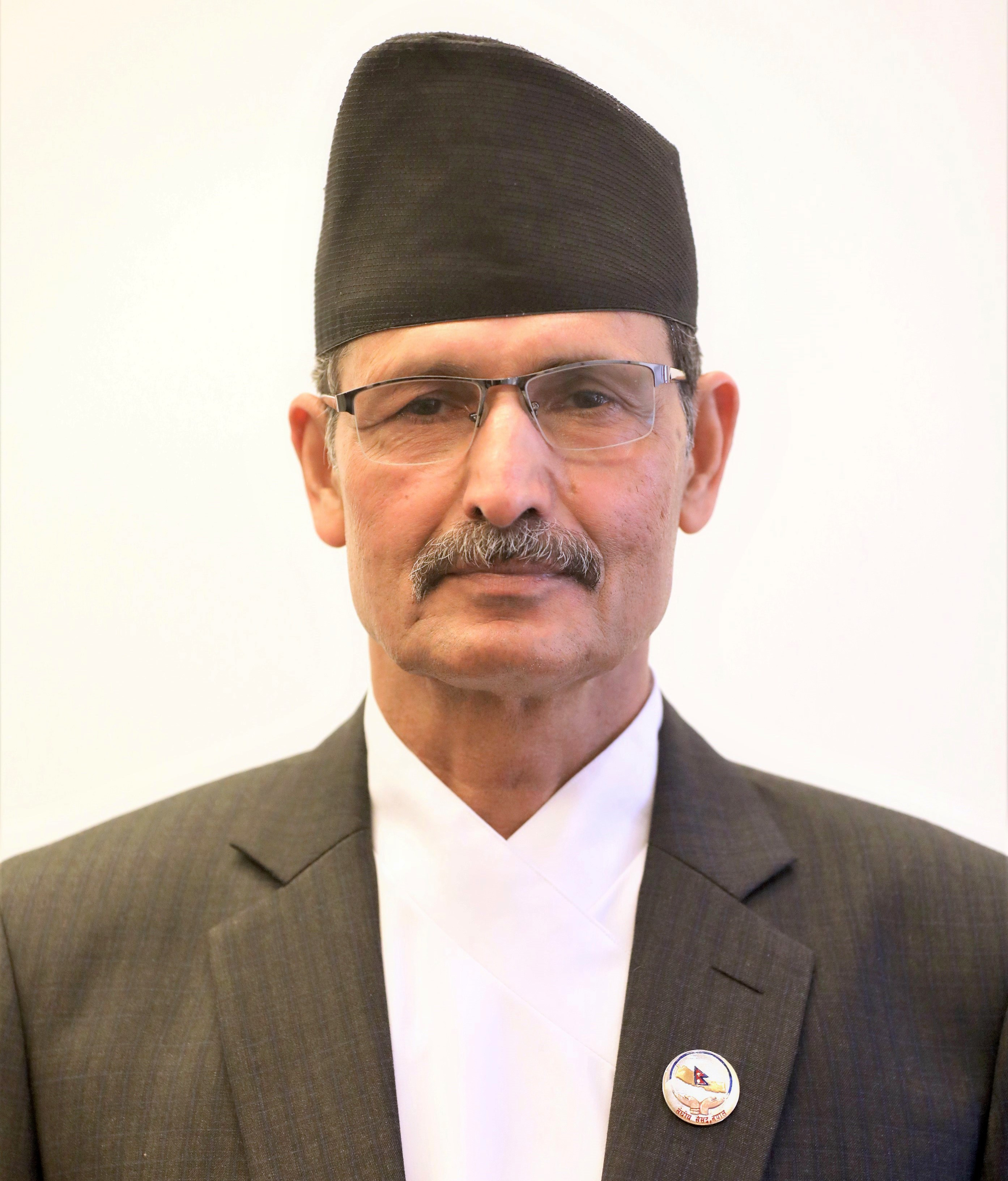

7th Speaker of the Pratinidhi Sabha
- In office 27 January 2020 – 25 September 2022
- President: Bidya Devi Bhandari
- Prime Minister: K. P. Sharma Oli; Sher Bahadur Deuba
- Deputy: Pushpa Bhusal (Gautam)
- Preceded by: Krishna Bahadur Mahara
- Succeeded by: Dev Raj Ghimire

Minister for Forests and Soil Conservation
- In office October 2015 – July 2016
- President: Bidya Devi Bhandari
- Prime Minister: K. P. Sharma Oli
- Preceded by: Mahesh Acharya
- Succeeded by: Shankar Bhandari

Minister for Information and Communications
- In office May 2011 – July 2011
- President: Ram Baran Yadav
- Prime Minister: Jhala Nath Khanal
- Preceded by: Krishna Bahadur Mahara
- Succeeded by: Jaya Prakash Gupta

Member of the House of Representatives
- In office 4 March 2018 – 18 September 2022
- Preceded by: Mohan Bahadur Basnet (as member of the Legislature Parliament)
- Succeeded by: Madhav Sapkota
- Constituency: Sindhupalchok 1

Member of the Constituent Assembly / Legislature Parliament
- In office 28 May 2008 – 14 October 2017
- Preceded by: Subas Karmacharya (as member of the House of Representatives)
- Succeeded by: Sher Bahadur Tamang (as member of the House of Representatives)
- Constituency: Sindhupalchok 2

Personal details
- Born: 7 March 1958 (age 68) Kubhinde, Sindhupalchok District, Nepal
- Party: CPN (Maoist Centre) (1994-2018, 2021-present)
- Other political affiliations: Nepal Communist Party (NCP) (2018–2021); CPN (Unity Centre) (1990-1994); CPN (Fourth Convention) (before 1990)
- Spouse: Tara Devi Sapkota
- Parents: Dhanpati Sapkota (father); Tilmaya Sapkota (mother)
- Education: Tribhuvan University

Agni Prasad Sapkota (Nepali: अग्निप्रसाद सापकोटा; born 7 March 1958) is a Nepalese politician and former speaker of the House of Representatives. He was elected speaker unopposed on 26 January 2020, after the previous speaker, Krishna Bahadur Mahara, resigned over allegations of attempted sexual assault.

Sapkota previously served as a minister in the cabinets of prime ministers Jhala Nath Khanal and KP Sharma Oli.

== Early political career ==
Sapkota started his early political life as a student activist in 1975. He registered as a general member of the Communist Party of Nepal (Fourth Convention) in 1978 and served as the founding secretary of the Sindhupalchok district chapter of the party in 1980. He became a full-time political activist in 1991, resigning from the post of headmaster of a high school. He filed his candidacy for the House of Representatives in the 1991 elections, but was unable to get on the ballot. Sapkota became a central committee member of the Communist Party of Nepal (Maoist), led by Pushpa Kamal Dahal, in 1995, after the party split from the Communist Party of Nepal (Unity Centre).

=== Maoist insurrection ===
When the CPN (Maoist) decided to initiate an armed struggle, he went underground in 1996 and continuously led the movement. He led several party committees and commanded troops of the PLA during the 10-year-long people's war. He was elected politburo member from the party's second national conference held in February 2001. He was also elected a central member of the 41-member United Revolutionary People's Council, a parallel state administration exercised by the Maoists, announced in November 2001. Sapkota, along with Krishna Bahadur Mahara and Top Bahadur Rayamajhi, were members of a dialogue team setup by the Maoists to hold peace talks with the government in 2001, which was unsuccessful in finding a middle ground after three rounds of meetings.

== Murder case of Arjun Lama ==
Sapkota has been alleged for the murder of Arjun Lama in 2005. Lama was abducted by maoists on 19 April 2005. Lama's wife tried to file a police report against maoists including Agni Sapkota, but the police refused to register fearing reprisals by maoists. Eventually, a writ was filed in Supreme Court and the court ordered Kavre Police to register the murder case on 11 August 2008.

== Parliamentary career ==
After the end of the Maoist insurrection, Sapkota was elected to the Constituent Assembly in April 2008 which the Maoists won in a landslide. He was reelected in November 2013, and thus served two terms as a member of the Constituent Assembly from Sindhupalchok–2. He served as a standing committee member of the CPN (Maoist Centre) and was a spokesperson of the party, and was in-charge of the publicity and education department of the party.

He has served twice as a minister—first as the Minister for Information and Communication from May to July 2011, and later as the Minister for Forests and Soil Conversation from October 2015 to July 2016. Despite his very short term as Minister for Information and Communication, a frequency policy was formulated under his lead and a frequency distribution system was established. He also ensured budget allocation for different facilities to journalists including life insurance and capacity building training of journalists as a part of the role of the government for promotion and development of the free press. During his tenure as Minister for Forests and Soil Conversation, Sapkota visited China on the invitation of the Chinese Minister for State Forestry Administration in January 2016, where in a meeting with his Chinese counterpart, China sought for two pairs of one-horned rhinoceros. He proceeded with the proposal of handing over the pair of rhinos, and in July 2016, the cabinet officially decided to gift two pairs of the endangered animal to China.

He was a member of the House of Representatives from Sindhupalchok–1, having been elected in the general election held in December 2017. After then-speaker Krishna Bahadur Mahara resigned in the wake of allegations of sexual assault and attempted rape of a parliamentary staffer, Sapkota was elected speaker unopposed on 26 January 2020 after his candidacy was put forth by the ruling Nepal Communist Party, and was administered the oath of office the next day by president Bidya Devi Bhandari.

== Electoral history ==
Sapkota was elected to the first Constituent Assembly in 2008 from Sindhupalchok–2 with a margin of over 20,000 votes than his next closest opponent. He was reelected in 2013 from the same constituency, but with a heavily reduced majority of just 650 votes. For the 2017 federal polls, the left alliance, consisting of the Communist Party of Nepal (Unified Marxist–Leninist) and Communist Party of Nepal (Maoist Centre) nominated him as a common candidate for Sindhupalchok–1, and he successfully unseated Nepali Congress' Mohan Bahadur Basnet, who was then serving as the Minister of Information and Communications, winning by over 10,000 votes. Only the top two candidates are shown below.

2008 Constituent Assembly election

Sindhupalchok–2

Party	Candidate	Votes	Status
UCPN (Maoist)	Agni Prasad Sapkota	30,175	Elected
CPN (Unified Marxist–Leninist)	Subas Karmacharya	10,063	Lost

2013 Constituent Assembly election

Sindhupalchok–2

Party	Candidate	Votes	Status
UCPN (Maoist)	Agni Prasad Sapkota	12,808	Elected
CPN (Unified Marxist–Leninist)	Subas Karmacharya	12,158	Lost

2017 House of Representatives election

Sindhupalchok–1

Party	Candidate	Votes	Status
CPN (Maoist Centre)	Agni Prasad Sapkota	40,504	Elected
Nepali Congress	Mohan Bahadur Basnet	29,795	Lost

== Personal life ==
Sapkota was born in Kubhinde, Sindhupalchok in a low-middle class peasant family. He is married to Tara Devi and they have three sons. He completed his secondary school education from Krishna Ratna Ganga High School in Chautara.

A post-graduate from Tribhuvan University, Sapkota was a teacher for over 16 years before he formally joining full-time politics. He also served as the general secretary of the National Teachers Association.
