= Menchhayayem Rural Municipality =

Menchhayayem मेन्छयायेम गाउँपालिका
- Rural Municipality
- Location in Koshi Province Menchhayayem (Nepal)
- Coordinates: 27.22°N 87.5°E
- Province: Koshi Province
- District: Tehrathum
- Wards: 6
- Established: 10 March 2017

Government
  - Type: Rural Council
  - Chairperson: Mr. Yadav Khapung (NCP)
  - Vice-chairperson: Mrs. Gitadevi Timsina Gautam (NC)

Area
  - Total: 70.09 km^{2} (27.06 sq mi)

Population (2011)
  - Total: 807i
  - Density: 11.5/km^{2} (29.8/sq mi)
- Time zone: UTC+5:45 (Nepal Standard Time)
- Headquarter: Morahang
- Website: official website

Menchhayayem (Nepali: मेन्छयायेम गाउँपालिका) is a rural municipality (gaunpalika) out of four rural municipality located in Tehrathum District of Koshi Province of Nepal. There are a total of 6 municipalities in Tehrathum in which 2 are urban and 4 are rural.

According to Ministry of Federal Affairs and Local Developme Menchhayayem has an area of 70.09 square kilometres (27.06 mi^{2}) and the total population of the municipality is 8078 as of Census of Nepal 2011.

Morahang, Srijung and Paunthak which previously were all separate Village development committee merged to form this new local level body. Fulfilling the requirement of the new Constitution of Nepal 2015, Ministry of Federal Affairs and Local Development replaced all old VDCs and Municipalities into 753 new local level body (Municipality).

The rural municipality is divided into total 6 wards and the headquarter of this newly formed rural municipality is situated in Morahang.

== Demographics ==
At the time of the 2011 Nepal census, Menchhayayem Rural Municipality had a population of 8,078. Of these, 43.3% spoke Limbu, 41.8% Nepali, 7.6% Tamang, 2.4% Kulung, 2.2% Sherpa, 1.1% Gurung, 0.6% Rai, 0.5% Bahing and 0.5% other languages as their first language.

In terms of ethnicity/caste, 44.8% were Limbu, 17.6% Hill Brahmin, 11.3% Chhetri, 8.8% Tamang, 3.1% Damai/Dholi, 2.7% Sherpa, 2.4% Badi, 2.4% Kulung, 1.9% Kami, 1.8% Gurung, 1.2% Rai, 1.1% Gharti/Bhujel, 0.2% Sanyasi/Dasnami, 0.2% Sunuwar and 0.5% others.

In terms of religion, 46.3% were Kirati, 39.8% Hindu, 13.2% Buddhist, 0.6% Christian and 0.1% others.

In terms of literacy, 75.1% could read and write, 3.0% could only read and 21.9% could neither read nor write.
