= Bharat Prasad Parajuli =

Nepalese Politician

- भरतप्रसाद पराजुली

Member of Parliament, Pratinidhi Sabha
- Incumbent
- Assumed office 26 March 2026
- Preceded by: Madhav Sapkota
- Constituency: Sindhupalchok 1

Personal details
- Party: Rastriya Swatantra Party
- Education: Political Science (BA); Sociology (MA)
- Alma mater: Tribhuvan University
- Profession: Politician

Bharat Prasad Parajuli (Note: Nepali: भरतप्रसाद पराजुली) is a Nepalese politician serving as a member of parliament from the Rastriya Swatantra Party. He is the member of the 7th Pratinidhi Sabha elected from Sindhupalchok 1 constituency in 2026 Nepalese General Election securing 24,412 votes and defeating Madhav Sapkota of the Nepali Communist Party. He previously served as a central committee member of the Independent Power Producers' Association, Nepal (IPPAN). He holds Bachelor's in Political Science and Master's degree in Sociology from Tribhuvan University. Presently, he is the chairman of the 45-megawatt Brahmayani Hydropower Project under construction in Jugal Rural Municipality.
