= Ambung =

Place in Nepal

Aambung आम्बुङ
- Location in Nepal
- Coordinates: 27.19°N 87.51°E
- Country: Nepal
- Province: Province No. 1
- District: Terhathum District

Population (1991)
  - Total: 3,309
- Time zone: UTC+5:45 (Nepal Time)

Aambung is a market center in Myanglung Municipality in the Himalayas of Terhathum District in Province No. 1 of eastern Nepal. Formerly a Village Development Committee this place was merged to form the new municipality since 18 May 2014. At the time of the 1991 Nepal census it had a population of 3309 people living in 588 individual households.
