= Rimal (surname) =

रिमाल
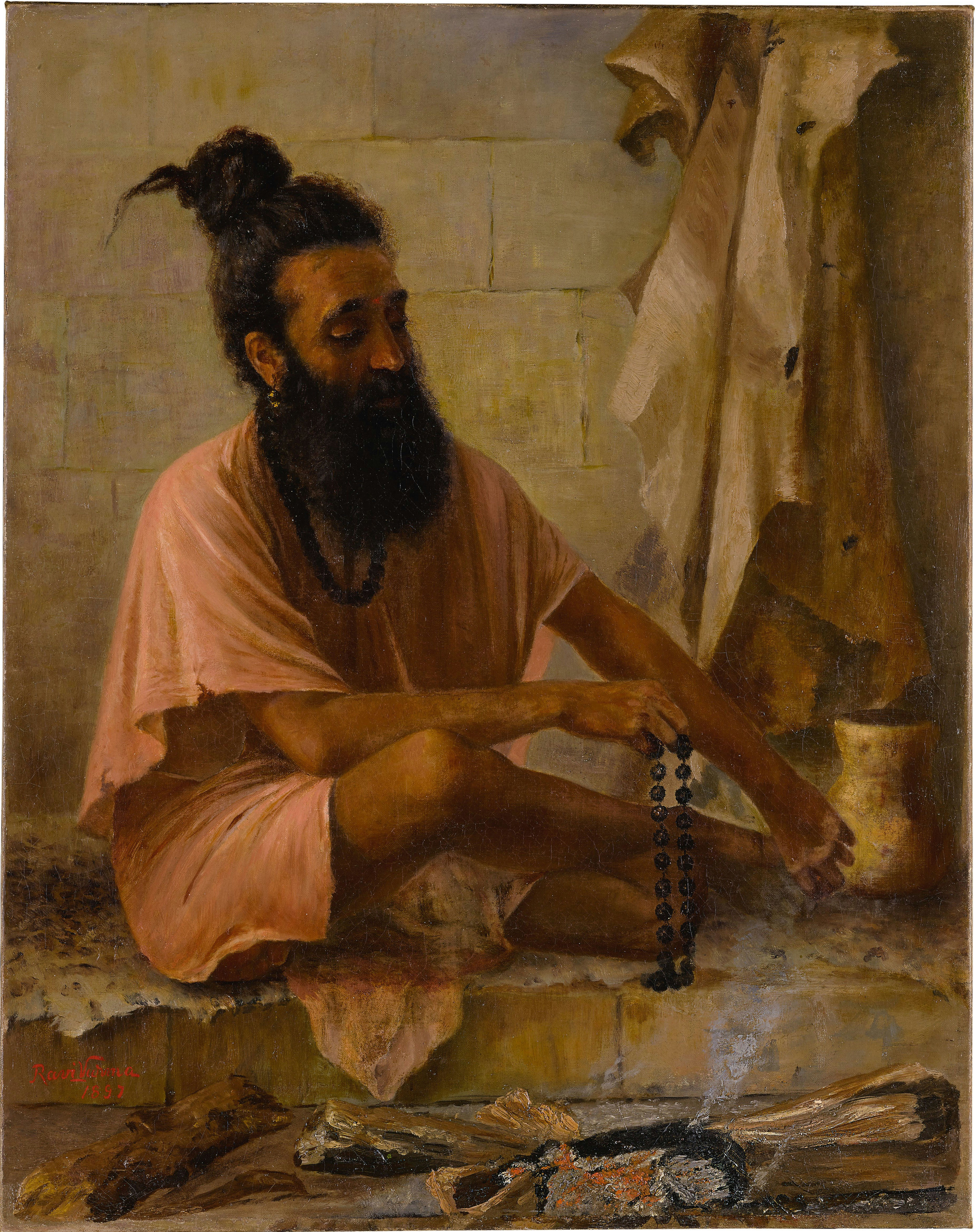

Regions with significant populations
- Nepal; India

Languages
- Nepali

Religion
- Hinduism

Rimal (Nepali: रिमाल) is a Nepali surname of Khas origin. Rimal people belong to the Bahun (Brahmin) caste and are a part of the Kaushik (Nepali: कौशिक) patriclan (gotra) of Nepali Khas-Brahmin community which forms a notable population in Nepal and India. They are sacred thread bearers (Tagadhari), twice-born Hindus and trace their origins to Indo-Aryan people.

== Notable people ==
- Rachana Rimal, Nepali singer.
- Gopal Prasad Rimal, Nepali poet.
- Hari Prasad Rimal, Nepali actor.
- Arbind Rimal, Nepali writer and intellectual.
- Hari Kumar Rimal, Nepalese long-distance runner.
- Shankar Nath Rimal, Nepalese civil engineer and architect.
- Pradeep Rimal, Nepalese film director, lyricist, screenwriter and cultural anthropologist.
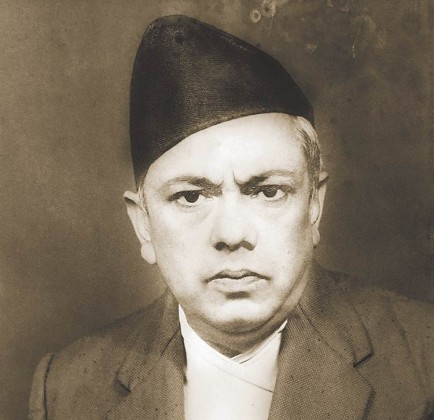
Gopal Prasad Rimal

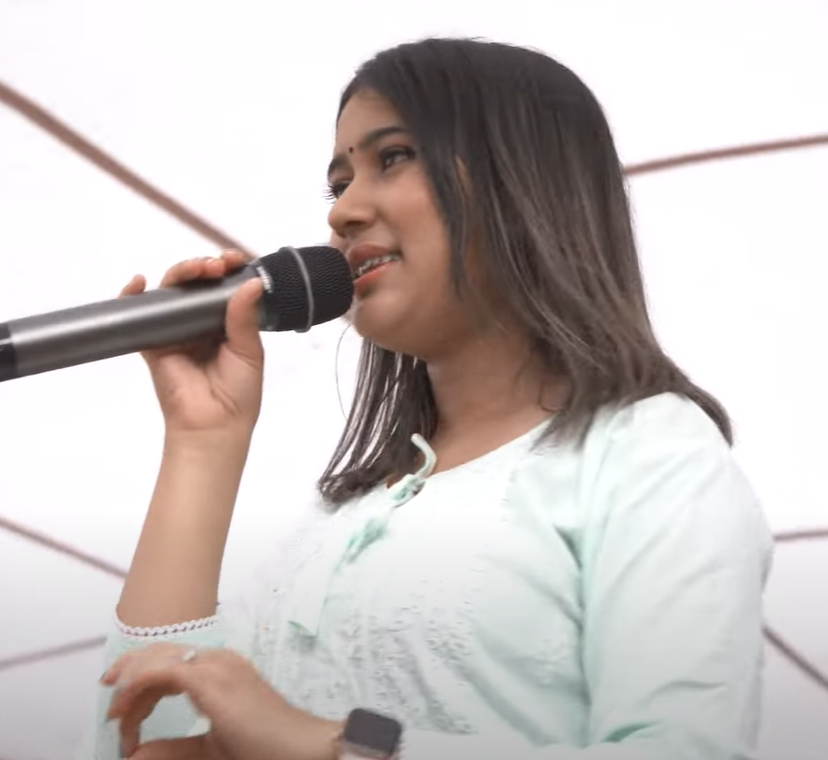
Rachana Rimal.
