= Phuwatapa Village =

Phuwatapa Village (Nepali: फुवातापा समुदाय) is an electoral subdivision or ward in Ishibu vdc of Terhathum District, Kosi Zone, in the eastern development region of Nepal. It had a population of about 500 people in 60 households, according to the census of 2011 conducted in Nepal. This village is situated on the lap of the Himalayas.
