= Sabla =

Sabla साव्ला
- Location in Nepal
- Coordinates: 27.16°N 87.53°E
- Country: Nepal
- Zone: Kosi Zone
- District: Terhathum District

Population (1991)
  - Total: 2,184
- Time zone: UTC+5:45 (Nepal Time)

Sabla is a market center in Myanglung Municipality in the Himalayas of Terhathum District in the Kosi Zone of eastern Nepal. Formerly a Village Development Committee this place was merged to form the new municipality since 18 May 2014. At the time of the 1991 Nepal census it had a population of 2184 people living in 389 individual households.
