= Piple =

Piple may refer to:

- Piple, Kosi, Nepal
- Piple, Narayani, Nepal
