= Simle =

Simle सिम्ले
- Village development committee
- Location in Nepal
- Coordinates: 27.15°N 87.62°E
- Country: Nepal
- Zone: Kosi Zone
- District: Terhathum District

Population (1991)
  - Total: 5,073
- Time zone: UTC+5:45 (Nepal Time)

Simle is a former village development committee in the Himalayas of Terhathum District in the Kosi Zone of eastern Nepal. At the time of the 1991 Nepal census it had a population of 5073 people living in 898 individual households.

On 10 March 2017, it was merged into the Phedap Rural Municipality after the existing VDCs were dissolved by the Ministry of Federal Affairs and General Administration and replaced with larger Rural Municipality administrative districts.
