= Radio Terhathum =

Radio station in Nepal

Radio Terhathum (Nepali: रेडियो तेहृथुम) 92.4 MHz is an FM radio station dedicated to the service of peoples resided in community of Myanglung, Terhathum District of Kosi Zone in eastern Nepal. They play Nepali music, host community and arts programs, and read news stories for the purpose of "the upliftment of various marginalized communities...to raise public awareness through various media such as radio, television, newspapers, online, etc., to assist in collecting, distributing, publishing, publishing and disseminating news."

The radio station has short wave transmission power– when it was first created it could transmit only to limited areas of the district, but it is now transmitting its services in an approximately 2 to 3 miles radius of the Kosi zone in the eastern development region of Nepal. It serves the Myanglung residents and people from remote areas within this area. The station is delivering its service to a coverage of up to 400,000 people. This radio transmits its various programs in different scheduled times. In 2014 it added 1 MHz so that it is now 92.4MHz. The station is now owned privately.

== Programmings ==
When it was first created, Radio Terathum was a best wishes or good-will program transmitted by quite new journalists. It was an experiment to see whether the broadcast successfully covered or and was of interest to the district. Since then, various kinds of programmes are available to air on the scheduled times. Beginning at 5:00 am NPT, the broadcast runs until 10:00 pm with time slots for global, national, and community news, prayer, and a daily horoscope.

== Main journalists ==
- Naresh Dhugana (Sub-station manager)
- Regina Khadka (Program Manager)
- Deepak Khanal (News assistant)
- Ranju Khativada (Event host/news announcer)
- Chandrakala Limvu (Program presenter)
- Rohita Magar (Entrepreneur)
- Pooja Majhi (Program presenter)
- Laxmi Narayan Mishra (Program director)
- Mahendra Prasad Kafle (Chairman and Manager)
- Goma Rasaili (Program Manager)
- Rashan Shrestha (Technical chief)
- Rohit Shrestha (Entrepreneur)
- Asmita Subedi (Program Director and Administration)
- Samjhana Tamang (Program presenter)
- Sirjana Tamang (News reader)
- Dikendra Varal (Program Officer/Technical)

== External sources ==
- Official website
