= Tamfula =

Tamphula ताम्फुला
- Location in Nepal
- Coordinates: 27.11°N 87.58°E
- Country: Nepal
- Zone: Kosi Zone
- District: Terhathum District

Population (1991)
  - Total: 2,000
- Time zone: UTC+5:45 (Nepal Time)

Tamphula is a market center in Myanglung Municipality in the Himalayas of Terhathum District in the Kosi Zone of eastern Nepal. Formerly a Village Development Committee this place was merged to form the new municipality since 18 May 2014. At the time of the 1991 Nepal census it had a population of 2000 people living in 388 individual households.
