= Singha Devi Middle Secondary School, Terathum =

School in Nepal

Singha Devi Middle Secondary School, Terathum Nepali: सिहं देवि पाथ॔मिक विधालय

Information
- Principal: Mr. Ram Prasad Phombo

Shree Singha Devi Middle Secondary School (Nepali: सिहं देवि पाथ॔मिक विधालय) is a community service dedicated school operated under the government of Nepal and the Ministry of Education. It is situated in Ward No. 8, Ishibu VDC of Tehrathum District, Nepal. The school recently added three levels and has been made a complete lower secondary school with 8 grades in total. The current principal for this school is Mr. Ram Prasad Phombo, and the former Principal was Mr. Durga Prasad Bhetwal. This school serves students from surrounding villages.

== List of Teachers ==
- Mr. Ram Prasad Phombo (principal)
- Mr. Dal Bahadur Thapa
- Mr. Kul Bahadur Limbu

== Management Committee ==
The School Management Committee runs the school with the help of Mr. Jay Bahadur Samamphe, the chairperson for this school. The former chairperson was Mr. Ganesh Niraula; a local resident from Ward No. 8, Layeba. The election system has the authority to choose the chairperson and the elected chairperson remains in office for one year.
