= Kubhinde =

Kubhinde may refer to the following places in Nepal:

- Kubhinde, Bagmati
- Kubhinde, Khotang
- Kubhinde, Rapti
