= Jirikhimti =

Jirikhimti जिरिखिम्ति
- Location in Nepal
- Coordinates: 27.17°N 87.49°E
- Country: Nepal
- Zone: Kosi Zone
- District: Terhathum District

Population (1991)
  - Total: 2,682
- Time zone: UTC+5:45 (Nepal Time)
- Postal code: 57102
- Area code: 026

Jirikhimti is a market center in Myanglung Municipality in the Himalayas of Terhathum District in the Kosi Zone of eastern Nepal. Jirikhimti Bazar is the junction of three village development committee; 6, 7 and 9 Formerly a Village Development Committee, it was merged to form a new municipality on 18 May 2014.

== Demographics ==
At the time of the 1991 Nepal census it had a population of 2,682 people living in 509 individual households.

== Geography and climate ==
The climate is generally cold.

== Education ==
Academic institutes include Evergreen English. Jirikhimti has one campus of agriculture.
