= Batase, Terhathum =

Batase (Nepali: बतासे) is a small village in the Terhathum District, of Province No. 1 in Nepal, situated in the Himalayan Mountains. To the west side of the village is a large hill covered by a thick forest. The people of the village keep livestock for their personal use and for sale. They also grow crops such as cardamom, maize, buckwheat, mustard, and peas, among others. The area is prominent in producing several drugs such as marijuana, hashish, and cannabis.

== Population ==
According to the census of 2011, Batase had a population of about 400 people in 40 households Most often the young men of the village leave the village for employment in other countries.

The region is occupied by people of the Karki castes, who make up the majority of the population. Some Karki families have lived in the village for many decades, and it is thought that the Karki population dates back 3 to 4 centuries.

== Geography and climate ==
Since Batase is situated in the Himalaya region at an elevation of about 3,000 metres above sea level, its climate is cold.

== See also ==
- Ishibu
- Tehrathum district
