= Rachana Rimal =

Nepalese singer

- रचना रिमाल
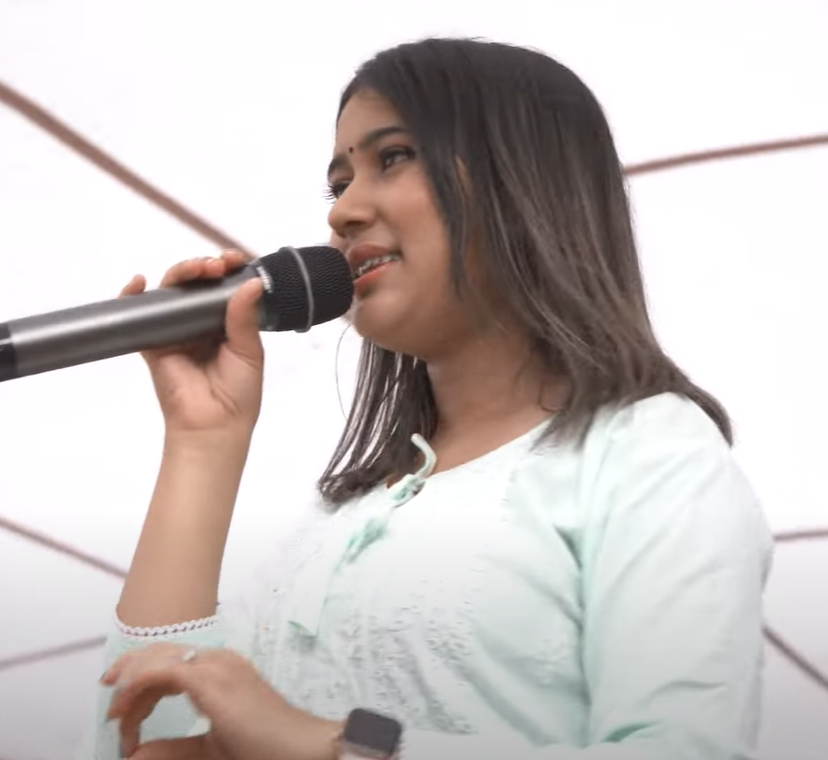
- Rimal singing in Nepal Commerce Campus (2022)
- Born: 15 August 2002 (age 24); Tehrathum, Nepal
- Occupation: Singer
- Years active: 2019–present
- Notable work: Photo Firimma, Unko Preeti, Paani Chhamkine, Chahanchhu.
- Musical career
- Genres: Semi-classical; popular; sentimental; folk
- Instruments: Vocals; harmonium

Rachana Rimal (Nepali: रचना रिमाल; born 15 August 2002), is a Nepalese singer. She is credited for singing over one thousand Nepali songs in less than two years, between the years 2020 and 2022. Came into recognition through singing reality show Nepal Idol in 2019, she has established herself as one of the leading singers in Nepal. Some of her songs include Photo Firimma, Unko Preeti, Paani Chhamkine, and Mineral Water.

== Early life ==
Rachana Rimal was born on 13 August 2002 in Tehrathum; her family moved to Jhapa when she was an infant. She has been singing since the earliest age she can remember. She used to sing Bhajan on local occasions in her hometown, Jhapa. She also competed in many regional competitions. The first competition she won was held in a Facebook group; one of her teachers recorded her performance and uploaded a video to the group. Rimal received the highest number of likes and won the competition receiving a harmonium as a prize. In another competition, she received five hundred rupees as prize money, which she has still not spent.

== Career ==
Rimal competed in the third season of singing reality show Nepal Idol in 2019. She placed in the top 8 position and set a record for being the highest-voted contestant three times in a row. She subsequently sang Photo Firimma, written and composed by Shishir Bhandari, a YouTuber and media personality and released in 2020. Since has also sung other songs such as Unko Preeti, Mineral Water, and Paani Chhamkine.

In early 2022, Rimal sang a remake version of Nabirse Timilai, originally sung by Anju Panta. The remake was not well received by some viewers and critics. Bipin Kiran, the song's author and lyricist, failed to acknowledge the original singer when the song was first released. Panta made a post regarding this matter on her social media account and claimed that the composer and arranger originally asked her to sing the remake version of this song, and she was also provided with a new arrangement of the song.

In 2022, Rimal posted a photo of herself attending a cricket match, and numerous news sources used the photo with a misleading title. This started a rumor that Rimal was invited to see a match by the Cricket Association of Nepal (CAN). She stated that she had purchased the ticket to attend the game and welcomed as a special guest after being recognized by CAN officials. There was also a rumor that CAN asked her for an explanation for her sudden arrival to watch a match without following proper protocols. Rimal and CAN denied this, calling it a mass media fabrication.

== Selected discography ==
Rimal has sung over one thousand songs; the list below represents only a few of her popular songs.

Year	Song	Lyricist(s)	Composer(s)	Ref(s)
2020	Rumala Chino	Basanta Sapkota	Basanta Sapkota	
2020	Photo Firimma	Shishir Bhandari	Shishir Bhandari	
2020	Mineral Water	Bhim Bista	Bhim Bista	
2020	Unko Preeti	Madhav Prasad Ghimire	Narayan Rayamajhi	
2020	Aayaun Cheli	Ghanashyam Oli	Dipak Sharma	
2020	Hamro Maya Charkiyeko	Bimal Dangi	Bimal Dangi	
2021	Paani Chhamkine	Samrat Chualagain	Samrat Chualagain	
2021	Bhana Saila	Ramesh Raj Bhattarai	Ramesh Raj Bhattarai	
2021	Yo Rato Gala	Deepak Sharma	Deepak Sharma	
2021	Chahanchhu	Manas Bikram Thapa, Manisha Khadka	Saroj Pokharel	
2021	Sunko Chandrama	Pushpa Acharya	Dipak Sharma	
2021	Aau Hami Sangai Basaun	Yashoda Mahat	Debesh Rai	
2021	Teejko Mahina Chha	DP Khanal	Nabin Karki	
2021	Harle Nikhar Lyauchha	Dhanendra Rasaily	Babul Giri	
2022	Hajur Musukkai	Suresh Adhikari	Suresh Adhikari	
2022	Nabirse Timilai	Bipin Kiran	Mahesh Khadka	
2022	Timle Soche Bhanda Dherai	B.B. Anuragee	B.B. Anuragee	
2022	Dhunge Dhara	Shiva Akheli	Shiva Akheli	
2023	Paisa Sapati	Badri Kumar Pangeni	Badri Kumar Pangeni	

== Awards ==
Year	Award	Category	Song	Result	Ref(s)
2021	National Entertainment Award	Best New Female Singer	Photo Firimma	Won	
