= Sankranti Bazar =

Sankranti Bazar सक्रान्ति Sankranti Bazaar
- Village development committee
- Location in Nepal
- Coordinates: 27.21°N 87.64°E
- Country: Nepal
- Zone: Kosi Zone
- District: Terhathum District

Population (1991)
  - Total: 3,266
- Time zone: UTC+5:45 (Nepal Time)
- Postal code: 57110

Sankranti Bazar is a village development committee in the Himalayas of Terhathum District in the Kosi Zone of eastern Nepal. At the time of the 1991 Nepal census it had a population of 3266 people living in 622 individual households. Once a thriving market town, By 2001 the village had declined because road construction had bypassed them and because of Maoist activity.
