= Morahang =

Morahang मोराहाङ
- Village development committee
- Location in Nepal
- Coordinates: 27.22°N 87.50°E
- Country: Nepal
- Zone: Kosi Zone
- District: Terhathum District

Population (2001)
  - Total: 4,064
- Time zone: UTC+5:45 (Nepal Time)
- Postal code: 57107
- Area code: 026

Morahang is a village development committee in the Himalayas of Terhathum District in the Kosi Zone of eastern Nepal. At the time of the 1991 Nepal census it had a population of 3679 people living in 699 individual households.

The majority of the people from this village come from Limbu background. In comparison, people from this area are well educated and have higher earning power. Alaichi (black cardamom) is one of the major cash crops. Apart from that majority of people are involved in some sort of foreign employment, anywhere from unskilled to highly skilled jobs. Employment as British Army is probably the most popular and high earning job on an average. Khapung (Limbu) are major residents of this area.
