= Solma =

Solma सोल्मा
- Village development committee
- Location in Nepal
- Coordinates: 27.13°N 87.48°E
- Country: Nepal
- Zone: Kosi Zone
- District: Terhathum District

Population (1991)
  - Total: 4,093
- Time zone: UTC+5:45 (Nepal Time)

Solma is a village development committee in the Himalayas of Terhathum District in the Kosi Zone of eastern Nepal. At the time of the 1991 Nepal census it had a population of 4093 people living in 717 individual households. Solma is a Village Development Committee (VDC) lies on western part of Tehrathum District. The main ethnicity distribution of this VDC is Limbu (1190), Bramans (873), Kchhetri (663), Magar (381), Gurungs(287), Newar (166), Tamang (43) Kami (119)and Dam/Darji (100), Bhujel/Gharti (47).
