= Sudap =

- Village development committee
- Location in Nepal
- Coordinates: 27.08°N 87.47°E
- Country: Nepal
- Zone: Kosi Zone
- District: Terhathum District

Population (1991)
  - Total: 3,143
- Time zone: UTC+5:45 (Nepal Time)
- Postal code: 57105
- Area code: 026

Sudap is a village development committee in the Himalayas of Terhathum District in the Kosi Zone of eastern Nepal. At the time of the 1991 Nepal census it had a population of 3143 people living in 582 individual households.
