= Mohan Bahadur Basnet =

Nepalese politician (born 1958)

- मोहन बहादुर बस्नेत

Minister of Health and Population
- In office 3 May 2023 – 4 March 2024
- President: Ram Chandra Poudel
- Prime Minister: Pushpa Kamal Dahal
- Preceded by: Padam Giri
- Succeeded by: Upendra Yadav

Minister of Information and Communications
- In office 26 July 2017 – 15 February 2018
- President: Bidhya Devi Bhandari
- Prime Minister: Sher Bahadur Deuba
- Preceded by: Ram Karki
- Succeeded by: Gokul Prasad Baskota

Minister of State for Health
- In office 18 October 2001 – 4 October 2002
- Monarch: Gyanendra
- Prime Minister: Sher Bahadur Deuba
- Minister: Sharat Singh Bhandari

Member of the Parliament, Pratinidhi Sabha
- In office 22 December 2022 – 12 September 2025
- Preceded by: Sher Bahadur Tamang
- Succeeded by: Yubraj Dulal
- Constituency: Sindhupalchok 2
- In office May 1999 – May 2002
- Preceded by: Amrit Kumar Bohora
- Succeeded by: Raj Kumar Shrestha (as MCA)
- Constituency: Sindhupalchok-1

Member of the Constituent Assembly / Legislature Parliament
- In office 21 January 2014 – 14 October 2017
- Preceded by: Raj Kumar Shrestha
- Succeeded by: Agni Prasad Sapkota (as MP)
- Constituency: Sindhupalchok 1

Personal details
- Born: 9 September 1958 (age 68) Sindhupalchok, Nepal
- Party: Nepali Congress

Mohan Bahadur Basnet (Nepali: मोहन बहादुर बस्नेत) is a Nepalese politician. He served as a member of the Pratinidhi Sabha and the 2nd Constituent Assembly from Sindhupalchok-1, having been elected in the 1999 and 2013 elections, representing Nepali Congress.

He served as the Minister for Information and Communication from 2017–2018 in the fourth Deuba cabinet, having previously served as the State Minister of Health under Deuba from 2001–2002.

== Legal issues ==
In May 2025, Mohan Bahadur Basnet was named in a corruption case filed by the Commission for the Investigation of Abuse of Authority (CIAA) concerning the procurement of the Teramox telecom monitoring system. The CIAA alleged that the project was advanced without proper evaluation, resulting in a loss of Rs 3.22 billion. Following the charges, Basnet was automatically suspended from Parliament in accordance with the Constitution of Nepal.

In June 2025, Basnet was granted bail by the Special Court in Kathmandu for NPR 25 lakh despite the ongoing investigation into the Teramux case.
