= Hamarjung =

Hamarjung हमरजुङ
- Village development committee
- Location in Nepal
- Coordinates: 27.04°N 87.45°E
- Country: Nepal
- Zone: Kosi Zone
- District: Terhathum District

Population (1991)
  - Total: 2,956
- Time zone: UTC+5:45 (Nepal Time)
- Postal code: 57106
- Area code: 026

Hamarjung is a village development committee in the Himalayas of Terhathum District in the Kosi Zone of eastern Nepal. As of the 2021 Nepal census, Hamarjung has a population of 2176, spread throughout 498 households.
