= Hawaku =

Coordinates: 27.0400°N 87.4500°E

Hawaku ह्वाकु
- Village development committee
- Interactive map of Hawaku
- Country: Nepal
- Zone: Kosi Zone
- District: Terhathum District

Population (1991)
  - Total: 3,390
- Time zone: UTC+5:45 (Nepal Time)

Hawaku is a village development committee in the Himalayas of Terhathum District in the Kosi Zone of eastern Nepal. At the time of the 1991 Nepal census it had a population of 3390 people living in 589 individual households. A higher secondary school is the only school of Hwaku. It is bordered with IWa, Sakranti, Nighuradin (Taplejung) and Amarpur (Panchthar). The Tamor river lies to the east of Hwaku making it an area suitable for cultivation.
