= Chhate Dhunga =

Village development committee in Province No. 1, Nepal

Chhate Dhunga छातेढुङ्गा
- Village development committee
- Location in Nepal
- Coordinates: 27.216°N 87.750°E
- Country: Nepal
- Province: Province No. 1
- District: Terhathum District

Population (1991)
  - Total: 3,591
- Time zone: UTC+5:45 (Nepal Time)

Chhate Dhunga is a village development committee in the Himalayas of Terhathum District in Province No. 1 of eastern Nepal. At the time of the 1991 Nepal census it had a population of 3591 people living in 604 individual households.
