= Paunthak =

Paunthak पौंठाक
- Village development committee
- Location in Nepal
- Coordinates: 27.24°N 87.55°E
- Country: Nepal
- Zone: Kosi Zone
- District: Terhathum District

Population (1991)
  - Total: 2,405
- Time zone: UTC+5:45 (Nepal Time)

Paunthak is a village development committee in the Himalayas of Terhathum District in the Kosi Zone of eastern Nepal. At the time of the 1991 Nepal census it had a population of 2,405 people living in 430 individual households.
