= Thulo Sirubari =

Thulo Sirubari ठूलो सिरुवारी
- City
- Location in Nepal
- Coordinates: 27.73°N 85.71°E
- Country: Nepal
- Zone: Bagmati Zone
- District: Sindhupalchok District

Population (1991)
  - Total: 5,602
  - Religions: Hindu
- Time zone: UTC+5:45 (Nepal Time)

Thulo Sirubari is a village and market center of Chautara Sangachowkgadi Municipality in Sindhupalchok District in the Bagmati Zone of central Nepal. The formerly Village Development Committee was merged to the new municipality in 2017. At the time of the 1991 Nepal census it had a population of 5602 and had 998 houses in it. house hold survey in 2023, population of 5556 and 1173 house in it.
