= Phakchamara =

Phakchamara फाक्चामारा
- Village development committee
- Location in Nepal
- Coordinates: 27.03°N 87.51°E
- Country: Nepal
- Zone: Koshi Zone
- District: Terhathum District

Population (1991)
  - Total: 3,041
- Time zone: UTC+5:45 (Nepal Time)

Phakchamara is a village development committee in the Himalayas of Terhathum District in the Kosi Zone of eastern Nepal. At the time of the 1991 Nepal census it had a population of 3041. Brahmin, Chhetri, and Limbu are the main cast of this VDC. Naween Shikshya Sadan Higher Secondary School is the oldest School of this region as well as of this VDC. Several philanthropists contribute to the educational development of this VDC through this school. Mr. Krishna Prasad Dahal was a long time "Head sir" of this school and significantly contributed to the local society for uplifting the educational levels of numerous people of this region. "Niraula" and "Dahal" families contributions are tremendous for the development of this region and of this VDC. Currently, under new reformation of the political system in Nepal, it is included within "Chhathar Rural Municipality Ward No. 4". The Chhathar Rural Municipality, Ward No. 4 chair after the election on 2017 is Santosh Tigela from Communist Party of Nepal. The only road that connects this region to Teria and accessible municipalities like Dhankuta and Dharan is by "Sindhuwa Sukrabare Road". The construction of this 8 km road has been started in 1986 but not pitched and completed yet due to corruption and idiot leaders. "Sukrabare bazaar" is the major business hub of this region. Buses and private vehicles are now run in this road 12 months after the graveling of the road in 2019. This is beautiful VDC with a pristine panorama of "KumbhaKarna Mountain" and a silver lining shine of Tamor River. Rhododendroen is everywhere mostly in the higher region. Water crises, foreign employment are the major problems. The Upper regions which are mostly wetland should be protected and initiate aforestation for the future of this VDC.
