= Piple, Tehrathum =

Coordinates: 27°8′N 87°31′E

Piple पिप्ले
- Interactive map of Piple
- Country: Nepal
- Zone: Kosi Zone
- District: Terhathum District
- Elevation: 1,000 m (3,300 ft)

Population (1991)
  - Total: 1,613
- Time zone: UTC+5:45 (Nepal Time)
- Area code: 026

Piple, Tehrathum is a market center in Myanglung Municipality in the Himalayas of Terhathum District, Kosi Zone of eastern Nepal. Formerly known as the Village Development Committee, it merged into the municipality on May 18, 2014.

== Demographics ==
At the time of the 1991 Nepal census, it had a population of 1,613 people residing in 285 individual households. Piple is one of the Village Development Committees located in Myamglumg.

== Geography ==
Villages bordering Piple include Bhandara, Korak, Manahari, and Kankada. Parsa National Park, home to critically endangered and threatened species including tigers and gaur, also borders Piple.
