= Madhav Sapkota =

Nepali politician

- माधव सापकोटा

Member of Parliament, Pratinidhi Sabha
- In office 24 December 2022 – 12 September 2025
- Preceded by: Agni Prasad Sapkota
- Succeeded by: Bharat Prasad Parajuli
- Constituency: Sindhupalchok 1

Personal details
- Born: 2 April 1981 (age 45) Sindhupalchok District
- Party: Communist Party of Nepal (Maoist Centre)

Madhav Sapkota is a Nepalese politician, belonging to the Communist Party of Nepal (Maoist Centre) currently serving as a member of the 2nd Federal Parliament of Nepal. In the 2022 Nepalese general election, he was elected from the Sindhupalchok 1 (constituency).
