= Angdim =

Angdim आङदिम
- Village development committee
- Location in Nepal
- Coordinates: 27.07°N 87.42°E
- Country: Nepal
- Province: Province No. 1
- District: Terhathum District

Population (1991)
  - Total: 1,940
- Time zone: UTC+5:45 (Nepal Time)

Angdim is a village development committee in the Himalayas of Terhathum District in Province No. 1 of eastern Nepal. At the time of the 1991 Nepal census it had a population of 1940 people living in 358 individual households.
