= Syaule Bazar =

Syaule Bazar स्याउले बजार
- City
- Location in Nepal
- Coordinates: 27.83°N 85.70°E
- Country: Nepal
- Zone: Bagmati Zone
- District: Sindhupalchok District

Population (1991)
  - Total: 3,875
  - Religions: Hindu
- Time zone: UTC+5:45 (Nepal Time)

Syaule Bazar is a village and market center of Chautara Sangachowkgadi Municipality in Sindhupalchok District in the Bagmati Zone of central Nepal. The former Village Development Committee was merged to the new municipality in 2017. At the time of the 1991 Nepal census it had a population of 3875 and had 726 houses in the village.
