= Phulek =

Phulek फुलेक
- Village development committee
- Location in Nepal
- Coordinates: 27.11°N 87.41°E
- Country: Nepal
- Zone: Kosi Zone
- District: Terhathum District

Population (1991)
  - Total: 1,566
- Time zone: UTC+5:45 (Nepal Time)

Phulek is a village development committee in the Himalayas of Terhathum District in the Kosi Zone of eastern Nepal. At the time of the 1991 Nepal census it had a population of 1566 people living in 269 individual households.
