= Sangachok =

Sangachok साँगाचोक
- City
- Location in Nepal
- Coordinates: 27.69°N 85.71°E
- Country: Nepal
- Zone: Bagmati Zone
- District: Sindhupalchok District

Population (2013)
  - Total: 10,791
  - Religions: Hindu
- Time zone: UTC+5:45 (Nepal Time)

Sangachok is a village and market center of Chautara Sangachokgadi Municipality in Sindhupalchok District in the Bagmati Zone of central Nepal. The formerly Village Development Committee was merged to form the new municipality on 2017. At the time of the 2013 Nepal census it had a population of 10,791 and had 1,828 houses in the village.

== 2015 Nepal earthquake ==
The town was severely affected by the earthquake on 25 April 2015. In the aftermath of the earthquake people went to the toilet everywhere due to the lack of organised toilets. The town suffered from poor sanitation, threat of an epidemic, and hunger. The natural spring that supplied the town with water was destroyed leaving residents to rely on existing stores of water and leading to water shortages. There were inadequate medical supplies in the town. The nearest hospital was about 25 miles away. People slept outdoors in a makeshift tent community. 183 people in the village were confirmed dead. Local officials avoided locals out of fear of their anger.
