= Yambunera =

2020 Nepali book by Bina Theeng Tamang

- Cover page of the book
- Author: Bina Theeng
- Original title: याम्बुनेर
- Language: Nepali
- Genre: Short stories
- Set in: In and around Kathmandu
- Published: 2020
- Publisher: Phoenix Books
- Publication date: August 26, 2020
- Publication place: Nepal
- Media type: Print (Paperback)
- Pages: 173
- ISBN: 9789937705516
- Preceded by: Rato Ghar

Yambunera (Nepali: याम्बुनेर) is a 2020 short stories collection by Bina Theeng. It was published on August 26, 2020 by Phoenix Books. It is the third book of the author. The book consists of 13 stories.

== Synopsis ==
Yambu is the name of Kathmandu in Tamang language. Yambunera means the area around Kathmandu valley. The stories in the book are centered in and around Kathmandu valley. The stories are about people who have been marginalized and been neglected by the state.

The stories included in the book are:

S.N	Title	Description
1.	Aani Pema	Aani Pema (Nun Pema) depicts the life of a nun named Aani in a Buddhist monastery (Gompa). The struggle between desire and celibacy of Pema forms the main theme of the story.
2.	Seiko-5	Seiko-5 is the story of a girl is who assaualted in exchange of a Seiko-5 watch. The story depicts the helplessness of a girl in a patriarchal society.
3.	Yambunera	Yambunera is the story of a woman who business of home-made liquor (raksi) is affected by the ban from the local authority.
4.	Bhagwan Nivas	Bhagwan Nivas (Shelter of god) depicts the dreams of a youth who has gone abroad for employment to build a house.
5.	Aayam	Aayam is the story of a young widow.
6.	Ghadi Phool	Ghadi Phool (Watch-flower) is the story depicting challenges of an inter-caste marriage in Nepali society.
7.	Driver Ka Aankha	Driver ka Aankha (The eyes of a driver) depicts the story of an ordinary truck driver.
8.	Ganga Ram ko Cycle	Ganga Ram ko Cycle (Ganga Ram's cycle) is the story of a Madhesi guy called Ganga Ram. The story show how Madhesi people are treated as a second-rate citizen in Nepal.
9.	Gande Jhar	Gande Jhar (Smelly Grass) is the story of a student turned Maoist rebel Dipesh Thapa.
10.	Aaiti Maya	Aaiti Maya is an ordinary rural housewife. The story depicts the story of Aaiti Maya and her suscpision on her husband.
11.	Junedo	Junedo is a story of a girl from Hindu Brahmin family who elopes with a Muslim guy.
12.	Bad Bhale	Bad Bhale (Bad Cockrel) is a feminist story of rebel against the system of men marrying multiple women if his previous wife is unable to provide him with a son. The story shows the hypocrisy of Nepalese patriarchal society.
13.	Sifal Ko Phero	Siphal ko Phero deals with the story of girl trafficking.

== Theme ==
The grief, suffering, suffering and struggle of the marginalized Tamang community is the main theme of this book. The book also shows various cultural evils of Nepalese society such as caste system, discrimination based on religion and class and patriarchy.

== Reception ==
The book received positive responses from the critics. Gyanu Adhikari of Shilapatra magazine praised the stories for being "grounded in social realism". Gauri Tamu praised the book as "breaking the so-called standard of Nepalese literature". Prakash Thamsuhang of Naya Patrika Daily called it as a "solid masterpiece".

== See also ==
- Kumari Prashnaharu
- Nathiya
- Dumero
