= Sanusiruwari =

Place in Bagmati Zone, Nepal

Sano Siruwari सानो सिरुवारी
- Location in Nepal
- Coordinates: 27.76°N 85.71°E
- Country: Nepal
- Zone: Bagmati Zone
- District: Sindhupalchok District

Population (2001)
  - Total: 3,825
  - Religions: Hindu
- Time zone: UTC+5:45 (Nepal Time)

Sano Siruwari is a village and market center of Chautara Municipality in Sindhupalchok District in the Bagmati Zone of central Nepal. The formerly Village Development Committee was merged to form the new municipality on 18 May 2014. At the time of the 1991 Nepal census it had a population of 3320 and had 577 houses in the village.
