= Narayan Rayamajhi =

Nepali composer and lyricist (born 1961)

Narayan Rayamajhi नारायण रायमाझी
- नारायण रायमाझी
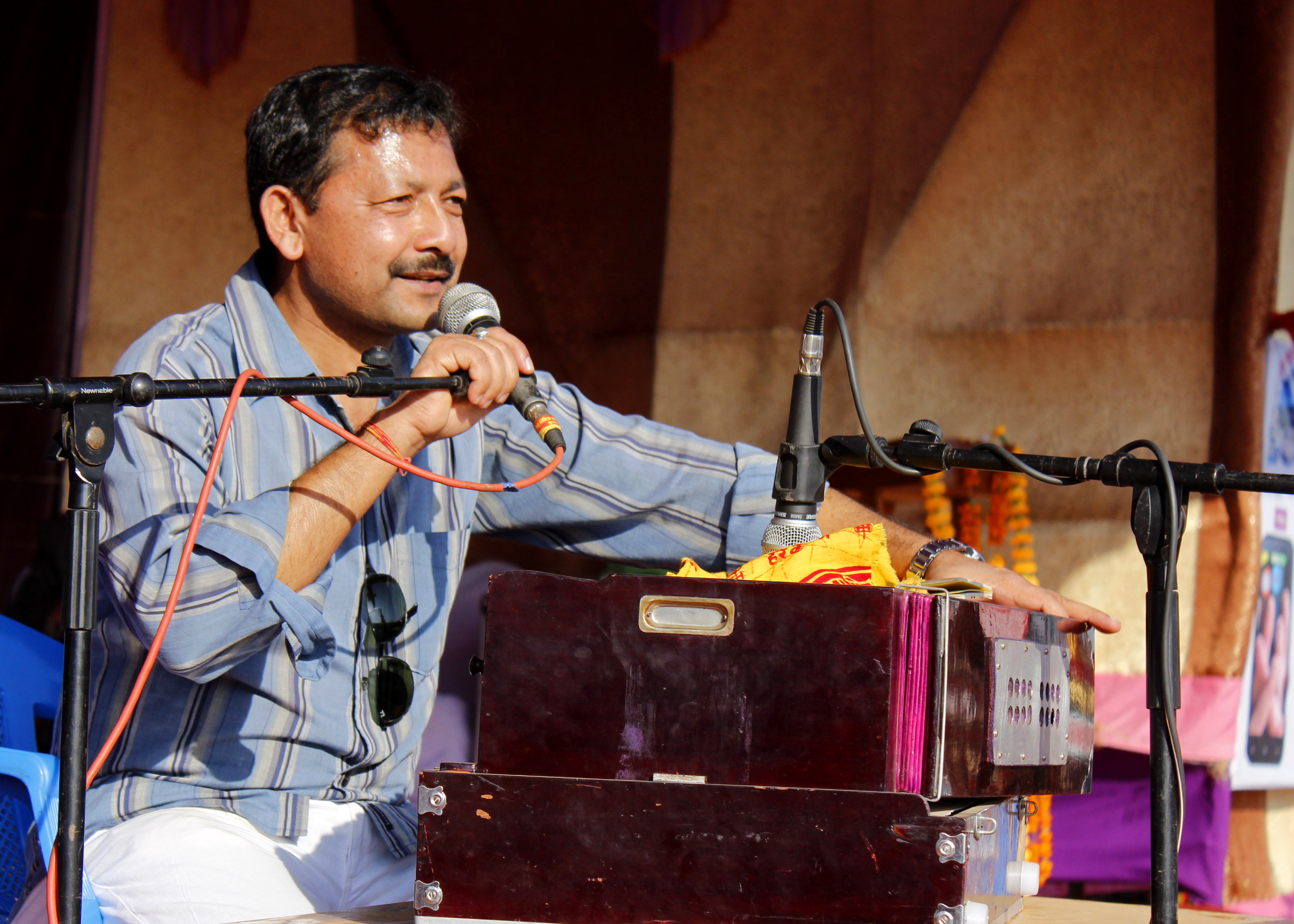
- Narayan Rayamajhi at Palpa Tradefare
- Born: Narayan Rayamajhi; 25 April 1961 (age 65); Jhadewa −05, Palpa District
- Citizenship: Nepal
- Education: Bachelor in Arts (B.A.) from Tribhuvan University
- Occupations: Singer composer writer director producer lyricist music director
- Years active: 1985–present
- Known for: Narayan Rayamajhi
- Notable work: Nepali Movie Gorkha Paltan and Pardeshi
- Spouse: Chanda Rayamajhi
- Children: Alina Rayamajhi; Saru Rayamajhi; Paras Rayamajhi
- Parents: Surya Bahadur Rayamajhi (father); Krishna Kumari Rayamajhi (mother)

Narayan Rayamajhi (Nepali: नारायण रायमाझी; born 25 April 1961) is a Nepali composer, lyricist, feature-film script writer, film director, and producer. He has steadily excelled as a singer and he has made a significant contribution to promote Nepali music industry. He has written more than fourteen dozen folk songs, more than six dozen modern songs, two dozens soap-opera songs, three musical plays, two documentaries and has he directed three movies Gorkha Paltan, Pardeshi and Pardeshi 2.

== Early life ==
Popular Singer and music composer Narayan Rayamajhi was born on 25 April 1961 in Jhadewa −05, Palpa District Nepal to Suryabhadur Rayamajhi and Krishna kumari Rayamajhi. He had a keen interest in musical field from his childhood. He embraced himself with many musical and cultural possessions. He learned to play musical instruments on his own. Later on his early 20s he moved to Kathmandu to initiate his Nepali music career, obtained Bachelor in Arts (B.A.) from Tribhuvan University and Diploma in Vocal from Prayag Sangeet Samiti, Allahabad India. Rayamajhi delegation to persuade his dream follows the foot step of his Late elder brother Laxman Rayamajhi. Rayamajhi has been an advisor of the Music Museum Nepal for some 20 years and he has continuously supported and aided the museum in many sphere during the time by filming, directing and editing he was a member of jury of international folk music film festival in 2012. He has played a vital role in promoting and protecting endangered Nepal Folk music.

== Personal life ==
Rayamajhi was married to Chanda Rayamajhi and have three children, Alina Rayamajhi, Saru Rayamajhi and Paras Rayamajhi. The late Laxman Rayamajhi, his elder brother has played significant role in his life, two younger sisters Shakuntala Rayamajhi, Chadani Rayamajhi, followed by his two younger brothers Jeevan Rayamajhi and Durga Rayamajhi who are also active in Nepali Music Industry.

== Employment records ==
1. (From 1985 to 2007) Music Coordinator Officer, Radio Nepal, Ministry of Information and Communication
2. (From 1987 to Present) Director, Reema Recording Studio, Kathmandu Metropolitan City −11, Thapathali, Kathmandu
3. Director – Television Program- Hamro Riti Hamrai Saskriti (Our ritual and Our culture), Nepal Television

== Singing career ==
Rayamajhi's songs are extensively popular in the Nepalese community all around the world. His two modern songs albums Priya and Preeti including More than sixty modern songs recorded in Radio Nepal. Folk songs album Lahure ko Jindaki, Bala jovan, Dori furkale, Bhangang ka suseli, Sai, Malmal Pacheure, Belijai, Baisa dhalkinai lagyo, Chori ko juni, Deusi Vhailo, Dharo Dharma, Ralemai, Kargil, Joban Karja ma, Phool butte choli, Piratiko Dhoko, Rodhi ghar ko Ramjham, Saikai, Taxi motor car, Teej ko Ramjham was very prevalent in Nepali Folk Music Industry. He has deliberated and researched about the Nepalese typical cultural song and dance Sorathi. He also runs one of the best music company in Nepal called "Reema Digital Recording Studio". Narayan Rayamajhi is known as inspirational figure to the new generation who wants to follow his footstep in Nepali Music Industry. He has come a long way to create a history and expertise in traditional folk musical and cultural sector.

== Filmography as director ==
Year	Film	Role	Cast
2010	Gorkha Paltan	Director; Producer; Script writer	Prashant Tamang; Ranjita Gurung; Soniya k.c Vinay lama Gopal Bhutani; Giri Prasad Pun; Sunil Thapa
2016	Pardeshi	Producer director Script writer	Prashant Tamang; Rajni kc Keshab bhattarai Sushil pokhrel Giri pun Ramchandra koherala Tara Sharma
2023	Pardeshi 2	Producer director Script writer	Prakash Saput; Keki Adhikari; Dilip Rayamajhi; Barsha Siwakoti; Prashant Tamang

He has also directed some musical dramas which achieved huge success.

- Kargil (Which is based on gorkhali soldiers story)
- Aaradhya Rodhan (Violence against women)

== Working as a Judge ==
Year	TV Show / Songs Competition	Organized by
1997	Second National folk Music	The Reukai Nepal
1998	Duet song Competition	Sopal Society Kathmandu
2001	Folk song Conference	Community Radio Madhanpokhara
2002	Western Regional Dual Song Competition	Royal Nepal Academy
2002	National Duet Folk Song Competition	Royal Nepal Academy
2002	Dual song Competition among Dohori Restaurants	National Dual Song Academy Nepal
2003	Open National Duet Song Competition	Dhorpatan Sport Club
2005	Tuborg Dual Folk Song Competition	Tuborg Nepal
2007	Duet song Competition	Radio Nepal
2007	Dual folk Song Competition	Radio Nepal
2010	Tele award 2010	Television Art workers Forum of Nepal
2012	International musical film festival	Music museum of Nepal
2016	2nd National Inter Dohori Saanjh Competition	Rastriya Lok Tatha Dohori Geet Pratisthan Nepal

== Visit / Performance of Cultural Program ==
1. United States, international folk festival, 2009 and 2010
2. Japan (at Least 15 programs over major cities-1993)
3. Finland (Helsinki cultural musical show-1990)
4. Russia (cultural program-1990)
5. China, cultural show-1993 and film show in Hong Kong, 2011
6. Qatar (musical show-1999)
7. Thailand (cultural program-2009)
8. France (International folk festival-2011)
9. Israel (film show and cultural program-2011)
10. Spain (International folk festival-2007)
11. Korea (musical performance-2007)
12. Singapore (cultural show-2007)
13. Italy (International folk festival-2011)
14. Germany (International folk festival-2007)
15. Poland (International folk festival-2007 and 2012)
16. Belgium (International folk festival and film show-2011)
17. Netherlands, International folk festival-2011)
18. Taiwan (International folk festival, 2014
19. United Arab Emirates, cultural program, 2016
20. Oman (film show and cultural program-2016)
21. India- at least six programs over major cities of the country
22. Nepal – almost all major parts and cities of the country
