= Irkhu =

Irkhu इर्खु
- City
- Location in Nepal
- Coordinates: 27.74°N 85.74°E
- Country: Nepal
- Zone: Bagmati Zone
- District: Sindhupalchok District

Population (1991)
  - Total: 2,628
  - Religions: Hindu
- Time zone: UTC+5:45 (Nepal Time)

Irkhu is a village and market center of Chautara Sangachowkgadi Municipality in Sindhupalchok District in the Bagmati Zone of central Nepal. The formerly Village Development Committee was merged to the new Municipality in 2017. At the time of the 1991 Nepal census it had a population of 2628 and had 480 houses in the village.
