= Thoklung =

Thoklung थोक्लुङ
- Village development committee
- Location in Nepal
- Coordinates: 27.16°N 87.65°E
- Country: Nepal
- Zone: Kosi Zone
- District: Terhathum District

Government

Population (1991)
  - Total: 3,010
- Time zone: UTC+5:45 (Nepal Time)

Thoklung is a village development committee in the Himalayas of Terhathum District in the Kosi Zone of eastern Nepal. At the time of the 1991 Nepal census it had a population of 3010 people living in 506 individual households.
