= Kadambas, Nepal =

Kadambas कदमबास
- City
- Location in Nepal
- Coordinates: 27.72°N 85.76°E
- Country: Nepal
- Zone: Bagmati Zone
- District: Sindhupalchok District

Population (1991)
  - Total: 3,133
  - Religions: Hindu
- Time zone: UTC+5:45 (Nepal Time)
- Postal code: +977
- Area code: 11
- Website: mikhelsom.blogspot.com

Kadambas is a village and market center of Chautara Sangachowkgadi Municipality in Sindhupalchok District in the Bagmati Zone of central Nepal. The former Village Development Committee was merged to the new municipality in 2017. At the time of the 1991 Nepal census it had a population of 3133 and had 571 houses in the village.
