= Dangpa, Nepal =

Dangpa दाङपा
- Village development committee
- Location in Nepal
- Coordinates: 27.097°N 87.437°E
- Country: Nepal
- Province: Province No. 1
- District: Terhathum District

Population (1991)
  - Total: 2,382
- Time zone: UTC+5:45 (Nepal Time)

Dangpa is a village development committee in the Himalayas of Terhathum District in Province No. 1 of eastern Nepal. At the time of the 1991 Nepal census it had a population of 2382 people living in 428 individual households.
