= Basantapur, Kapilvastu =

Basantapur बसन्तपुर
- Village development committee
- Location in Nepal
- Coordinates: 27.50°N 83.05°E
- Country: Nepal
- Zone: Lumbini Zone
- District: Kapilvastu District

Population (1991)
  - Total: 2,352
- Time zone: UTC+5:45 (Nepal Time)

Basantapur is a village in the Kapilvastu District in the Lumbini Zone of southern Nepal. At the time of the 1991 Nepal census it had a population of 2352.

== History ==
Archaeological excavations have shown evidence of ancient civilisations located in Basantapur.

In April 2015, a 7.8 magnitude earthquake struck Nepal near the capital Kathmandu. In Basantapur, several buildings were damaged and 1 person was killed.
