= Basantapur, Tehrathum =

Basantapur बसन्तपुर
- Municipality
- Location in Nepal
- Coordinates: 27.14°N 87.43°E
- Country: Nepal
- Province: Koshi Province
- District: Terhathum District

Government
  - Type: Nagarpalika
  - Mayor: Arjun Mabuhang
- Elevation: 2,200 m (7,200 ft)

Population (1991)
  - Total: 4,014
- Time zone: UTC+5:45 (Nepal Time)
- Postal code: 57104
- Area code: 026

Basantapur is a city located in the Himalayan Terhathum District of Koshi Province, Nepal. It is the main city of Laligurans Municipality and is known for its beautiful rhododendron forests, snow-covered peaks during the winter season, and stunning natural scenery. Basantapur is often referred to as the "gate of capital city of rhododendrons" due to its abundance of these vibrant flowers.

== Geography ==
Basantapur is located at an altitude of approximately 2,200 meters (7,200 feet) above sea level, making it one of the highest cities in Nepal. It is situated on the eastern side of the Himalayan range and is surrounded by beautiful mountain peaks, including Kanchenjunga, the third highest mountain in the world. Basantapur is also home to the Mai Pokhari lake, which is a popular tourist destination and an important source of water for the region.

== Climate ==
Basantapur has a subtropical highland climate, with cool summers and chilly winters. During the winter season, the city experiences heavy snowfall, which attracts many tourists from around the world. The spring season is especially beautiful in Basantapur, with the rhododendrons in full bloom and the surrounding mountains covered in a blanket of colorful flowers.

== Tourism ==
Basantapur is a tourist destination noted for its natural scenery, rhododendron forests, and snow-covered peaks. The city is also home to many trekking trails, including the Kanchenjunga trek, which passes through some of the most beautiful landscapes in Nepal.

In addition to its natural beauty, Basantapur also has many cultural attractions, including several temples and monasteries. The Thulung Dudhkoshi Hydro Power Project, one of the largest hydroelectric power plants in Nepal, is also located in Basantapur.

== Economy ==
The economy of Basantapur is primarily based on agriculture and tourism. The region is known for its production of rice, maize, and other crops. Tourism also plays an important role in the local economy, with many hotels, guesthouses, and restaurants catering to visitors.

== Transportation ==
Basantapur is accessible by road and air. The nearest airport is the Biratnagar Airport, which is located approximately 6 hours away by road. The city is also connected to the national highway network, which provides access to other cities and towns in the region.

In conclusion, Basantapur is a city located in the Himalayan Therathum district of Koshi Province, Nepal. It is known for its natural scenery, rhododendron forests, and snow-covered peaks, as well as its cultural attractions and thriving tourism industry.
