= Tripurasundari Rural Municipality, Sindhupalchok =

Rural municipality in Bagmati province, Nepal

Tripurasundari (Nepali: त्रिपुरासुन्दरी गाउँपालिका) is a rural municipality located in Sindhupalchok District of Bagmati Province of Nepal.
