= Samdu =

Samdu सम्दु
- Village development committee
- Location in Nepal
- Coordinates: 27.25°N 87.58°E
- Country: Nepal
- Zone: Kosi Zone
- District: Terhathum District

Population (1991)
  - Total: 2,683
- Time zone: UTC+5:45 (Nepal Time)

Samdu is a village development committee in the Himalayas of Terhathum District in the Kosi Zone of eastern Nepal. At the time of the 1991 Nepal census it had a population of 2683 people living in 431 individual households. The village is now a guest house village where travellers spend a night on their way to the Everest Trek.
