= Batase, Kavrepalanchok =

Batase बतासे
- Village development committee
- Location in Nepal
- Coordinates: 27.81°N 85.74°E
- Country: Nepal
- Province: Bagmati Province
- District: Kabhrepalanchok District

Population (1991)
  - Total: 1,985
- Time zone: UTC+5:45 (Nepal Time)

Batase is a village development committee in Kabhrepalanchok District in the Bagmati Zone of central Nepal. At the time of the 1991 Nepal census it had a population of 1,985 and had 337 houses in it.
