= Lisankhu Pakhar Rural Municipality =

Rural municipality in Bagmati province, Nepal

Lisankhu Pakhar (Nepali: लिसंखु पाखर गाउँपालिका) is a rural municipality located in Sindhupalchok District of Bagmati Province of Nepal.
