= Batase, Sindhupalchok =

Batase बतासे
- City
- Location in Nepal
- Coordinates: 27.81°N 85.74°E
- Country: Nepal
- Province: Bagmati Province
- District: Sindhupalchok District

Population (1991)
  - Total: 4,764
  - Religions: Hindu
- Time zone: UTC+5:45 (Nepal Time)

Batase is a village and market center of Chautara Sangachowkgadi Municipality in Sindhupalchok District in Bagmati Province of central Nepal. The formerly Village Development Committee was merged to the new Municipality in 2017. At the time of the 1991 Nepal census it had a population of 4764 and had 1002 houses in the village.
