= Basantapur, Tanahun =

Basantapur, Gandaki बसन्तपुर
- Village development committee
- Location in Nepal Basantapur, Gandaki (Nepal)
- Coordinates: 28.07°N 84.40°E
- Country: Nepal
- Zone: Gandaki Zone
- District: Tanahu District

Population (2011)
  - Total: 3,415
- Time zone: UTC+5:45 (Nepal Time)

Basantapur, Gandaki is a village development committee in Tanahu District in the Gandaki Zone of central Nepal. At the time of the 2011 Nepal census it had a population of 3415 people living in 868 individual households.
