= Basantapur, Rupandehi =

Basantapur, Rupandehi बसन्तपुर
- Village development committee
- Location in Nepal
- Coordinates: 27.51°N 83.49°E
- Country: Nepal
- Province: Lumbini Province
- District: Rupandehi District

Population (1991)
  - Total: 4,472
- Time zone: UTC+5:45 (Nepal Time)

Basantapur, Rupandehi is a village development committee in Rupandehi District in Lumbini Province of southern Nepal. At the time of the 1991 Nepal census it had a population of 4472 people living in 664 individual households.
