= Bina Theeng Tamang =

Nepalese writer (born 1980)

Bina Maya Theeng Lama
- बिना थिङ तामाङ
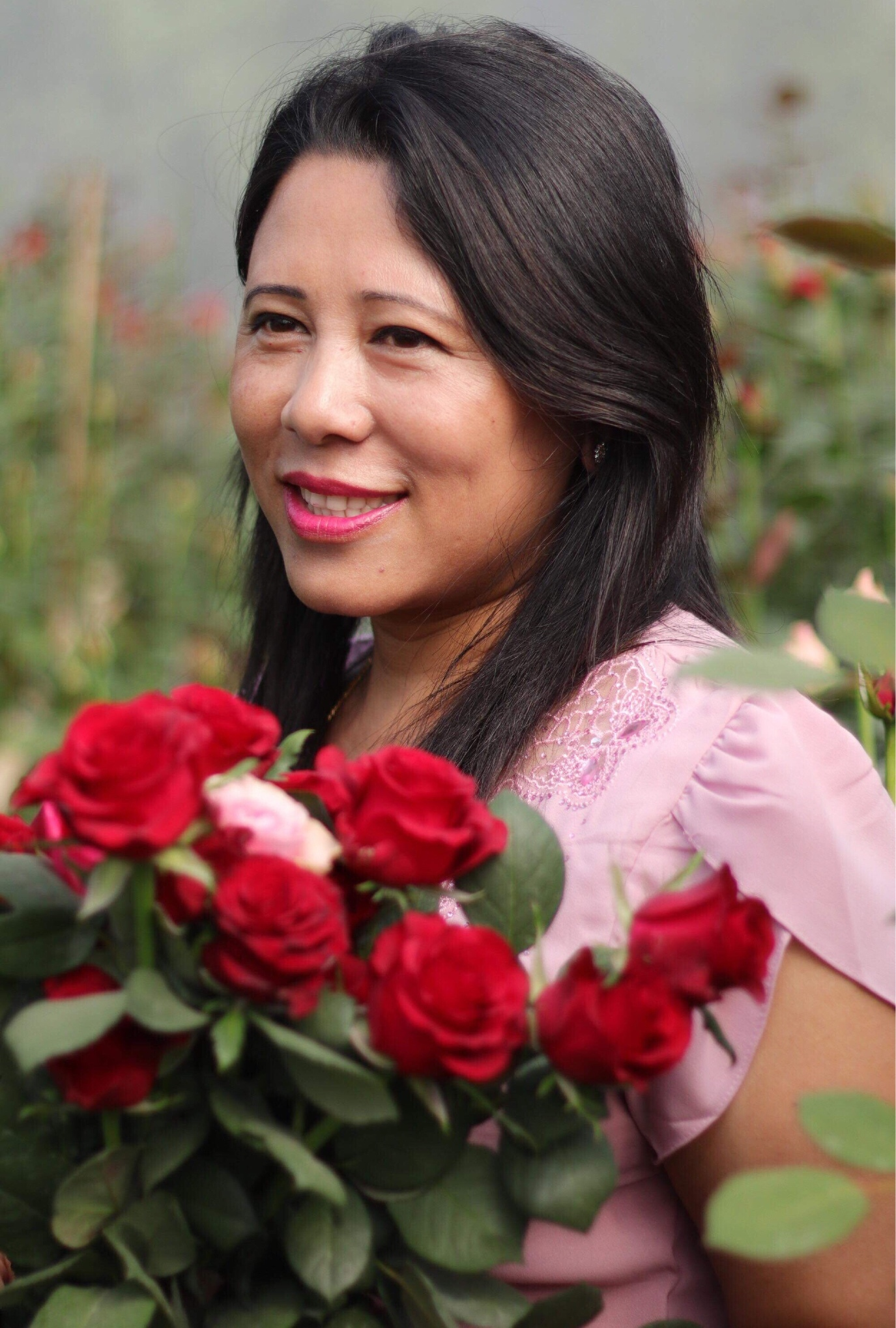
- Born: Bina Maya Theeng Lama; 26 August 1980 (age 45); Hetauda, Makwanpur, Nepal
- Education: M. Ed.
- Alma mater: Tribhuvan University
- Occupations: Writer, teacher
- Notable work: Chhuki, Rato Ghar, Yambunera
- Awards: National Poem Competition

Bina Maya Theeng Lama (Nepali: बिना माया थिङ लामा) (born 26 August 1980), professionally known as Bina Theeng Tamang, is a Nepalese educator, writer, and poet from Kathmandu, Nepal. She is best known for her short stories and poems.

== Early life and education ==
Tamang was born on 26 August 1980 in Hetauda city of Makwanpur district in Nepal. Tamang did her schooling in Makwanpur from Shree Pragati Secondary School. She completed her graduation in Education from Kathmandu Shiksha Campus (affiliated to Tribhuvan University).

== Literary career ==
In 2013, Chhuki, a collection of her short stories was published by Sabdahar Creation Inc. In 2015, Rato Ghar, a collection of her poems was published by Biswo Nepali Sahitya Inc. Her anthology of poetry Rato Ghar was awarded the 2016 Sulav Tamang Wangmaya Puraskar, award by the Sulav Tamang Prativa Pratisthan. On 26 August 2020, she published her second short story collection titled Yambunera.

She is a pioneer poet advocating, in her poems, the voices of marginalized Janajatis, Madhesis and other minor groups those were suppressed during autocracy of Shah and Rana Regimes. She currently works as a teacher in Jaya Bhadrakali Basic School, of which she also serves as the Vice Principal.

== Published works ==
Tamang has published a poetry collection and two short story collections.

- Chhuki – Short story collection, published in 2013 (2069 BS)
- Rato Ghar – Poetry collection, published in 2015 (2072 BS)
- Yambunera – Short story collection, published on 26 August 2020

== Literary awards ==
Literary awards received by Tamang:

National Poem Competition

- First Prize (Organized by Shakti FM 103.4 Meghaherz, Hetauda) in 2070 BS (2013 CE)

International Poem Competition

- Third Prize (Organized by The White Zone Nepal), 2069 BS (2012 CE)

National Dishhome Barhakhari Story Competition

- First Prize (Organized by Baarakhari Books), 2076 BS (2019 CE)
