= Ishibu =

Village development committee in Nepal

Ishibu (Nepali: ईसिबु) is one of the 32 village development committees of Tehrathum District in Province No. 1 of Nepal. This village is to the north of the district headquarters at Myanglung. It had a population of 2846 in 616 households according to the census of 2011.

== Tourism ==
The area located between Ishibu and Samdu is most popular and well known for its natural panoramas. One of the most remarkable objects existing here is Hyatung waterfall which is known throughout Asia and the world.

== Literacy rate ==
This community was very disadvantaged and lagged behind in education over the past few years but after a gradual changes in improving the literacy rate from every sub-division number, the rate of literacy has been changing substantially throughout in villages.

For administrative purposes Ishibu is divided into nine wards. These are Phuwatapa, Layemba, Batase, Bhetwal Gau, Gairi toll, Talkharka, Jyamire, Eka number (Nepali: एक नँबर), and Naminta. The main occupation here is agricultural work; other occupations include police and Army service, teaching, and temporary voluntary work.

== Geography and climate ==
Ishibu has a moderate climate favorable in most areas for production of paddy, millet, wheat, cardamom, crops and various vegetables. It is a totally landlocked and hilly region.

== Development ==
The village has now been well equipped with transportation, drinking water, electricity, communication, education, and employment. A mid-hills highway (Nepali: मधय पहाडी राज माग॔) has been constructed through Ishibu which has brought many changes for the inhabitants. Education is provided by a 10+2 school, two lower secondary schools and three primary schools.

== See also ==
- Phuwatapa Village
