= Sentimental Music =

Painting by Arthur Dove

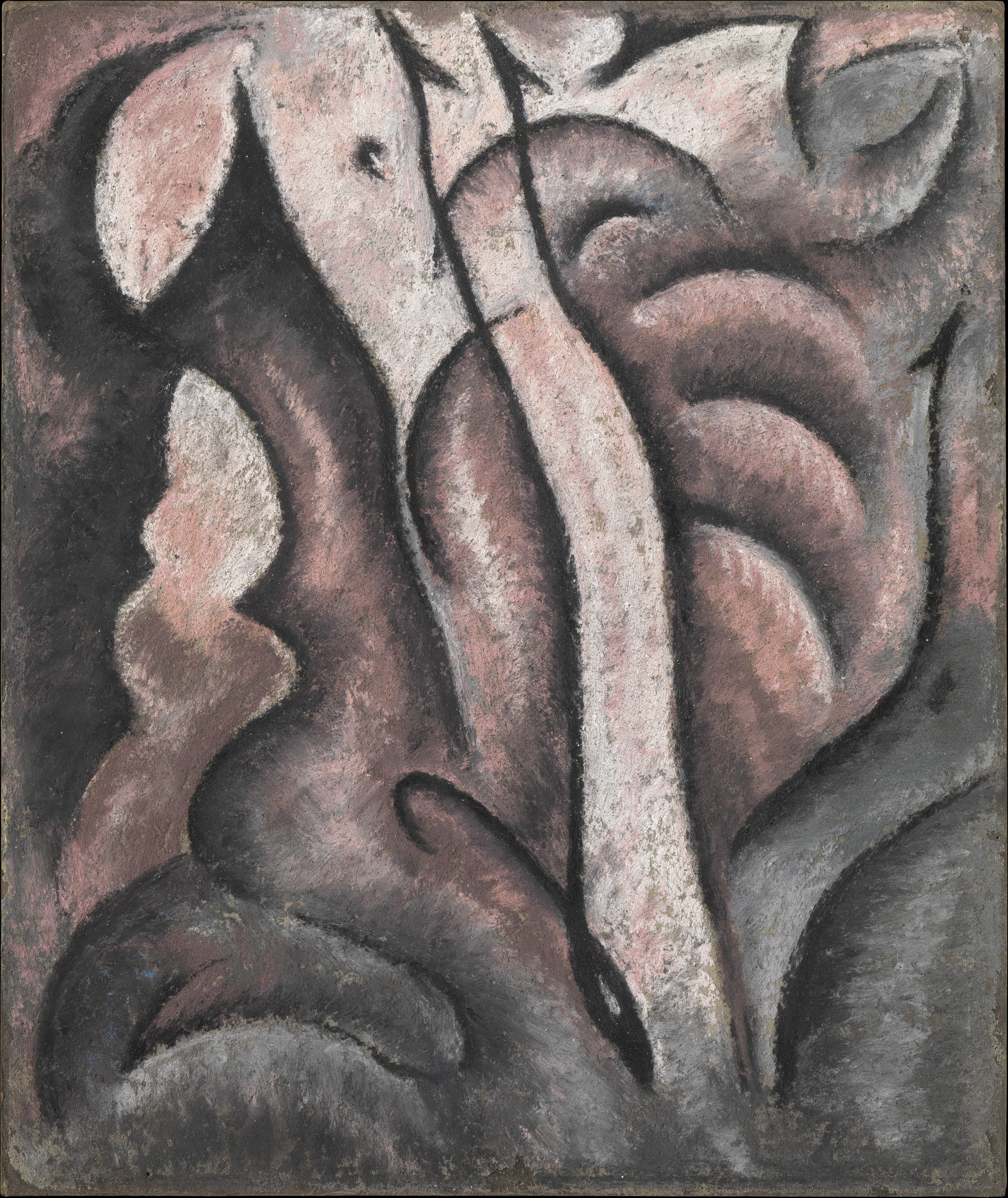
- Artist: Arthur Dove
- Year: c. 1913
- Dimensions: 54.9 cm (21.6 in) × 45.7 cm (18.0 in)
- Location: Metropolitan Museum of Art
- Accession: 49.70.77a, b

Sentimental Music is a circa 1913 painting by Arthur Dove. It is in the collection of the Metropolitan Museum of Art. It is not currently on display.

== Early history and creation ==
Dove's work has significant musical influence. He was interested in music contemporary to his time, in particular jazz improvisation and the work of Igor Stravinsky. It is a product of Dove's interest in synesthesia. He and his friend Georgia O'Keeffe "wanted to be able to interpret the spirit of sound into paint."

== Later history and display ==
New York. Whitney Museum of American Art. "Abstract Painting in America," February 12–March 22, 1935, no. 35 (as "oil").

New York. The Metropolitan Museum of Art. "Three Centuries of American Painting," April 9–October 17, 1965, unnum. checklist.

New York. The Metropolitan Museum of Art. "Arthur Dove/Helen Torr: Land and Water," February 14–June 14, 1998, no catalogue.

New York. The Metropolitan Museum of Art. "Stieglitz and His Artists: Matisse to O'Keeffe," October 13, 2011–January 2, 2012, no. 64.

== Description and interpretation ==
The work is an abstract depiction of musical instruments and the music that they create. Francine Prose described the painting as "sensual" and tells us that Dove found it "comparable to music" and "in 2/4 time".

== Influence ==
It is pastel on paperboard and considered part of the modernist movement.
