= Jugal Rural Municipality =

Rural municipality in Bagmati Province, Nepal

Jugal (Nepali: जुगल गाउँपालिका) is a rural municipality located in Sindhupalchok District of Bagmati Province of Nepal. There are seven wards, including Selang, Golche, Gumba, Pangtang, Baramchi, Hagam, and Yanglakot.
