= Kubhinde, Sindhupalchok =

Kubhinde कुभिण्डे
- City
- Location in Nepal
- Coordinates: 27.77°N 85.75°E
- Country: Nepal
- Zone: Bagmati Zone
- District: Sindhupalchok District

Population (1991)
  - Total: 2,772
  - Religions: Hindu
- Time zone: UTC+5:45 (Nepal Time)

Kubhinde is a village and market center of Chautara Municipality in Sindhupalchok District in the Bagmati Zone of central Nepal. The formerly Village Development Committee was merged to form the new municipality on 18 May 2014. At the time of the 1991 Nepal census it had a population of 2772 and had 547 houses in the village.
