= Chautara =

Chautara Sangachokgadhi Municipality
- Municipality
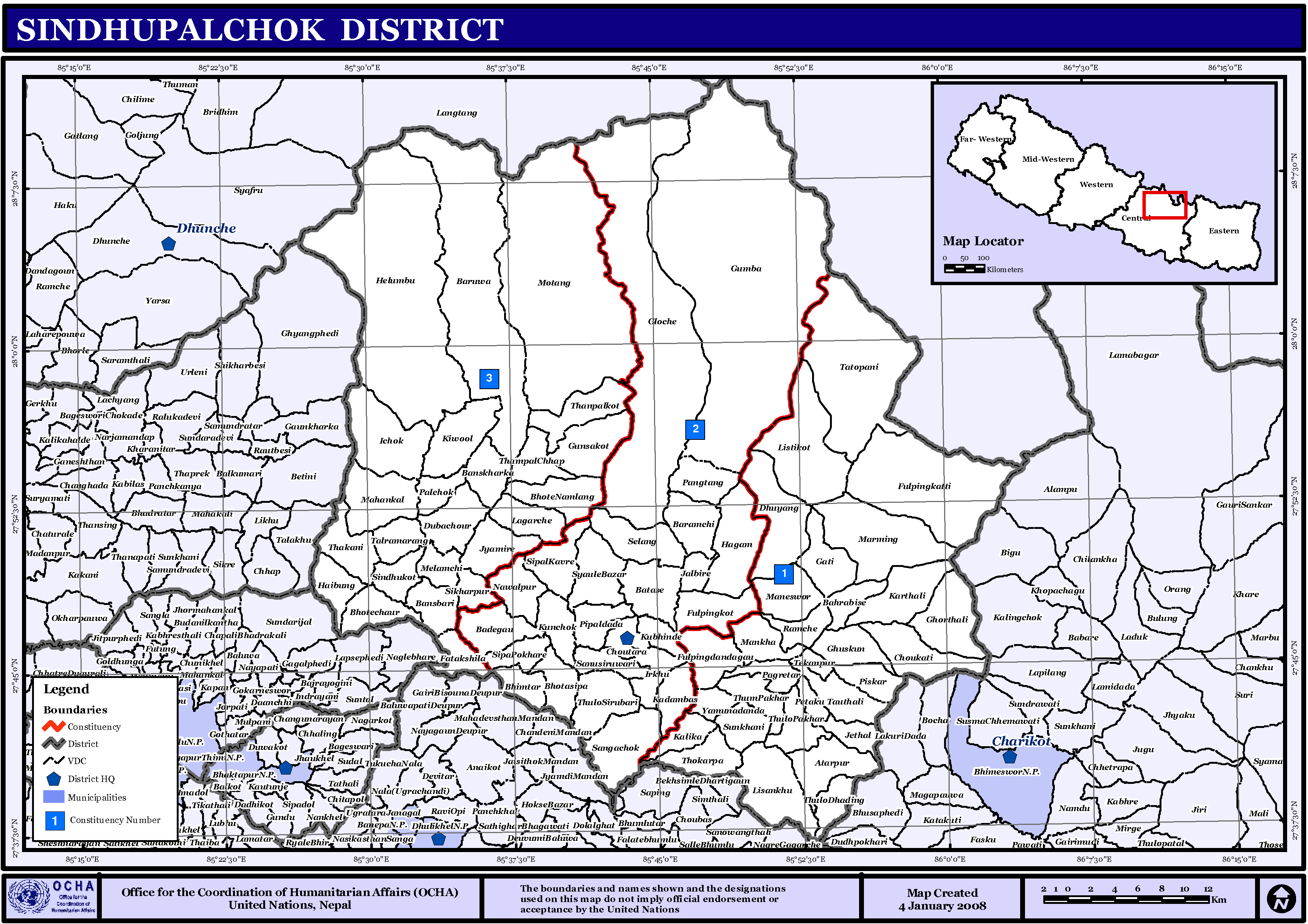
- Sindhupalchowk District

- Location in Nepal Chautara Sangachokgadhi Municipality (Nepal)
- Coordinates: 27°46′N 85°42′E
- Country: Nepal
- Province: Bagmati Province
- District: Sindhupalchowk District

Population
  - Total: 51,347
  - Religions: Hindu Buddhism
- Time zone: UTC+5:45 (NST)
- Postal code: 45300
- Area code: 011
- Website: www.chautaramun.gov.np

Chautara Sangachokgadhi is a municipality in Sindhupalchowk District in Bagmati Province of central Nepal. The municipality was established on 18 May 2014 by merging Pipaldanda, Chautara, Kubhinde, Sanusiruwari Village Development Committees as Chautara Municipality. Later on 2017 it was expended again merging Sangachok, Thulo Sirubari, Kadambas, Irkhu, Batase and Syaule Village Development Committees to form Chautara Sangachowkgadi Municipality. It is now divided to 14 wards. This is the district headquarters of the Sindhupalchowk District. The municipality stands at an elevation of approximately 1,600 m above sea level.

== Ethnic groups ==
The largest ethnic groups are Sherpa, Newar, Brahmin, Chhetri, Gurung, Magars, Tamang, etc. The major languages are Newar, Tamang, Nepali, Nepal Bhasa and English is understood by majority of people. The major religions are Hinduism, Buddhism and Christianity.

== Festivals ==
The festivities such as the Loshar, Dashain, Tihar, Shivratri and many more are observed by all Hindu and Buddhist communities of Chautara. Some of the traditional festivals observed in Chautara apart from those previously mentioned, are Loshar, Bada Dashain, Tihar, Maghe Sankranti, Naga Panchami, Janai Poornima, Teej/Rishi Panchami, Gaurati Jatra, saune sagrati etc.

== Media ==
To Promote local culture, Chautara has two FM radio stations. Radio Sindhu - 105 MHz which is a community radio station and the newly established Radio Planet - 89.1 MHz situated near the bus park of Chautara. Sundar Shireesh has published a Bihanee Media Homes, Bihanee Times Weekly, www.aksharpati.com, Sindhu Jagaran Weekly and many more Media.

== 2015 Nepal Earthquake ==
The town was severely affected by the earthquake on 25 April 2015. Over ninety percent of the homes in the town had been destroyed. The main hospital of the town had collapsed. The town suffered from water shortages. Relief workers and the Nepali army met government officials in Chautara to discuss the emergency response to the humanitarian crisis. However, government officials have stayed out of sight due to the anger of the residents of the town. Dozens of people crowded in front of the administrative office in Chautara, demanding that officials deliver more tents to earthquake survivors sleeping without shelter. The government had tents, but they were not given to the residents of the town.
