= Myanglung Municipality =

District headquarters in Nepal

Myanglung Municipality म्याङलुङ नगरपालिका
- Municipality
- Location in Koshi Province Myanglung Municipality (Nepal)
- Coordinates: 27°7′38″N 87°32′10″E
- Country: Nepal
- Province: Koshi Province
- District: Tehrathum
- No. of wards: 10
- Established: 18 May 2014

Government
  - Type: Mayor–council
  - Mayor: Mr. Sanjay Kumar Tumwahanfe (NCP)
  - Deputy Mayor: Mrs. Parbati Sanu Dangi (NCP)

Area
  - Total: 100.21 km^{2} (38.69 sq mi)
- Elevation: 1,500 m (4,900 ft)

Population (2011)
  - Total: 19,659
  - Density: 196.18/km^{2} (508.10/sq mi)
- Time zone: UTC+5:45 (NST)
- Website: official website

Myanglung (Nepali: म्याङलुङ) is a municipality and the district headquarters of Terhathum District of Koshi Province in eastern Nepal. The "myang" means cat and "lung" means stone in Limbu language. The story is that the cat (myang) in ancient time, pawed the stone (lung) in anger. The municipality is situated at an elevation of about 1500 metres above sea level. Myanglung was converted into a municipality from a village development committee on 18 May 2014, merging the existing village development committees of Myanglung, Piple, Jirikhimti, Ambung, Sabla and Tamphula. According to the census of 2011 the total population of Myanglung is 19,659 including five VDCs.

== Demographics ==
At the time of the 2011 Nepal census, Myanglung Municipality had a population of 20,337. Of these, 50.6% spoke Nepali, 31.0% Limbu, 6.7% Tamang, 4.2% Newar, 2.8% Gurung, 1.6% Sherpa, 1.2% Rai, 0.8% Magar, 0.6% Maithili, 0.1% Bhojpuri, 0.1% Yakkha and 0.3% other languages as their first language.

In terms of ethnicity/caste, 32.5% were Limbu, 19.5% Chhetri, 13.7% Hill Brahmin, 8.3% Tamang, 6.1% Newar, 5.5% Kami, 3.2% Damai/Dholi, 2.9% Gurung, 2.0% Sarki, 1.7% Sherpa, 1.6% Rai, 1.1% Magar, 0.8% Gharti/Bhujel, 0.2% Majhi, 0.1% other Dalit, 0.1% Hajjam/Thakur, 0.1% Mallaha, 0.1% Musalman, 0.1% Sanyasi/Dasnami, 0.1% Tharu, 0.1% Yakkha and 0.3% others.

In terms of religion, 56.6% were Hindu, 28.5% Kirati, 13.3% Buddhist, 1.3% Christian, 0.1% Muslim and 0.1% others.

In terms of literacy, 79.3% could read and write, 2.2% could only read and 18.5% could neither read nor write.
