= Tehrathum District =

Coordinates: 27°15′N 87°35′E

Tehrathum District तेह्रथुम
- District
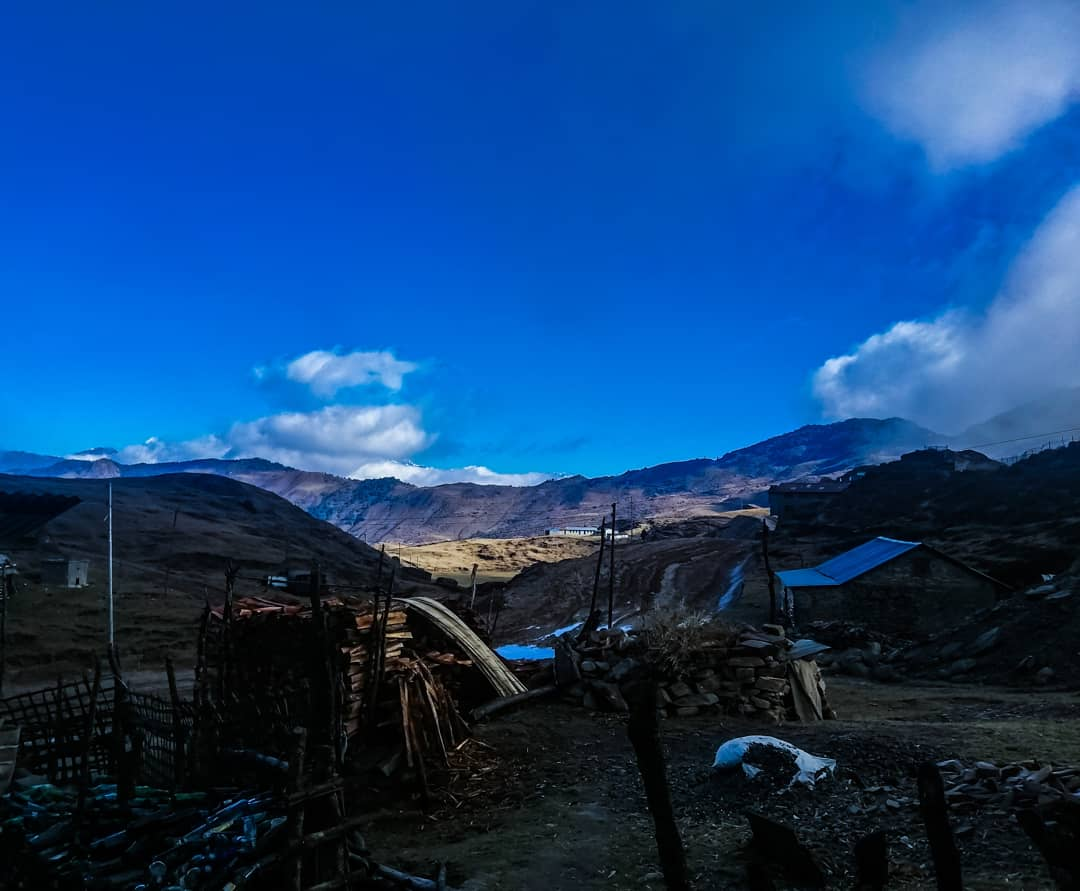
- Landscape of Tehrathum

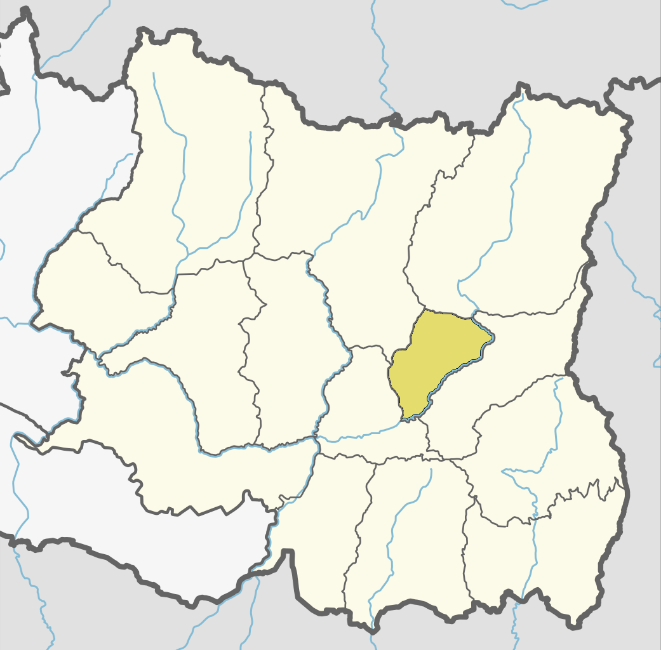
- District location of Tehrathum in Koshi Province
- Country: Nepal
- Province: Koshi Province
- Admin HQ.: Myanglung

Government
  - Type: Coordination committee
  - Body: DCC, Tehrathum

Area
  - Total: 679 km^{2} (262 sq mi)
- Highest elevation: 3,038 m (9,967 ft)
- Lowest elevation: 169 m (554 ft)

Population (2021)
  - Total: 88,731
  - Density: 131/km^{2} (338/sq mi)
  - Households: 30,191

Demographics

Human Development Index
  - Income per capita (US dollars): $999
- Time zone: UTC+05:45 (NPT)
- Telephone Code: 0092
- Website: ddctehrathum.gov.np

Tehrathum District (Nepali: तेह्रथुम जिल्ला pronounced [teɾʌtʰum]), is one of seventy-seven districts of Nepal and one of the 14 districts of Koshi Province

== Demographics ==
Historical population
Year	Pop.	±% p.a.
1981	92,454	—
1991	102,870	+1.07%
2001	113,111	+0.95%
2011	101,577	−1.07%
2022	88,731	−1.22%

In 2021, Terhathum district had a population of 88,731. Tehrathum had a literacy rate of 81.9% and a sex ratio of 1036 females per 1000 males. 34,079 (38.41%) lived in urban municipalities.

Ethnicity/caste of Tehrathum district (2021)
1. Limbu (36.4%)
2. Chhetri (19.4%)
3. Bahun (11.1%)
4. Tamang (6.91%)
5. Kami (4.32%)
6. Damai (3.44%)
7. Gurung (3.26%)
8. Newar (2.84%)
9. Magar (2.78%)
10. Rai (1.70%)
11. Sherpa (1.58%)
12. Sarki (1.50%)
13. Bhujel (1.36%)
14. Other Hill Janjati (2.19%)
15. Others (1.10%)

Ethnicity/caste: 36.40% were Limbu, 19.41% Chhetri, 11.11% Hill Brahmin, 6.91% Tamang, 4.32% Kami, 3.44% Damai/Dholi, 3.26% Gurung, 2.84% Newar, 2.78% Magar, 1.80% Rai, 1.58% Sherpa, 1.50% Sarki and 1.36% Gharti/Bhujel.

Religion in Tehrathum District (2021)
Religion	Percent
Hinduism	50.96%
Kirat Mundhum	33.20%
Buddhism	13.51%
Christianity	2.08%
Others	0.25%

Religion: 50.96% were Hindu, 33.20% Kirati, 13.51% Buddhist, 2.08% Christian, and 0.25% others.

Languages of Tehrathum district (2021)
1. Nepali (50.6%)
2. Limbu (34.0%)
3. Tamang (6.26%)
4. Magar (2.50%)
5. Gurung (1.36%)
6. Sherpa (1.25%)
7. Newar (1.06%)
8. Others (2.97%)

As their first language in 2021, 50.64% of the population spoke Nepali, 33.96% Limbu, 6.26% Tamang, 2.50% Magar, 1.36% Gurung, 1.25% Sherpa and 1.06% Newar. In 2011, 49.84% of the population spoke Nepali as their first language.

== Geographics ==
Climate Zone	Elevation Range	% of Area
Upper Tropical	300 to 1,000 meters 1,000 to 3,300 ft.	24.0%
Subtropical	1,000 to 2,000 meters 3,300 to 6,600 ft.	56.4%
Temperate	2,000 to 3,000 meters 6,400 to 9,800 ft.	19.5%

== Division ==
Tehrathum District consists of the following six subdivisions:

Local body	Nepali	Type	Population (2011)
Aathrai	आठराई	Rural municipality	18,156
Chhathar	छथर	Rural municipality	14,197
Laligurans	लालीगुराँस	Municipality	15,329
Menchhayayem	मेन्छयायेम	Rural municipality	6,678
Myanglung	म्याङलुङ	Municipality	18,750
Phedap	फेदाप	Rural municipality	15,169

== People from Tehrathum District ==
- KP Sharma Oli
- Abhi Subedi
- Rachana Rimal
- Bhanu Bhakta Dhakal
- Bhagi Raj Ingnam
- Krishna Prasad Sitaula
- Shiva Maya Tumbahamphe
- Bimala Tumkhewa
- Durga Prasai
- Bhawani Khapung
- Parsuram Khapung
- Chandra Kuber Khapung

== See also ==
- Radio Tehrathum
- Singha Devi Middle Secondary School, Terathum
- Zones of Nepal
