= Religion in Nepal =

Religion in Nepal (2021)
1. Hinduism (81.2%)
2. Buddhism (8.21%)
3. Islam (5.09%)
4. Kirat Mundhum (3.17%)
5. Christianity (1.76%)
6. Prakriti (Animism) (0.35%)
7. Bon (0.23%)
8. Sikhism (0.01%)
9. Jainism (0.01%)

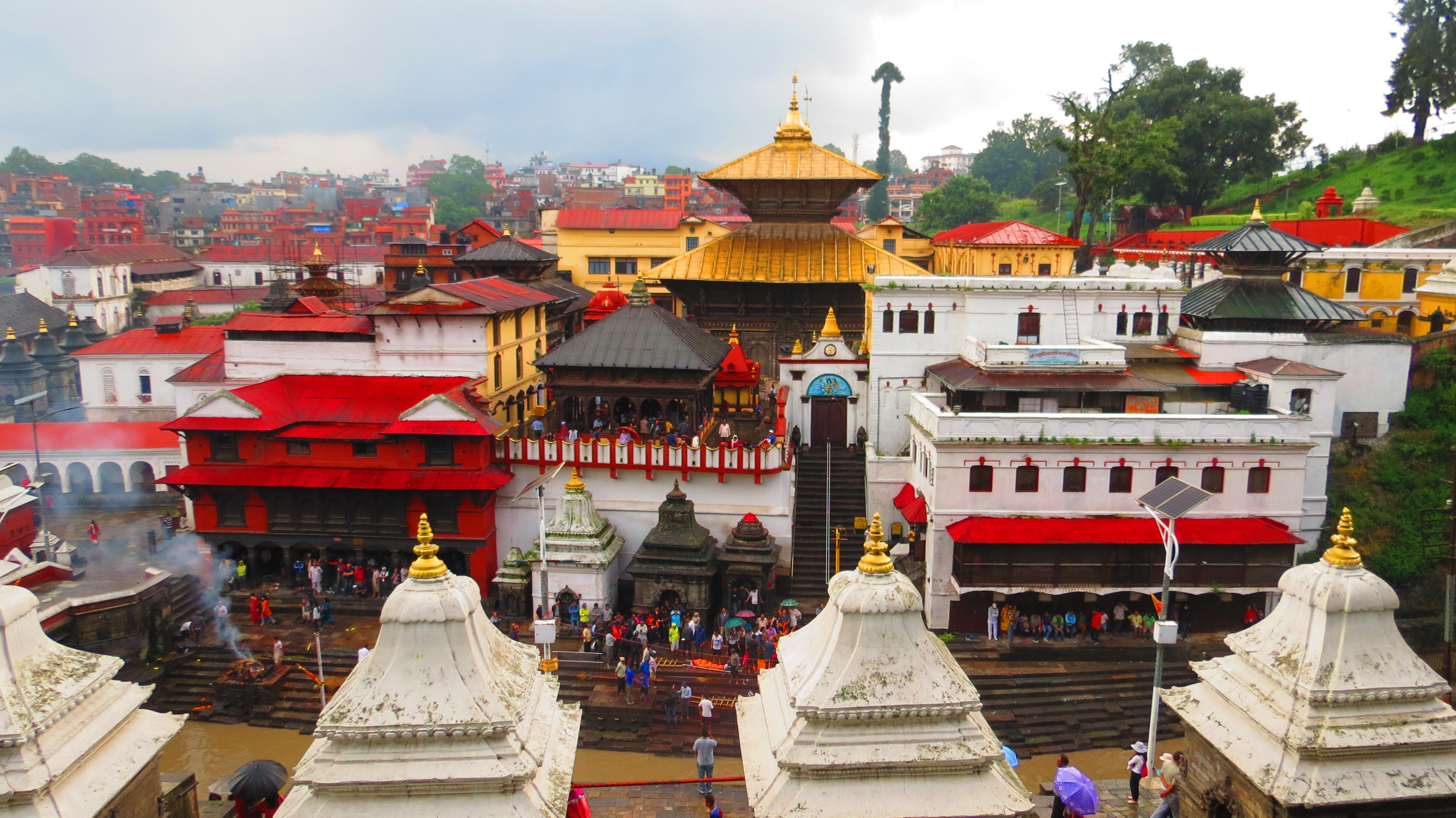
Pashupatinath Temple in the capital Kathmandu is a World Heritage Site.

Religion in Nepal encompasses a wide diversity of groups and beliefs. Nepal is a Hindu-majority country and secularism in Nepal under the interim constitution (Part 1, Article 4) is defined as "Religious and cultural freedom along with the protection of religion and culture handed down from time immemorial." That is, the state government is bound for protecting and fostering Hindu religion while maintaining "religious" and "cultural" freedom throughout the nation as fundamental rights.

Hinduism is the majority religion in Nepal and profoundly influences its social structure and politics, while Buddhism (Tibetan Buddhism) is practiced by some ethnic groups (such as the Newar people) in forms that are strongly influenced by Hinduism. Kiratism is the indigenous religion of the population belonging to the Kirati ethnicity. Small populations, especially in eastern Nepal, adhere to Islam, Christianity, Sikhism, Jainism, Bön, and the Baháʼí Faith.

Nepal has the second-largest Hindu population by number and largest Hindu population by percentage. A number of prominent Hindu pilgrimage sites are located in Nepal, such as Pashupatinath Temple, a UNESCO World Heritage Site. According to the Hindu epic Ramayana, the goddess Sita was born in the Mithila Kingdom of King Janaka. The national animal of Nepal is the cow, which is considered a sacred animal in Hinduism, and the slaughter of cows is illegal in Nepal.

Nepal is considered the birthplace of Siddhartha Gautama (the Buddha). As such, Buddhism holds cultural importance in the country and is intertwined with Hinduism in some communities.

The Nepali constitution guarantees freedom of religion. Forced conversion from Hinduism to other religions is against the law, especially when money is used as a direct or indirect incentive to convert. Prior to the movement for democracy in early 2006 and the sacking of King Gyanendra in 2008, the country was officially a Hindu kingdom, and the constitution still protects and fosters the Hindu religion. Nationalists have sometimes protested against secularism, and some wish to see Nepal become a Hindu-democratic state. Senior minister Prem Ale has advocated for constitutionally declaring Nepal a Hindu state.

== History ==
Hinduism has been present in Nepal since the beginning of recorded history in the area. Muslims came to the country around the 11th century and brought Islam with them. Sikhism came to Nepal during the 18th century and spread throughout Nepal, and Jainism came to Nepal during the 19th century but spread only to Kathmandu and some districts of Nepal.

Religious tolerance can be found in royal orders dated Falgun Sudi 12, 1884 V.S. issued by the Hindu Shah monarch Rajendra Bikram Shah under the premiership of Bhimsen Thapa to Buddhist monks in the Kingdom of Nepal:

Our father [King Girban] has issued a copper plate inscription declaring that nobody shall harass you so long as you observe traditional religious practices (dharma). We hereby reconfirm that order.

— Royal Order to Jhimuryas of Tukucha-Gumba

According to the 2021 census, 81.19% (23,677,103 people) of the Nepalese population is Hindu, 8.21% (2,393,549 people) are Buddhist, 5.09% (1,483,060 people) are Muslim, 3.17% (924,204 people) are Kiratist (indigenous ethnic religion), 1.76% (512,191 people) are Christian, 0.35% (102,048 people) follow Prakriti, 0.23 percent (67,226 people) follow Bon, 0.01% are Sikhs, and 0.01% are Jains. This varies from the 2001 census, where 80.62% of Nepalese were Hindu, 10.74% were Buddhist, 4.20% were Muslim, 3.60% were Kirant (an indigenous religion), 0.45% were Christian, and 0.4% were classified as other groups such as Bön. Nepal is home to the most Quakers of any country in Asia. As of 2017, there were 7,600 Quakers, most belonging to Evangelical Quakerism (Gurneyite).

In 1971, Hindus made up 89.4% of the population, Buddhists 7.5%, and Kirants statistically, 0%. The prevalence of dual-faith practices – particularly among Hindus and Buddhists – complicates statistics on religious groups.

At the beginning of the 1990s, Hindus made up at least 87% of the population in every region of Nepal. The largest concentrations of Buddhists were found in the eastern hills, the Kathmandu Valley, and the central Tarai; in each area, about 10% of the population were Buddhist. Buddhism was more common among the Newar and Tibeto-Nepalese groups. Among the Tibeto-Nepalese, those most influenced by Hinduism were the Magar, Sunuwar, and Rai peoples. Hindu influence was less prominent among the Gurung, Limbu, Yakkha, Tamang, and Thakali groups, who continued to employ Buddhist monks for their religious ceremonies. Since Hinduism and Buddhism are both Indian religions, their practices usually complement each other, and many people practice a combination of both. In 2015, a new constitution was adopted, and equal rights were granted to all religions in Nepal.

Nepal's constitution does not give anyone the right to evangelise or convert anyone to another religion. Nepal also passed a more stringent anti-conversion law in 2017.

== Demographics ==
Population trends for major religious groups in Nepal
Year	Hindu	Buddhist	Muslim	Kirant	Christian	Other/ Unspecified
1952-54	88.87%	8.59%	2.54%	—N/a	—N/a	0.01%
1961	87.69%	9.25%	2.98%	—N/a	—N/a	0.07%
1971	89.39%	7.50%	3.04%	—N/a	0.02%	0.05%
1981	89.50%	5.32%	2.66%	—N/a	0.03%	2.49%
1991	86.51%	7.78%	3.53%	1.72%	0.17%	0.28%
2001	80.62%	10.74%	4.20%	3.60%	0.45%	0.39%
2011	81.34%	9.04%	4.39%	3.04%	1.41%	0.78%
2021	81.19%	8.21%	5.09%	3.17%	1.76%	0.58%

Religion in Nepal (2021 Census)
Religion	Population	Percentage
Hinduism	23,677,744	81.19%
Buddhism	2,393,549	8.2%
Islam	1,483,066	5.09%
Kirat	924,204	3.17%
Christianity	512,313	1.76%
Others	173,702	0.65%
Total	29,164,578	100%

== Gallery ==
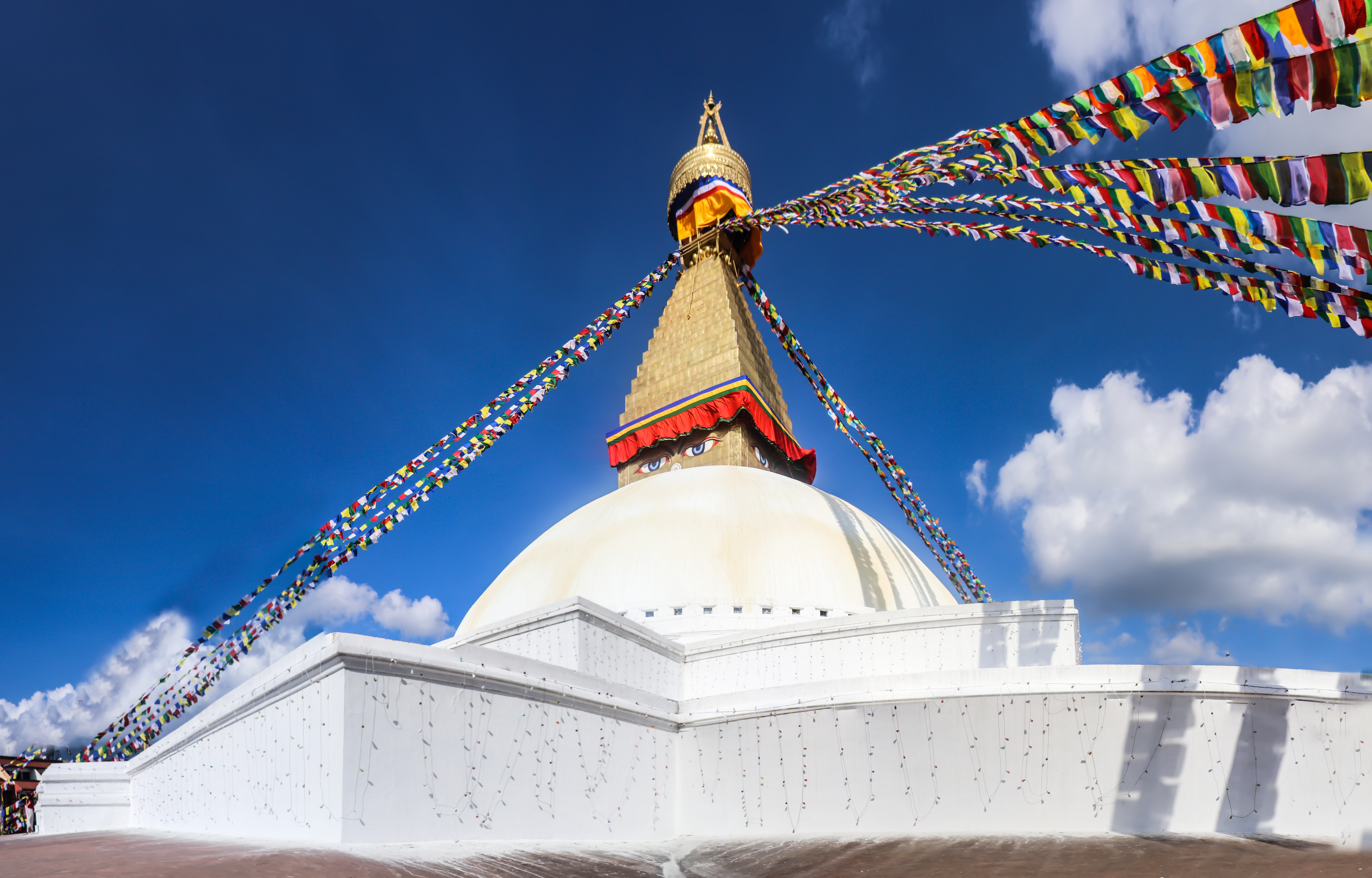
Boudhanath Stupa, a Buddhist temple in Kathmandu Valley

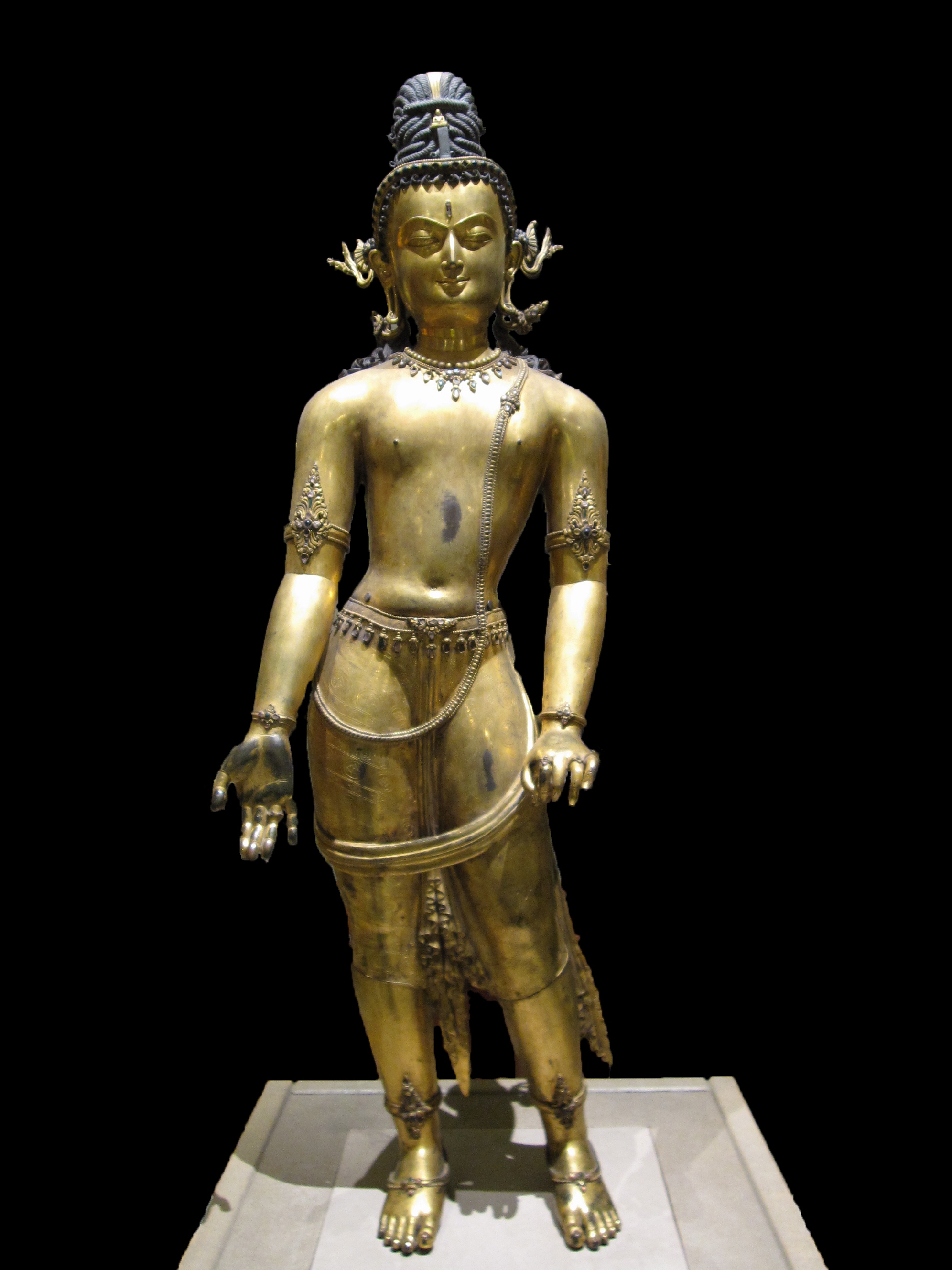
The Bodhisattva Avalokiteshvara, gilded bronze. Nepal, 16th century AD

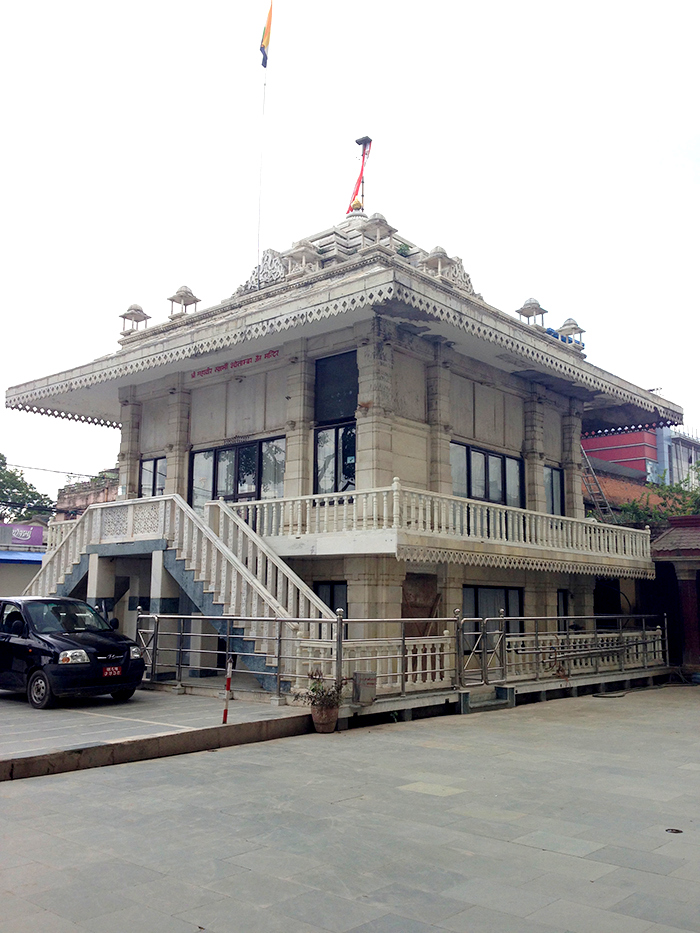
The Jain temple in Kathmandu, Nepal

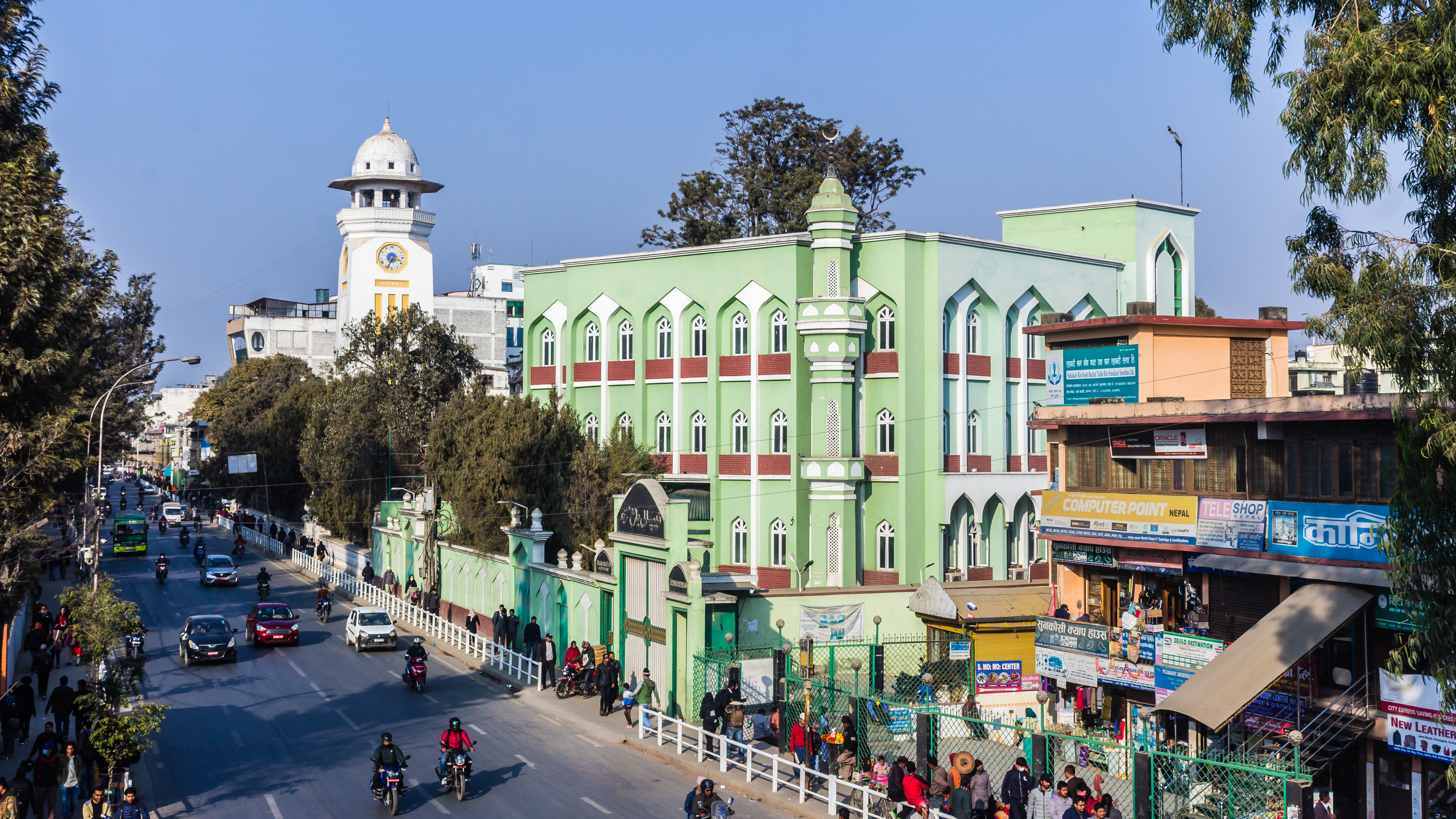
Nepal Jama Mosque, one of the largest mosques in Nepal

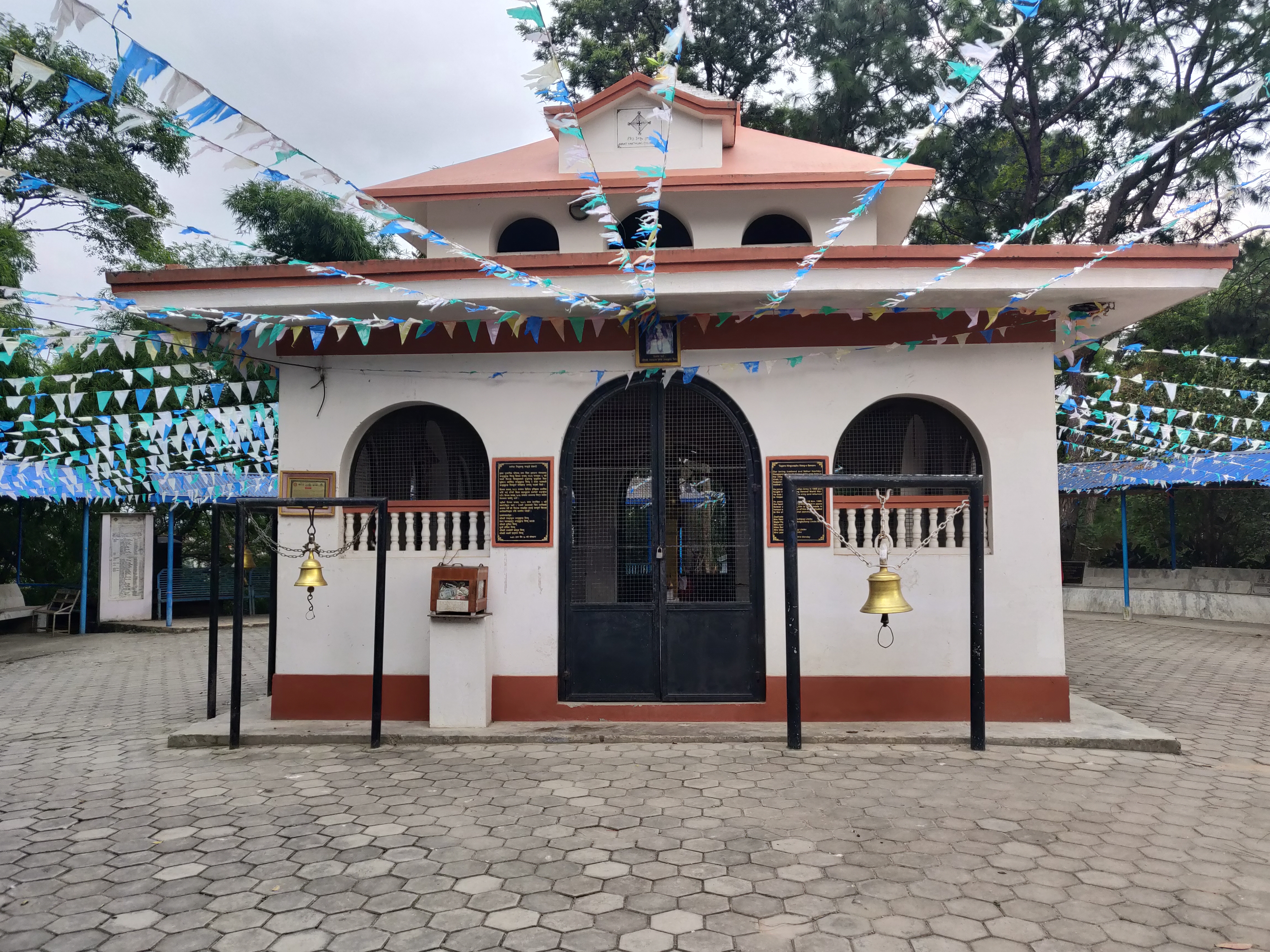
Kirat (religion) Manghim or Mankhim of Kirat community in Lalitpur, Nepal

== See also ==
- Hinduism in Nepal
- Buddhism in Nepal
- Christianity in Nepal
- Islam in Nepal
- Sikhism in Nepal
- Judaism in Nepal
- Jainism in Nepal
- Baháʼí Faith in Nepal
- Irreligion in Nepal
- Freedom of religion in Nepal
