= Baháʼí Faith in Nepal =

The Baháʼí Faith in Nepal begins after a Nepalese leader encountered the religion in his travels before World War II. Following World War II, the first known Baháʼí to enter Nepal was around 1952 by N. P. Sinha who moved to Birgunj and the first Nepalese Baháʼí Local Spiritual Assembly elected in 1959, and its National Assembly in 1972. For a period of time, between 1976 and 1981, all assemblies were dissolved due to legal restrictions. The 2001 census reported 1,211 Baháʼís (including 496 children), and since the 1990s the Baháʼí community of Nepal has been involved in a number of interfaith organizations including the Inter-religious Council of Nepal promoting peace in the country. The Association of Religion Data Archives (relying on World Christian Encyclopedia) estimated some 4,300 Baháʼís in 2005.

== Early days ==
In the 1920-1940 period Col. Raja Jai Prithvi Bahadur Singh, Raja Of Bajang, traveled to Europe and the Americas and heard of the Baháʼí Faith through contact with individuals like Lady Blomfield.

The first known entry of members of the Baháʼí Faith to Nepal was around 1952 by N. P. Sinha, an Indian Baháʼí, to Birgunj soon followed by Kedarnath Pradhan who was from Sikkim before moving to Kathmandu along with his family. News of the religion also arrived following a United Nations conference in Colombo at which Nepalese delegates expressed interest in the religion. Following conversions and further pioneers the first Local Spiritual Assembly in Nepal was that of Kathmandu city which was elected in 1959. In 1960 there were assemblies in Kathmandu, Dohlka Shahr, and Bhaktapur and smaller groups of Baháʼís in Dharan, Baklong, Pokhara, and Biratnagar; and over one hundred members of the religion.

== Growth ==
By 1963 the local assemblies of Nepal included: Bhaktapur, Biratnagar, Dharan, Kathmandu, and Pokhara, with small groups of Baháʼís in Bodegaon, Dabeha, Nalar, and Dolkhashahr. Isolated Baháʼís were in Bakloong, Damdame, Rakhughati, and Rakheshwav and Hand of the Cause John Esslemont's Baháʼu'lláh and the New Era was translated into Nepalese. Perhaps the first Hand of the Cause to visit Nepal was Rúhíyyih Khanum in 1964. In 1967 ambassador Ram Prasad Manandhar visited the Baháʼí House of Worship in Wilmette, USA. In 1969 Hand of the Cause Adelbert Mühlschlegel visited a number of central Asian countries including Nepal at the request of the Universal House of Justice. In August 1971 youth from Nepal were among the attendees at a western Asian Baháʼí youth conference in India.

With Hand of the Cause Ali-Akbar Furutan representing the Universal House of Justice, the Baháʼís of Nepal held their first national convention to elect their National Spiritual Assembly in 1972 during the reign of King Mahendra. The convention had forty delegates. The members of the first national assembly were: Amar Pradhan, Shyam Maherjan, Jujubhai Sakya, Aranda Lal Shrestha, Dinesh Verma, Keith de Folo, W. F. Chaittonalla, P. N. Rai, D. K. Malla - from Buddhist, Hindu, Christian backgrounds. In November 1972 delegates from the local assemblies of the Narayani Zone gathered for a local conference on the progress of the religion to study Baháʼí history, Baháʼí administration in general and specifically electing local assemblies, and Baháʼí teachings.

== Dissolution and reformation ==
The national and local assemblies were all dissolved between 1976 and 1981 due to legal restrictions. However Baháʼís from Nepal were able to attend the October 1977 Asian Baháʼí Women's Conference with Hand of the Cause Rúhíyyih Khanum after which she toured in Nepal including addressing some 700 students at the Padma Kanya Women's College (see Education in Nepal.) In May 1981 45 Nepalese Baháʼís from various localities attended a conference at the national center in Kathmandu. A highlight of the weekend conference was the first showing in Nepal of the film The Green Light Expedition about Rúhíyyih Khanum's trip up the Amazon River. The local and national assemblies were reelected in and since 1982 - this dissolution and reformation was during the reign of King Birendra. When the national convention gathered there were 25 delegates. In 1983 there is comment that a distinguishing effect of pioneers was that they "not only took an interest in our troubles, they also looked on conditions in Nepal as their own and talked about our problems as their problems." Hand of the Cause Collis Featherstone attended the 1983 national convention. In 1984 the National Spiritual Assembly of the Baháʼís of Nepal printed "Selected Writings on Baha'i Administration" in parallel English and Nepali scripts. Later in 1984 Nepalese Baháʼís attended the conference at the almost completed Lotus Temple. By 1985 the Baháʼís assembly of Malangwa has established a school that has about 30 students, several of whom receive scholarships. Low and high caste children eat and drink together, and the villagers have accepted that Baháʼí schools do not observe customs concerning caste. In 1988 the national assembly had expanded and improved its adult literacy program. In 1989 representatives of the national Assemblies of Nepal along with the Andaman and Nicobar Islands, Bangladesh, India, Sikkim and Sri Lanka along with Continental Counselors and members of sub-regional councils in India met in Pune, India to discuss creating a unified vision of the religion and its progress across the sub-continent.

On 29 September 1990 Hand of the Cause Collis Featherstone died and is buried in Kathmandu.

== Modern community ==
Since its inception the religion has had involvement in socio-economic development beginning by giving greater freedom to women, promulgating the promotion of female education as a priority concern, and that involvement was given practical expression by creating schools, agricultural coops, and clinics. The religion entered a new phase of activity when a message of the Universal House of Justice dated 20 October 1983 was released. Baháʼís were urged to seek out ways, compatible with the Baháʼí teachings, in which they could become involved in the social and economic development of the communities in which they lived. Worldwide in 1979 there were 129 officially recognized Baháʼí socio-economic development projects. By 1987, the number of officially recognized development projects had increased to 1,482. Since the early 1990s the Baháʼís of Nepal have involved themselves in diverse concerns in Nepal.

One group of Baháʼís set up an organization "Education, Curriculum, and Training Associates", or "ECTA", which means "unity" in Nepali, in 1997 to promote rural development strategies and programs that can be done at low cost by village groups without extensive outside aid. Nepalese Baháʼís joined the Inter-religious Council of Nepal promoting peace in the country who have also met with CPN Maoist leadership and consulted on AIDS issues.

A "Sacred Gifts for a Living Planet" conference in Nepal in November 2000 was organized by the Alliance of Religions and Conservation and the World Wide Fund for Nature included Baháʼís.

The Club of Budapest offered a "Change the World -- Best Practice Award" given to four international educational projects that aim at empowering people through learning and enabling them to take full control of their economic development. Marcia Odell was one of the awardees, representing the Women's Empowerment Program (WEP) in Nepal, which has developed an approach to microfinance and the empowerment of women. The WEP program has reached more than 130,000 women in Nepal and has also received considerable support from the Baháʼí community of Nepal.

In December 2003 a conference entitled "Education: The Right of Every Girl and Boy," brought together representatives of five South Asian countries by government officials and members of the Baháʼí communities: Bangladesh, India, Nepal, Pakistan, and Sri Lanka and was co-sponsored and supported by: the Baháʼí International Community, UNESCO, World Vision India, National Foundation for India, Save the Children UK, Commonwealth Education Fund, and India Alliance for Child Rights.

In 2006 Baháʼís participated in an international youth conference organized by Hindu Vidyapeeth Nepal. It was set as a peace conference with the theme of 'Deepening our Spirituality' in Kathmandu.

In 2023, the Universal House of Justice announced plans for the construction of a local Bahá’í House of Worship in Nepal.

=== Demographics ===
Though it is illegal to convert others, occasional reports of police harassment, and reports of discrimination based on religious belief or practice by 2001 the national census reported 1,211 Baháʼís (but includes 496 children down to 0–4 years old—indeed the largest segment of population was 10–14 years old.) There were more women than men, and of the 5 Divisions more Baháʼís lived in the Eastern Division and the least in the Western one. The Association of Religion Data Archives (relying on World Christian Encyclopedia) estimated some 4,350 Baháʼís in 2005. The 2001 census reported 0.01% Baháʼís in Nepal, and the 2011 census reported 0% Baháʼís.

== See also ==
- Baháʼí Faith by country
- Baháʼí Faith in India
- History of Nepal
- Religion in Nepal
- Freedom of religion in Nepal
  - Spiritual ecology
