= Hinduism in Nepal =

Nepalese Hindus Nēpālī hindūhāru नेपाली हिन्दुहरू
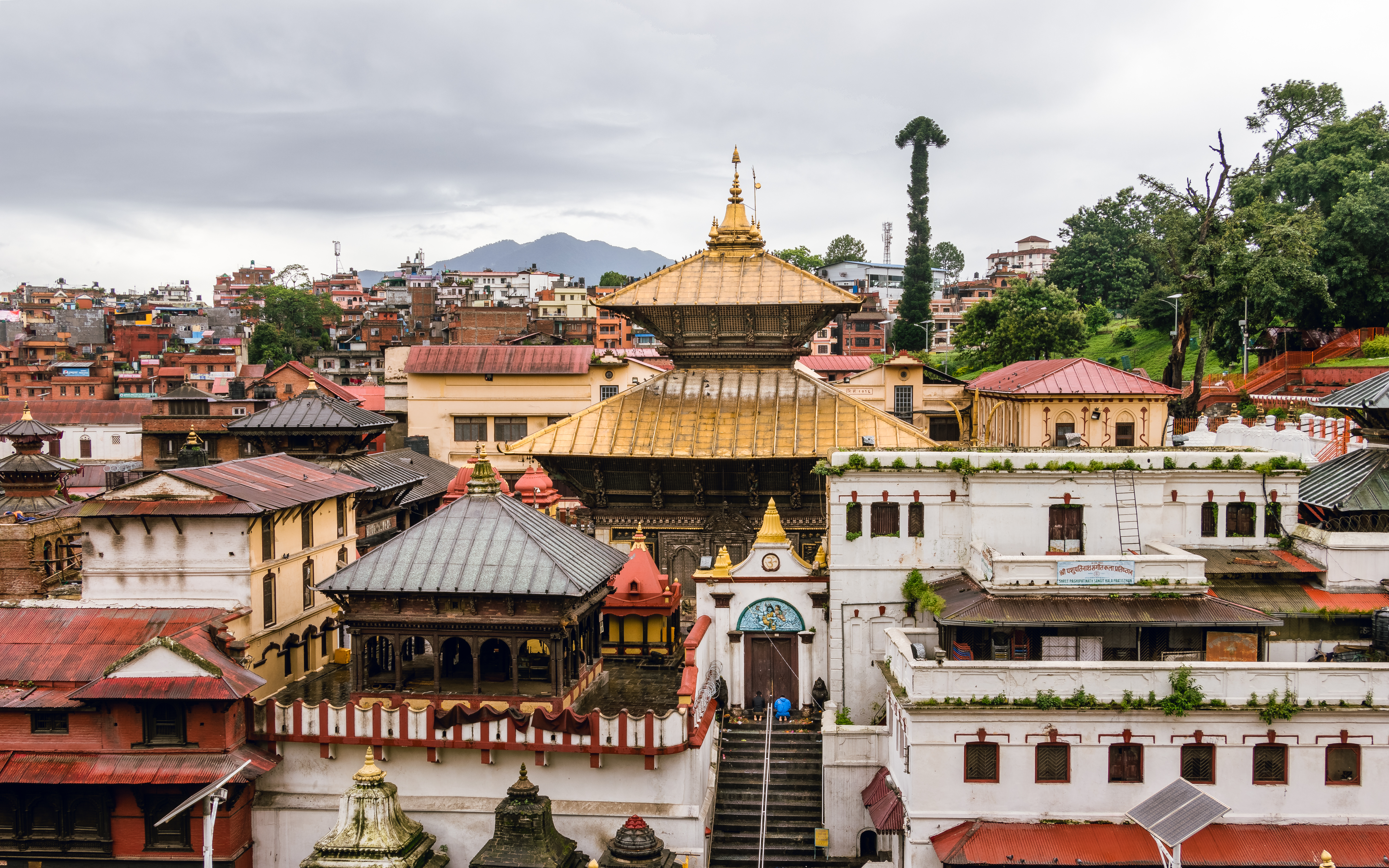
- Pashupatinath Temple, the largest Hindu temple in Nepal dedicated to Lord Shiva

Total population
- 23,677,744 ▲ (2021 Census) (81.30% of the country's population)▼

Regions with significant populations
- All over Nepal

Religions
- Hinduism

Scriptures
- Vedas

Languages
- Sanskrit (Sacred); Nepali, Newar, Bhojpuri, Maithili, Awadhi and other signed languages.

Hinduism is the largest religion in Nepal. In 2006, the country declared itself a secular country through democracy, after the abolition of its monarchy. According to the 2021 census, the Hindu population in Nepal is estimated to be around 23,677,744 which accounts for at least 81.19% of the country's population, the highest percentage of Hindus of any country in the world. Vikram Samvat, one of the two official calendars used in Nepal, is a solar calendar essentially the same to that widespread in North India as a religious calendar, and is based on Solar unit of time.

Among the ethnic groups are the Bahun, Thakuri, Tharu, Chhetri, Magars, Hill Dalits, Madheshi, Newari people. Meanwhile, among the major ethnic groups Sherpa, Rai, Limbu, Gurung and Tamang have lowest percentage of followers of Hinduism within the group.

== History ==
Local traditions hold that a Hindu sage named "Ne" established himself in the Kathmandu Valley in ancient times, and that the name "Nepal" means "the place protected ("pala" in Sanskrit) by the sage Ne". He performed religious ceremonies at Teku, at the confluence of the Bagmati and Bishnumati rivers. According to legends, he selected a pious cowherd to be the first of the many kings of the Gopala dynasty. These rulers are said to have ruled Nepal for over 500 years. He selected Bhuktaman to be the first king in the line of the Gopala (Cowherd) dynasty. The Gopala dynasty ruled for 621 years. Yakshya Gupta was the last king of this dynasty.

According to Skanda Purana, a rishi called "Ne" or "Nemuni" used to live in the Himalayas. The Pashupati Purana, mentions that he is a saint and a protector. He is said to have practiced penance at the Bagmati and Kesavati rivers and to have taught his doctrines there as well.

In the mid-18th century, Prithvi Narayan Shah, a Gurkha king, set out to unify what would become present-day Nepal. He began by securing the neutrality of the neighboring mountain kingdoms. After several bloody battles and sieges, notably the Battle of Kirtipur, he conquered the Kathmandu Valley in 1769.

=== Timeline of Hinduism in Nepal ===
==== Medieval Era ====
Gurkha control reached its height when the North Indian territories from the Kumaon and Garhwal Kingdoms in the west to Sikkim in the east came under Nepalese control. A dispute with Tibet over the control of mountain passes and inner Tingri valleys of Tibet forced the Qing Emperor of China to start the Sino-Nepali War, which compelled the Nepali to retreat to their own borders in the north. The rivalry between the Kingdom of Nepal and the East India Company over the control of the states bordering Nepal eventually led to the Anglo-Nepali War (1815–1816). At first, the British underestimated the Nepali and were soundly defeated until they committed more military resources than they had anticipated needing. Thus began the reputation of Gurkhas as fierce and ruthless soldiers. The war ended in the Sugauli Treaty, under which Nepal ceded recently captured lands.

Factionalism inside the royal family led to a period of instability. In 1846, a plot was discovered revealing that the reigning queen had planned to overthrow Bir Narsingh Kunwar, a fast-rising military leader. This led to the Kot massacre; armed clashes between military personnel and administrators loyal to the queen led to the execution of several hundred princes and chieftains around the country. Bir Narsingh Kunwar emerged victorious and founded the Rana dynasty, and came to be known as Jung Bahadur Rana. The king was made a titular figure, and the post of Prime Minister was made powerful and hereditary. The Ranas were staunchly pro-British and assisted them during the Indian Rebellion of 1857 (and later in both World Wars). In 1860, some parts of the western Terai region were gifted to Nepal by the British as a friendly gesture because of their military support to sustain British control in India during the rebellion (known as Naya Muluk or "new country"). In 1923, the United Kingdom and Nepal formally signed an agreement of friendship that superseded the Sugauli Treaty of 1816.

The Hindu practice of Sati, in which a widow sacrifices herself in the funeral pyre of her husband, was banned in 1919, and slavery was officially abolished in 1924. Rana rule was marked by tyranny, debauchery, economic exploitation, and religious persecution.

==== Early-modern era ====
In the time of early-modern era in Nepal, Hinduism was at the peak of its prominence. The Shah rulers focused on the Hinduization of Nepal; even then there were good relations of Nepalis Hindus with the Nepali Muslims. The Nepal rulers passed laws making conversion from Hinduism to Islam and Christianity illegal and enacting them as criminal offenses. These laws were enforced even after the revolution of 1951, and were reaffirmed in the legal code of 1963, which prohibited the preaching of Christianity or Islam and stipulated three years in jail for those who attempted to convert people, and six years for those who succeeded in converting others. For those who "attempt" to be converted, there was a fine of a hundred rupees, and for those who actually converted (that is, were baptized), there would be imprisonment of one year. The code stated that "when somebody becomes converted, the conversion is nullified, and he remains in the Hindu dharma [religion]".

From the early 1960s, the state began to actively prosecute Christians in places where the baptism of Nepali citizens had occurred; this active governmental persecution continued up to 1990. Following baptisms in Nepalgunj and Tansen between 1958 and 1960, pastors David Mukhia and Prem Pradhan, along with six baptized believers, were prosecuted by the authorities for proselytism and conversion. The pastors were sentenced to six years imprisonment; the male converts were sentenced to one year imprisonment and the female converts to six months. Prosecutions such as this continued for the whole of the Panchayat period: when an amnesty was proclaimed in 1990, there were 30 individuals in Nepal imprisoned for crimes of proselytism or conversion, and 200 others who were subject to legal action for the same offenses.

==== Modern era ====
After the overthrow of the Rana regime in 1951, King Tribhuvan opened Nepal's borders and appealed to the outside world to assist in Nepal's development. Then, he granted the freedom of religion to Nepalese, especially to Nepali Muslims, and the first church was established in Nepal. Hinduism is the state religion of Nepal.

== Hinduization by rulers ==
According to various historical sources, even though the presence of varna and caste had been known as an element in the social structure of the Kathmandu Valley since the Licchavi period (c., 3rd century CE), the majority of the residents of the Nepal Valley were for the first time codified into a written code only in the 14th century in the Manava Nyaya Shastra by the king Jayasthithi Malla (1354–1395 A.D.). Jayasthithi Malla, with the aid of five Kānyakubja and Maithil Brahmins whom he invited from the bordering Indian plains, divided the population of the valley into four major classes (varna)—Brahmin, Kshatriya, Vaishya, Shudra—derived from the ancient Hindu text Manusmriti and based on individual's occupational roles. The four classes varna encompassed a total of 64 castes jat within it, with the Shudras being further divided into 36 sub-castes. Around this time, in western Nepal, the Khasa-Malla confederacy got hinduized and the caste divisions and modern identies of the Khas people were born. The new caste distinctions and hierarchy of the Khas differed from neighboring Madeshi and Newar populations, being divided into only 3 main varnas, Bhramin (Bahun), Kshatriya (Chettri), and Hill-Dalit, along with Sanyasis.

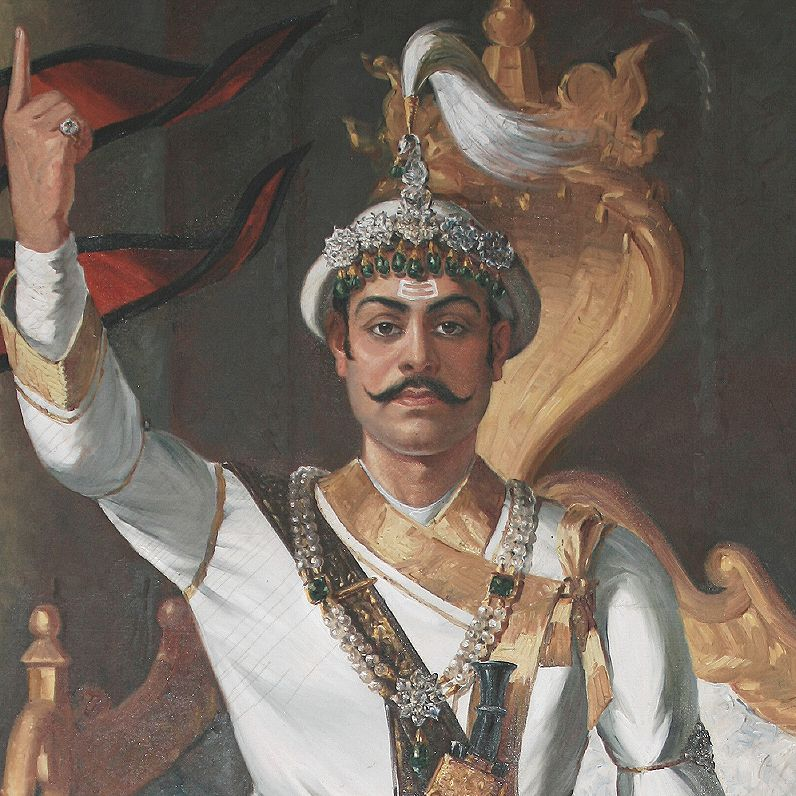
Prithvi Narayan Shah, founder of the Kingdom of Nepal

After the Gurkhali conquest of Kathmandu Valley, King Prithvi Narayan Shah expelled the Christian Capuchin missionaries from Patan and revisioned Nepal as Asal Hindustan (Real Land of Hindus). The Tagadharis, thread wearing Hindus of higher categorization, enjoyed the privileged status in the Nepalese capital and more access to the central power after the Gurkhali King Prithvi Narayan's conquest of Kathmandu Valley. Since then Hinduization became the significant policy of the Kingdom of Nepal.

The Nepali civil code Muluki Ain was commissioned by Jung Bahadur Rana after his European tour and enacted in 1854. It was rooted in traditional Hindu Law and codified social practices for several centuries in Nepal. The law also comprised Prāyaścitta (avoidance and removal of sin) and Ācāra (the customary law of different castes and communities). It was an attempt to include the entire Hindu as well as non-Hindu population of Nepal of that time into a single hierarchic civic code from the perspective of the Khas rulers.

The Hinduization of Nepal was mainly predominant in Kathmandu and the adjoining regions near the Valley. Nepali society has been known for its interfaith religious harmony and tolerance, but the Hinduization and Saffronisation of Nepal by the Shah dynasty, especially by Prithvi Narayan Shah, were seen as the persecution of other religious communities. After that time, until the 1940s, propagation of any other faith than Hinduism was prohibited. The Hindu community was given special rights and even more rights than the other religious community, though freedom of religion was present in the Kingdom of Nepal.

Then, there was the era of Rana dynasty, which was composed mainly of Kshatriya Hindus. Though in the regime of Rana dynasty, Nepal did not witness much Hinduization, but there were still strict Hindus law.

== Hindu symbolism of Nepal ==
The pennant is an important Hindu flag that flutters atop Hindu temples. Hindu symbolism of Nepal Through its deep spiritual heritage, ancient temples, holy rivers, and religious festivals, Hindu symbolism in Nepal gives a glimpse of the country's profound spiritual traditions. Nepal, the site of the sacred Pashupatinath Temple, is rich in Hindu symbolism, expressed through signs like the Om symbol, a trident (Trishul), a lotus flower, bells, and religious ceremonies. Mountains, particularly the Himalayas, are regarded as holy and even linked to Lord Shiva. Rivers such as the Bagmati are spiritually significant for both cleansing and religious observances. Besides temple architecture, Hindu symbolism is apparent through Nepal's colorful festivals and daily worship practices. This also makes it a key hub of Hinduism and cultural heritage.

Popular tradition holds that Vishnu had organized the Nepali people and given them their flag, with the sun and moon as emblems on it. In a Hindu Purana, it is written that it was Shiva who handed the flag to Vishnu, and then Vishnu to Indra, for the purpose for battling demons.

=== List of festivals in Nepal ===
- Dashain
- Tihar
- Janai Purnima, Rakshya Bandhan, Khumbeshwor Mela Patan
- Shree Krishna Janmastami
- Maghe Sankranti
- Shree Panchami
- Maha Shivaratri
- Fagu Purnima (Holi)
- Matatirtha Aunsi (Nepali equivalent of Mother's Day)
- Gokarna Aunsi (Nepali equivalent of Father's Day)
- Buddha Jayanti (birthday of the Budhha, but also celebrated by people as great harmony Buddhists in Nepal. Also majority of Nepalese Hindu believe Buddha to be 9th avatar of Lord Vishnu)
- Ghanta Karna Chaturdasi
- Gaijatra
- Teej
- Indrajatra (in Kathmandu)
- Chhath
- Ghode Jatra
- Shree Ram Nawami
- Vivaha Panchami
- Bagh Jatra
- Bhairav Kumari Jatra
- Chaite Dashain
- Gaura Parva
- Gunla
- Guru Purnima
- Rato Macchendranath Jatra
- Mani Rimdu
- Mata-yaa
- Neel Barahi Pyakhan
- Rath Yatra
- Tamu Dhee
- Tansen Jatra
- Taya Macha
- Yomari Punhi

=== Impact of Hinduism in modern Nepal ===
Hindu and Buddhist traditions in Nepal go back more than two millennia. In Lumbini, Buddha was born, and Pashupatinath temple in Kathmandu is an old and famous Shiva temple of Hindus. Nepal has several other temples and Buddhist monasteries, as well as places of worship for other religious groups. Traditionally, Nepalese philosophical thoughts are ingrained with the Hindu and Buddhist philosophical ethos and traditions, which include elements of Kashmir Shaivism, Nyingma School of Tibetan Buddhism, works of Karmacharyas of Bhaktapur, and tantric traditions. Tantric traditions are deep rooted in Nepal, including the practice of animal sacrifices. Five types of animals, always male, are considered acceptable for sacrifice: water buffalo, goats, sheep, chickens, and ducks. Cows are very sacred animals and are considered as mothers and banned from killing. Nepal has been the home of many ancient sites of the Hinduism and is the hub for the tourism for many Hindu pilgrimages.

=== Hindu temples ===
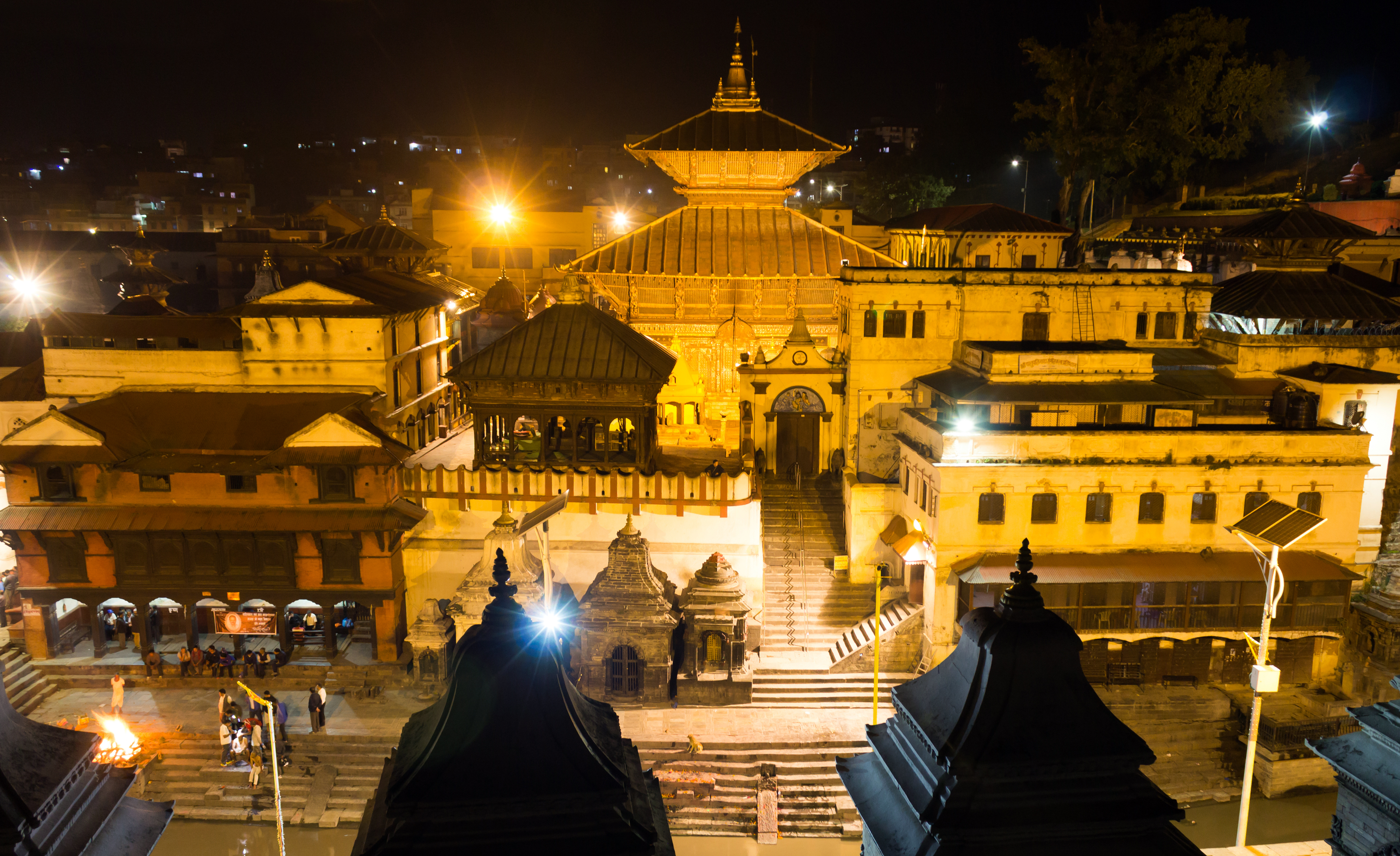
Night view of Pashupatinath Temple

Before 2007, when Nepal was a Hindu country, the Pashupatinath Temple was considered as the "Temple of Nepal". The Pashupatinath Temple is considered as the most sacred temple for the Hindus of Nepal which once used to be Charumati Vihar of Buddhist as Pashupati hold the statue of Great King Virupakshya.

There are many Hindu temple located in Nepal. The notable of them are listed below:

- Badimalika Temple
- Siddhikali Temple
- Changu Narayan
- Suryavinayak Temple
- Doleshwor Mahadeva Temple
- Maisthan Mandir
- Padukasthan
- Chintang Devi temple
- Janaki Mandir
- Sankat Mochan Mandir
- Koteshwor Mahadev
- Pashupatinath Temple
- Swayambhunath
- Ashok Binayak Temple
- Bhairabsthan Temple

== Relations with other communities ==
=== Hinduism and Buddhism ===
There has traditionally been a great deal of intermingling of Hindu and Buddhist beliefs. Many people regarded as Hindus in the 1981 census could also in some senses be called Buddhists. Hindus long have worshipped at Buddhist temples and Buddhists at Hindu temples. The reason for this is that both Hinduism and Buddhism have common roots, and over most of their history have not been seen as separate groups, but rather cooperative sects with shared religious traditions. Because of such dual faith practices (or mutual respect), the differences between Hindus and Buddhists have been very subtle and academic in nature; Hindus and Buddhists have never engaged in any religious conflicts for past millennia. There are many temples where both Hindus and Buddhists can enter and worship.

=== Hinduism and Islam ===
Though historically, there have been no major conflict between the Hindus and Muslims in the Nepal, though in the 20th century there have been some controversies between the two communities due to the religious conversions and strict laws against the same. There have been claims of increases in Islamophobia in Nepal by local Hindus and Buddhists as a result of the rise of Hindutva in India and the prejudice against Muslims by Hindus. However, this is reported to have had no effect in the community level, reflected by demands of Muslims to convert Nepal into a Hindu State. This is because they feel their religion is not threatened by the other and that they have shared in a spirit of brotherhood for decades. Both see the Expansion of Christianity as a common problem.

As a result, during the protests for Nepal re-declaration as a Hindu state, many Muslims supported the movement for Nepal as a हिंदू राष्ट्र (transl. Hindu nation).

=== Hinduism and Christianity ===
In Nepal, the relations between the Hindus and Christians have many often been a subject of controversy. The expansion of Christianity is a controversial subject in Nepal, and Nepali Christians have been subject to sporadic violence and widespread social exclusion by the local Hindus and Muslims. It is frequently claimed in Nepali media and political discourse that missionaries offer the poor material incentives to convert with necessary proof but these proofs are often left with no attention. There has been number of increase of conflicts between the Hindus and Christians of Nepal, due to the conversion of the poor and uneducated Hindus by the Christian Pastors and Missionaries. There have often been conflicts between the Hindus with Christians in Nepal, among the land and other cultural disputes. The Catholic Church of Nepal is one of the fastest growing churches in the world, due to which the population and demographics of the Hindus of Nepal is decreasing leading to the serious tensions between the two communities. There have been several incident reporting the conflicts between the two communities. The rise of Hindu nationalism in Nepal is seen as a threat on non-Sanatani religions in Nepal. The persecution(rare) mainly occurs as attacks on tribal people who converted to Christianity by other tribal people, destruction of churches and a ban on proselytization.

== Demographics ==
=== Historic population of Hindus ===
==== Percentage wise and historic change ====
| Year | Percent | Increase |
|---|---|---|
| 1952–54 | 88.87% | - |
| 1961 | 87.69% | -1.18% |
| 1971 | 89.39% | +1.70% |
| 1981 | 89.50% | +0.11% |
| 1991 | 86.51% | -2.99% |
| 2001 | 80.62% | -5.89% |
| 2011 | 81.34% | +0.72% |
| 2021 | 81.19% | -0.15% |

==== Growth rate ====
Historical Growth of the Hindu Population in Nepal
| Year | Pop. | ±% |
|---|---|---|
| 1952 | 7,318,392 | — |
| 1961 | 8,254,403 | +12.8% |
| 1971 | 10,330,009 | +25.1% |
| 1981 | 13,445,787 | +30.2% |
| 1991 | 15,996,653 | +19.0% |
| 2001 | 18,330,121 | +14.6% |
| 2011 | 21,551,492 | +17.6% |
| 2021 | 23,677,744 | +9.9% |
Source: 1952–2021

In 1952, the Hindu population of Nepal was 7,318,392 with the percentage of 88.87%. In recent years, the percentage of Hindus has decreased by nearly 7% from 88.87% in 1952 to 81.34%, as per 2011 census of Nepal. The Hindu population has experienced continuous decline in the population, which is mainly due to the low-fertility rate among the Nepali Hindus, which is also accompanied by diaspora of Nepalese to the United Kingdom, Hong Kong, India and Oman.

=== Hindu population by ethnic group ===
The figures are based on the 2011 Nepal census. NEG denotes newly listed ethnic group, for which 2001 Nepal census figures are not available.

| Caste | Race | Hindus (2011) | | Hindus (2021) | |
| Caste | Race | % | Pop. | % | Pop. |
|---|---|---|---|---|---|
| Chhetri/Kshetri | Khas | 99.25% | 4,398,053 | 99.24% | 4,760,865 |
| Brahmin (Hill)/Bahun | Khas | 99.56% | 3,226,903 | 99.67% | 3,382,134 |
| Magar | Sino-Tibetan | 78.96% | 1,887,733 | 78.75% | 1,585,744 |
| Tharu | Adivasi | 93.96% | 1,737,470 | 94.05% | 1,743,890 |
| Tamang | Sino/Tibetan | 9.1% | 1,539,830 | | |
| Newar | Sino/Tibetan and Indic Aryan | 87.38% | 1,321,933 | 89.05% | 1,194,502 |
| Kami | Hill Dalit | 96.35% | 1,258,554 | 95.51% | 1,403,942 |
| Yadav | Terai | 99.69% | 1,054,458 | 99.95% | 1,228,031 |
| Rai | Sino/Tibetan | 27.53% | 620,004 | | |
| Damai, Dholi | Hill Dalit | 96.59% | 472,862 | 95.95% | 543,026 |
| Gurung | Sino/Tibetan | 32.18% | 522,641 | | |
| Limbu | Sino/Tibetan | 14.34% | 387,300 | | |
| Thakuri | Khas | 19.31% | 425,623 | 99.12% | 490,120 |
| Sarki | Khas | 95.46% | 374,816 | | |
| Teli | Terai | 99.58% | 369,688 | 99.93% | 431,037 |
| Chamar | Khas | 99.55% | 335,893 | | |
| Koiri/kushwaha | Terai | 99.71% | 306,393 | 99.97% | 355,707 |
| Kurmi | Terai | 99.84% | 231,129 | | |
| Sanyasi | Khas | 99.05% | 227,822 | | |
| Dhanuk | Terai | 99.60% | 219,808 | | |
| Musahar | Khas | 99.10% | 234,490 | | |
| Dusadh | Khas | 99.67% | 208,910 | | |
| Sherpa | Sino/Tibetan | 0.00% | 112,946 | | |
| Sonar | Terai | 99.49% | 64,335 | | |
| Kewat | Terai | 99.75% | 153,772 | | |
| Brahman (Terai) | Terai | 99.53% | 134,106 | | |
| Kathbaniyan | Terai | 99.68% | 138,637 | | |
| Gharti, Bhujel | Sino/Tibetan | 97.60% | 118,650 | | |
| Mallah | Terai | 99.76% | 173,261 | | |
| Kalwar | Terai | 99.77% | 128,232 | | |
| Kumal | Sino/Tibetan | 98.25% | 121,196 | | |
| Hajam (Thakur) | Terai/Low | 99.66% | 117,758 | | |
| Kanu | Terai | 99.73% | 125,184 | | |
| Rajbansi | Adivasi | 98.90% | 115,242 | | |
| Sunuwar | Sino/Tibetan | 92.29% | 55,712 | | |
| Sudhi | Terai | 99.49% | 93,115 | | |
| Lohar | Terai | 99.54% | 101,421 | | |
| Tatma | Khas | 99.50% | 104,865 | | |
| Khatwe | Khas | 99.60% | 100,921 | | |
| Dhobi | Khas | 99.72% | 109,079 | | |
| Majhi | Sino/Tibetan | 81.98% | 83,727 | | |
| Nuniya | Terai | 99.82% | 70,540 | | |
| Kumhar | Terai | 99.58% | 62,399 | | |
| Danuwar | Sino/Tibetan | 83.66% | 84,115 | | |
| Chepang | Sino/Tibetan | 64.50% | 68,399 | | |
| Haluwai | Terai | 99.63% | 83,869 | | |
| Rajput | Terai | 99.61% | 41,972 | | |
| Kayastha | Terai | 99.62% | 44,304 | | |
| Badhaee | Terai | 99.59% | 28,932 | | |
| Marwadi | Other | 93.35% | 51,443 | | |
| Santhal | Adivasi | 76.99% | 51,735 | | |
| Jhangad | Adivasi | 81.50% | 37,424 | | |
| Bantar, Sardar | Khas | 99.16% | 55,104 | | |
| Baraee | Terai | 99.80% | 80,597 | | |
| Kahar | Terai | 99.49% | 53,159 | | |
| Gangai | Adivasi | 87.31% | 36,988 | | |
| Lodh | Terai | 98.43% | 32,837 | | |
| Bhumihar | Terai | | | 100% | 32,199 |
| Rajbhar | Terai | 99.66% | 9,542 | | |
| Rauniyar | Terai | | | 100% | 27,258 |
| Thami | Sino/Tibetan | 43.93% | 28,671 | | |
| Dhimal | Adivasi | 56.11% | 26,298 | | |
| Bhote | Sino/Tibetan | 0.00% | 13,397 | | |
| Bin | Terai/Low | 99.78% | 75,195 | | |
| Gaderi | Terai | 99.67% | 26,375 | | |
| Nurang | Sino/Tibetan | 0.00% | 278 | | |
| Yakkha | Sino/Tibetan | 11.50% | 24,336 | | |
| Darai | Sino/Tibetan | 94.94% | 16,789 | | |
| Tajpuriya | Adivasi | 77.20% | 19,213 | | |
| Thakali | Sino/Tibetan | 30.62% | 13,215 | | |
| Chidimar | Adivasi | 99.12% | 1,254 | | |
| Pahari | Sino/Tibetan | 91.18% | 13,615 | | |
| Mali | Terai | 99.67% | 14,995 | | |
| Bangali | Other | 99.07% | 26,582 | | |
| Chhantyal | Sino/Tibetan | 95.03% | 11,810 | | |
| Dom | Khas | 99.19% | 13,268 | | |
| Kamar | Terai | 99.89% | 1,787 | | |
| Bote | Sino/Tibetan | 88.04% | 10,397 | | |
| Brahmu | Sino/Tibetan | 79.59% | 8,140 | | |
| Gaine | Khas | 94.29% | 6,791 | | |
| Jirel | Sino/Tibetan | 17.37% | 5,774 | | |
| Dura | Sino/Tibetan | 99.37% | 5,394 | | |
| Badi | Khas | 95.95% | 38,603 | | |
| Meche | Adivasi | 75.59% | 4,867 | | |
| Lepcha | Sino/Tibetan | 9.55% | 3,445 | | |
| Halalkhor | Khas | 99.33% | 4,003 | 100% | 2,929 |
| Punjabi | Other | 91.04% | 7,176 | | |
| Kisan | Adivasi | 94.77% | 1,739 | | |
| Raji | Sino/Tibetan | 98.02% | 4,235 | | |
| Byangsi | Sino/Tibetan | 0.00% | 3,895 | | |
| Hayu | Sino/Tibetan | 47.62% | 2,925 | | |
| Koch | Adivasi | 94.62% | 1,635 | | |
| Dhunia | Terai | 99.48% | 14,846 | | |
| Walung | Sino/Tibetan | 0.00% | 1,249 | | |
| Munda | Adivasi | 97.06% | 2,350 | | |
| Raute | Sino/Tibetan | 96.28% | 618 | 100% | |
| Yehlmo | Sino/Tibetan | 0.00% | 10,752 | | |
| Khatik | Dalit | | | 100% | 9,152 |
| Patharkatta | Adivasi | 93.87% | 3,182 | 100% | 3,343 |
| Beldar | Terai | | | 100% | 3,037 |
| Kusunda | Sino/Tibetan | 82.78% | 273 | | |
| Lhomi | Sino/Tibetan | 0.00% | 1,614 | | |
| Kalar | Khas | 99.26% | 1,077 | | |
| Natuwa | Dalit | 99.74% | 3,062 | | |
| Dhandi | Khas | 100.00% | 1,982 | | |
| Dhankar | Khas | 99.59% | 2,681 | 100% | 4,090 |
| Kulung | Sino/Tibetan | 2.27% | 28,613 | | |
| Ghale | Sino/Tibetan | 35.96% | 22,881 | | |
| Khawas | Sino/Tibetan | 87.61% | 18,513 | | |
| Rajdhob | Terai | 99.78% | 13,422 | | |
| Kori | Khas | 99.98% | 12,276 | | |
| Nachhiring | Sino/Tibetan | 3.17% | 7,154 | | |
| Yamphu | Sino/Tibetan | 7.05% | 6,933 | | |
| Chamling | Sino/Tibetan | 28.70% | 6,668 | | |
| Aathpariya | Sino/Tibetan | 5.86% | 5,977 | | |
| Sarbaria | Khas | 99.55% | 4,906 | | |
| Bantaba | Sino/Tibetan | 42.66% | 4,604 | | |
| Dolpo | Sino/Tibetan | 0.00% | 4,107 | | |
| Amat | Terai | 99.11% | 3,830 | | |
| Thulung | Sino/Tibetan | 17.45% | 3,535 | | |
| Mewahang | Sino/Tibetan | 10.23% | 3,100 | | |
| Bahing | Sino/Tibetan | 14.73% | 3,096 | | |
| Lhopa | Sino/Tibetan | 0.27% | 2,624 | | |
| Dev | Terai | 99.44% | 2,147 | | |
| Samgpang | Sino/Tibetan | 25.34% | 1,681 | | |
| Khaling | Sino/Tibetan | 20.88% | 1,571 | | |
| Topkegola | Sino/Tibetan | 0.00% | 1,523 | 0.00% | 642 |
| Loharung | Sino/Tibetan | 10.15% | 1,153 | | |
| Fri | Janjati | Newly added | | 100% | 921 |
| Khas Oth | Khas | 97.86% | 155,354 | | |
| Janajati Others | Sino/Tibetan | 70.36% | 1,228 | | |
| Terai Oth | Terai | 98.91% | 103,811 | | |
| Undefined | Other | 70.32% | 15,277 | | |
| Foreigner | Other | 67.22% | 6,651 | | |

As seen from the 2001 and 2011 Census data, the percentage of Hindus has gone up by 0.72%, from 80.62% to 81.34%. However, the overall trend remains largely negative. All the major racial group except the Sino/Tibetans showed a decline in the percentage of Hindus, which was especially sharp among certain Adivasi groups such as Tharu. Among the Sino/Tibetans, the percentage of Hindus went up by 2.37%, from 49.74% to 52.11%.

=== Hindu population by regions ===
The figures are based on 2011 Nepal census and 2021 Nepal census.

==== Province wise population ====
| Province | Total pop 2011 | Hindu pop 2011 | Total pop 2021 | Hindu pop 2021 | Hinduism Map 2011 | Hindu % 2011 | Hindu % 2021 |
|---|---|---|---|---|---|---|---|
| Koshi Province | 4,534,943 | 3,021,632 | 4,961,412 | 3,343,183 | | 66.63% | 67.38% |
| Madhesh Province | 5,404,145 | 4,580,012 | 6,114,600 | 5,151,005 | | 84.75% | 84.24% |
| Bagmati Province | 5,529,452 | 3,969,040 | 6,116,866 | 4,406,030 | | 71.78% | 72.03% |
| Gandaki Province | 2,403,757 | 1,992,474 | 2,466,427 | 2,027,990 | | 82.89% | 82.22% |
| Lumbini Province | 4,499,272 | 3,998,053 | 5,122,078 | 4,525,623 | | 88.86% | 88.35% |
| Karnali Province | 1,570,418 | 1,497,236 | 1,688,412 | 1,598,437 | | 95.34% | 94.67% |
| Sudurpashchim Province | 2,552,517 | 2,481,812 | 2,694,783 | 2,625,476 | | 97.23% | 97.42% |
| Total | 26,494,504 | 21,551,492 | 29,164,578 | 23,677,744 | | 81.34% | 81.19% |

==== District wise population ====
| District | Hindus % | |
| District | 2011 | 2021 |
|---|---|---|
| Baitadi | 99.93% | 100% |
| Kalikot | 99.8 | 99.79% |
| Bajhang | 99.74% | 99.7% |
| Achham | 99.43% | 99.14% |
| Doti | 99.04% | 99% |
| Jajarkot | 98.96% | 98.65 |
| Dadeldhura | 98.88% | 98.2 |
| Darchula | 98.88% | 99.8 |
| Bajura | 98.68% | 98.71 |
| Jumla | 97.89% | 97.29 |
| Salyan | 97.71% | 95.88 |
| Dailekh | 97.40% | 95.91 |
| Arghakhanchi | 97.03% | 98.27 |
| Gulmi | 96.78% | 96.57 |
| Pyuthan | 96.61% | 96.47 |
| Rukum(East) | 96.51% | 79.03 |
| Rukum(West) | 96.51% | 97.53 |
| Dang | 96.46% | 95.33 |
| Kanchanpur | 95.09% | 95.53 |
| Kailali | 94.91% | 95.91 |
| Bardiya | 94.17% | 93.40 |
| Surkhet | 91.86% | 91.60 |
| Mugu | 91.64% | 91.77 |
| Palpa | 90.52% | 91.39 |
| Syangja | 90.21% | 86.35 |
| Siraha | 90.19% | 90.27 |
| Parbat | 89.48% | 92.70 |
| Dhanusa | 89.35% | 88.98 |
| Baglung | 89.27% | 91.30 |
| Nawalparasi(east) | 88.18% | 87.13 |
| Nawalparasi(west) | 88.18% | 87.58 |
| Bhaktapur | 87.85% | 86.40 |
| Myagdi | 87.16% | 87.55 |
| Tanahu | 86.51% | 84.08 |
| Rupandehi | 86.24% | 87.02 |
| Saptari | 85.73% | 88.47 |
| Sarlahi | 85.56% | 85.69 |
| Rolpa | 85.17% | 87.48 |
| Mahottari | 84.24% | 82.67 |
| Parsa | 83.10% | 80.84 |
| Kaski | 82.33% | 81.11 |
| Bara | 81.73% | 80.89 |
| Humla | 81.62% | 87.44 |
| Chitwan | 81.40% | 81.42 |
| Kapilbastu | 80.62% | 80.70 |
| Morang | 80.27% | 81.47 |
| Kathmandu | 80.01% | 78.4 |
| Jhapa | 79.88% | 79.09 |
| Banke | 78.42% | 78.90 |
| Rautahat | 77.77% | 75.71 |
| Gorkha | 75.15% | 69.95 |
| Lalitpur | 73.53% | 74.69 |
| Sunsari | 73.28% | 74.34 |
| Udayapur | 72.57% | 70.37 |
| Dhading | 72.42% | 70.71 |
| Ramechhap | 71.93% | 70.65 |
| Okhaldhunga | 70.76% | 64.95 |
| Dolpa | 70.15% | 70.62 |
| Dolakha | 67.80% | 66.47 |
| Sindhuli | 64.47% | 68.23 |
| Lamjung | 63.98% | 62.44 |
| Kavrepalanchok | 62.57% | 63.30 |
| Sindhupalchok | 58.98% | 54.16 |
| Khotang | 58.78% | 52.20 |
| Nuwakot | 57.77% | 56.97 |
| Bhojpur | 53.33% | 46.38 |
| Terhathum | 52.17% | 50.95 |
| Dhankuta | 49.17% | 49.56 |
| Makwanpur | 48.26% | 48.72 |
| Ilam | 44.49% | 44.19 |
| Sankhuwasabha | 42.73% | 40.42 |
| Solukhumbu | 40.21% | 37.74 |
| Manang | 39.19% | 40.68 |
| Mustang | 37.47% | 38.14 |
| Taplejung | 35.90% | 30.44 |
| Panchthar | 34.31% | 29.20 |
| Rasuwa | 25.38% | 25.60 |

== Laws for religious affairs ==
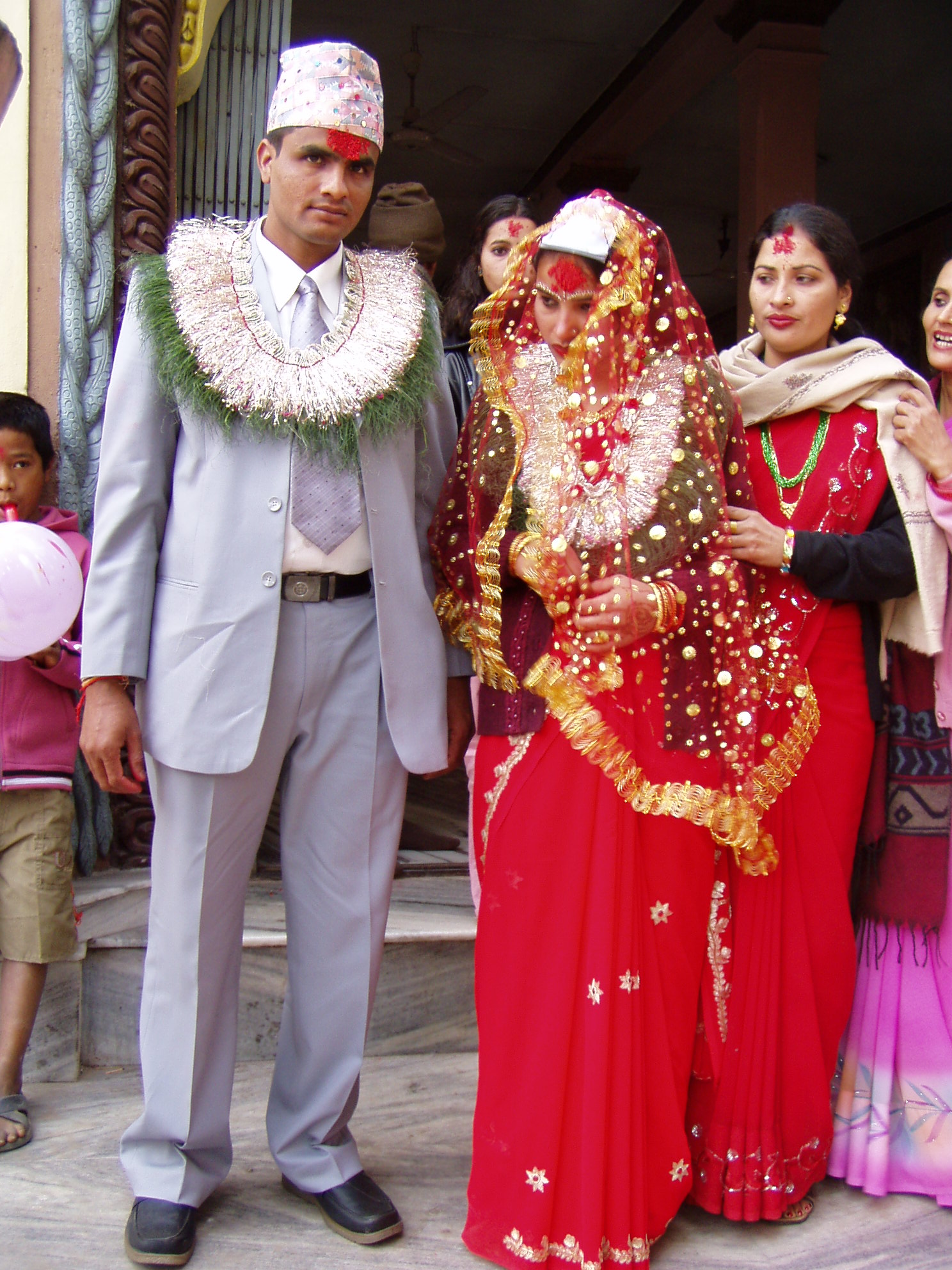
Nepali Hindu marriage at Narayangadh, Chitwan

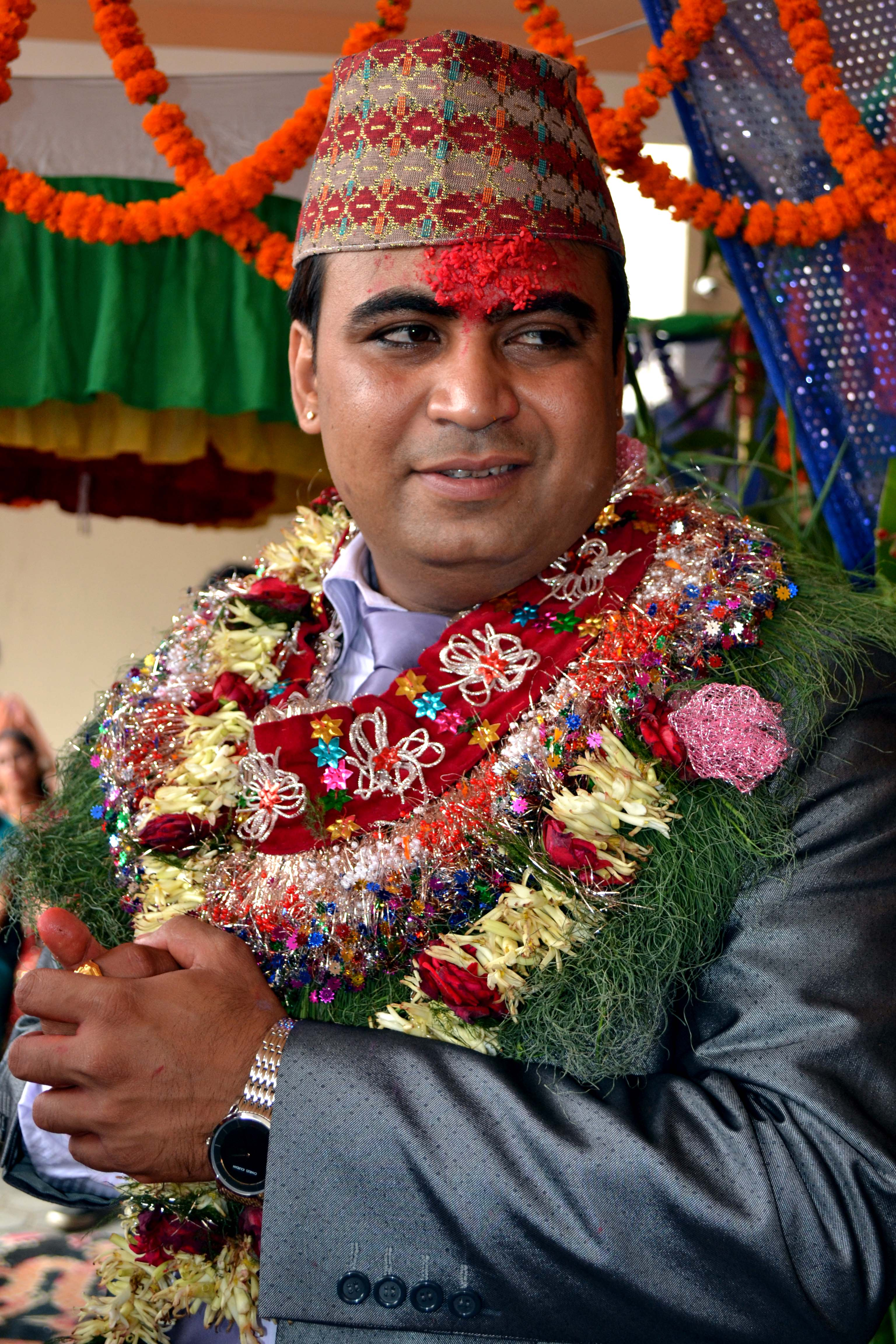
Nepali Hindu groom

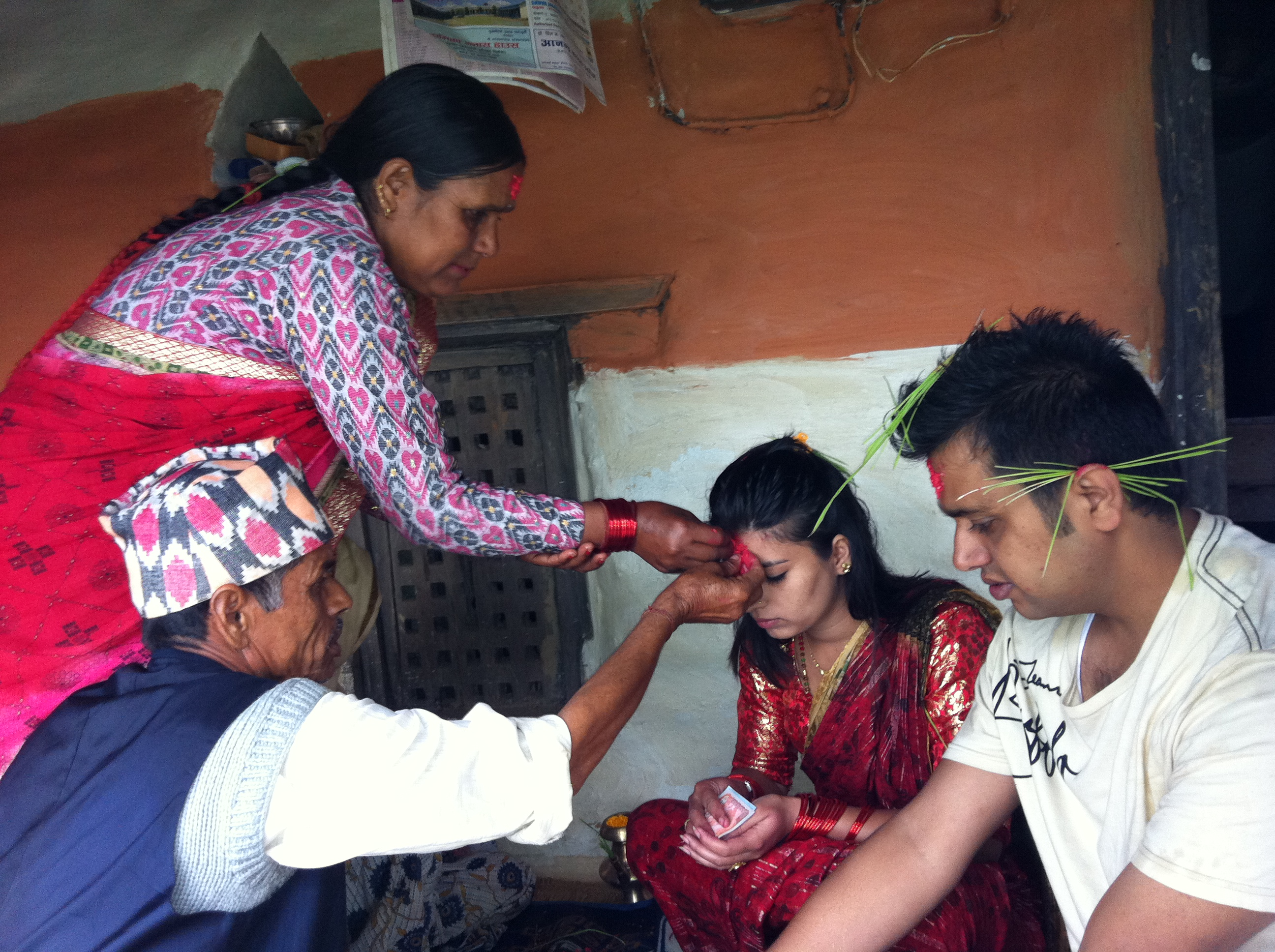
Seniors offering Dashain Tika to junior

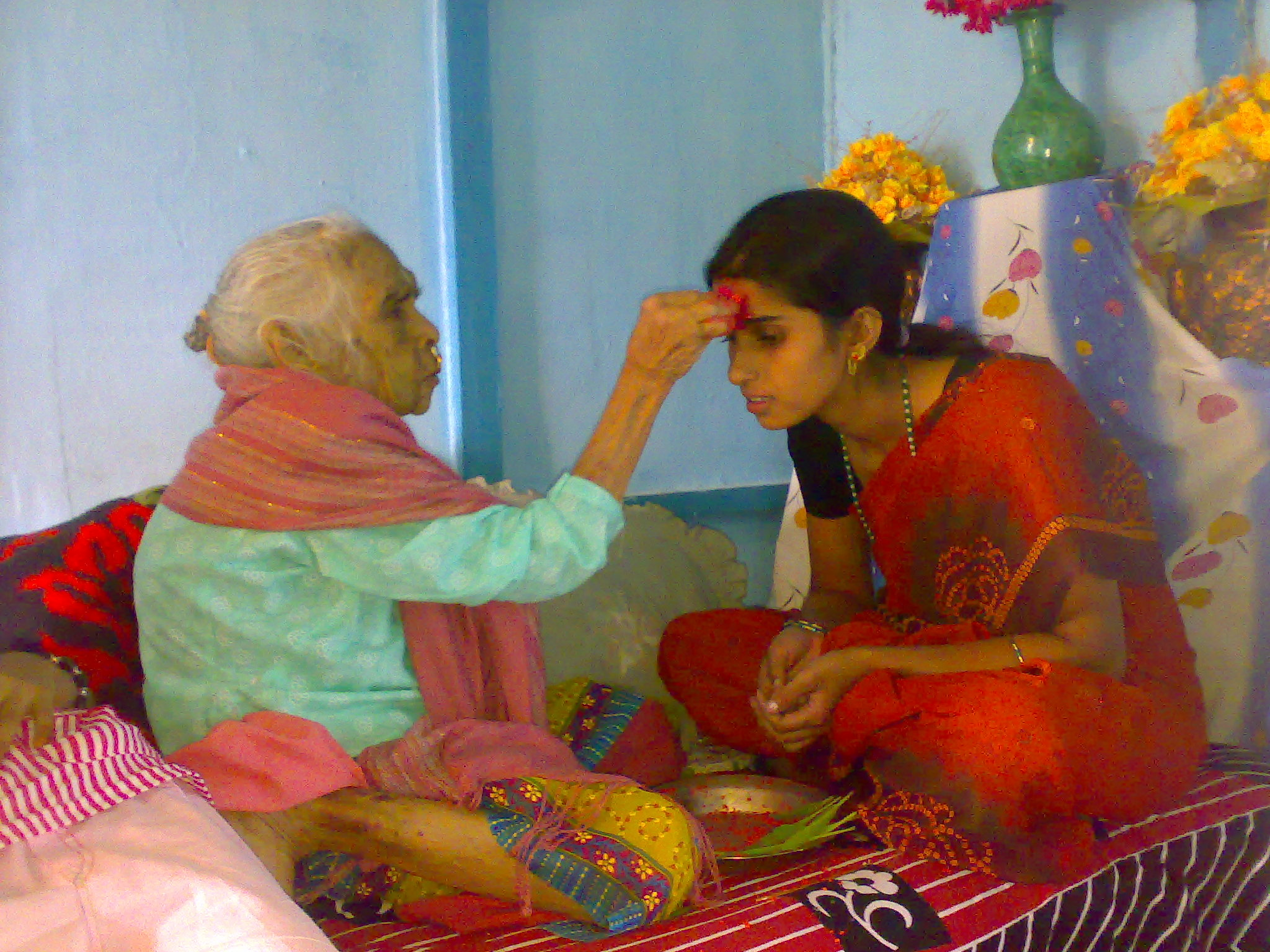
Senior offering Dashain Tika to junior

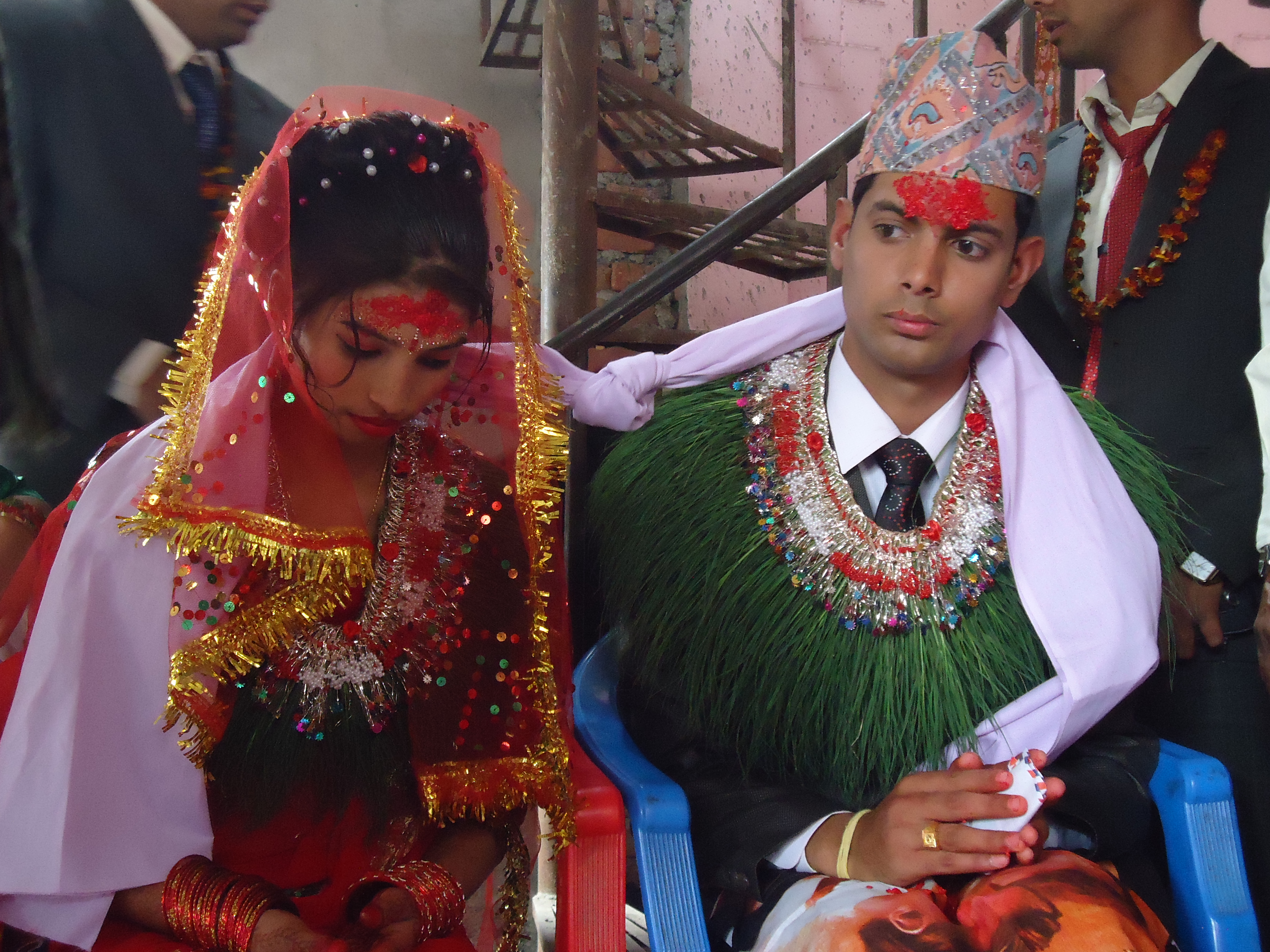
Nepali Hindu bride and groom

Currently, Nepal is a secular country, as declared by the Constitution of Nepal 2072 (Part 1, Article 4), where secularism 'means religious, cultural freedom, along with the protection of religion, culture handed down from time immemorial (सनातन)'. Nepal remained the last Hindu nation until 2008, and still Nepal has a Hindu majority population. It has the highest Hindu population in the world, after India. By percentage, Nepal has the highest Hindu population in the world. Although many government policies throughout history have disregarded or marginalized minority religions, Nepalese societies generally enjoy religious tolerance and harmony among all religions, with only isolated incidents of religiously motivated violence. Nepal's constitution does not give anyone the right to convert any person to another religion. Nepal also passed a more stringent anti-conversion law in 2017.

== Sources ==
- Birkenholtz, Jessica Vantine (2018). Reciting the Goddess: Narratives of Place and the Making of Hinduism in Nepal. Oxford University Press. ISBN 978-0-19-934116-0.
- Books, Dms (2019). Hinduism: Religion Dharma India Nepal Pattern 2020 Planner Calendar Organizer Daily Weekly Monthly. Independently Published. ISBN 978-1-7975-6024-3.
- Fisher, James F., ed. (1978). Himalayan anthropology: the Indo-Tibetan interface. Mouton. ISBN 978-9027977007.
- Hutt, Michael, ed. (2004). Himalayan 'people's War': Nepal's Maoist Rebellion. C. Hurst & Co. ISBN 978-1-85065-722-4.
- Power Places of Kathmandu: Hindu and Buddhist Holy Sites in the Sacred Valley of Nepal. Inner Traditions/Bear. 1995. ISBN 978-0-89281-540-1.
- Sharma, Sudheer (2019). The Nepal Nexus: An Inside Account of the Maoists, the Durbar and New Delhi. Penguin Random House India Private Limited. ISBN 978-93-5305-662-9.
- Tree, Isabella (2014). The Living Goddess: A Journey into the Heart of Kathmandu. Penguin Books Limited. ISBN 978-93-5118-610-6.
- Gellner, D.; Pfaff-Czarnecka, J.; Whelpton, J. (2012). Nationalism and Ethnicity in a Hindu Kingdom: The Politics and Culture of Contemporary Nepal. Routledge. ISBN 978-1-136-64956-1.
- Grieve, G. (2006). Retheorizing Religion in Nepal. Springer. ISBN 978-0-230-60147-5.
- Barua, Ankur (2015). Debating 'Conversion' in Hinduism and Christianity. Routledge. ISBN 978-1-317-53859-2.
- Levy, Robert I. (1990). Mesocosm: Hinduism and the Organization of a Traditional Newer City in Nepal. University of California Press.
- Lecomte-Tilouine, Marie (2011). Hindu Kingship, Ethnic Revival, and the Maoist Rebellion in Nepal. OUP India. ISBN 978-0-19-807225-6.
- Michaels, Axel (2004). Hinduism: Past and Present. Princeton University Press. ISBN 978-0-691-08953-9.
- Gittinger, Juli L. (2018). Hinduism and Hindu Nationalism Online. Routledge. ISBN 978-1-351-10363-3.
- Maharjan, Mangal Man (2002). Comparative Study of Hinduism and Christianity in Nepal. Ekta Books. ISBN 978-99933-1-852-1.
- Dharam Vir (1988). Education and Polity in Nepal: An Asian Experiment. Northern Book Centre. ISBN 978-81-85119-39-7.
- Borgström, Bengt-Erik (1980), The patron and the panca: village values and pancayat democracy in Nepal, Vikas House, ISBN 9780706909975
- Landon, Perceval (1928). Nepal, Vol. 1. Public Resource. Constable & Co. (Edinburgh). ISBN 8-120-60724-4 – via Internet Archive. Sijapati, Megan Adamson; Birkenholtz, Jessica Vantine (2016). Religion and Modernity in the Himalaya. Routledge. ISBN 978-1-317-33386-9.
- Jain, Pankaj (2016). Dharma and Ecology of Hindu Communities: Sustenance and Sustainability. Routledge. ISBN 978-1-317-15160-9.
- Chatterjee, Chhanda (2020). Syama Prasad Mookerjee, the Hindu Dissent and the Partition of Bengal, 1932–1947. Routledge. ISBN 978-1-000-16378-0.
- Rodrigues, Hillary P. (2012). Studying Hinduism in Practice. Routledge. ISBN 978-1-136-68097-7.
- Malla, Kamal Prakash (1989). Nepal: Perspectives on Continuity and Change. Centre for Nepal and Asian Studies, Tribhuvan University.
- Toffin, Gerard; Pfaff-Czarnecka, Joanna (2014). Facing Globalization in the Himalayas: Belonging and the Politics of the Self. Sage Publications India. ISBN 978-93-5150-048-3.

== See also ==
- Newar Hinduism
