= Irreligion in Nepal =

Irreligion in Nepal is the extent of irreligion, or lack, indifference to or rejection of religious faith in the country. Hinduism in Nepal is the predominant faith, and irreligious people seemingly form a minority in Nepal. However, this is due to "irreligion" not being an option in the Nepalese census which has historically led to an underrepresentation of atheist and agnostic groups in Nepal.

== Communism and atheism ==
Many communist leaders in Nepal represent themselves as atheist or agnostic.
