= Jainism in Nepal =

Nepalese Jains
Total population
- 3,214

Languages
- Nepali; Indian Languages

Religion
- Jainism

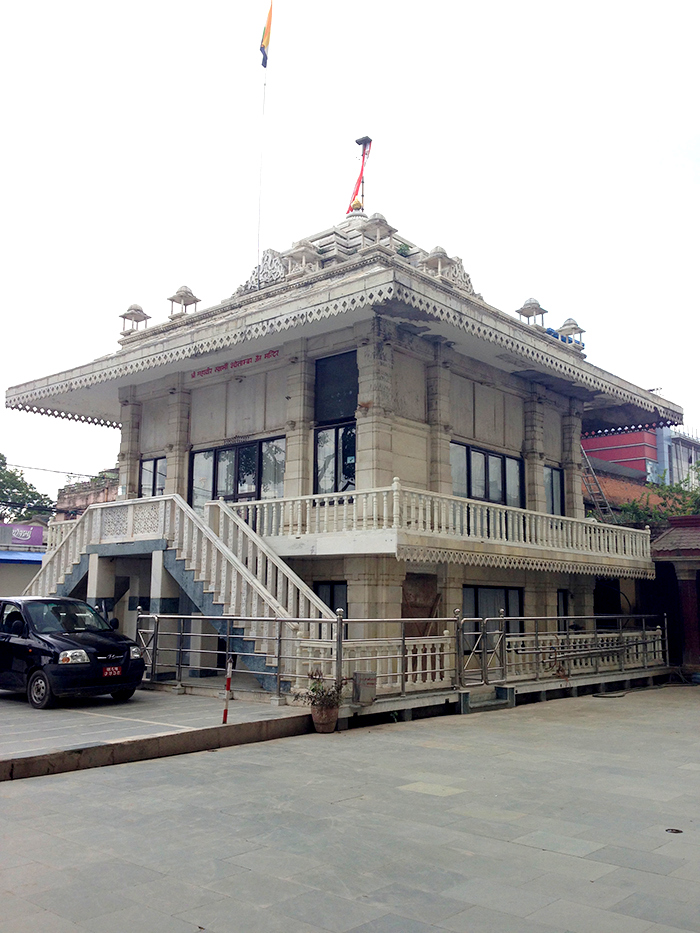
The Jain temple in Kathmandu, Nepal

The followers of Jainism are a minority community in Nepal. According to the 2011 Nepalese census, there are 3,214 Jains in Nepal, down from 4,108 in 2001. There is a Jain temple in Kathmandu, Nepal.

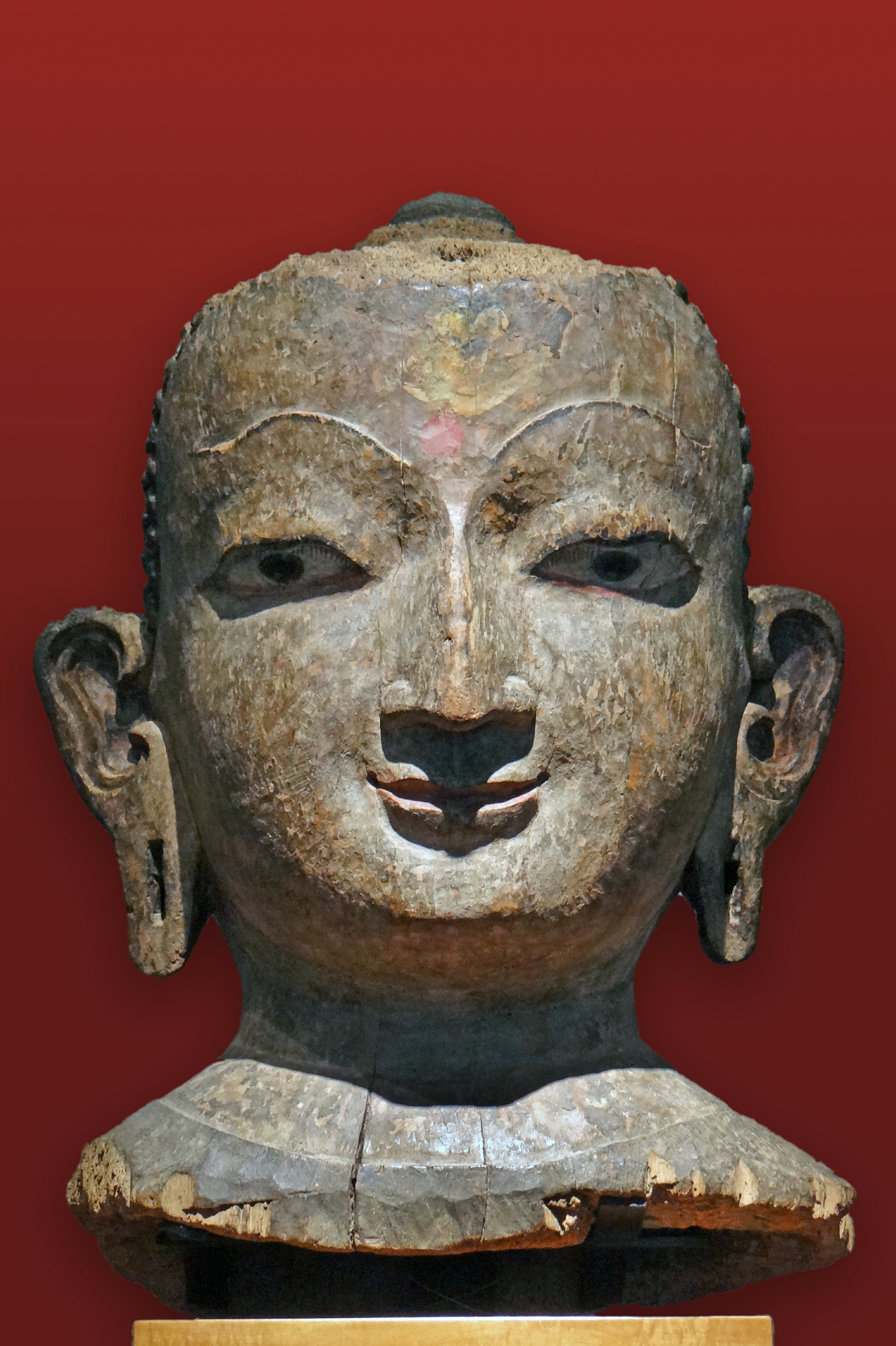
An image of Jina. 18th-century wood with traces of polychromy in National Museum of Asian Art - Guimet Room Nepal

== History ==
Bhadrabahu, the last Jain ascetic to have complete knowledge of Jain scriptures, was in Nepal for a 12-year penitential vow when the Pataliputra conference took place in 300 BCE to put together the Jain canon anew.

== Jain society ==
The Jain society inaugurated the Lord Mahaveer Jain Niketan in 1979. The pratishtha for the Jain temple was performed in 1996.

Large number of Jains live in Morang (970 people), Kathmandu (829 people), Sunsari District (388 people), Jhapa (248 people) and Saptari (188 people).

== Jain unity ==
Jains in Nepal practice Jain unity, akin to American Jain unity, Digambar or Svetambara, speaking any language could become a member and carry out Jain religious activities, keeping to fundamental principles of Jainism. The Jain temple consists of different floors for different sects.

== See also ==
- Religion in Nepal
