= Freedom of religion in Nepal =

नेपाल Nepal
- Flag

- Capital: Kathmandu
- Official languages: Nepali
- Religion (2011 census): 81.3% Hinduism; 9.0% Buddhism; 4.4% Islam; 3.0% Kirant; 1.4% Christianity

Population
  - Estimate: 30 million
- Minority groups (Tibetan Buddhists, Dalits) report additional local barriers. Restrictions: Proselytism and conversion prohibited; Foreign missionary registration restricted

Nepal is constitutionally a secular republic under the Constitution of Nepal 2015, which defines secularism as the “protection of religion and culture handed down from time immemorial” and guarantees the right of individuals and communities to profess, practice, and preserve their faiths without state favoritism toward any religion.

The 2015 Constitution and the subsequent 2017 Penal Code prohibit proselytism and the conversion of others, imposing penalties of up to five years’ imprisonment or fines, though personal conversion and private worship remain protected.

With a population of approximately 30 million, Nepal's religious demography is dominated by Hinduism (81.3 %), followed by Buddhism (9.0 %), Islam (4.4 %), the indigenous Kirant faith (3.0 %), and Christianity (1.4 %), alongside smaller communities of Agnostics, Jains, Sikhs, and Baha’is.

While the Government generally respects religious practice, national laws restricting proselytism have led to concerns among Christian and Muslim groups about discriminatory enforcement and limitations on religious literature and organizational registration.

Minority communities—particularly Tibetan Buddhists and Dalits—face additional obstacles, including restrictions on public ceremonies and caste-based discrimination at places of worship, despite constitutional guarantees against such practices.

In 2023, Nepal was scored 2 out of 4 for overall religious freedom, reflecting both its constitutional protections and the practical challenges posed by anti‑conversion laws and social discrimination.

== Background ==
The Constitution provides for freedom to practice one's religion. The Constitution also specifically denies the right to convert another person. The now-defunct constitution of 1990, which was in effect until 15 January 2007, described the country as a "Hindu Kingdom". The Government generally did not interfere with the practice of other religious groups, and religious tolerance was broadly observed; however, there were some restrictions.

Adherents of the country's many religious groups generally coexisted peacefully. Nepal is viewed as a religiously harmonious place for its state of development.

Nepal's Penal Code Section 158, adopted on 2015, states that no person has the right to convert anyone person to another religion. Nepal also passed more stringent anti-conversion law on 2017.

== Religious demography ==
The country has an area of 147,516 square kilometres (56,956 sq mi) and a population of 28 million. Hinduism is reported to be the religion of 81.34% of the population followed by Buddhism (9.04%), Islam(4.38%), Kirant (an indigenous animist religion)(3.04%), and Christianity (1.41%). There are adherents to many other religious groups, whose proportion is small. Twenty thousand Tibetan Buddhist refugees reside in the country.

== Status of religious freedom ==
=== Legal and policy framework ===
The Interim Constitution provides for freedom of religion and permits the practice of all religious groups; however, there are some restrictions. The Interim Parliament declared the country a secular state in the Interim Constitution in January 2007. The previous constitution described the country as a "Hindu Kingdom," although it did not establish Hinduism as the state religion. Article 23 of the Interim Constitution protects the rights of all religious groups by guaranteeing the individual the right "to profess and practice his/her own religion as handed down to him/her from ancient times having due regard to traditional practices." It also states "no person shall be entitled to convert another person from one religion to another and shall not take actions or behave in a way that would create disturbance in another's religion."

The Interim Constitution maintains the stipulation from the 1990 constitution that no one can be discriminated against based on caste. In 2002 the previous government constituted a National Dalit Commission charged with protecting and promoting Dalit (formerly called "untouchable") rights and ensuring active participation of the Dalit community in the development of the country. Before the People's Movement in April 2006, which led to removal of the King and his government, the Commission devised legal and policy arrangements for Dalit rights, made recommendations to implement international conventions to which the country is a party, monitored and coordinated non-governmental organizations (NGOs) on efforts to uplift Dalits, and launched programs on social awareness to end social discrimination and untouchability. After the success of the People's Movement, many members of the Commission were accused of being royalist and resigned, and the Commission was unable to function. The Interim Government nominated 16 members to the Commission on 3 June 2007.

There are no specific laws favoring the Hindu majority, nor does the Government control the expression of Hinduism.

Although there were no registration requirements for religious groups, there were legal registration requirements for NGOs. Organizations had been prohibited from registering if their names contained religious words. However, this began to change in April 2007 when the Government allowed the registration of an organization with the word "Bible" in its title. Christian, Muslim, and Jewish religious organizations claimed that, unless registered, such organizations were restricted from owning land, an important step for establishing churches, mosques, synagogues, or burial sites. An organization that provides religious services and kosher foods to Jewish adherents (generally tourists) complained that the organization was not able to legally register as a religious organization and its workers had to enter the country on business visas.

Proselytizing remained illegal. There are officially no foreign missionaries; however, for decades dozens of Christian missionary hospitals, welfare organizations, and schools have operated in the country. These organizations did not proselytize, and otherwise operated freely. Missionary schools were among the most respected institutions of secondary education; many members of the governing and business elite graduated from Jesuit high schools. Foreign workers in the missionary hospitals and schools entered the country with visas designating them as technical workers for local or international NGOs sponsoring the hospitals and schools. The Government enforced these immigration laws; if foreign workers were found to proselytize, they were expelled from the country. There were no expulsions during the reporting period. Many foreign Christian organizations had direct ties to local churches and sponsored pastors for religious training abroad.

In 2021, the government continued to permit Hindu, Buddhist, and Muslim groups to establish and operate their own schools, although many madrassahs are unregistered. The government provided the same level of funding for both registered religious schools and public schools, but Christian organizations stated the law prohibiting private Christian schools from registering as public schools was discriminatory.

Some holy days, most of them Hindu, were recognized as national holidays. These were Mahashivaratri, Buddha Jayanti, Falgun Purnima, Krishna Asthami, Dasain, and Tihar.

Although public schools did not teach religion, most had a statue of Saraswati, the Hindu goddess of knowledge, on their grounds. Many began the day with a Hindu prayer to the goddess.

The Government had no formal policy on interfaith understanding. A local NGO, the Interreligious Council of Nepal, consisting of representatives of the Hindu, Buddhist, Muslim, Christian, and Baha'i faiths, was active in promoting peace in the country.

=== Clause 180 ===
Nepal's new constitution adopted on 2015 gives no person the right to convert anyone person to another religion. Nepal also passed more stringent Anti conversion law on 2017. Clause 180 of section 9 of the ‘Bill designed to amend and integrate prevalent laws relating to Criminal Offense’ states that:

1. Nobody should convert the religion of another person or indulge in such act or encourage such an act.

2. Nobody should indulge in any act or conduct so as to undermine the religion, faith or belief that any caste, ethnic group or community has been observing since sanatan [eternal] times or to jeopardize it with or without any incitement to convert to any other religion, or preach such religion or faith with any such intention.

3. Anyone committing the offense as per sub-clause (1) and (2) shall face up to five years of imprisonment and fine of up to fifty thousand rupees.

4. If a foreigner is found to have committed the crime as per sub-clause (1) and (2), he/she will have to be sent out of Nepal within seven days of completion of the sentence as per this clause.

=== Restrictions on religious freedom ===
Tibetan Buddhists faced various restrictions on their celebrations. Local authorities generally restricted celebration of Tibetan religious festivals to private property. Police in Kathmandu prohibited Tibetans celebrating the New Year from carrying pictures of the Dalai Lama around an important Buddhist temple as part of religious ceremonies. The Government also restricted all other non-religious local Tibetan celebrations (Tibetan New Year, the Dalai Lama's birthday, and Democracy Day) to private property. On 10 March 2007, however, the Tibetan community was allowed to march freely in the street, demanding "freedom and justice for Tibet." During the reporting period, the Government revoked the legally obtained registration of a welfare office to look after Tibetan refugees (a lawsuit was pending at the end of the reporting period) and did not allow the registration of an office to represent the Dalai Lama. The welfare office previously looked after more than 20,000 Tibetan refugees who left their homeland after the Dalai Lama fled Tibet in 1959.

The law prohibits converting others and proselytizing; these activities are punishable by fines, imprisonment, or, for foreigners, expulsion. However, personal conversion is allowed. Some Christian and Muslim groups were concerned that the ban on proselytizing limited the expression of non-Hindu religious belief. NGOs or individuals were allowed to file reports that individuals or organizations were proselytizing, and the Government investigated these reports.

There were no incidents of punishment for conversion or proselytism during the reporting period.

Madrassahs, but not mosques, are required to register with local district administration offices (part of the Home Ministry) and supply information about their funding sources to operate; they receive no government funding. Some Muslim leaders criticized the move as discriminatory; however, the registration requirement has not been enforced. Muslims were not restricted from participating in the Hajj, although the Government did not subsidize the pilgrimage.

The Constitution prohibits discrimination on the basis of caste; however, the caste system strongly influences society. While the Government has stressed that caste-based discrimination is illegal and temple access for "lower castes" has improved in some areas, caste discrimination was frequently practiced at Hindu temples, and in 2021 Dalits were still forbidden from, and punished for, trying to enter the buildings.

There were no restrictions on the selling or possession of religious literature.

Civil servants may take off religious holidays and celebrate them on private property without government interference.

There were no reports of religious prisoners or detainees.

=== Forced religious conversion ===
There have been frequent reports alleging that various missionaries and foreign Christian organizations have lured poor people to change their religion by offering them jobs and money. Multiple claims and proof for these allegations have been brought forward. Such charges have long been leveled against Christians in south Asia. The charges have sometimes brought tensions in societies, where the newly converted are claimed to have been brainwashed.

=== In rebel-held areas during the Nepalese Civil War ===
During the Nepalese Civil War, Maoist insurgents restricted religious freedom in parts of the country. There were reports of Maoists enforcing a "people's calendar" in schools that did not allow for religious holidays. Maoists sometimes demanded the use of religious facilities for their political organizations and courts.

Christian organizations reported several cases where Maoists extorted cash from churches. In September 2004 Maoist threats prompted the temporary closing of 21 churches in Sankhuwasabha District. In October 2006 local leaders closed the Christian Kashi Gaun Church in Kashi village, Gorkha in response to pressure from local religious Lamas who were concerned that people would abandon their traditional religious beliefs. Members of the Nepal Interreligious Council visited Gorkha and met with religious and district leaders, and the government agreed to reopen the church in February 2007.

It was confirmed by the vice president of Nepal Interreligious Council that Dr. K. B. Rokaya together with others (Ramchandra and Phanindra) visited Gorkha in February 2018. After having a dialogue held at Gorkha with the representative of the government and others agreed to open all the churches. One of the churches which was recently built in Ranxi village and padlocked by Maoist leader was also opened. Similarly, for the cases of Sankhuwasabha, Rokaya met Maoist leader Krishna Bahdur Mohara in Delhi, and immediately after the meeting Mohara phoned the person charge in Sankhusabha/Panchthar and all the closed churches was open. Rokaya also confirmed that although there was a presence of Interreligious council but was not organized and active at that time and he had led the group on behalf of the NCCN (National Christian Church Nepal)

There were scattered reports of Maoist insurgents attacking Hindu temples and harassing Hindu priests. On 21 August 2006, a group of Maoists disrupted a religious function organized by a pro-Hindu organization in Bhairahawa, accusing the group of attempting to reestablish the monarchy. On 21 September 2005, a group of armed Maoists attacked and vandalized Ramchandra Temple in Muga village of Dhankuta District.

== Atheists in Nepal ==
The Atheist population in Nepal is emerging. Although at a technical level, the roots of atheism were established by the Communist parties (United Mission league and Maoists), they themselves were more or less influenced by a cultural bias of favoritism to Hinduism. Though, Hinduism is a very wide religion that grants enough grounds for other faiths, including atheism, recognizing Nepal as a Hindu state was humiliating to adherents of other faiths. So became the driving force for the establishment of a secular state following the people's movement in 2006 AD.

== International view ==
Although the constitution recognises Nepal as a secular state, this is seen as restrictive, inconsistent with the international human rights framework, prejudiced against minority religions and legitimising discrimination on the basis of religion. Article 4 of the Constitution defines ‘secular’ as protection of religion and culture handed down from the time immemorial.”; a past Supreme Court judgement has interpreted this to mean protection of Hinduism.

Anti-proselytization laws are set in Article 4 of the constitution, but are seen to be in violation of the right to freedom of religion. Observers cite the example Pastor Keshav Raj Acharya of Abundant Harvest Church was sentenced in 2021 to the maximum legal punishment of two years in prison and a fine of 20,000 Nepali rupees after being found guilty of proselytization. Local monitoring groups accused the police of discriminatory practices during this case. In July 2021 Nepal refused to support the Universal Periodic Review recommendation by the Netherlands to amend Article 26 of the constitution to include the right to choose or change one's religion or belief, in accordance with Article 18 of the ICCPR.

It is also noted that Christians, Muslims, Jains, Buddhists, Baha’is and other religious minority groups cannot register their places of worship as religious organisations. They are obliged to register the buildings either as non-governmental organisations (NGOs) under the NGO Act 2034, or as individually-owned properties, which restricts activities in those buildings.

There has also been increased monitoring and investigation by police of Tibetan Buddhist religious celebrations. Nepali Buddhist monks are often mistaken for Tibetans, and face harassment and discrimination on account of their distinctive robes.

In 2022, there were still many reports of individuals being arrested, imprisoned and fined during their expression of religious freedom; this was mainly in regard to proselytizing or breaking the law on killing cattle.

== See also ==
- Religion in Nepal
- Human rights in Nepal
- Banishment of Buddhist monks from Nepal
