= Holi celebration in Nepal =

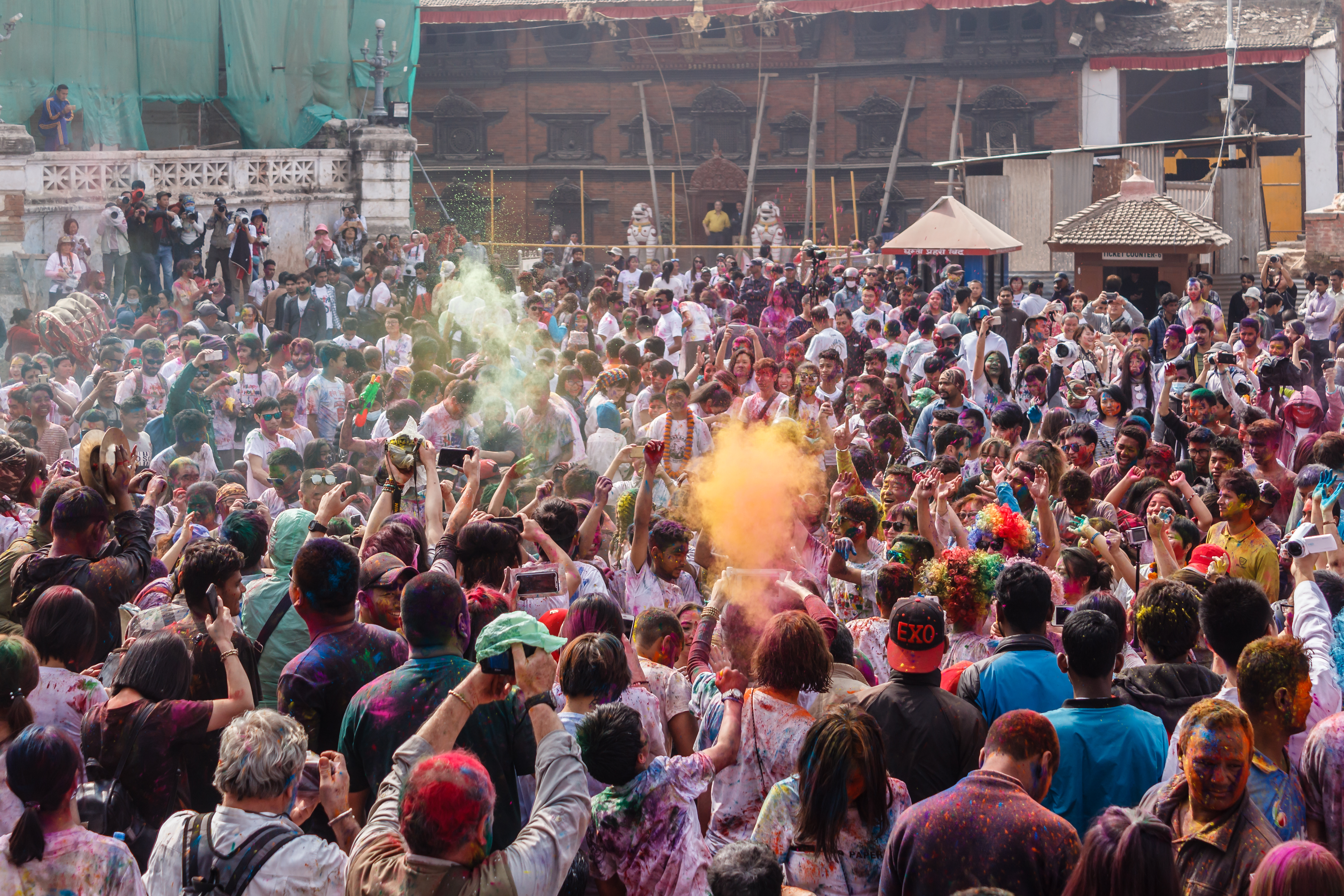
Locals celebrating Holi in Kathmandu Durbar Square, Nepal

Holi, also known as Phagu Purnima, along with many other Hindu festivals, is celebrated in Nepal as a national festival. It is a major Nepal-wide festival along with Dashain and Tihar (Dipawali). It is celebrated in the Nepali month of Falgun (the Terai region celebrates on the same date as Indian Holi, while the rest of the country celebrates it a day earlier), and signifies the legends of the Hindu god Krishna. They worship Saraswati shrine in Vajrayogini temples and celebrate the festival with their Hindu friends.

== Events ==
Traditional concerts are held in most cities in Nepal, including Kathmandu, Narayangarh, Pokhara, Itahari, Hetauda, and Dharan, and are broadcast on television with various celebrity guests.

People walk through their neighbourhoods to celebrate Holi by exchanging colours and spraying coloured water on one another. A popular activity is the throwing of water balloons at one another, sometimes called lola (meaning water balloon). Many people mix bhang (made from cannabis, milk and spices) in their drinks and food, as is also done during Shivaratri. It is believed that the combination of different colours at this festival takes sorrow away and makes life more colourful.

== Gallery ==
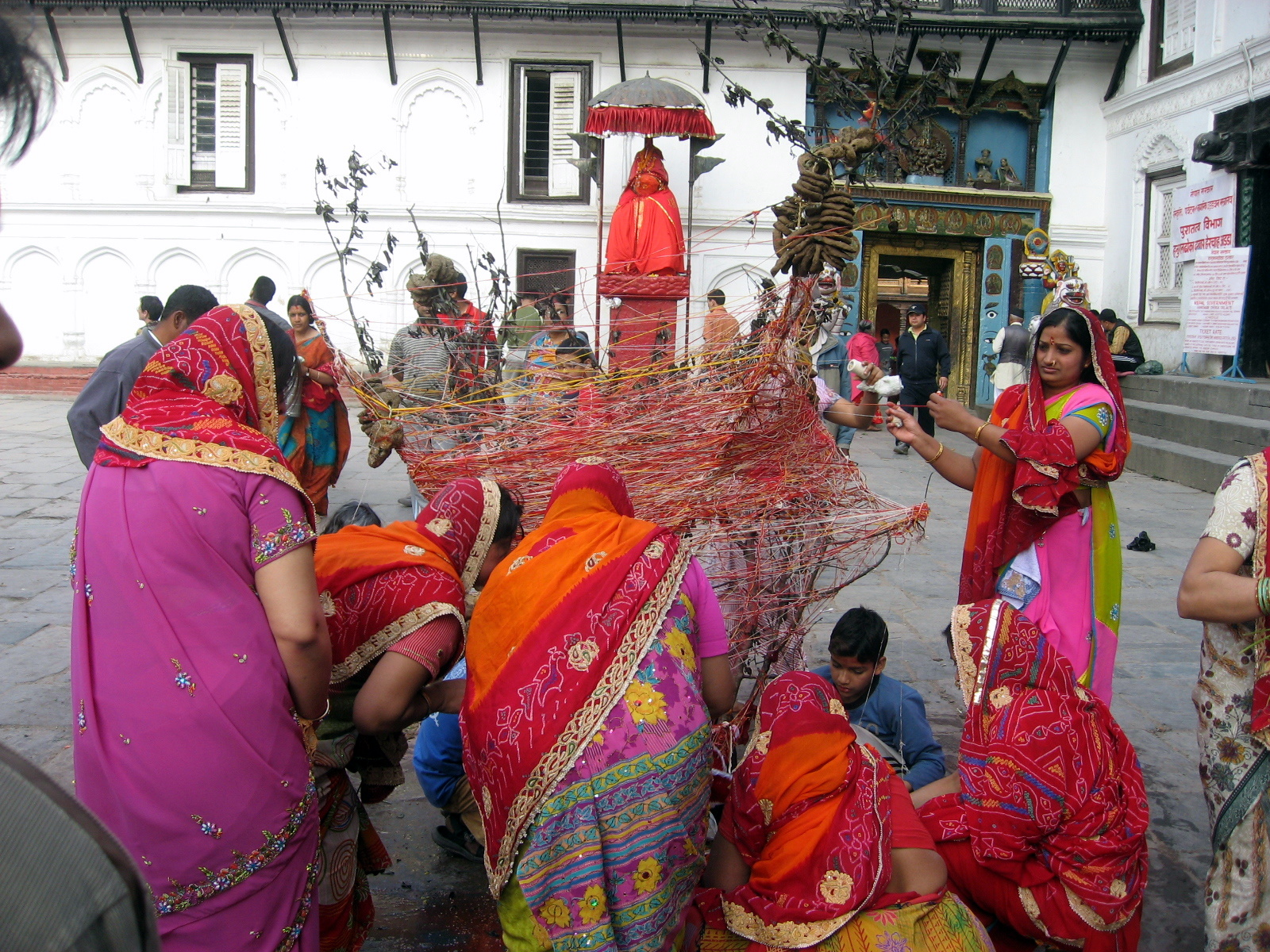
Preparing for Holika Dahan, Kathamandu, Nepal

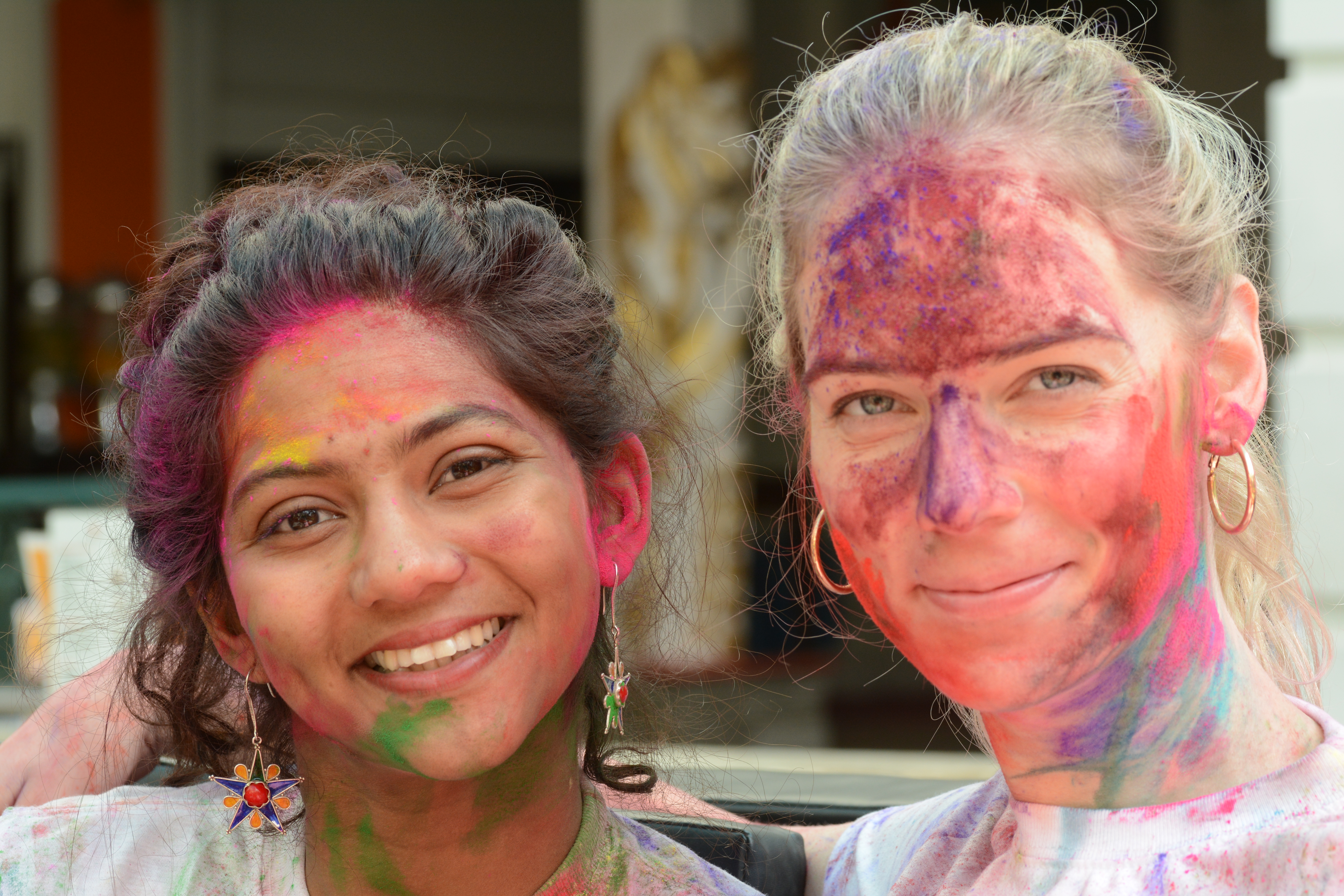
Women celebrating Holi in Kathmandu, Nepal

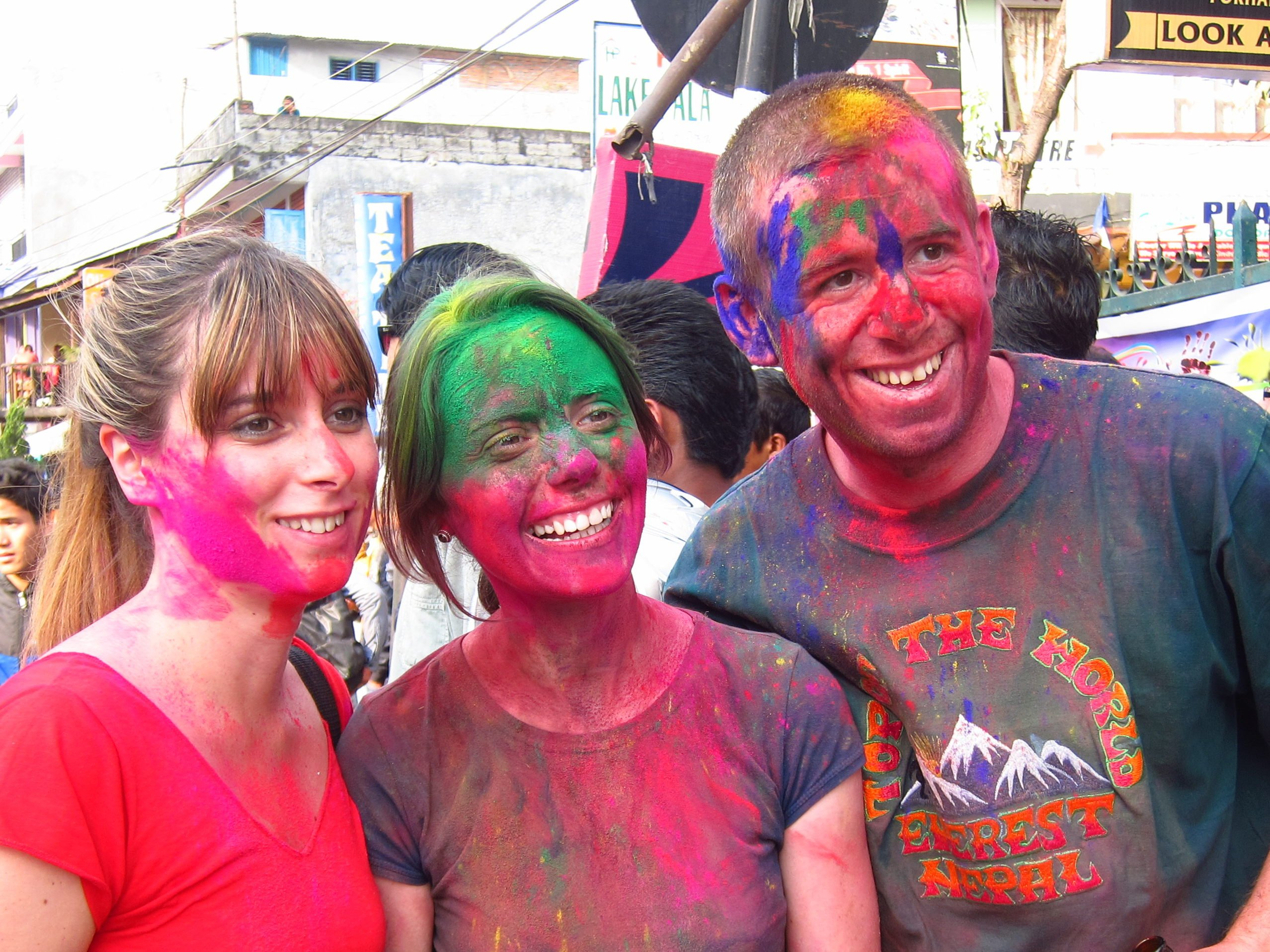
Tourists celebrating Holi in Pokhara, Nepal (2012)

== See also ==
- Diwali
- Lathmar Holi
- Songkran (Thailand) – Traditional Thai New Year's holiday, famous for ritualised public water fights
- Midsummer – Holiday held close to the summer solstice
- Nowruz – New Year's Day on the Iranian calendars
