= Kulung people =

The Kulung, also called Kulunge, are one of the major subgroup of kirati people and indigenous communities of Nepal, as well as parts of northeastern Sikkim and Darjeeling district of India, having their own Kulung language, culture, history and tradition.

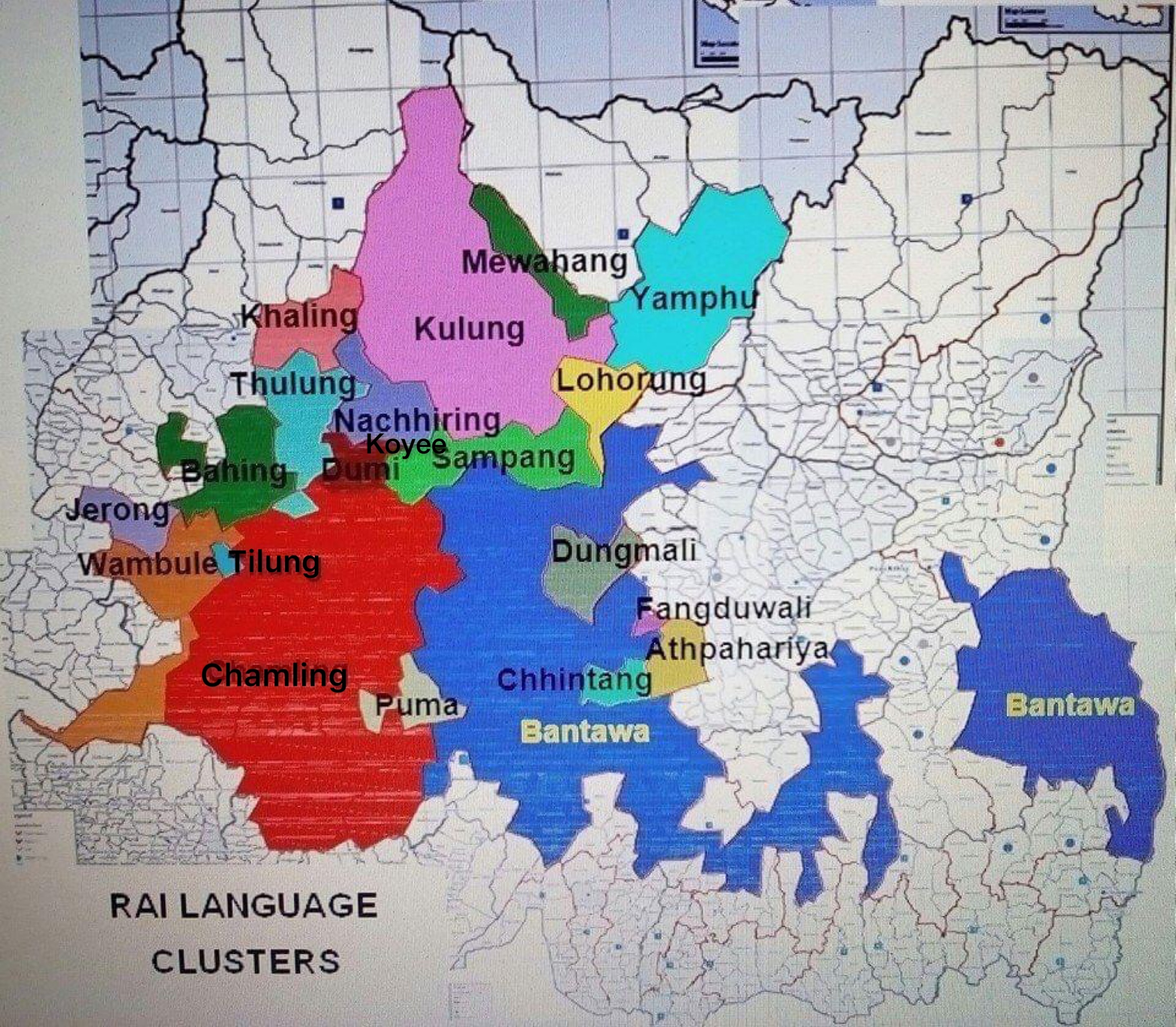
Traditional territory of Kulung linguistic Kirati-Subgroup areas of lower Solukhumbu District and few areas of Sankhuwasabha District in Eastern Nepal Koshi Province

The ethno-linguistic region inhabited by the Kulung is called the "Mahakulung" ("Greater Kulung") and is located in the Solukhumbu District of Koshi Province of Nepal. It specifically refers to the Hongu valley, comprising Gudel, Chheskam, Bung, Pawai and Sotang, as well as villages in the Sankhuwasawa District and the valleys of the Hongu, Sangkhuwa and Sisuwa rivers. Presently Mahakulung is located in the Bung, Chheskam, Gudel and Sotang village development committees in the Solukhumbu District in the eastern part of Nepal. There are Kulung communities in 22 districts of Nepal. However, the major settlements are Solukhumbu, Sankhuwasabha, Bhojpur, Khotang, Sunsari, Morang, Jhapa, Illam, Tehrathum, and Kathmandu.

They are part of Kirat community, tracing their lineage from the Kirati ruler Khambu. In the hunting era, four Kitanti ancestors, namely Khapdulu, Ratapkhu, Chhemsi and Tamsi, had entered Mahakulung through Rawakhola of Khotang. They liked those places and so Ratapkhu inhabited in Sotang, while Khapdulu, Tamsi and Chhemsi created Pelmang, Chheskam and Chhemsi villages, respectively. Recent generations of those four Kiranti ancestors are known as Kulung, and those large areas they have been occupying in Solukhumbu are called Mahakulung. With the beginning of modern era, they started to go out from their territory to search better life. In this regard, some migrated to Sikkim and Darjeeling of India and some to different parts of Nepal. In World War I and World War II, some Kulung youth were admitted into the British Army and then they migrated in more developed cities such as Dharan, Jhapa and Ilam of Nepal.

The Kulung practise exogamous clan marriage. As per their traditional laws, they are not allowed to marriage within 5 generations of their mother and 7 generations of their father, meaning their spouses must not have been relate to them within that number of generations.It also has a person named Paruhang Kulung For example, the descendants of two brothers cannot marry until after 7 generations of their father and 5 generations of their mother. In this situation they have to create the next sub clan from their main clan, which is called "Phomchim" in the Kulung language.

The Kulung community is one of the most marginalized ethnic groups in the country. As they reside in remote hilly areas, basic infrastructure and services, like drivable roads, electricity, clean drinking water, education, communication and health services are lacking.

The majority of the Kulung are dependent on traditional agriculture, cultivating millet and maize; they are also hunters and fishermen. Due to unproductive land conditions, they are not able to produce adequate food from their farms. They are compelled to migrate in search of better work for their livelihoods.

They practice traditional religion Kirati and Buddhism. Unlike most Hindus and Buddhists in Nepal, the Kulung bury their dead instead of cremating them.

== Geographical distribution ==
At the time of the 2011 Nepal census, 28,613 people (0.1% of the population of Nepal) were Kulung. The frequency of Kulung people by province was as follows:

- Koshi Province (0.6%)
- Bagmati Province (0.0%)
- Gandaki Province (0.0%)
- Karnali Province (0.0%)
- Lumbini Province (0.0%)
- Madhesh Province (0.0%)
- Sudurpashchim Province (0.0%)

The frequency of Kulung people was higher than national average (0.1%) in the following districts:

- Solukhumbu (8.9%)
- Sankhuwasabha (6.2%)
- Bhojpur (2.2%)
- Tehrathum (0.5%)
- Sunsari (0.4%)
