= Thulung Dudhkoshi Rural Municipality =

Thulung Dudhkoshi थुलुङ दुधकोशी गाउँपालिका
- Rural Municipality
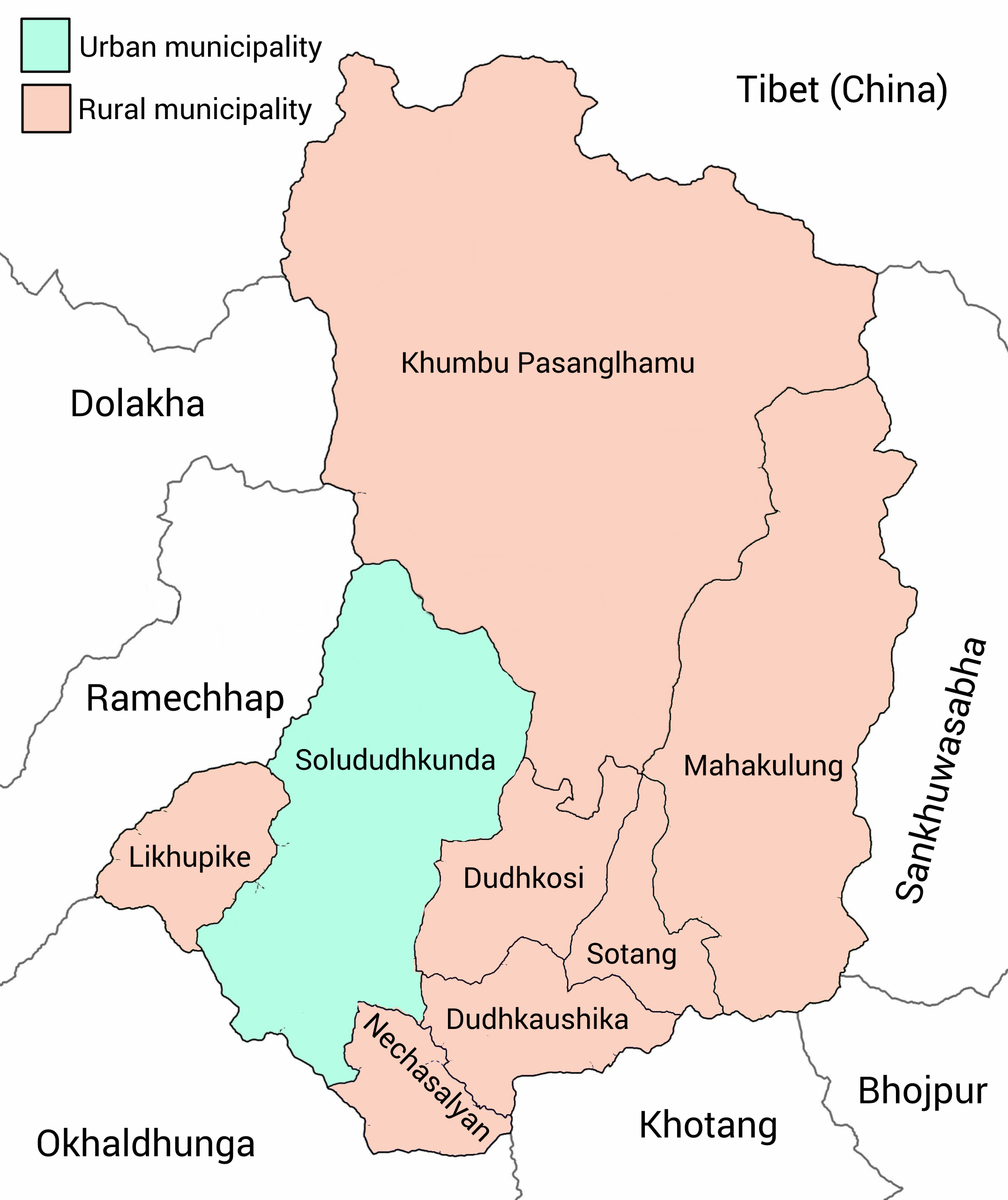

- Location within Koshi Province Location within Nepal
- Coordinates (Mukli): 27.44°N 86.68°E
- Country: Nepal
- Province: Province No. 1
- District: Solukhumbu
- Total wards: 9
- Established: 2017
- Headquarters: Mukli

Government
  - Type: Rural Council
  - Chairperson: Vacant
  - Vice-chairperson: Sabita Rai (NC)

Area
  - Area & Population: 144.6 km^{2} (55.8 sq mi)

Population (2011)
  - Area & Population: 19,672
  - Density: 136.0/km^{2} (352.4/sq mi)
- Time zone: UTC+5:45 (Nepal Standard Time)
- Website: thulungdudhkoshimun.gov.np

Thulung Dudhkoshi (Nepali: थुलुङ दुधकोशी गाउँपालिका) or Dudhkaushika is a rural municipality (gaunpalika) out of seven rural municipality located in Solukhumbu District of Province No. 1 of Nepal. There are a total of 8 municipalities in Solukhumbu in which 1 is urban and 7 are rural.

According to Ministry of Federal Affairs and Local Development Thulung Dudhkoshi has an area of 144.6 square kilometres (55.8 mi^{2}) and the total population of the municipality is 19672 as of Census of Nepal 2011.

Nele, Kangel, Panchan, Jubu, Mukali, and Deusar Lokhim which previously were all separate Village development committee merged to form this new local level body. Fulfilling the requirement of the new Constitution of Nepal 2015, Ministry of Federal Affairs and Local Development replaced all old VDCs and Municipalities into 753 new local level body (Municipality).

The rural municipality is divided into total 9 wards and the headquarter of this newly formed rural municipality is situated in Mukli.
