= Khaling language =

Kiranti language of India

Khaling
- khāliṅ
- खालिङ
- Native to: Nepal
- Region: Solukhumbu and Khotang districts
- Ethnicity: Khaling Rai
- Native speakers: 14,467 in Nepal (2011 census) unknown number in India
- Language family: Sino-Tibetan: Tibeto-Burman; Mahakiranti (?); Kiranti; Western; Upper Dudhkosi; Khaling
- Writing system: Devanagari

Language codes
- ISO 639-3: klr
- Glottolog: khal1275
- ELP: Khaling

Khaling (kʰɛ̂l brâː ख्या:ल् ब्रा:) is a Kiranti language spoken in Solukhumbu district, Nepal and Sikkim, Darjeeling, and Kalimpong in India. It is one of the few Kiranti languages with tonal contrasts, which are of secondary origin.

Khaling has approximately 15,000 speakers and is therefore considered a vulnerable language. Khaling is also known as Rai, Khalinge Rai, Khael Bra, and Khael Baat.

== General information ==
Khaling is still being acquired by children who live in Khaling-speaking areas, as well as non-Khaling children who happen to live in that area.

== Geographical distribution ==
Khaling is spoken in the following VDC's of Nepal (Ethnologue).

- Solukhumbu District, Province No. 1: Kanku, Basa, Waku, Buksa, Jubing, Pawai and Phuleli villages
- Khotang District, Province No. 1: Buipa Fuleli and Kharmi villages
- Udayapur District, Province No. 1: Triyuga Municipality Gaighat, Basaha, Belter, Rampur city.
- Sankhuwasabha District, Province No. 1: Tungkhaling village
- Sunsari District, Province No. 1: Dharan
- Ilam District, Province No. 1: Pang, Sumbek, and Mai Pokhari villages

== Phonology ==
=== Vowels ===
Vowel phonemes
	Front		Central				Back	
	unrounded		rounded		unrounded		rounded	
	short	long	short	long	short	long	short	long
High	i ⟨इ⟩	iː	ʉ ⟨अ्यु⟩	ʉː			u ⟨उ⟩	uː
High-mid	e ⟨ए⟩	eː	ɵ ⟨अ्यो⟩	ɵː			o ⟨ओ⟩	oː
Low-mid	ɛ ⟨अ्या⟩	ɛː			ʌ ⟨अ⟩		oɔ ⟨अ्वा⟩	
Low					ä ⟨आ⟩	äː		

- Khaling language has rising-falling is denoted by using / ः/ while using Devanagari script.
- /ʌ/ and /oɔ/ do not appear as long vowels.
- Long vowels are denoted by ⟨ऽ⟩.

=== Consonants ===
Khaling consonant phonemes
			Bilabial	Dental	alveolar	Velar	Glottal
Nasal			m ⟨म⟩		n ⟨न⟩	ŋ ⟨ङ⟩	
Affricate	voiceless	unaspirated	p ⟨प⟩	t̪ ⟨त⟩	ts ⟨च⟩	k ⟨क⟩	ʔ ⟨अ्⟩
Affricate	voiceless	aspirated	pʰ ⟨फ⟩	t̪ʰ ⟨थ⟩	tsʰ ⟨छ⟩	kʰ ⟨ख⟩	
Affricate	voiced	unaspirated	b ⟨ब⟩	d̪ ⟨द⟩	dz ⟨ज⟩	ɡ ⟨ग⟩	
Affricate	voiced	aspirated	bʱ ⟨भ⟩	d̪ʱ ⟨ध⟩	dzʱ ⟨झ⟩	ɡʱ ⟨घ⟩	
Fricative				s ⟨स⟩		h x ⟨ह⟩	
Trill				r ⟨र⟩			
Lateral				l ⟨ल⟩			
Frictionless continuant			w ⟨व⟩		j ⟨य⟩		

- Glotta stop [ʔ] is one of the consonants of Koyu/Koyee(Koi) language which is represent by using ⟨अ्⟩.
- To write Khaling language Devanagari lipi or Kirat Sirijungga lipi is used.

== Morphology ==
Khaling has a complex system of stem alternations: as many as 10 distinct stems have to be posited for a word. Khaling is very unusual in having an auditory demonstrative.

== See also ==
- Rai people
