= Mapya Dudhkoshi Rural Municipality =

Rural municipality in Koshi Province, Nepal

Mapya Dudhkoshi माप्य दुधकोशी गाउँपालिका
- Rural Municipality
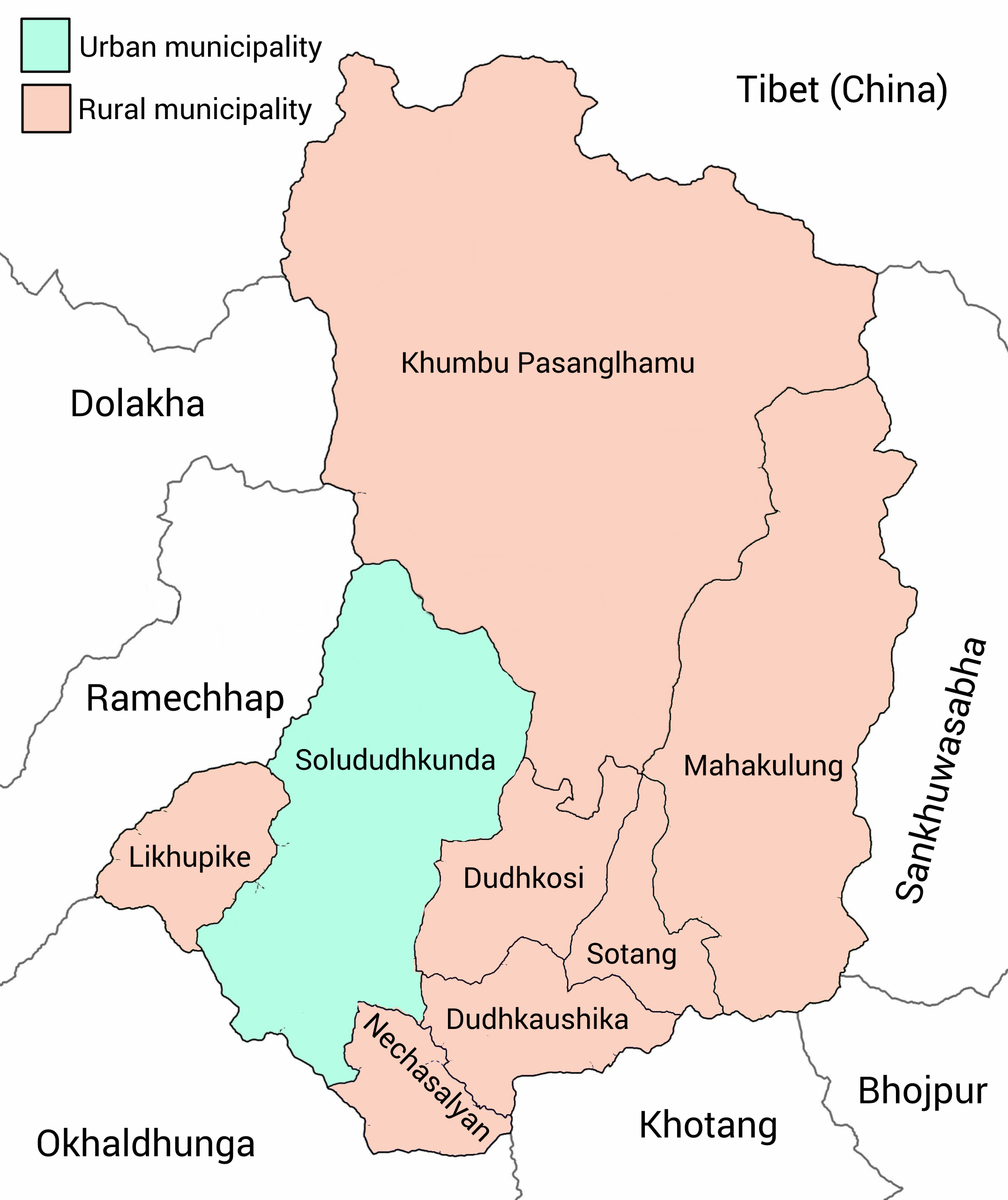

- Location in Koshi Province Mapya Dudhkoshi (Nepal)
- Coordinates: 27.54°N 86.68°E
- Province: Koshi Province
- District: Solukhumbu
- Wards: 7
- Established: 10 March 2017

Government
  - Type: Rural Council
  - Chairperson: Mr. Buddhi Kiran Rai (NCP)
  - Vice-chairperson: Mr. Gaurab Rai (Maoist Centre)

Area
  - Total: 167.67 km^{2} (64.74 sq mi)

Population (2011)
  - Total: 13,414
  - Density: 80.002/km^{2} (207.21/sq mi)
- Time zone: UTC+5:45 (Nepal Standard Time)
- Headquarter: Basa
- Website: official website

Mapya Dudhkoshi (Nepali: माप्य दुधकोशी गाउँपालिका) is a rural municipality (gaunpalika) out of seven rural municipality located in Solukhumbu District of Koshi Province of Nepal. There are a total of 8 municipalities in Solukhumbu in which 1 is urban and 7 are rural.

== Etymology ==
The name Mapya is traditionally believed to originate from the ancestor of the Khaling Rai ethnic group of that region. According to oral tradition, there were two brothers, Dikpya and Mapya. Mapya, the younger brother, is said to have settled in the present-day area of Mapya Dudhkoshi, where he began farming and established permanent residence. Over time, the area came to be associated with his name.

The term Dudhkoshi refers to the Dudh Koshi River, which flows through the region. The river originates from glaciers in the Mount Everest region and is one of the major tributaries of the Koshi River system.

== Geography ==
According to Ministry of Federal Affairs and Local Developme Mapya Dudhkoshi has an area of 167.67 square kilometres (64.74 mi^{2}) and the total population of the municipality is 13414 as of Census of Nepal 2011.

Part of Jubing, Basa, Kaku and Baku which previously were all separate Village development committee merged to form this new local level body. Fulfilling the requirement of the new Constitution of Nepal 2015, Ministry of Federal Affairs and Local Development replaced all old VDCs and Municipalities into 753 new local level body (Municipality).

The rural municipality is divided into total 7 wards and the headquarter of this newly formed rural municipality is situated in Basa.
