= Likhupike Rural Municipality =

Likhu Pike लिखु पिके गाउँपालिका
- Rural Municipality
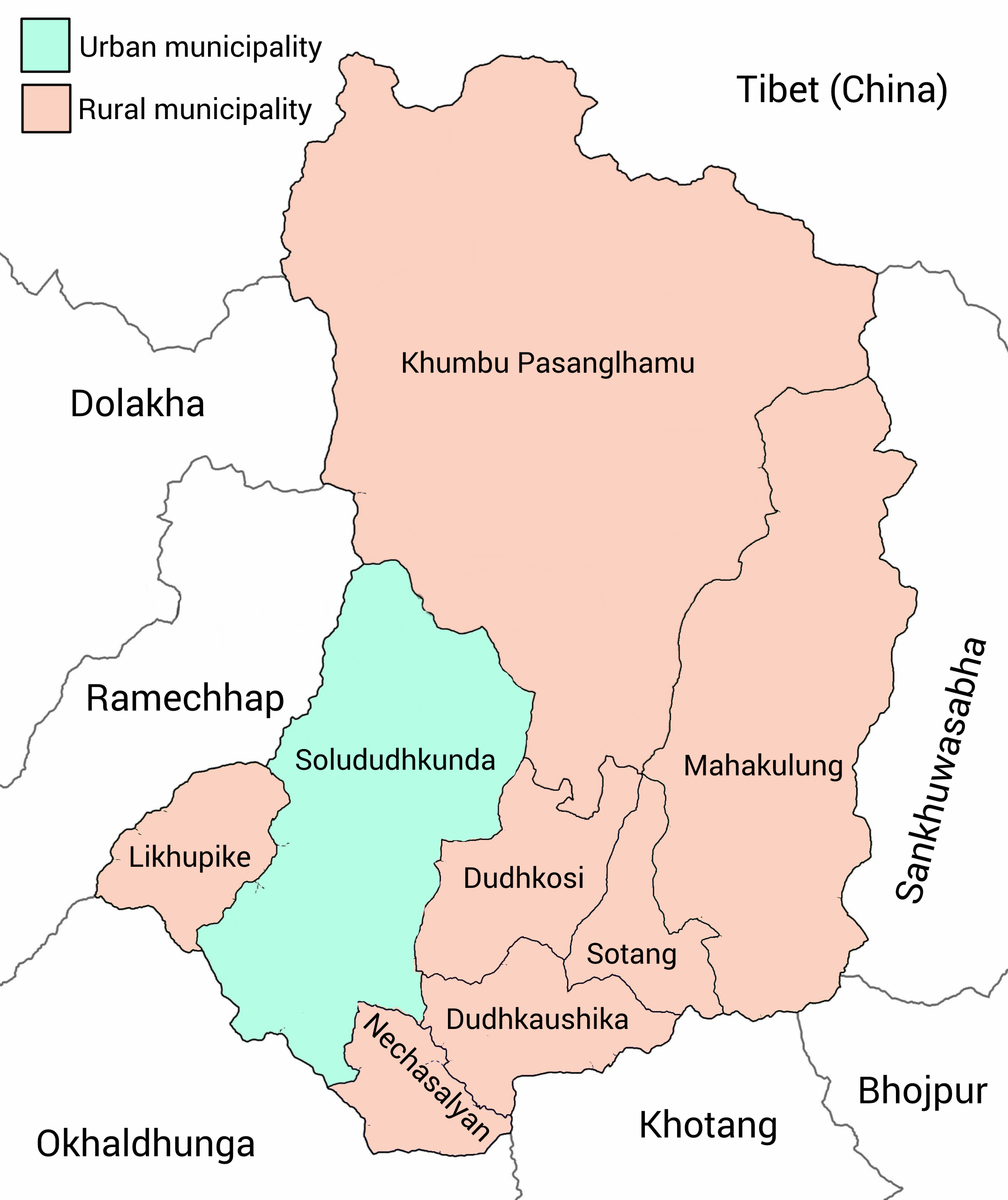

- Location in Province No. 1 Likhu Pike (Nepal)
- Coordinates: 27.56°N 86.39°E
- Province: Province No. 1
- District: Solukhumbu
- Wards: 5
- Established: 10 March 2017

Government
  - Type: Rural Council
  - Chairperson: Mr. Dammar B. Basnet (NCP)
  - Vice-chairperson: Mrs. Pramila Basnet Karki (NCP)

Area
  - Total: 124.38 km^{2} (48.02 sq mi)

Population (2011)
  - Total: 5,534
  - Density: 44.49/km^{2} (115.2/sq mi)
- Time zone: UTC+5:45 (Nepal Standard Time)
- Headquarter: Chaulakharka
- Website: official website

Likhu Pike (Nepali: लिखु पिके गाउँपालिका) is a rural municipality (gaunpalika) out of seven rural municipality located in Solukhumbu District of Province No. 1 of Nepal. There are a total of 8 municipalities in Solukhumbu in which 1 is urban and 7 are rural.

According to Ministry of Federal Affairs and Local Developme Mahakulung has an area of 124.38 square kilometres (48.02 mi^{2}) and the total population of the municipality is 5534 as of Census of Nepal 2011.

Goli, Chaulakharka and Bhakanje which previously were all separate Village development committee merged to form this new local level body. Fulfilling the requirement of the new Constitution of Nepal 2015, Ministry of Federal Affairs and Local Development replaced all old VDCs and Municipalities into 753 new local level body (Municipality).

The rural municipality is divided into total 5 wards and the headquarter of this newly formed rural municipality is situated in Chaulakharka.
