= Kulung language (Nepal) =

Kiranti language of Nepal

Kulung
- kulu riŋ
- Native to: Nepal and India (Sikkim, Darjeeling, Kalimpong)
- Native speakers: 33,000 (2011 census)
- Language family: Sino-Tibetan: Tibeto-Burman; Mahakiranti (?); Kiranti; Central; Khambu; Kulung
- Dialects: Chukwa

Language codes
- ISO 639-3: kle – inclusive code Individual code: cuw – Chukwa
- Glottolog: kulu1253 Kulung chuk1270 Chukwa
- ELP: Kulung (Nepal)
- Chukwa

Kulung (autonym: Kulu riŋ, [kulu rɪŋ]) is one of the Kiranti languages. It is spoken by an estimated 33,000 people. Van Driem (2001) includes Chukwa as a dialect.

== Locations ==
Kulung in some ten villages along the upper reaches of the Huṅga or Hoṅgu River (a tributary of the Dūdhkosī), in Solukhumbu District of Sagarmāthā Zone, Nepal. The main Kulung-speaking villages are Chhemsi and Chheskam. The particular dialect of the language spoken in these two villages is considered by the Kulung to be the most original form of their language. Downstream, on both sides of the Huṅga river, in villages that are now called Luchcham, Gudel, Chocholung, Nāmluṅg, Pilmo, Bung, Chhekmā, and Sātdi, less prestigious varieties of Kulung are spoken.

Ethnologue lists the following Kulung villages:

- Hongu River valley, Solukhumbu District, Sagarmatha Zone: Bung, Pelmang, Chhemsing, Chheskam, Lucham, Chachalung, Satdi, Gudel, Namlung, Sotang, and Chekma villages
- Sankhuwasabha district, Kosi Zone: Mangtewa, Yaphu, and Seduwa VDCs
- Bhojpur District, Kosi Zone: Phedi, Limkhim, Khartanga, and Wasepla VDCs

== Phonology ==
Dialects of the Kulung language include Sotang (Sotaring, Sottaring), Mahakulung, Tamachhang, Pidisoi, Chhapkoa, Pelmung, Namlung, and Khambu. Kulung distinguishes among eight vowels and 11 diphthongs. There are three series of stops: dorso-velar, dental, and labial, each series having an unaspirated voiceless, aspirated voiceless, and unaspirated voiced variant. There are three voiced nasals, four approximants, one vibrant, one fricative, and three affricates.

=== Vowels ===
Kulung has six short vowels and six long vowels:

Kulung vowels
	Front		Central		Back	
	short	long	short	long	short	long
Close	i	iː			u	uː
Mid	e	eː	ə	əː	ɔ	ɔː
Open			a	aː		

- Front and central vowels are unrounded, whereas back vowels are rounded.

=== Consonants ===
Consonant phonemes
		Bilabial	Dental	Palatal	Velar	Glottal
Nasals		m	n		ŋ	
Plosives; and; Affricates	voiceless unaspirated	p	t	tɕ	k	ʔ
Plosives; and; Affricates	voiced	b	d	dʑ	g	ʔ
Plosives; and; Affricates	voiceless aspirated	pʰ	tʰ	tɕʰ	kʰ	
Fricatives	voiceless		s			
Fricatives	voiced					ɦ
Flaps			ɾ			
Approximants		w	l	j		

Example words for consonant phonemes
IPA	Example		
/k/	/koŋ/	[kɔŋ]	'I'
/kʰ/	/kʰoŋ/	[kʰɔŋ]	'brass bowl'
/g/	/goŋ/	[gɔŋ]	'division of a clan'
/p/	/mampai/	[mampai]	'It didn't leak.'
/pʰ/	/mampʰai/	[mampʰai]	'He didn't reverse it.'
/b/	/mambai/	[mambai]	'He didn't come.'
/t/	/tite/	[tite]	'It burns.'
/tʰ/	/tʰite/	[tʰite]	'He is awake.'
/d/	/dite/	[dite]	'It lays an egg.'
/tɕ/	/tɕi/	[tɕi]	'poison'
/tɕʰ/	/tɕʰi/	[tɕʰi]	'marrow'
/dʑ/	/dʑi/	[dʑi]	'happiness'
/s/	/si/	[si]	'louse'
/m/	/ma/	[ma]	'mother'
/n/	/na/	[na]	'elder sister'
/ŋ/	/ŋa/	[ŋa]	'fish'
/ɾ/	/ɾiŋ/	[ɾiŋ]	'language, word'
/l/	/liŋ/	[liŋ]	'yeast'
/j/	/ja/	[ja]	'edge of a blade'
/w/	/wa/	[wa]	'rain'
/ɦ/	/ɦu/	[ɦu]	'arm'
/ʔ/	/ʔa/	[ʔa]	'(ergative case marker)'

== Nominal morphology ==
To the nominal categories belong the following parts of speech: nouns, adjectives, pronouns and numerals. There are unambiguous morphological criteria for distinguishing between nouns and verbs. Whereas nouns can be marked for case and number, finite verbs are marked for person, number, and tense. There is no grammatical gender in Kulung.

=== Personal pronouns ===
The ten Kulung personal pronouns have three number distinctions (singular, dual, and plural) and three person distinctions (first person, second person and third person) as well as an inclusive/exclusive distinction. There are no gender distinctions.

Kulung personal pronouns
	Singular	Dual	Plural
1st exclusive	koŋ 'I'	kaska 'we (he/she and I)'	keika 'we (all of them, and I)'
1st inclusive	-	kas 'we (you and I)'	kei 'we (all of you, and I)'
2nd	an 'you'	anci 'you (two)'	anni 'you (guys)'
3rd	ŋkə 'he/she'	-	ŋkəs 'they'

=== Cases ===
Kulung has thirteen cases. Case endings are attached to nouns with or without the non-singular suffix. Allomorphy of case endings depends on whether the noun ends in a vowel or consonant. Below the case endings of the noun lam 'road' are presented.

Kulung cases
Case	Suffix	English prep.	Example	Translation
absolutive	-	-	lam	road
genitive	-mi	of / 's	lam-mi	of (a) road/ road's
ergative	-ʔa	-	lam-ʔa	road
instrumental	-ʔa	by	lam-ʔa	by the road
vocative	-ʔa	-	lam-ʔa	o road
locative 1	-pi	at, on, in	lam-pi	on the road
locative 2	-to	at, on, in	lam-to	on the road (at a higher level)
locative 3	-pu	at, on, in	lam-pu	on the road (at a lower level)
locative 4	-pa	at, on, in	lam-pa	on the road (at same level)
comitative	-lo	with	lam-lo	with the road
ablative	-ka	from	lam-ka	from the road
elative	-pika	from out of	lam-pika	from out of the road
mediative	-la	via, by way of	lam-la	by the road

== Verbal morphology ==
The Kulung verb is characterised by a system of complex pronominalisation, in which paradigmatic stem alternation is found. Personal endings consist of morphemes expressing notions like tense, agent, patient, number, and exclusivity. Depending on the number of verbal stems and their position in the verbal paradigm, every verb in Kulung belongs to a certain conjugation type. Complete conjugations of verbs belonging to the different conjugation types are presented in the second appendix. Like in other Kiranti languages, compound verbs are found in Kulung. These compound verbs consist of a verb stem and an auxiliary that adds semantic notions to the main verb. Other verbal constructions found in Kulung are a gerund, imperative, supine and an infinitive.

The intransitive verb per-ma 'to fly'
	Non-preterite	Preterite	Negated preterite
1s	per-o:	pero	mam-per-ŋa
1di	per-ci	per-a-ci	mam-per-ci
1de	per-ci-ka	per-a-ci-ka	mam-per-s-ka
1pi	per-ya	per-i	mam-per-i
1pe	per-ya-ka	per-i-ka	mam-per-i-ka
2s	per-e	per-a	mam-per-na
2d	per-ci	per-a-ci	mam-per-nci
2p	per-ni	per-a-ni	mam-per-ni
3	per-e	per-a	mam-per

== Bibliography ==
Tolsma, Gerard Jacobus (2006). A Grammar of Kulung. Languages of the Greater Himalayan Region. Vol. 5/4. Leiden, Boston. ISBN 9789004153301.
