= Khumbu (disambiguation) =

Khumbu is a region in northeastern Nepal close to Mount Everest.

Khumbu may also refer to:

- Khumbu district
- Khumbu Icefall
- Khumbu Glacier
- Khumbu Pasanglhamu, a rural municipality in Solukhumbu District, Nepal
- Khumbu people
