= Bafa =

Bafa may refer to:

- Bapha, a village development committee in Solukhumbu District in the Sagarmatha Zone of north-eastern Nepal
- Bafa (food), a traditional dish of the Capeverdean cuisine

== Abbreviations ==
- Bangladesh Air Force Academy
- British Accounting & Finance Association
- British American Football Association also known as BAFA
- British Arts Festivals Association
- Bundesamt für Wirtschaft und Ausfuhrkontrolle, short BAFA, or Federal Office of Economics and Export Control

== Others ==
- BaFa' BaFa', a face-to-face learning simulation game
