= Mahakulung Rural Municipality =

Mahakulung महाकुलुङ गाउँपालिका
- Rural Municipality
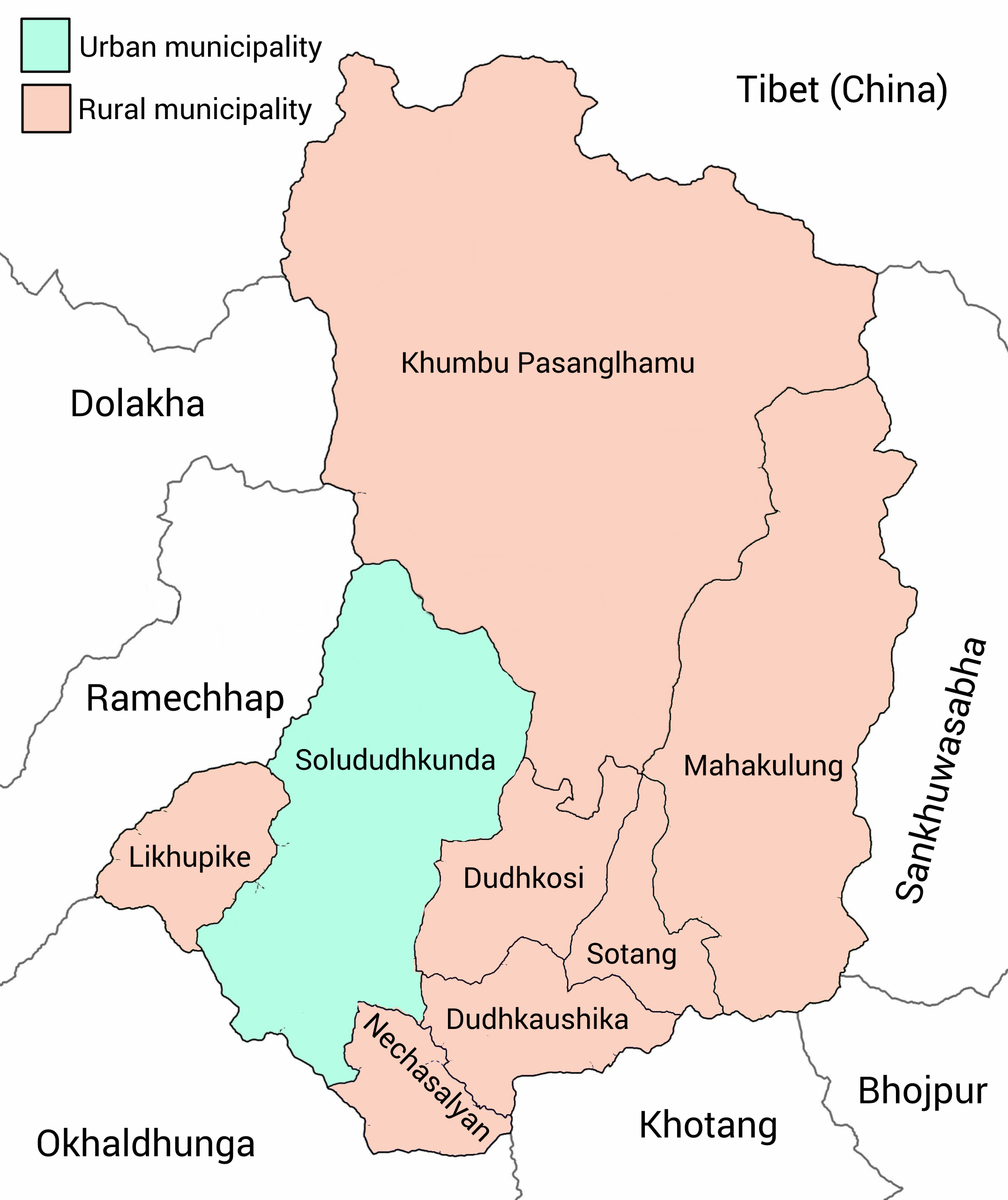

- Location in Province No. 1 Mahakulung (Nepal)
- Coordinates: 27.62°N 86.84°E
- Province: Province No. 1
- District: Solukhumbu
- Wards: 5
- Established: 10 March 2017

Government
  - Type: Rural Council
  - Chairperson: Mr.Surya Bahadur Rai (Nepali Congress)
  - Vice-chairperson: Mrs. Bipana Kulung (NC)

Area
  - Total: 648.05 km^{2} (250.21 sq mi)

Population (2011)
  - Total: 11,452
  - Density: 17.671/km^{2} (45.769/sq mi)
- Time zone: UTC+5:45 (Nepal Standard Time)
- Headquarter: Bung
- Website: official website

Mahakulung (Nepali: महाकुलुङ गाउँपालिका) is a rural municipality (gaunpalika) out of seven rural municipalities located in Solukhumbu District of Province No. 1 of Nepal. There are a total of 8 municipalities in Solukhumbu in which 1 is urban and 7 are rural.

According to Ministry of Federal Affairs and Local Developme Mahakulung has an area of 648.05 square kilometres (250.21 mi^{2}) and the total population of the municipality is 11848 as of Census of Nepa 2021 https://censusnepal.cbs.gov.np/results/np/population?province=1&district=3&municipality=2

Bung, Chheskam and Gudel which previously were all separate Village development committee merged to form this new local level body. Fulfilling the requirement of the new Constitution of Nepal 2015, Ministry of Federal Affairs and Local Development replaced all old VDCs and Municipalities into 753 new local level body (Municipality).

The rural municipality is divided into total 5 wards and the headquarter of this newly formed rural municipality is situated in Bung.
