= Star power =

Star power may refer to:

- StarPower (game), an educational game
- "Starpower", a 1986 single by alternative rock band Sonic Youth
- Star Power, a 2008 mixtape by rapper Wiz Khalifa
- ...And Star Power, a 2014 album by experimental rock duo Foxygen
- Star Power, a gameplay element in the video game Guitar Hero
- Star Power (TV series), a Filipino reality talent show
- At Your Service-Star Power, a Filipino public service program
- Alternative term for bankable star, an entertainer who is considered to be bankable
- Star (Mario), temporary invincibility in games in the Mario universe, sometimes called star power

== See also ==
- Power star (disambiguation)
