= Chukwa =

Chukwa may refer to

- the Chukwa language of Tibet
- an alleged World Turtle in Hindu mythology, see World-Tortoise (Hindu)
- a Hadoop subproject devoted to large-scale log collection and analysis. Chukwa is built on top of HDFS and MapReduce framework and inherits Hadoop's scalability and robustness.
