= Sotang Rural Municipality =

Sotang Rural Municipality सोताङ गाउँपालिका
- Rural Municipality
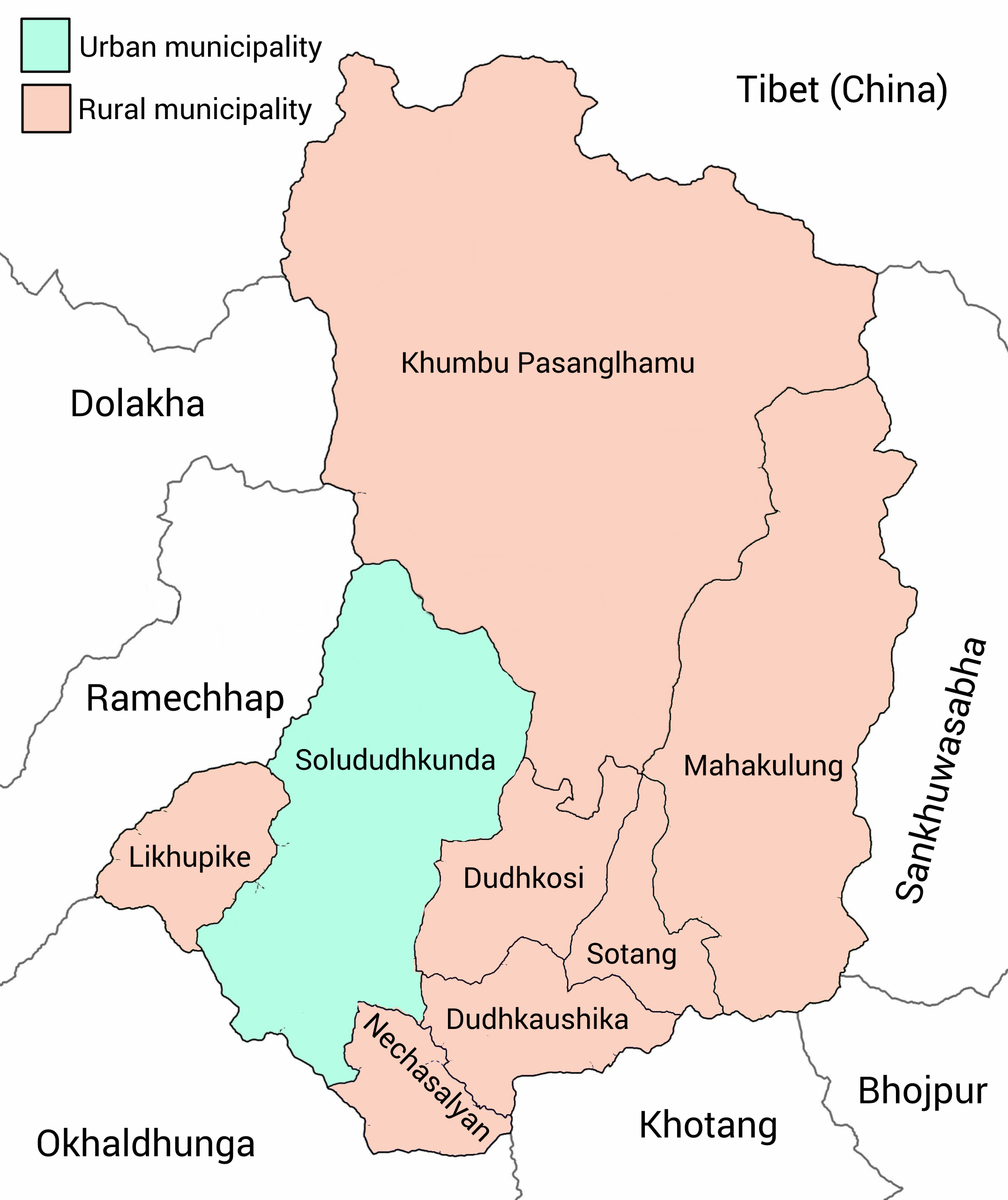

- Location of the Municipality Sotang Rural Municipality (Nepal)
- Coordinates: 27.4694°N 86.7903°E
- Country: Nepal
- Province: Koshi Province
- District: Solukhumbu District
- Established: 10 March 2017

Government
  - Type: Local government
  - Body: Local executive
  - Chairperson: Khilraj Basnet (NC)
  - Vice-chairperson: Mrs. Anju Nachhiring Rai (NC)

Area
  - Total: 103 km^{2} (40 sq mi)

Population (2011 Nepal census)
  - Total: 9,530
  - Density: 92.5/km^{2} (240/sq mi)
- Time zone: UTC+5:45 (Nepal Time)
- Website: official website

Sotang (Nepali: सोताङ) is one of the 7 rural municipalities of Solukhumbu District of Province No. 1 of Nepal. It was established on 10 March 2017 merging former VDCs Sotang, Pawai and Gudel (only 2 wards of Gudel).

Total area of Sotang is 103 square kilometres (40 mi^{2}) and the population is 9,530, according to the 2011 census of Nepal. Sotang is divided into 5 wards.

Sotang is surrounded by Mahakulung rural municipality in the east, Thulung Dudhkoshi rural municipality in the north-west and Mapya DudhDudhkoshi rural municipality in the south-west. It also shares part of its southern border with Khotang District.
