= Jubu =

Jubu may refer to:

- Jewish Buddhist
- Jubu, Nepal
