= Panchan =

Panchan may refer to:

- Panchan Rina, Japanese kickboxer
- Panchan, Nepal, village
- Panchen Lama, Tibetan title
- Banchan, Korean cuisine
