= Namche Bazaar =

Namche Bazaar ནམ་ཆེ་ཁྲོམ་ར नाम्चे बजार
- Neighborhood
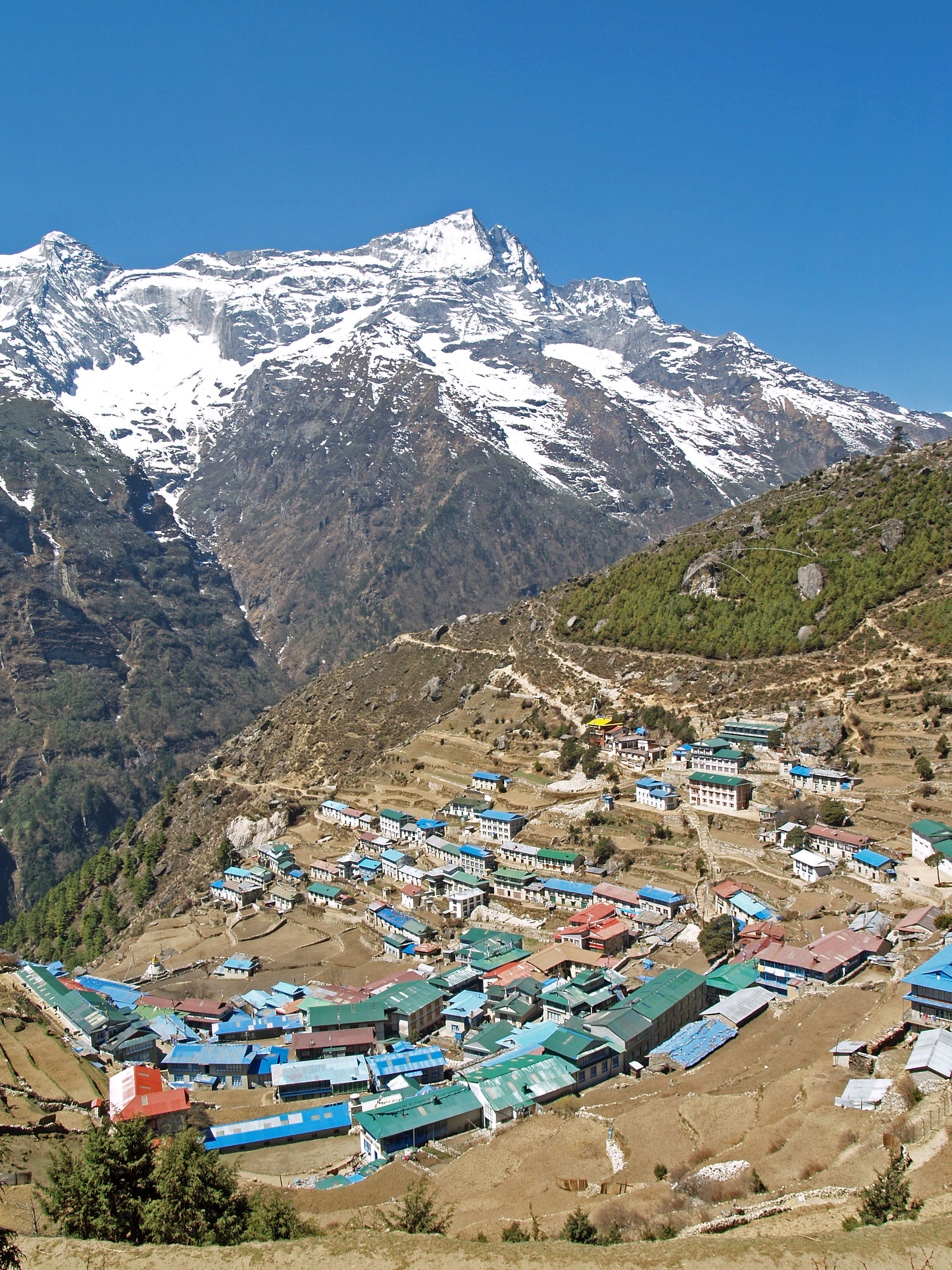
- Namche Bazaar with Kongde Ri peak in the background.
- Nickname: The Sherpa capital
- Location in Province No. 1 Namche Bazaar (Nepal)
- Coordinates: 27°49′N 86°43′E
- Country: Nepal
- Province: Koshi Province
- District: Solukhumbu District
- Rural Municipality: Khumbu Pasanglhamu
- Elevation: 3,440 m (11,290 ft)

Population (2001)
  - Total: 1,647
- Time zone: UTC+5:45 (NST)
- Postal code: 56002
- Area code: 038

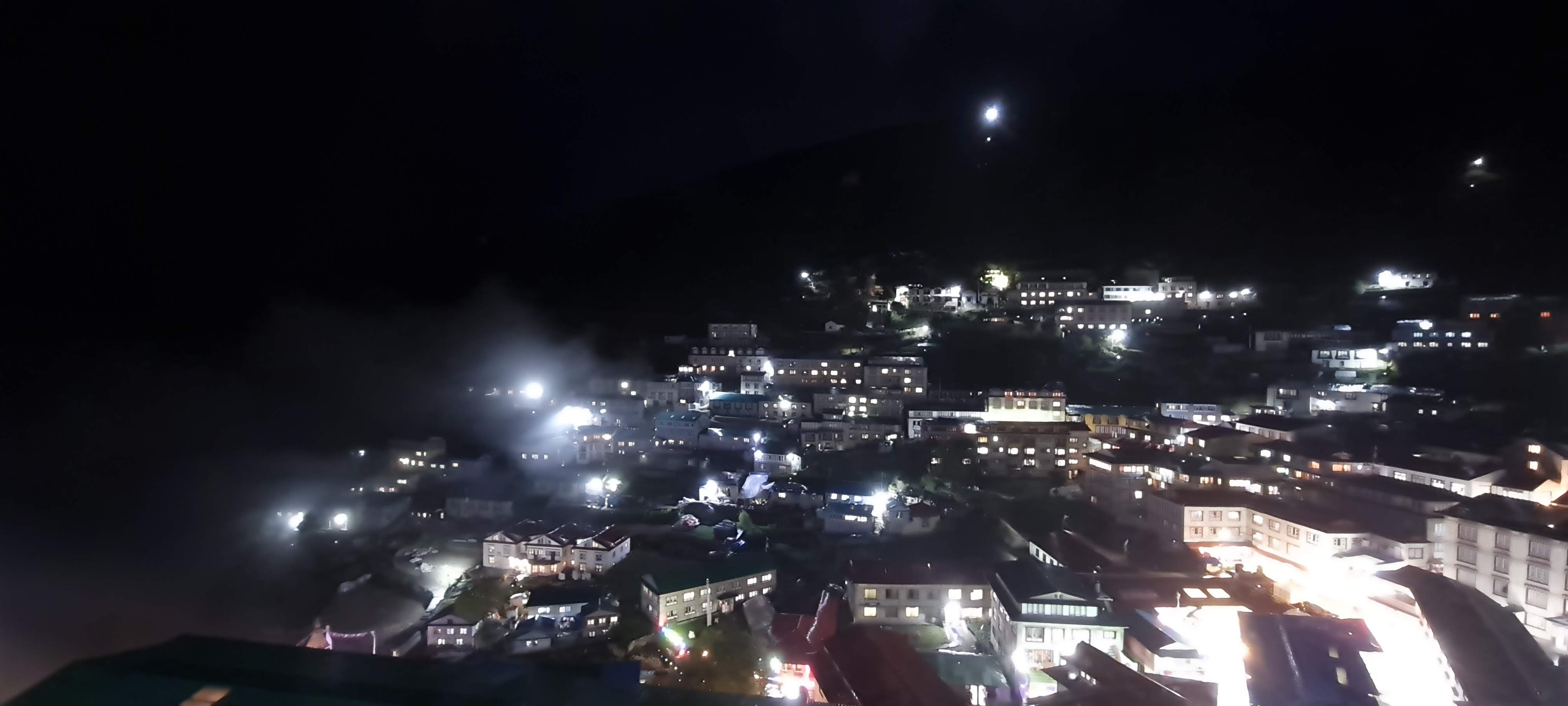
Namche Bazaar at Night

Namche Bazaar (also Namche Bazar, Nemche Bazaar or Namche Baza; Sherpa: ནམ་ཆེ་ཁྲོམ་ར, Nepali: नाम्चे बजार) is a town (formally Namche Village Development Committee) in Ward 5 of Khumbu Pasanglhamu Rural Municipality in Solukhumbu District of Koshi Province in northeastern Nepal. It is located within the Khumbu area at 3,440 metres (11,286 ft) at its low point, populating the sides of a hill. Most Sherpa in the tourism business hail from the Namche area. Namche is also the main trading center and hub for the Lanjey region.

Per the 2001 census, it had a population of 1,647 people living in 397 individual households.

== Geography ==
Namche Bazaar is situated 137 km (85 miles) northeast of Kathmandu, 366 km (227 miles) north of the provincial capital Biratnagar, and 13 km north of the nearest Tenzing–Hillary Airport in Lukla.

Immediately west of Namche is the Kongde Ri peak at 6,187 metres (20,299 ft) and to its east is the Thamserku peak at 6,623 metres (21,729 ft).

== Transport ==
On a hill overlooking Namche Bazaar is Syangboche Airport (3,750 m / 12,303 ft). It is no longer used for passenger flights, though helicopter flight is the option to reach directly to Namche Bazar. The helipad is located to the right north part of Bazar on the way to Dole. Airbus helicopter, Bell and MI17 helicopter operate flight to Namche.

The nearest open airport is Tenzing–Hillary Airport, located 13 km south of the town.

== Tourism ==
Namche Bazaar is popular with trekkers in the Khumbu region, especially for altitude acclimatization, and is the gateway to the high Himalaya. The town has a number of lodgings, stores and internet cafés catering to the needs of visitors. There are German bakeries, little cafés and many restaurants. There is also an Irish pub, said to be the highest and most remote Irish pub in the world. A popular local meal is yak steak.

On Saturday mornings, a weekly market is held in the centre of the town. There may also be a daily Tibet market where clothing and cheap Chinese consumer goods tend to be the main articles for sale.

Namche receives electricity from the nearby Thame-Namche hydropower plant (600 kW), opened in October 1995 near Thame.

== Climate ==
Namche has either a relatively cold dry-winter subtropical highland climate (Köppen climate classification Cwb) or an unusually mild dry-winter warm-summer humid continental climate (Köppen climate classification Dwb), depending on if you use the 0 °C (32 °F) isotherm or the −3 °C (26.6 °F) isotherm. The town features pleasant, wet summers and chilly, dry winters mainly affected by its altitude and the summer monsoon season. The average precipitation is 1,110 millimetres or 44 inches, and the average temperature is 6.1 °C or 43.0 °F.

Climate data for Namche Bazaar, elevation 3,450 m (11,320 ft)
Month	Jan	Feb	Mar	Apr	May	Jun	Jul	Aug	Sep	Oct	Nov	Dec	Year
Mean daily maximum °C (°F)	6.9 (44.4)	6.4 (43.5)	9.6 (49.3)	12.8 (55.0)	14.3 (57.7)	15.6 (60.1)	15.8 (60.4)	16.2 (61.2)	14.6 (58.3)	12.5 (54.5)	9.1 (48.4)	7.6 (45.7)	11.8 (53.2)
Daily mean °C (°F)	−0.9 (30.4)	0.0 (32.0)	3.2 (37.8)	6.8 (44.2)	9.0 (48.2)	10.6 (51.1)	11.8 (53.2)	11.8 (53.2)	10.3 (50.5)	6.9 (44.4)	2.7 (36.9)	0.3 (32.5)	6.0 (42.9)
Mean daily minimum °C (°F)	−8.5 (16.7)	−6.5 (20.3)	−3.0 (26.6)	0.8 (33.4)	3.7 (38.7)	5.9 (42.6)	7.8 (46.0)	7.5 (45.5)	5.9 (42.6)	1.2 (34.2)	−3.8 (25.2)	−7.1 (19.2)	0.3 (32.6)
Average precipitation mm (inches)	43 (1.7)	20 (0.8)	31 (1.2)	26 (1.0)	39 (1.5)	129 (5.1)	226 (8.9)	206 (8.1)	140 (5.5)	57 (2.2)	11 (0.4)	24 (0.9)	952 (37.3)
Source: FAO

== Pop culture references ==
"Namche Bazaar" is the name of a song by Nathan Rogers on his album The Gauntlet. The song was inspired by the mixing of culture along the silk road.
