= Deusa =

Former village development committee in Nepal

Deusa देउसा
- Village development committee
- Location in Nepal
- Coordinates: 27.46°N 86.70°E
- Country: Nepal
- Zone: Sagarmatha Zone
- District: Solukhumbu District

Population (1991)
  - Total: 3,835
- Time zone: UTC+5:45 (Nepal Time)

Deusa is a village development committee in Solukhumbu District in the Sagarmatha Zone of north-eastern Nepal. At the time of the 1991 Nepal census it had a population of 3835 people living in 747 individual households.
