= Mukli =

Coordinates: 27°26′N 86°40′E

- Interactive map of Mukli

Mukli is located in the Solukhambu District of Eastern Region of Nepal. Eastern Region's capital Dhankuta (Dhankutā) is approximately 83 km / 51 mi away from Mukli (as the crow flies). The distance from Mukli to Nepal's capital Kathmandu is approximately 136 km / 84 mi (as the crow flies).
