= Tingla =

Tingla तिङला
- Village development committee
- Location in Nepal
- Coordinates: 27.42°N 86.59°E
- Country: Nepal
- Zone: Sagarmatha Zone
- District: Solukhumbu District

Population (1991)
  - Total: 3,738
- Time zone: UTC+5:45 (Nepal Time)

Tingla is a village development committee in Solukhumbu District in the Sagarmatha Zone of north-eastern Nepal. At the time of the 1991 Nepal census it had a population of 3,738 people living in 710 individual households.

== Climate ==
Climate data for Tingla (Pakarnas), elevation 1,982 m (6,503 ft)
Month	Jan	Feb	Mar	Apr	May	Jun	Jul	Aug	Sep	Oct	Nov	Dec	Year
Mean daily maximum °C (°F)	13.2 (55.8)	14.8 (58.6)	19.0 (66.2)	22.5 (72.5)	23.3 (73.9)	23.4 (74.1)	22.7 (72.9)	22.8 (73.0)	21.9 (71.4)	21.0 (69.8)	17.8 (64.0)	14.6 (58.3)	19.8 (67.5)
Mean daily minimum °C (°F)	1.1 (34.0)	2.4 (36.3)	6.0 (42.8)	9.6 (49.3)	12.2 (54.0)	14.9 (58.8)	15.5 (59.9)	15.0 (59.0)	14.0 (57.2)	10.7 (51.3)	5.3 (41.5)	2.0 (35.6)	9.1 (48.3)
Average precipitation mm (inches)	15.8 (0.62)	16.2 (0.64)	32.2 (1.27)	45.7 (1.80)	92.2 (3.63)	263.6 (10.38)	493.2 (19.42)	484.4 (19.07)	253.4 (9.98)	70.4 (2.77)	9.6 (0.38)	8.3 (0.33)	1,785 (70.29)
Source 1: Australian National University
Source 2: Japan International Cooperation Agency (precipitation)
