= Kerung VDC =

Former Village Development Committee in Nepal

Kerung केरुङ
- Village development committee
- Location in Nepal
- Country: Nepal
- Zone: Sagarmatha Zone
- District: Solukhumbu District

Population (2011)
  - Total: 3,602
- Time zone: UTC+5:45 (Nepal Standard Time)

Kerung is a village development committee in Solukhumbu District in the Sagarmatha Zone of north-eastern Nepal. At the time of the 2011 Nepal census, it had a population of 3,602 people living in 873 individual households.
