= Lokhim =

Former Village Development Committee in Nepal

Lokhim लोखिम
- Village development committee
- Lokhim
- Motto: समृद्द लोखिम हाम्रो अभियान
- Location in Nepal
- Coordinates: 27.44°N 86.77°E
- Country: Nepal
- Zone: Sagarmatha Zone
- District: Solukhumbu District, Thulung Dudhkoshi RM

Government
  - Type: Chairperson
  - Chairperson: San Kumar Tamang

Population (2020)
  - Total: 3,500+
- Time zone: UTC+5:45 (Nepal Time)
- Area code: 038

Lokhim is a village located in Thulung Dudhkoshi Rural Municipality, Ward No. 9. It is one of the most attractive and culturally rich villages in eastern Nepal. The chairperson of the village is San Kumar Tamang. The village is surrounded with lush greens, flora and fauna. Lokhim is located at approximately 400km south-east of the capital Kathmandu.

There are majorly four casts are living in Lokhim which includes Rai, Tamang, Sherpa, Biswakarma and few Damai. Each of these community have their own languages, rituals, traditions and culture. Sakela (also known as Toshi) is one of the celebrated festivals in Lokhim where Rai people come together and dance. Sakela (Toshi) is not only or community bonding but it also has its own historical and cultural importance. Tamang has celebrate theirs great festival as "Lhochhar". It means 'Lho' refers 'Year' and 'Chhar' refers 'New', together it is 'New Year'. This festival used to celebrate as their changed of Year (Lho). Sherpa celebrates "Losar" festival as a new year. Biswakarma and Damai are communities in Lokhim.

== History ==
Lokhim village got its name from the local Rai people. Lo = "Frog" and Khim = "House" which means there house of frogs. In the old days, there were many frogs in this village. So, the local Rai people named the village with frog's story. Lokhim is one of the backwarded villages in the Solukhumbu district. It is located in eastern part of the headquarter Salleri.

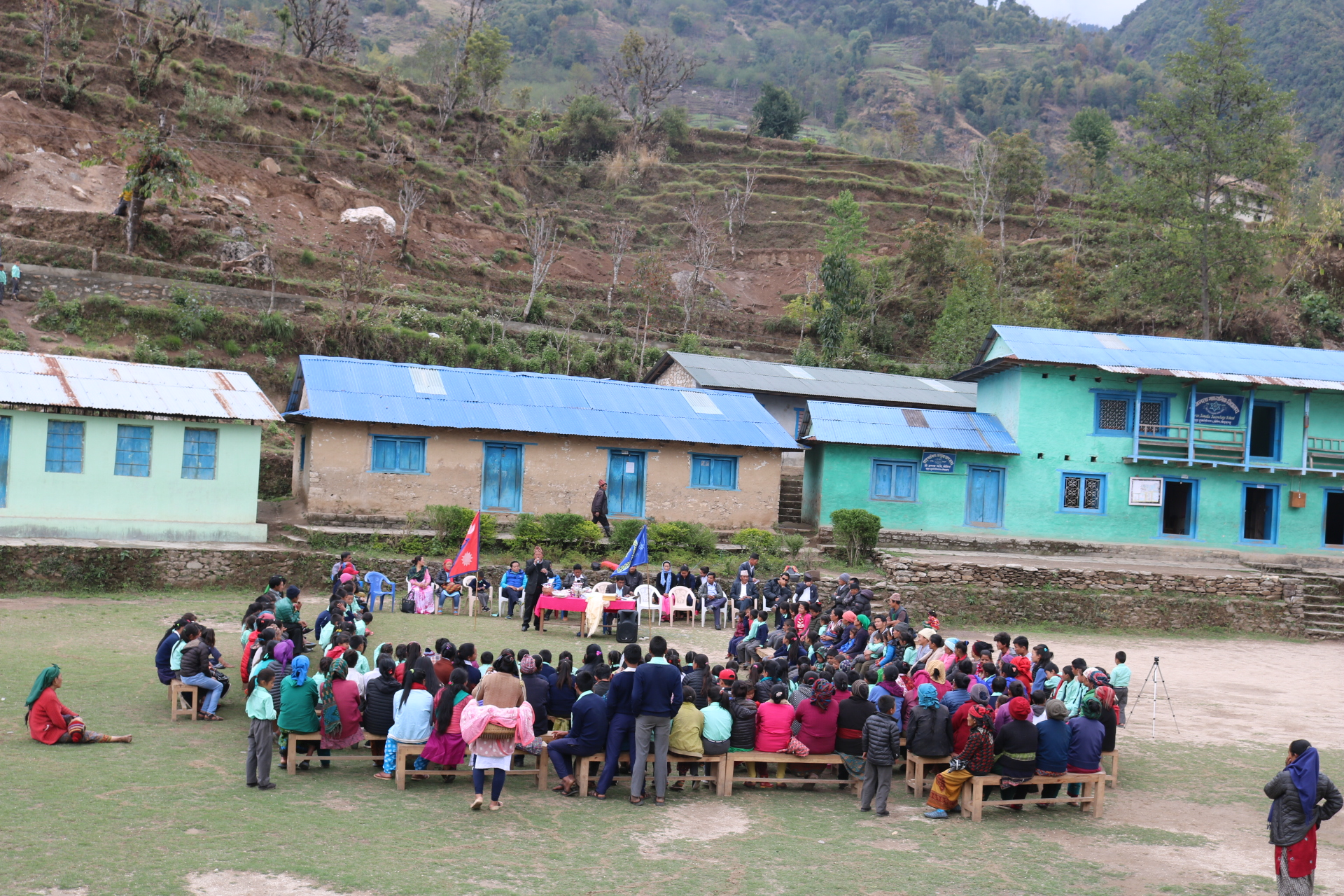
Shree Janata Secondary School in 2019, Lokhim

Educational institutions are increasing yearly and five schools are operational. in Solukhumbu District in the Sagarmatha Zone of north-eastern Nepal. At the time of the 1991 Nepal census it had a population of 3098 people living in 585 individual households.
