= Mabe, Nepal =

Former Village Development Committee in Nepal

Coordinates: 27°31′N 86°46′E

Pawai, Nepal पावै
- Village development committee
- Interactive map of Pawai, Nepal
- Country: Nepal
- Zone: Sagarmatha Zone
- District: Solukhumbu District

Population (1991)
  - Total: 2,180
- Time zone: UTC+5:45 (Nepal Time)

Pawai, Nepal is a village development committee in Solukhumbu District in the Sagarmatha Zone of north-eastern Nepal. At the time of the 1991 Nepal census it had a population of 2180 people living in 425 individual households.

It is mainly inhabitant by Rai, Sherpa, Gurung.
