= Nawang Sherpa =

Nepalese amputee who climbed Mount Everest

Nawang Sherpa (c. 1972) became the first person to climb Mount Everest with a prosthetic leg by reaching the summit on May 16, 2004. He is also the first amputee to reach the summit of Mount Everest on his first attempt, and the first disabled person from Asia to stand on the summit.

== Early life ==
Born in Tapting, a village in the Himalayan Solukhumbu region of Nepal, Nawang developed a passion for mountains at an early age. He dreamed of climbing Everest while training to become a high-altitude Sherpa mountain guide.

However, in 2000 after completing part of his training, he was involved in a traffic accident in Kathmandu, resulting in the amputation of his left leg. In May 2001, he traveled to California with the help of friends, where he received a prosthetic leg donated by the Orthopaedic Surgery Department at the University of California, San Francisco (UCSF). Arriving on crutches, he left a month later walking confidently on two legs.

== Mountain climbing ==
In the spring of 2002, Nawang met Ed Hommer, a renowned double amputee mountaineer, in Kathmandu. Hommer, who had just attempted Everest, invited him to join his expedition planned for 2003. Unfortunately, Hommer was killed in a rockfall during training on Mount Rainier later that year. Nevertheless, in 2004, Nawang’s friend Tom McMillan, receiving an invitation to climb Everest, invited Nawang to join him, setting the stage for their "Friendship Beyond Borders Expedition".

The High Exposure Foundation, founded by Hommer in the 1990s, stepped in to support Nawang's Everest dreams by providing advanced prosthetic equipment suitable for high-altitude climbing. Under the guidance of prosthetist Tom Halvorson, Nawang underwent fittings and training for extreme altitudes. His preparation involved extensive trekking through the Khumbu region, acclimatization ascents on Everest, and the final push to the summit during a favorable weather window. He opted not to undertake most physical training before the expedition due to concerns about injuring his knee or prosthetic leg. He suffered nausea during the climb, which prevented him from eating over the three-day ascent and two-day descent. On May 16, 2004, he reached the summit of Everest, becoming the first person wearing a prosthetic leg to do so.

In April 2006, Nawang participated in another expedition, attempting to ascend Cho Oyu, the sixth highest peak in the world. Supported by his younger brother Ang Dawa Sherpa and friend Nima Gombu Sherpa, the team faced record snowfall and logistical challenges that ultimately prevented them from reaching the summit.

His accomplishments received recognition, including the Everest Award from the Nepal Mountaineering Association and the Suprabal Gorakha Dakshin Bahu (Third) Gold Medal from His Majesty the King of Nepal.

== See also ==
- Mount Everest Timeline and Trivia
- Timeline of climbing Mount Everest
- List of people who died climbing Mount Everest
