= Takasindu =

Taksindu टाक्सिन्धु
- Village development committee
- Location in Nepal
- Coordinates: 27.65°N 86.65°E
- Country: Nepal
- Zone: Sagarmatha Zone
- District: Solukhumbu District

Population (2011)
  - Total: 2,177
- Time zone: UTC+5:45 (Nepal Time)

Taksindu is a ward in Solukhumbu District in the Province 1 of north-eastern Nepal. At the time of the 2011 Nepal census it had a population of 2177 people living in 510 individual households. Of the total population 1,065 (48.9%) were male and 1,172 (53.8%) were female( p 20). The ward has several villages, they are Chhulemu, Hewa, Deku, Nunthala, Akang, Ringbu, and Changa. There are several ethnic groups residing in the area, among them Sherpa, Rai, and Tamang. The ward is multilingual as the residents speak Sherpa, Rai, Tamang and Nepali languages. Major economic activity of the area are tourism, animal husbandry and agricultural production (p 3). Chongba Sherpa is the ward head of the Taksindu ward as of May 2022 election.

== Geography ==
Taksindu is situated between 27.60 Latitude and 86.61 Longitude. It has an elevation of 3130m (p 11)

== Notable people ==
- Babu Chiri Sherpa: World record holder mountaineer (1965-2001)
- Dachiiri Dawa Sherpa: Olympic athlete(1969–Present)
