= Power star =

Power star may refer to:

- Powerstar Golf, a video game developed by Zoë Mode
- Pawan Kalyan, an Indian film actor, popularly referred to as "Power Star Pawan Kalyan"
- Pawan Singh, an Indian film actor and singer, popularly referred to as "Power Star Pawan Singh"
- Puneeth Rajkumar, an Indian film actor, popularly referred to as "Power Star Puneeth Rajkumar"
- Srinivasan (Tamil actor), an Indian film actor, known as "Power Star Srinivasan"

== See also ==
- Star power (disambiguation)
- Power Stars, features in the video game Super Mario 64
- Ram Charan (born 1985), Indian actor, nicknamed "Mega Power Star"
