= Mukali =

Former Village Development Committee in Nepal

Mukli मुक्ली
- Village development committee
- Location in Nepal
- Coordinates: 27.44°N 86.68°E
- Country: Nepal
- Zone: Sagarmatha Zone
- District: Solukhumbu District

Population (1991)
  - Total: 2,651
- Time zone: UTC+5:45 (Nepal Time)

Mukli is Headquarter of Thulung Dudhkoshi Rural Municipality, Ward No. 6 formerly a Village Development Committee in Solukhumbu District in the Sagarmatha Zone of north-eastern Nepal. At the time of the 1991 Nepal census it had a population of 2651 people living in 501 individual households.

There are inhabitant of Thulung Rai, Gurung, Chettri, Tamang and Dalit community people.
