= Bung, Nepal =

Former Village Development Committee in Nepal

Bung, Nepal बुङ्
- Village development committee
- Location in Nepal
- Coordinates: 27°30′46″N 86°49′52″E
- Country: Nepal
- Zone: Sagarmatha Zone
- District: Solukhumbu District

Population (2011)
  - Total: 4,520
- Time zone: UTC+5:45 (Nepal Time)

Bung (Nepali: बुङ्) is a village development committee in Solukhumbu District in the Sagarmatha Zone of north-eastern Nepal. At the time of the 1991 Nepal census it had a population of 3368 people living in 737 individual households. At the 2011 census, the population of Bung was 4520 inhabitants (2247 male) in 982 individual households. Bung lies in the Himalaya mountains, 54 km South of Mount Everest and is bordered by the Hunku Drangka (East). Gudel lies on the other side of the valley of Bung.

== Villages and Hamlets ==
Bung consists of several settlements and Hamlets. The most important ones are:

- Bung (1,800 m 27.513031°N 86.831622°E)
- Chambaling Gompa (2,530 m 27.541591°N 86.815078°E)
- Khiraule (2,460 m 27.541676°N 86.814988°E)
- Surke (2,960 m 27.564390°N 86.813271°E)
