= Khumbu Pasanglhamu Rural Municipality =

Gaunpalika in Koshi Province, Nepal

Khumbu Pasanglhamu खुम्बु पासाङल्हामु गाउँपालिका
- Gaunpalika
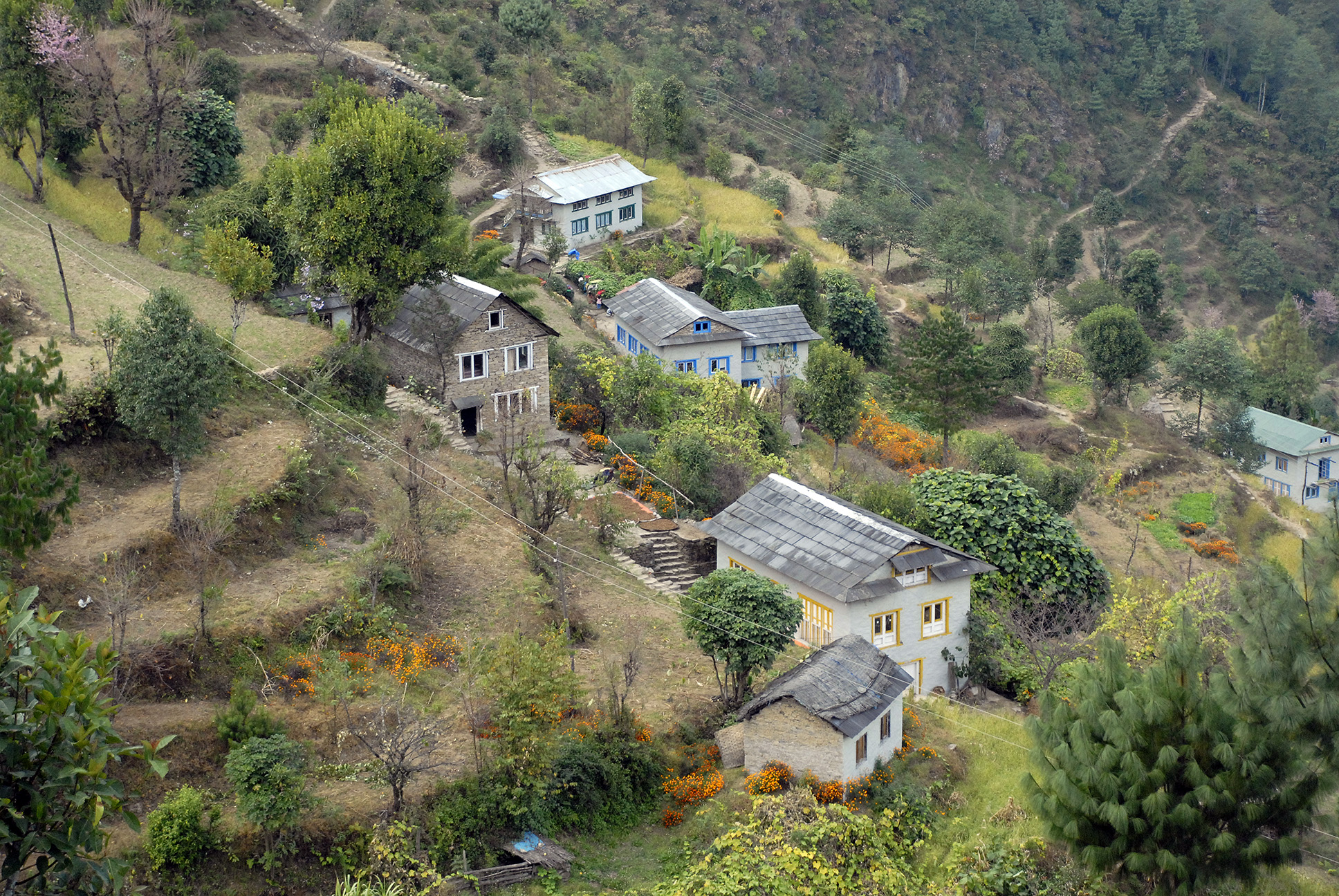
- A small settlement near Kharikhola, Khumbu Pasanglhamu

- Location in Province No. 1 Khumbu Pasanglhamu (Nepal)
- Coordinates (Chaurikharka): 27.74°N 86.73°E
- Country: Nepal
- Province: Province No. 1
- District: Solukhumbu District
- Wards: 5
- Established: 12 March 2017

Government
  - Type: Rural council
  - Body: Executive office of Khumbu Pasanglhamu Rural Municipality
  - Chairperson: Mr. Mingma Chhiri Sherpa
  - Vice-chairperson: Mrs.Tasilhamu Sherpa (NCP)
  - Chief Administrative Officer: Mr.Mohan Prasad Chapagain

Area
  - Total: 1,539.11 km^{2} (594.25 sq mi)
  - Rank: 5th (Nepal)
- Highest elevation: 8,848 m (29,029 ft)
- Lowest elevation: 1,900 m (6,200 ft)

Population (2011 Nepal census)
  - Total: 8,989
  - Density: 5.840/km^{2} (15.13/sq mi)
- Time zone: UTC+5:45 (Nepal Time)
- Area code: +977-38
- HQ: Office of Chaurikharka
- Website: Official website

Khumbu Pasanglhamu (Nepali: खुम्बु पासाङल्हामु गाउँपालिका) is one of 7 rural municipalities (Gaunpalika) in Solukhumbu district of Province No. 1 of Nepal. Khumjung, Namche & Jubing (1,5,7–9 No. Wards of Jubing) and Chaurikharka were incorporated while creating it. It has the total population of 9,133 according to the 2011 Nepal census and area of 1,539.11 square kilometres (594.25 mi^{2}). The admin centre of this gaunpalika is that of the Chaurikharka.

Previously, Khumjung, Namche, Jubing and Chaurikharka were all separate local level body (Village development committee) of Solukhumbu District. Solukhumbu was a district out of six districts of Sagarmatha Zone. Sagarmatha was a zone (division) of Eastern development region of Nepal.

== Etymology ==
Khumbu Pasanglhamu is located in Solukhumbu District, which name also bear Khumbu. "Solukhumbu" is a combination of two words; "Solu" and "Khumbu". Solu is lower part, while Khumbu is upper part of Solukhumbu District. The "Pasanglhamu" word is taken from Pasang Lhamu Sherpa, who was first Nepalese woman who climbed Mount Everest, she hailed from Khumbu region.

== Geography and Climate ==
Khumbu Pasanglhamu is situated at coordinates 27.74° N 86.73° E Latitude and longitude. It is on northernmost part of Province, which is highest altitude land on Earth, part of higher Himalayas. Geographical condition of Khumbu Pasanglhamu is very difficult. It is the highest elevated land of the world. The minimum elevation of the region is 1,900 metres (6,200 ft), whereas the maximum elevation is 8,848 metres (29,029 ft). The total area of the rural municipality is 1,539.11 square kilometres (594.25 sq mi), thus it is the second largest Gaunpalika (by area) of Province No. 1 after Phaktanglung which is situated in Taplejung District.

Lhotse, Nuptse, Cho Oyu, Ama Dablam, Pumori, Thamserku etc. are the mountains located in this region. Kharikhola, Lukla, Phskding, Manju, Namche, Khumjung, Khunde, Tengboche, Forche, Pangboche, Phiriche etc. are the human settlement in the region.

The elevations of Khumbu Pasanglhamu is not equal, it starts from 2000m and ends at 8848m thus the climate in the region can be divided into four climate zones owing to the gradual rise in altitude. The climatic zones include a forested lower zone, a zone of alpine scrub, the upper alpine zone which includes upper limit of vegetation growth, and the Arctic zone thus the temperature and weather conditions vary at different altitudes or zones. The upper zones are snow-capped mountains which is too cold and the lower zone's valleys are some less cold.

Climate data for Khumbu Pasanglhamu (Chaurikharka) (1982-2012)
Month	Jan	Feb	Mar	Apr	May	Jun	Jul	Aug	Sep	Oct	Nov	Dec	Year
Mean daily maximum °C (°F)	9.3 (48.7)	10.5 (50.9)	13.5 (56.3)	17.3 (63.1)	18.4 (65.1)	19.1 (66.4)	19.1 (66.4)	19.4 (66.9)	18.1 (64.6)	16.9 (62.4)	13.3 (55.9)	10.7 (51.3)	15.5 (59.8)
Daily mean °C (°F)	3.7 (38.7)	5.1 (41.2)	8 (46)	11.5 (52.7)	13.1 (55.6)	15 (59)	15.4 (59.7)	15.4 (59.7)	14.1 (57.4)	11.8 (53.2)	7.6 (45.7)	4.9 (40.8)	10.5 (50.8)
Mean daily minimum °C (°F)	−1.9 (28.6)	−0.2 (31.6)	2.6 (36.7)	5.8 (42.4)	7.9 (46.2)	10.9 (51.6)	11.8 (53.2)	11.4 (52.5)	10.2 (50.4)	6.7 (44.1)	1.9 (35.4)	−0.8 (30.6)	5.5 (41.9)
Average precipitation mm (inches)	16 (0.6)	30 (1.2)	34 (1.3)	60 (2.4)	107 (4.2)	301 (11.9)	555 (21.9)	479 (18.9)	288 (11.3)	90 (3.5)	12 (0.5)	10 (0.4)	1,982 (78.1)
Source: Climate-data.org

Landmarks of Khumbu Pasanglhamu
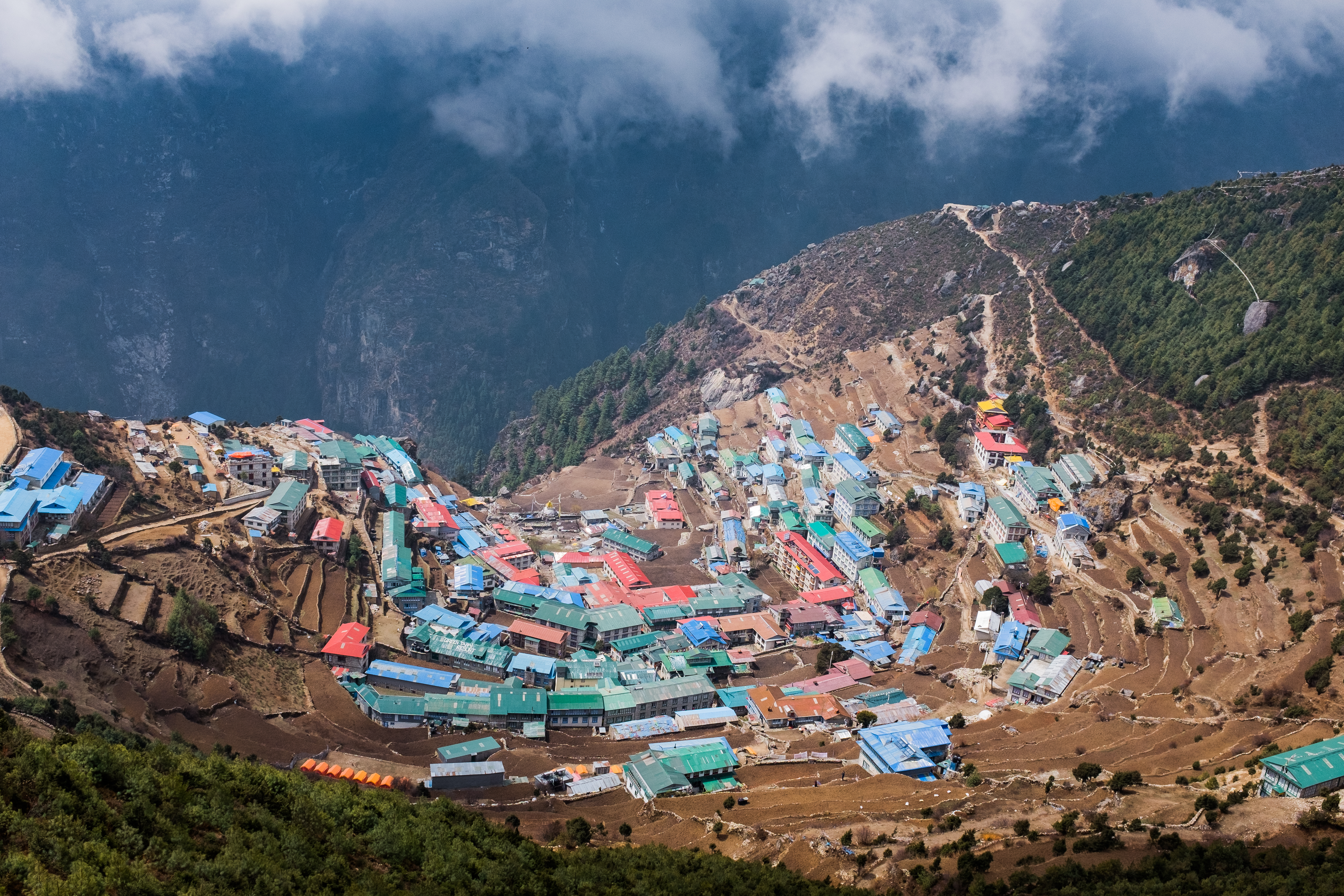
Namche Bazar

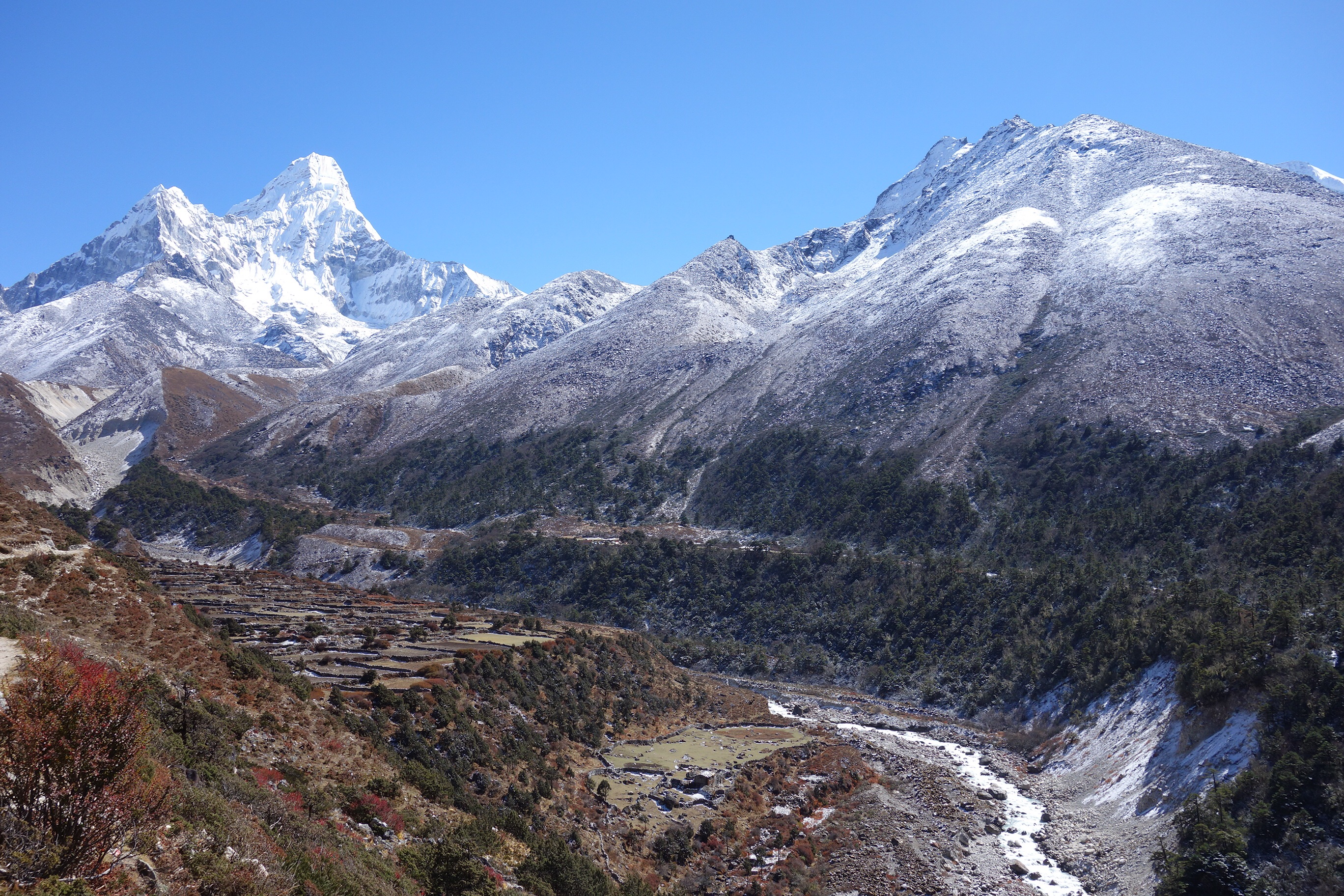
Mount Ama Dablam

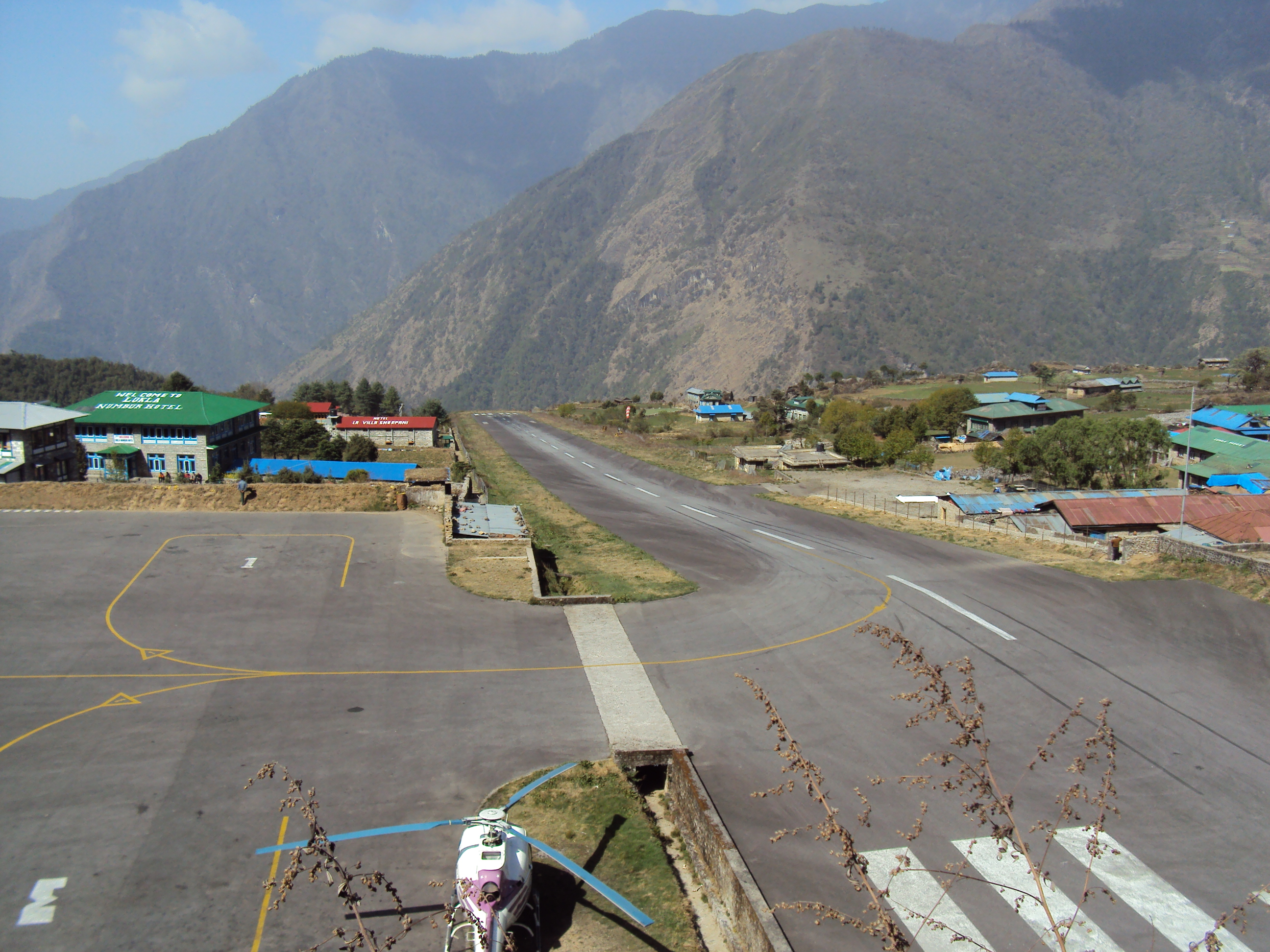
Lukla Airport

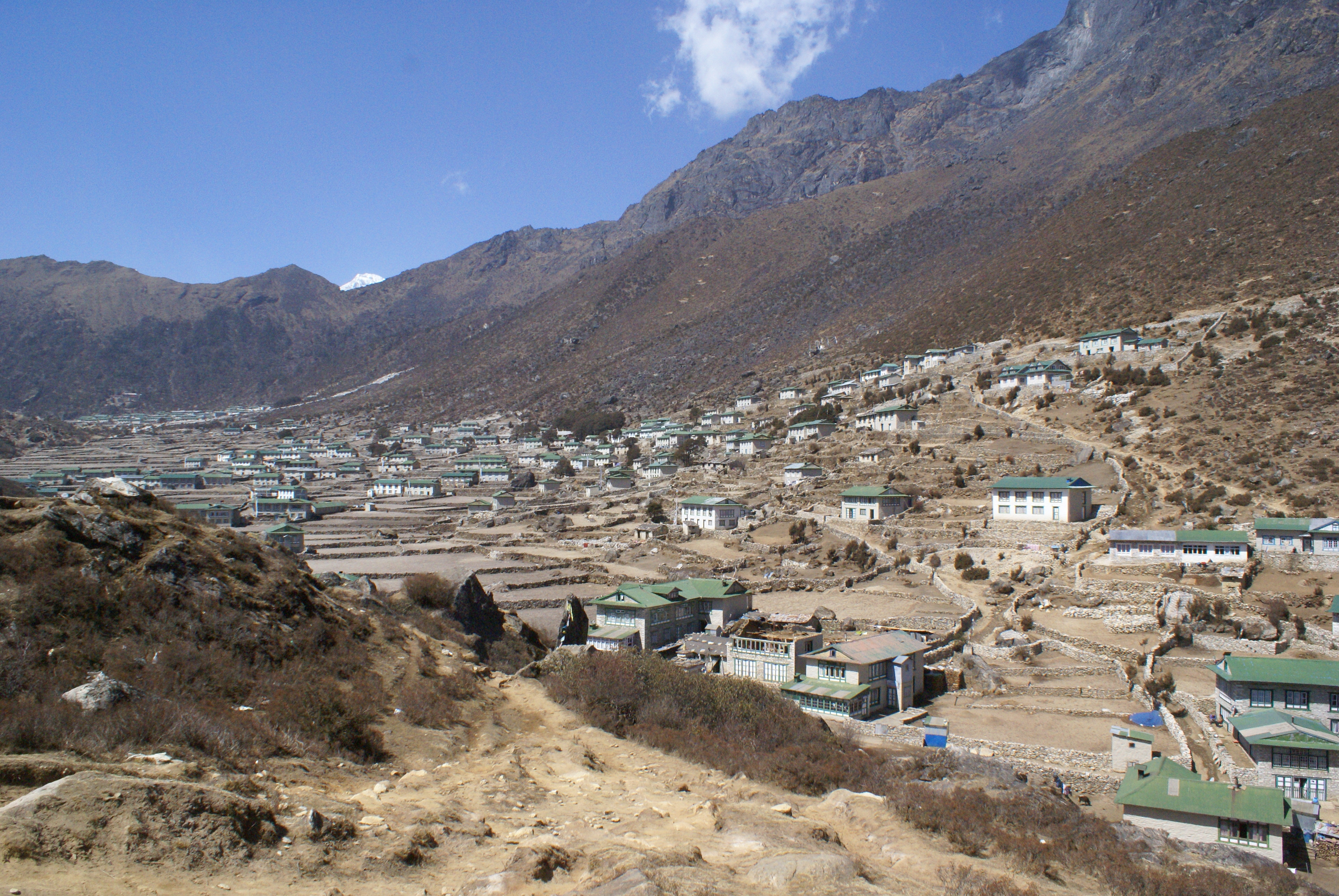
Khumjung Village
