= Bhakanje =

Former Village Development Committee in Nepal

Bhakanje भकान्जे
- Village development committee
- Location in Nepal
- Coordinates: 27.59°N 86.46°E
- Country: Nepal
- Zone: Sagarmatha Zone
- District: Solukhumbu District

Population (1991)
  - Total: 1,188
- Time zone: UTC+5:45 (Nepal Time)

Bhakanje is a village development committee in Solukhumbu District in the Sagarmatha Zone of north-eastern Nepal. At the time of the 1991 Nepal census it had a population of 1188 people living in 226 individual households.
