= BaFa' BaFa' =

Game simulating contact between cultures

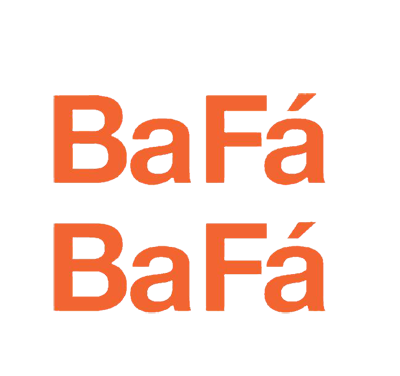
Logo

BaFá BaFá is a face-to-face learning simulation (game), invented by Dr. R. Garry Shirts in 1974, who also invented StarPower, and is published by Simulation Training Systems, Inc. The simulation is intended to improve participants' cross-cultural competence by helping them understand the impact of culture on the behavior of people and organizations. Participants experience "culture shock" by traveling to and trying to interact with a culture in which the people have different values, different ways of behaving and different ways of solving problems.

== Versions ==
There are three versions, one for high schools, charities and universities, one for middle school aged children called RaFá RaFá, and a professional version for business and government agencies.

== Uses ==
BaFá BaFá is adaptable and has been used in many different settings including with any groups that have different cultures, whether because of geographical location, political beliefs, race, organizational structure, mergers, sexual orientation, etc. Some examples of ways it has been used:

- Training or teaching about diversity/inclusion.
- Sociology classes.
- Management Training.
- Preparing people to travel to different cultures (Peace Corps, missionaries, military).
- Medical professionals, staff and educators.
- Orientations (student and staff).
