= Bapha =

Former Village Development Committee in Nepal

Bapha बाफा
- Village development committee
- Country: Nepal
- Zone: Sagarmatha Zone
- District: Solukhumbu District

Population (1991)
  - Total: 3,031
- Time zone: UTC+5:45 (Nepal Time)

Bapha is a village development committee in Solukhumbu District in the Sagarmatha Zone of north-eastern Nepal. At the time of the 1991 Nepal census it had a population of 3,031 people living in 579 individual households.
