= Kangel =

Former Village Development Committee in Nepal

Kangel कांगेल
- Village development committee
- Location in Nepal
- Coordinates: 27°25′12″N 86°39′36″E
- Country: Nepal
- Zone: Sagarmatha Zone
- District: Solukhumbu District

Population (1991)
  - Total: 2,087
- Time zone: UTC+5:45 (Nepal Time)

Kangel is a village development committee in Solukhumbu District in the Sagarmatha Zone of north-eastern Nepal. At the time of the 1991 Nepal census it had a population of 2087 people living in 416 individual households.
