= Chaulakharka =

Village development committee in Sagarmatha Zone, Nepal

Chaulakharka चौलाखर्क
- Village development committee
- Location in Nepal
- Coordinates: 27.56°N 86.39°E
- Country: Nepal
- Zone: Sagarmatha Zone
- District: Solukhumbu District

Population (1991)
  - Total: 1,839
- Time zone: UTC+5:45 (Nepal Time)

Chaulakharka is a village development committee in Solukhumbu District in the Sagarmatha Zone of north-eastern Nepal. At the time of the 1991 Nepal census it had a population of 1839 people living in 372 individual households.
