= Goli, Solukhumbu =

Former Village Development Committee in Nepal

Goli गोली
- Village development committee
- Location in Nepal
- Coordinates: 27.53°N 86.42°E
- Country: Nepal
- Zone: Sagarmatha Zone
- District: Solukhumbu District

Population (1991)
  - Total: 2,276
- Time zone: UTC+5:45 (Nepal Time)

Goli is a village development committee in Solukhumbu District in the Sagarmatha Zone of north-eastern Nepal. At the time of the 1991 Nepal census it had a population of 2276 people living in 455 individual households.
