= Nele =

Former village development committee in Nepal

Nele नेले
- Village development committee
- Location in Nepal
- Coordinates: 27.45°N 86.64°E
- Country: Nepal
- Zone: Sagarmatha Zone
- District: Solukhumbu District

Population (1991)
  - Total: 2,021
- Time zone: UTC+5:45 (Nepal Time)
- Postal code: 56006
- Area code: 038

Nele (Nepali: नेले) is a village development committee in Solukhumbu District in the Sagarmatha Zone of north-eastern Nepal. At the time of the 1991 Nepal census it had a population of 2021 people living in 364 individual households.
