= Sangkhuwa River =

Location
- Country: Nepal

Basin features
- River system: Koshi River

The Sangkhuwa is a river and valley in the Sankhuwasawa District. It is a tributary of the Arun.
