= Jubing =

Former Village Development Committee in Nepal

Jubing जुबिङ
- Village development committee
- Location in Nepal
- Coordinates: 27.62°N 86.73°E
- Country: Nepal
- Zone: Sagarmatha Zone
- District: Solukhumbu District

Population (1991)
  - Total: 2,704
- Time zone: UTC+5:45 (Nepal Time)

Jubing was a village development committee in Solukhumbu District in the Sagarmatha Zone of north-eastern Nepal. It was divided and merged into two new formed Rural municipality in 2017 when the old administrative structures were reconstructed. Ward no. 2, 3, 4 and 6 were incorporated with Dudhkoshi rural municipality and remaining all wards 1, 5, 7, 8 and 9 were incorporated with Khumbu Pasanglhamu rural municipality.

At the time of the 1991 Nepal census it had a population of 2704 people living in 550 individual households.
