= StarPower =

Multiplayer educational game

- Players: 12-35 (18-35 recommended)
- Setup time: < 30 minutes
- Playing time: About two hours
- Chance: some ^{1}
- Skills: negotiation, basic math
- 1. In service to the educational goal of the game, chance and skill have a smaller impact on the game than players are initially led to believe.

StarPower is an educational game for 12 to 35 players, designed by R. Garry Shirts for Simulation Training Systems in 1969. The game combines chance and skill at trading to establish a score. Players are assigned categories based upon their relative scores, with the highest scoring category being able to change the rules. The game is designed to illustrate the behavior of human beings in a system that naturally stratifies them economically or politically.

== Play ==
Players randomly draw lots of colored chips. These chips have different number value based on their color. Players are given the opportunity to trade these chips to increase their point total. Players are told to not share information about their chips. While players are told that the group assignment is based on "achievement" or "merit", the initial distribution dominates the resulting scores.

Each round, players draw random colored chips and trade them for sets of points. At the end of each round players are assigned one of three groups and given an associated badge based on their score. The top scorers are red squares, the middle are blue circles, and the low scorers are green triangles. Starting on turn two (the first turn in which players are assigned to groups), the red squares players draw from a bag with higher scoring chips, while the green triangles draw from a bag with lower scoring chips. As a result, movement between groups becomes uncommon. Starting on the third round, the red squares are free to change the rules however they like.

Key to the game's educational effectiveness is for those running the game to withhold details about the true nature and implementation. That the red squares can change the rules is only revealed to players when the ability is added to the game.

Starpower is by design a very unbalanced game. Game designer James Wallis has gone so far as to describe the game as "broken" "by all conventional standards of game design." The unbalanced nature of the game reduces its replayability. Shirts views StarPower as more of a simulation than a game and as a result does not view replayability as an important goal.

== Typical results ==
One commentator writing for the Sustainability Institute claimed that square players typically rigged the game to benefit squares, circles strove to become squares at which point they began to act like squares, and that triangles became angry and then apathetic, only becoming interested at the possibility of cheating or revolution. At the end of the game, the squares seldom see the oppression they engaged in while the circles are viewed as sell-outs by the triangles and as incompetent by the squares.

Another commentator notes similar results. The squares create oppressive rules that make it difficult for lower groups to advance. Lower groups turn to cheating. The commentator also noted the lower groups becoming apathetic.

The official site for the game lists eight lessons that StarPower teaches, mostly focused on the results of inequal distribution of power.

== See also ==
- BaFa' BaFa' - cross cultural competence game by R. Garry Shirts
