= Sisuwa River =

River in Nepal

Location
- Country: Nepal

Physical characteristics
- Mouth
  - location: Arun River

Basin features
- River system: Koshi River

The Sisuwa is a river and valley in the Sankhuwasawa District. It is a tributary of the Arun.
