= Jubu, Nepal =

Former Village Development Committee in Nepal

Jubu, Nepal जुबु
- Village development committee
- Location in Nepal
- Coordinates: 27.42°N 86.72°E
- Country: Nepal
- Zone: Sagarmatha Zone
- District: Solukhumbu District

Population (1991)
  - Total: 3,544
- Time zone: UTC+5:45 (Nepal Time)
- Postal code: 56005
- Area code: 038

Jubu is a village development committee in Solukhumbu District in the Sagarmatha Zone of north-eastern Nepal. At the time of the 1991 Nepal census it had a population of 3544 people living in 706 individual households.
