= Kaku, Nepal =

Former Village Development Committee in Nepal

Kanku, Nepal काँकु
- Village development committee
- Location in Nepal
- Coordinates: 27.50°N 86.65°E
- Country: Nepal
- Zone: Sagarmatha Zone
- District: Solukhumbu District

Population (1991)
  - Total: 3,896
- Time zone: UTC+5:45 (Nepal Time)

Kaku, Nepal is a village development committee in Solukhumbu District in the Sagarmatha Zone of north-eastern Nepal. At the time of the 1991 Nepal census it had a population of 3896 people living in 750 individual households.
