= Baku, Nepal =

Former Village Development Committee in Nepal

Baku, Nepal बाकु
- Village development committee
- Location in Nepal
- Coordinates: 27.54°N 86.74°E
- Country: Nepal
- Zone: Sagarmatha Zone
- District: Solukhumbu District

Population (2011)
  - Total: 4,844
- Time zone: UTC+5:45 (Nepal Time)

Baku is a village development committee (VDC) in Solukhumbu District in the Sagarmatha Zone of north-eastern Nepal. Baku lies in the Himalaya, 59 km South of Mount Everest and is bordered by the valleys of the Dudh Kosi River (West) and Hinku Drangka River (East). At the time of the 1991 Nepal census it had a population of 4159 people living in 777 individual households. At the time of the 2011 census, the population of the VDC Baku was 4844 inhabitants (2380 male) in 963 individual households.

== Villages and hamlets ==
Baku consists of several settlements and hamlets. The most important ones are:

- Baku (1,600 m 27.497859°N 86.707079°E)
- Sibuje (2,520 m 27.584683°N 86.771029°E)
