= Basa, Nepal =

Former Village Development Committee in Nepal

Basa, Nepal बासा
- Village development committee
- Location in Nepal
- Coordinates: 27.54°N 86.68°E
- Country: Nepal
- Zone: Sagarmatha Zone
- District: Solukhumbu District

Population (1991)
  - Total: 3,256
- Time zone: UTC+5:45 (Nepal Time)

Basa, Nepal is a village development committee in Solukhumbu District in the Sagarmatha Zone of north-eastern Nepal. At the time of the 1991 Nepal census it had a population of 3256.
