= Panchan, Nepal =

Panchan, Nepal पञ्चन
- Village development committee
- Location in Nepal
- Coordinates: 27.39°N 86.66°E
- Country: Nepal
- Zone: Sagarmatha Zone
- District: Solukhumbu District

Population (1991)
  - Total: 1,698
- Time zone: UTC+5:45 (Nepal Time)

Panchan, Nepal is a village development committee in Solukhumbu District in the Sagarmatha Zone of north-eastern Nepal. At the time of the 1991 Nepal census it had a population of 1698 people living in 318 individual households.
