= Hongu River =

River in Nepal

Location
- Country: Nepal

Physical characteristics
- Mouth
  - location: Hinku River

Basin features
- River system: Kosi River

The Hongu River is a major river and valley in the Sankhuwasawa District of Koshi Province in Nepal. It is a tributary of the Hinku River, which subsequently flows into the Dudh Kosi.

The Hongu Valley is at the back of the Everest region. It has views of the peaks of Everest, Lhotse, Nuptse and Ama Dablam. The Hongu basin is a river valley which feeds a group of lakes. The Hongu region offers one of the finest wilderness treks in Nepal where even huts and herds are rarely seen.

Both the Hongu and Hinku valleys remain uninhabited, although there are kharka in the upper Hinku basin where Sherpas from the south, near Pangkongma, graze their animals during the grass-growing monsoon.
