= Solukhumbu District =

Solukhumbu District ཤར་ཁུམ་བུ་རྫོང
- District
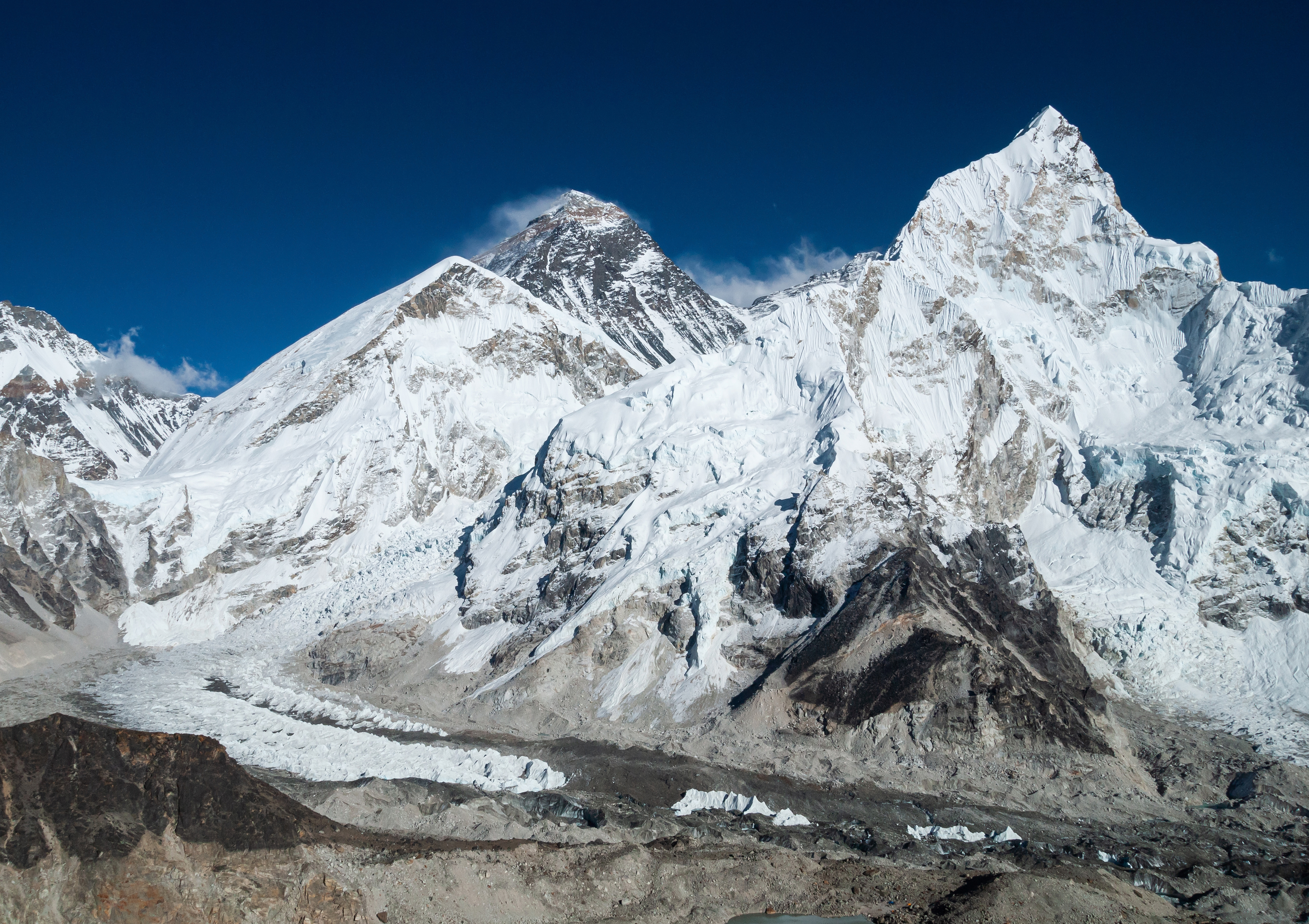
- View of Mount Everest from Kala Patthar
- Nickname: Khumbu
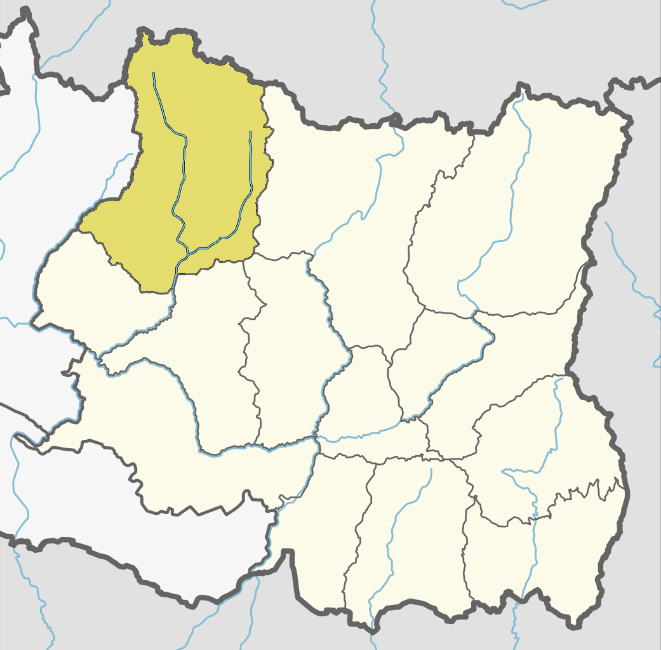
- Location of Solukhumbu

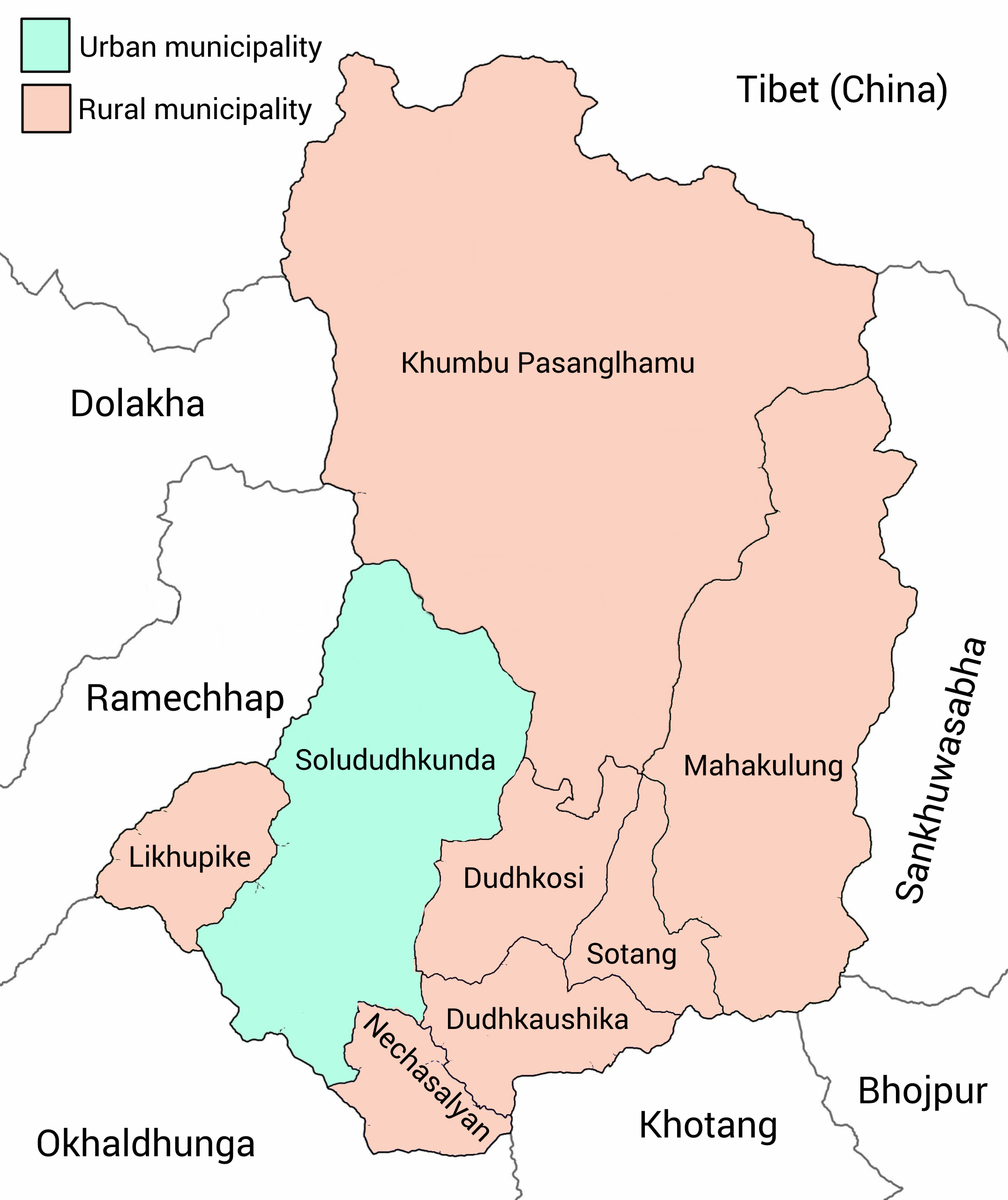
- Divisions of Solukhumbu District
- Coordinates: 27°20′39″N 86°0′21″E to 28°6′24″N 87°0′1″E
- Country: Nepal
- Province: Koshi Province
- Established: 1962
- Admin HQ.: Salleri
- Municipality: List: Urban; Dudhkunda; Rural; Thulung Dudhkoshi; Necha Salyan; Dudhkoshi; Maha Kulung; Sotang; Khumbu Pasanglhamu; Likhu Pike

Government
  - Type: Coordination committee
  - Body: DCC, Solukhumbu
  - Head: Bir Kumar Rai (NCP)
  - Parliamentary constituencies: 1
  - Provincial constituencies: 2
  - Chief District Officer: Anoj Kumar Ghimire

Area
  - Total: 3,312 km^{2} (1,279 sq mi)
- Highest elevation: 8,848 m (29,029 ft)
- Lowest elevation: 600 m (2,000 ft)

Population (2021)
  - Total: 104,851
  - Density: 31.66/km^{2} (81.99/sq mi)
  - Households: 23,758

Demographics
  - Ethnic groups: Rai; Sherpa; Chhetri; Tamang; Kulung Rai; Kami; Magar; Bahun; Nachhiring Rai; Newar; Damai; Thulung Rai
  - Female ♀: 52%

Human Development Index
  - Income per capita (US dollars): $1,841 per capita
  - Poverty rate: 25.7
  - Literacy: 64%
  - Life Expectancy: 68.8
- Time zone: UTC+05:45 (NPT)
- Postal Codes: 56000..., 56010
- Telephone Code: 38
- Website: ddcsolukhumbu.gov.np

Solukhumbu District (Nepali: सोलुखुम्बु जिल्ला [solukʰumbu], Sherpa: ཤར་ཁུམ་བུ་རྫོང་།, Wylie: shar khum bu dzong) is one of 14 districts of Koshi Province of eastern Nepal. As the name suggests, it consists of the sub-regions Solu and Khumbu. The closest post office to Solukhumbu with a postal code assigned to it is the Sindhuli D.P.O., which has the postal code 56000.

The district, with Salleri as its headquarters, covers an area of 3,312 km^{2} (1,279 sq mi) and had a population of 104,851 in 2021, 105,886 in 2011, and 107,686 in 2001.

Mount Everest is in the northern part of this district, within Sagarmatha National Park.

== History ==
Historically, Solukhumbu was part of Kirata Kingdoms in early and medieval era. It was a part of Majh Kirat Khambuwan (central province or region of Kirat Kingdoms).

Before the unification of Nepal by king of Gorkha, what is now Solukhumbu district was part of Chaudandi of Majh Kirat (Khambuwan). In 1773 AD the King of Gorkha attacked and absorbed it into Nepal.

The Solukhumbu district was established in 1962, out of the old East No. 3 district. Before 1962, present-day Solukhumbu, Okhaldhunga and some parts of Khotang previously constitute district "East No. 3". Solu and Rawa thums (counties) were carved out of East No. 3 to create Solukhumbu District.

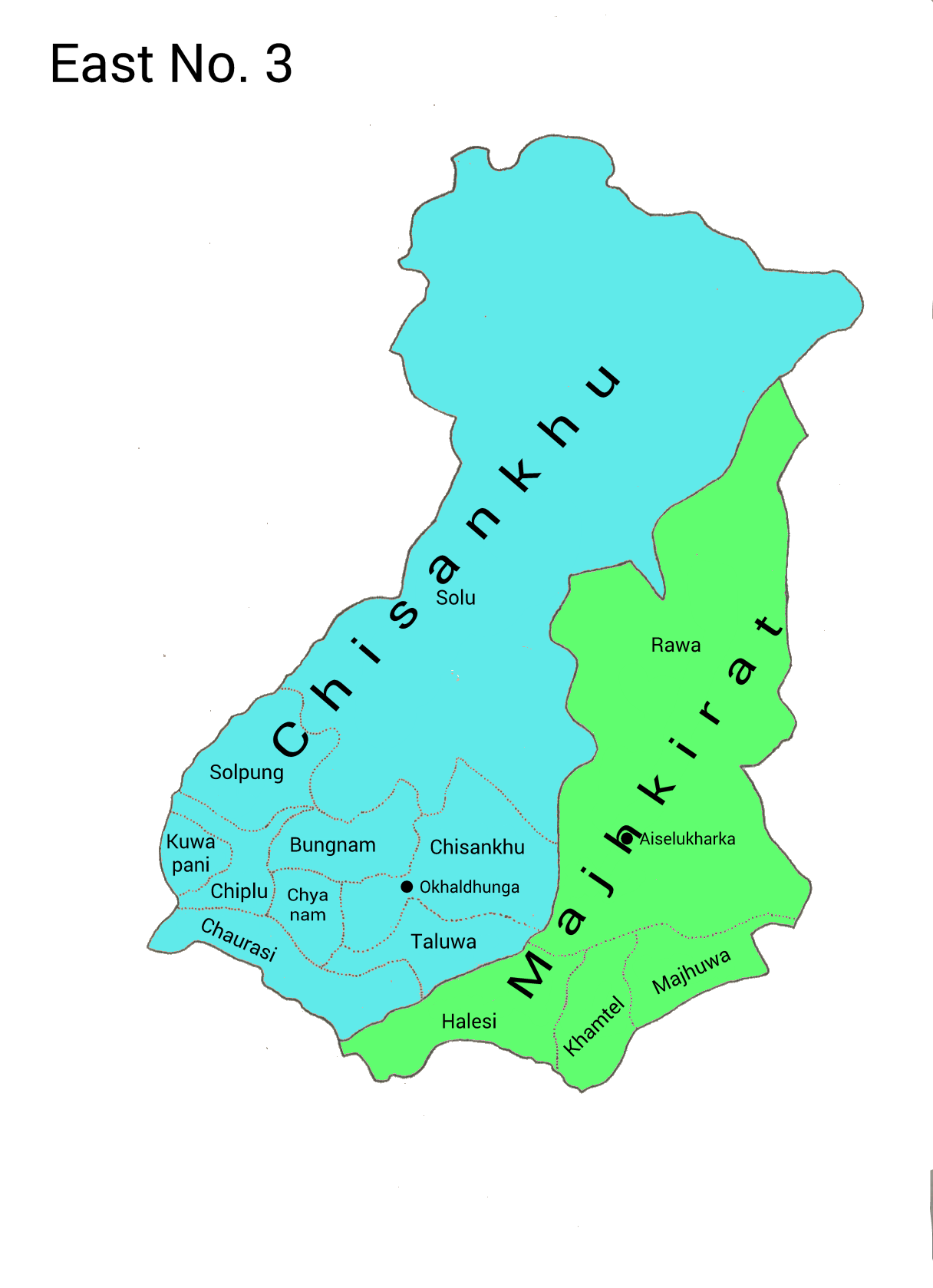
East No. 3, a district of Nepal before 1962.

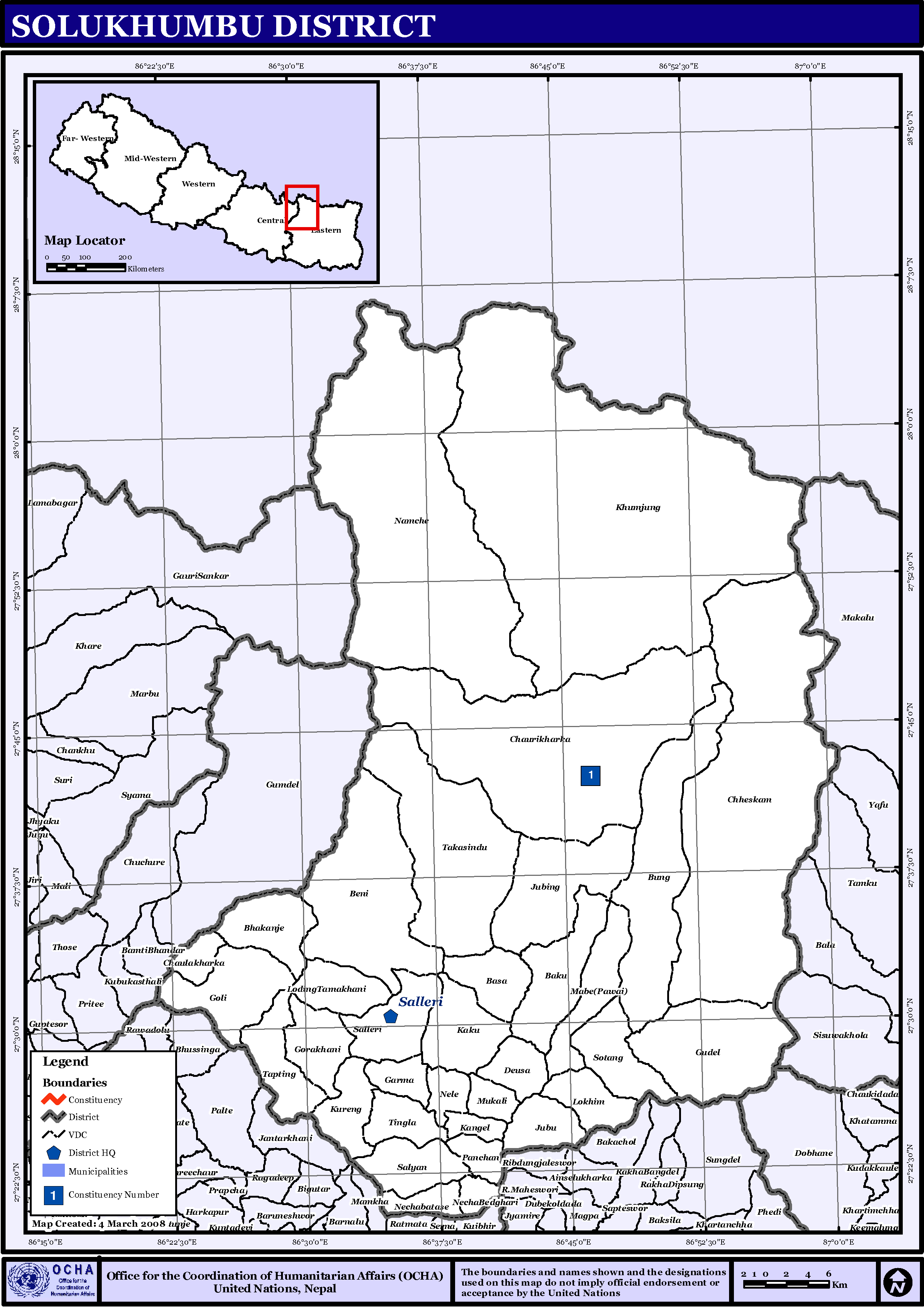
VDCs of Solukhumbu before 2015.

== Geography ==
Solukhumbu is one of three Himalayan districts within Province No. 1, positioned on the west-by-northwestern corner of the province. It spans a total area of 3,312 square kilometres (1,279 mi^{2}). It is geographically situated between latitudes 27°20'39" and 28°6'24" North, and longitudes 86°0'21" and 87°0'1" East. Its north border includes the world's highest peak 8,848 metres (29,029 ft) (Mount Everest); and the district's lowest point is at 600 metres (2,000 ft) (Tuintar) above sea level. The district is bordered by Sankhuwasabha in the east, Bhojpur in the south-east, Khotang and Okhaldhunga in the south, Bagmati Province in the west and Tibet (China) in the north.

Salleri, the headquarters of the district, is situated 267 km northeast of the capital Kathmandu and 300 km north of the provincial capital of Biratnagar (by road).

The diverse geography of Solukhumbu district is marked by three distinct levels:

=== Khumbu Himal (Highland mountains) ===
This region is home to the Mahalangur Himal and other Himalayan mountain ranges. Situated on the northern border with Tibet, it hosts some of the world's highest peaks, including Mount Everest (8,848m), Lhotse (8,516m), Makalu (8,485m), Cho Oyu (8,201m), Gyachung Kang (7,952m), among others.

=== Khumbu region (Highland valley) ===
Known globally for its trekking and hiking opportunities, the highland Khumbu valley is predominantly inhabited by the Kulung and Sherpa communities. The administrative division of Khumbu Pasanglhamu is located in this region, encompassing the roadless town of Namche Bazaar and villages such as Thame, Khumjung, Pangboche, Pheriche and Kunde. The renowned Buddhist monastery at Tengboche also falls within the Khumbu region.

=== Solu region (Mid-hills) ===
Lower Solukhumbu (lower parts of Solukhumbu District) is part of the Mid-hills region. It is less famous for trekking, however new trails such as the Mundhum trail are being developed. Rais are the main inhabitants in this region.

== Climate ==
Climate Zone	Elevation Range	% of Area
Upper Tropical	300 to 1,000 meters 1,000 to 3,300 ft.	0.7%
Subtropical	1,000 to 2,000 meters 3,300 to 6,600 ft.	9.3%
Temperate	2,000 to 3,000 meters 6,400 to 9,800 ft.	20.6%
Subalpine	3,000 to 4,000 meters 9,800 to 13,100 ft.	16.6%
Alpine	4,000 to 5,000 meters 13,100 to 16,400 ft.	28.3%
Nival	above 5,000 meters	24.4%

Climate data for Salleri
Month	Jan	Feb	Mar	Apr	May	Jun	Jul	Aug	Sep	Oct	Nov	Dec	Year
Mean daily maximum °C (°F)	23.1 (73.6)	25.8 (78.4)	31.0 (87.8)	35.1 (95.2)	35.0 (95.0)	34.9 (94.8)	32.5 (90.5)	32.8 (91.0)	32.5 (90.5)	31.6 (88.9)	29.0 (84.2)	24.8 (76.6)	30.7 (87.2)
Mean daily minimum °C (°F)	9.2 (48.6)	11.0 (51.8)	15.1 (59.2)	19.4 (66.9)	21.2 (70.2)	22.9 (73.2)	23.8 (74.8)	24.2 (75.6)	23.8 (74.8)	21.2 (70.2)	15.8 (60.4)	10.6 (51.1)	18.2 (64.7)
Average precipitation mm (inches)	1 (0.0)	1 (0.0)	1 (0.0)	2 (0.1)	4 (0.2)	7 (0.3)	16 (0.6)	12 (0.5)	10 (0.4)	3 (0.1)	0 (0)	1 (0.0)	58 (2.2)
Source: www.yr.no

Climate data for Syangboche
Month	Jan	Feb	Mar	Apr	May	Jun	Jul	Aug	Sep	Oct	Nov	Dec	Year
Mean daily maximum °C (°F)	3.8 (38.8)	4.3 (39.7)	8 (46)	11.7 (53.1)	13.3 (55.9)	14.4 (57.9)	14.2 (57.6)	14.2 (57.6)	13.1 (55.6)	11.6 (52.9)	7.9 (46.2)	5.7 (42.3)	10.2 (50.3)
Mean daily minimum °C (°F)	−8.9 (16.0)	−8 (18)	−4.7 (23.5)	−2.4 (27.7)	0.2 (32.4)	4.1 (39.4)	5.3 (41.5)	4.7 (40.5)	3.4 (38.1)	−0.5 (31.1)	−5.5 (22.1)	−7.1 (19.2)	−1.6 (29.1)
Average precipitation mm (inches)	13 (0.5)	17 (0.7)	25 (1.0)	28 (1.1)	38 (1.5)	131 (5.2)	221 (8.7)	206 (8.1)	128 (5.0)	54 (2.1)	5 (0.2)	6 (0.2)	872 (34.3)
Source: www.climate-data.org

== Administrative divisions ==
Solukhumbu is divided into eight local level units, one unit is urban and seven are rural. They are further divided into wards. Solukhumbu is single-seat constituency for parliamentary constituency and double seat for provincial constituency. Solukhumbu district coordination committee coordinates between local and provincial governments. Solukhumbu district administration office co-operates with Solukhumbu DCC to maintain peace, order and security in the district. The officer of District Administration office called CDO.

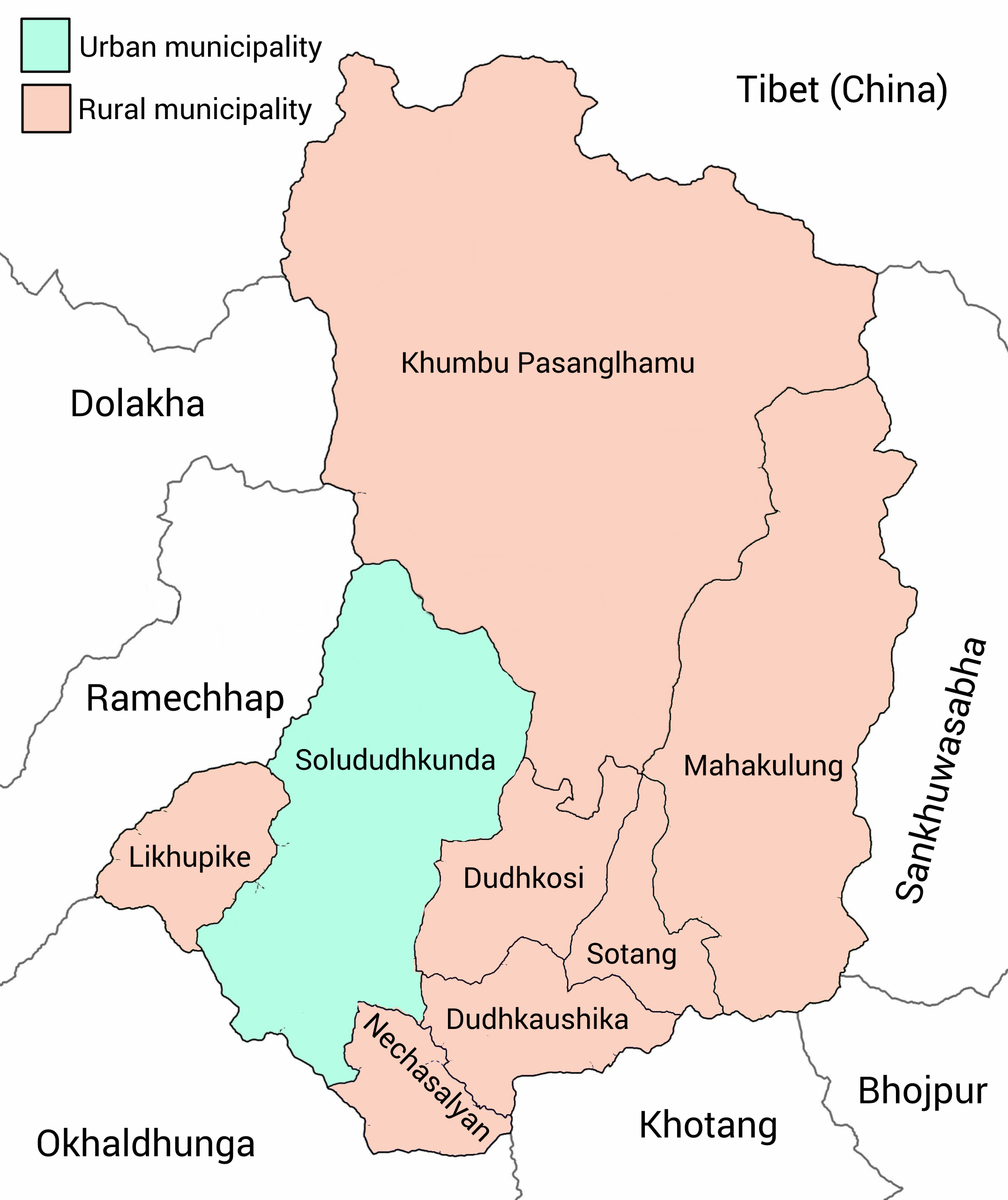

Local units	Nepali	Type	Population (2011)	Area KM^{2}	Website
Solududhkunda	सोलुदूधकुण्ड	urban	20,399	538.09	solududhkundamun.gov.np
Dudhakaushika	दूधकौशिका	rural	19,672	144.6	dudhkaushikamun.gov.np
Necha Salyan	नेचा सल्यान	rural	16,129	94.49	nechasalyanmun.gov.np
Dudhkoshi	दुधकोसी	rural	13,414	167.67	dudhkoshimun.gov.np
Maha Kulung	महाकुलूङ्ग	rural	11,452	648.05	mahakulungmun.gov.np
Sotang	सोतांग	rural	9,530	103	sotangmun.gov.np
Likhu Pike	लिखु पीके	rural	5,534	124.38	likhupikemun.gov.np
Khumbu Pasanglhamu	खुम्बु पासाङल्हामु	rural	8,989	1539.11	khumbupasanglhamumun.gov.np

Constituency	Type	MP/MLA	Party
Solukhumbu 1	Parliamentary	Hem Kumar Rai	Nepal Communist Party
Solukhumbu 1(A)	Provincial	Uttam Kumar Basnet	Nepal Communist Party
Solukhumbu 1(B)	Provincial	Buddhi Kumar Rajbhandari	Nepal Communist Party

=== Former divisions (1990–2016) ===
Formerly, Solukhumbu district was divided into many Village development committees. In 2014 Dudhkunda municipality was established merging some Village development committees. In 2016 all other Village development committee nullified and introduced rural municipality thus all former Village development committees grouped into 7 units and announced 7 rural municipality.

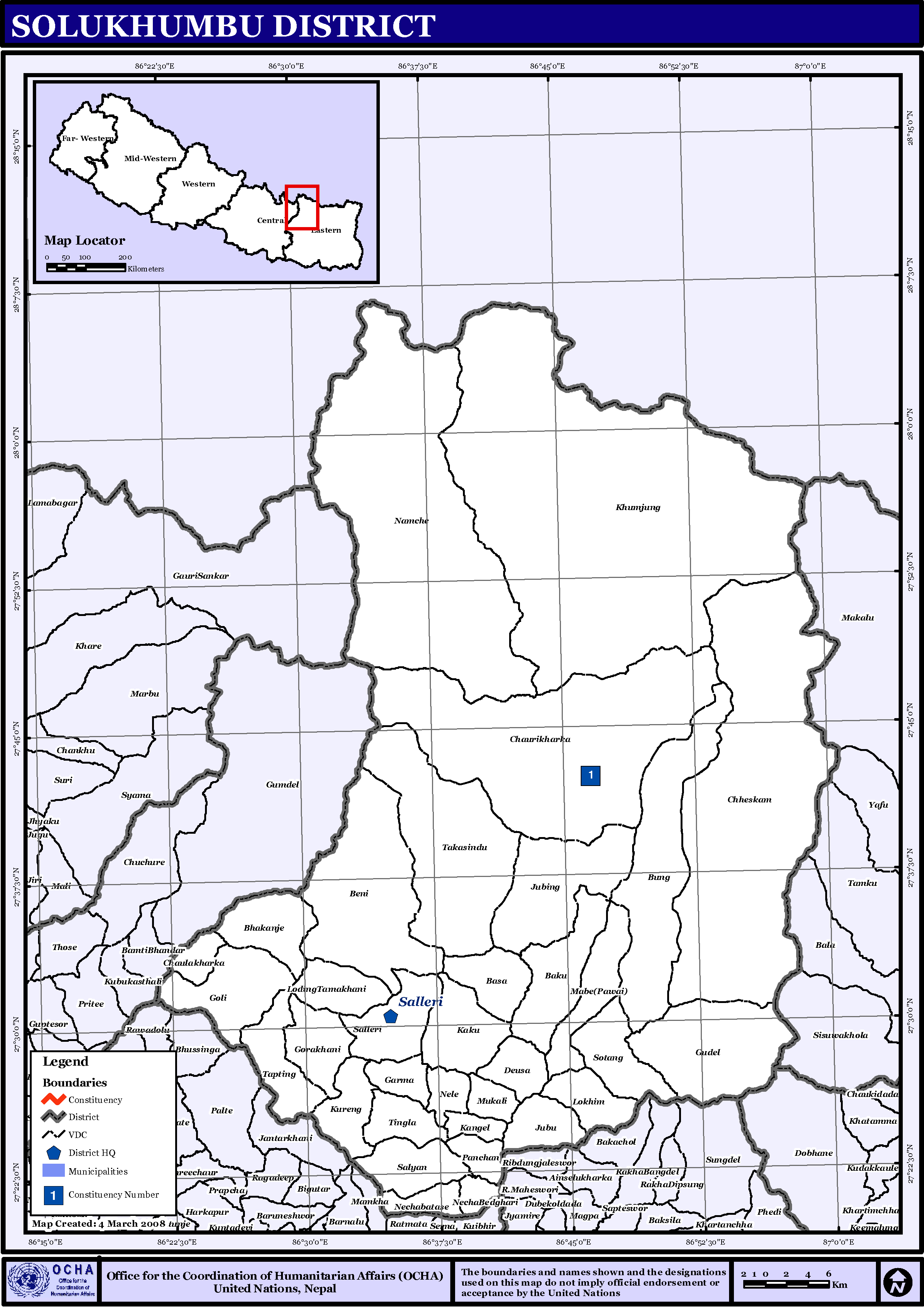
Map of the VDCs in Solukhumbu District

There were 35 Village Development Committees in Solukhumbu District:

- Bapha
- Baku
- Basa
- Beni
- Bhakanje
- Bung
- Chaulakharka
- Chaurikharka
- Chheskam
- Deusa
- Garma
- Goli
- Gorakhani
- Gudel
- Jubing
- Jubu
- Kaku
- Kangel
- Kerung
- Khumjung
- Loding Tamakhani
- Lokhim
- Mabe
- Mukali
- Namche
- Necha Batase
- Necha Bedghari
- Nele
- Panchan
- Salleri
- Salyan
- Sotang
- Takasindu
- Tapting
- Tingla

== Demographics ==
Historical population
Year	Pop.	±% p.a.
1981	88,245	—
1991	97,200	+0.97%
2001	107,686	+1.03%
2011	105,886	−0.17%
2021	104,768	−0.11%

At the 2021 Nepal census, Solukhumbu District had 26319 households and a population of 104,851. 7.94% of the population was under 5 years of age. Solukhumbu had a literacy rate of 77.45% and a sex ratio of 988 females per 1,000 males. 6,744 (6.43%) lived in urban areas.

Ethnicity/caste of Solukhumbu district (2021)
1. Rai (32.8%)
2. Sherpa (17.1%)
3. Chhetri (14.0%)
4. Tamang (10.2%)
5. Kami (5.86%)
6. Magar (5.22%)
7. Bahun (3.89%)
8. Newar (2.45%)
9. Other Hill Janjati (5.28%)
10. Other Khas Dalit (2.29%)
11. Others (0.98%)

Ethnicity/caste: Janjatis make up the majority in the district at 70%. The district has many Rai peoples such as the Kulung, Khaling, Thulung, Nachhiring and Bahing. Sherpas and Tamang people make up the second largest bloc of Janjatis and live mainly in the high mountains. Chhetri are 13%, Bahun 4% and Khas Dalit groups are 8% of the population.

Religion in Solukhumbu District (2021)
Religion	Percent
Hinduism	37.74%
Kirat Mundhum	30.80%
Buddhism	28.31%
Christianity	3.13%
Other or not stated	0.02%

Religion: 40.42% were Hindu, 28.84% Kirati, 26.74% Buddhist, 3.21% Christian, 0.45% Bon and 0.07% others.

Languages of Solukhumbu district (2021)
1. Nepali (34.6%)
2. Sherpa (17.0%)
3. Kulung (10.8%)
4. Tamang (10.1%)
5. Khaling (8.53%)
6. Thulung (8.48%)
7. Nachhiring (3.09%)
8. Bahing (2.09%)
9. Magar Dhut (1.51%)
10. Rai (1.34%)
11. Others (2.48%)

As their first language, 34.65% of the population spoke Nepali, 17.00% Sherpa, 10.77% Kulung, 10.06% Tamang, 8.53% Khaling, 8.48% Thulung, 3.09% Nachhiring, 2.09% Bahing, 1.51% Magar Dhut and 1.34% Rai as their first language. In 2011, 36.7% of the population spoke Nepali as their first language.

== Notable people ==
- Tenzing Norgay- First ascent of Mount Everest
- Pasang Lhamu Sherpa - First Nepalese female ascent
- Babu Chiri Sherpa - 10 times ascent Mount Everest
- Ang Dorje Sherpa - 19 times ascent Mount Everest
- Apa Sherpa - 21 times ascent Mount Everest
- Nawang Sherpa - First person to climb Mount Everest with a prosthetic leg
- Kami Rita Sherpa - A 28th times Everest summiteer on 23 May 2023, breaking his own record set on 17 May 2023.
- Preeti Rai, international footballer

== See also ==
- Zones of Nepal
