= Chheskam =

Chheskam छेस्काम
- Village development committee
- Motto(s): हाम्रो छेस्काम,राम्रो छेस्काम
- Location in Nepal
- Coordinates: 27°31′44″N 86°51′54″E
- Country: Nepal
- Zone: Sagarmatha Zone
- District: Solukhumbu District

Population (1991)
  - Total: 2,824
- Time zone: UTC+5:45 (Nepal Time)

Chheskam is a village development committee in Solukhumbu District in the Sagarmatha Zone of north-eastern Nepal. At the time of the 1991 Nepal census it had a population of 2824 people living in 641 individual households.

It is located in the Hongu valley.
