= Gudel =

Former Village Development Committee in Nepal

Gudel गुदेल
- Village development committee
- Location in Nepal
- Coordinates: 27.48°N 86.88°E
- Country: Nepal
- Zone: Sagarmatha Zone
- District: Solukhumbu District

Population (1991)
  - Total: 3,489
- Time zone: UTC+5:45 (Nepal Time)

Gudel is a village development committee in Solukhumbu District in the Sagarmatha Zone of north-eastern Nepal. At the time of the 1991 Nepal census it had a population of 3,489 in 712 individual households. The people are part of the Kulung culture.

The village is the home of Mauli Dhan who was featured in a set of videos and an article for National Geographic as the ""Last Honey Hunter", the last to maintain the traditional practice of dangerously retrieving hallucinogenic honey from hives on the walls of local cliffs.

Gudel is not well-connected with roads and transport.
