= Panchkhapan Municipality =

Panchkhapan Municipality पाँचखप्पन नगरपालिका
- Municipality
- Location in Koshi Province Panchkhapan Municipality (Nepal)
- Coordinates: 27.33°N 87.30°E
- Country: Nepal
- Province: Koshi
- District: Sankhuwasabha

Government
  - Type: Mayor–council
  - Body: Panchkhapan Municipality
  - Mayor: Bipin Rai (NC)
  - Deputy Mayor: Bhima Devi Rai (NCP)

Area of Municipality
  - Total: 148.03 km^{2} (57.15 sq mi)

Population (2011)
  - Total: 17,521
  - Ethnicities: Tamang Chetri Newar

Languages
  - Local: Nepali, Tamang, Newari
  - Official: Nepali
- Time zone: UTC+5:45 (NST)
- Postal code: 56900
- Website: www.panchkhapanmun.gov.np/

Panchkhapan (Nepali: पाँचखप्पन) is one of the five urban municipalities of Sankhuwasabha District in Koshi Province of Nepal. It lies on 87°12'12" E to 87°26'45" E Longitude and 27°17'37.4" N to 27°24'38" N Latitude. The municipality was established on 3 March 2017 merging former VDCs: Syabun, Jaljala and Wana. The area of the municipality is 148.03KM^{2} and according to 2011 census of Nepal the population of the municipality is 17,521.

The municipality is surrounded by Taplejung District in east, Savapokhari in north, Khandbari in north-west and west and Chainpur in south.

== Demographics ==
At the time of the 2011 Nepal census, Panchkhapan Municipality had a population of 17,521. Of these, 52.5% spoke Nepali, 14.9% Tamang, 7.5% Limbu, 6.9% Yakkha, 6.2% Newar, 3.0% Sherpa, 2.4% Magar, 1.9% Chamling, 1.2% Khaling, 1.1% Rai, 1.0% Gurung, 0.3% Bantawa, 0.2% Maithili, 0.1% Lohorung, 0.1% Nachhiring, 0.1% Sampang, and 0.3% other languages as their first language.

In terms of ethnicity/caste, 19.3% were Tamang, 18.6% Chhetri, 9.5% Newar, 8.4% Limbu, 7.7% Kami, 7.3% Yakkha, 6.9% Rai, 5.3% Hill Brahmin, 4.2% Magar, 3.3% Sanyasi/Dasnami, 3.2% Damai/Dholi, 3.0% Sherpa, 1.1% Gurung, 0.9% Sarki, 0.3% Gharti/Bhujel, 0.2% Thakuri, 0.1% other Dalit, 0.1% Kathabaniyan, 0.1% Kumal and 0.4% others.

In terms of religion, 51.6% were Hindu, 26.9% Buddhist, 21.0% Kirati, 0.4% Christian and 0.1% others.

In terms of literacy, 69.9% could read and write, 2.8% could only read and 27.3% could neither read nor write.
