= Madi Municipality, Sankhuwasabha =

Madi मादी नगरपालिका
- Municipality
- Madi Municipality
- Location in Koshi Province Madi (Nepal)
- Coordinates: 27.16°N 87.24°E
- Country: Nepal
- Province: Koshi
- District: Sankhuwasabha
- Total Wards: 9
- Households: 3216

Government
  - Type: Mayor–council
  - Body: Madi Municipality
  - Mayor: Jiban Lingthep, CPN(UML)
  - Deputy Mayor: Sunita Devi Bhattarai, CPN(UML)

Area of Municipality
  - Total: 110.10 km^{2} (42.51 sq mi)
- Highest elevation: 2,900 m (9,500 ft)
- Lowest elevation: 500 m (1,600 ft)

Population (2011)
  - Total: 14,470

Languages
  - Official: Nepali
- Time zone: UTC+5:45 (NST)
- Website: www.madimun.gov.np/

Madi (Nepali: मादी) is a municipality in Sankhuwasabha District of Koshi Province in Nepal. It is one of five municipalities in the district. The total area of the municipality is 110.10 km (68.41 mi) and according to 2011 census of Nepal, the population is 14,470. The municipality was established in March 2017 merging some former VDCs: e.g. Madi Mulkharka, Madi Rambeni and Mawadin. The municipality is divided into 13 wards. The headquarter of the municipality is in Okharbote.

The municipality is surrounded by Terhathum District in east, Chainpur Municipality in the west and north, and Dharmadevi Municipality in south.

== Demographics ==
At the time of the 2011 Nepal census, Madi Municipality had a population of 14,473. Of these, 54.7% spoke Nepali, 10.2% Tamang, 9.5% Limbu, 7.5% Gurung, 6.3% Yakkha, 4.3% Sherpa, 1.6% Newar, 1.3% Rai, 0.9% Bhujel, 0.7% Bantawa, 0.6% Chamling, 0.5% Khaling, 0.3% Maithili, 0.2% Kulung, 0.2% Sampang, 0.2% Thulung, 0.1% Magar, 0.1% Yamphu and 0.7% other languages as their first language.

In terms of ethnicity/caste, 24.7% were Chhetri, 12.9% Hill Brahmin, 10.9% Tamang, 9.6% Limbu, 8.2% Gurung, 6.9% Yakkha, 4.7% Kami, 4.7% Sherpa, 3.6% Rai, 3.4% Damai/Dholi, 3.0% Gharti/Bhujel, 2.7% Sarki, 2.1% Newar, 0.4% Khaling, 0.4% Magar, 0.3% Badi, 0.3% Thulung, 0.2% Chamling, 0.1% Bantawa, 0.1% Hajjam/Thakur, 0.1% Mali, 0.1% Samgpang, 0.1% Sanyasi/Dasnami, 0.1% Yamphu and 0.3% others.

In terms of religion, 54.7% were Hindu, 24.1% Buddhist, 20.3% Kirati, 0.6% Christian, 0.1% Prakriti and 0.2% others.

In terms of literacy, 71.2% could read and write, 2.2% could only read and 26.6% could neither read nor write.
