= Pathibhara, Sankhuwasabha =

Pathibhara, Hedangnagadhi पाथीभरा, हेदाङनगढी
- Proposed village development committee
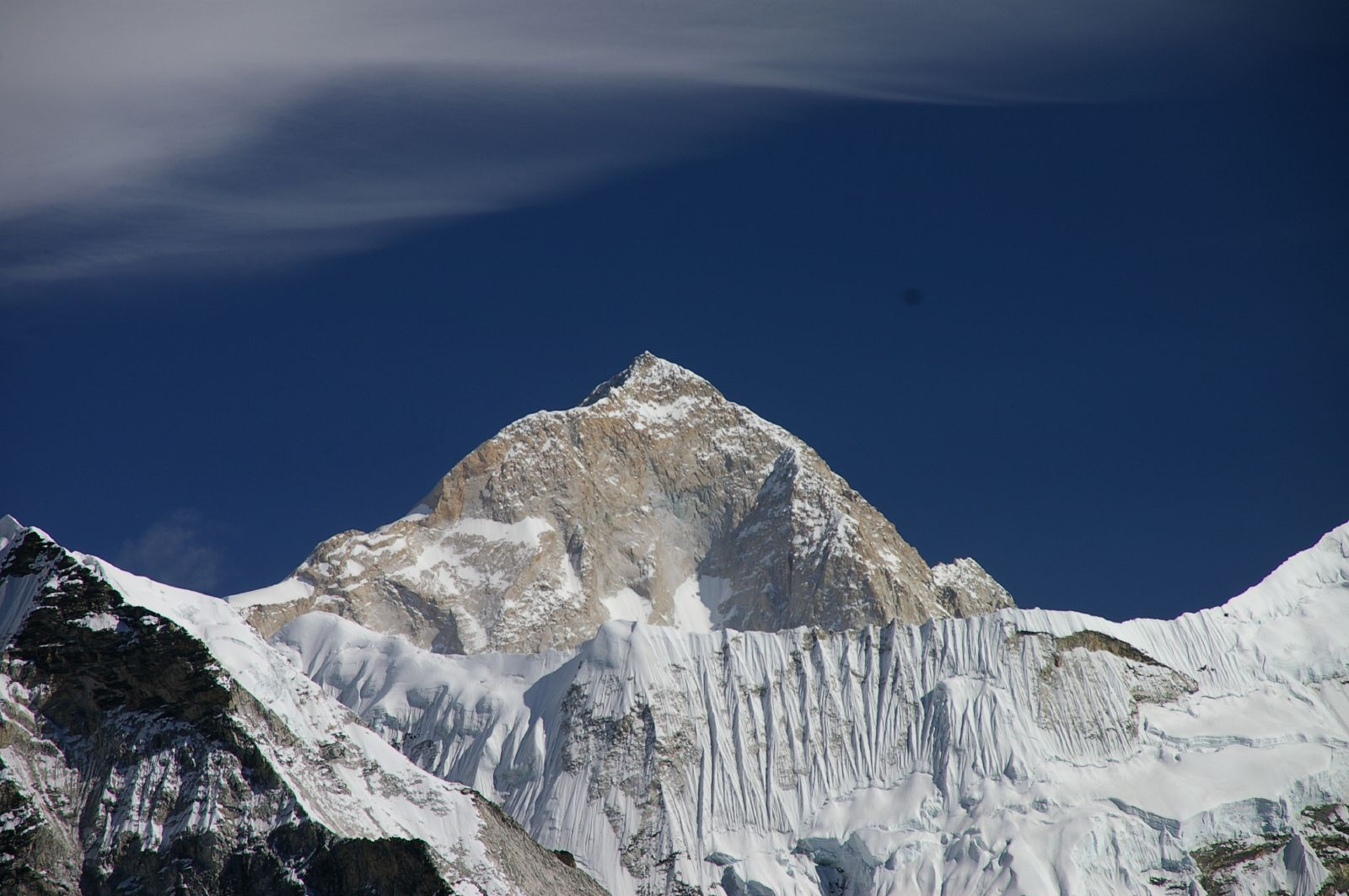
- Makalu

- Location in Nepal
- Coordinates: 27.61°N 87.32°E
- Country: Nepal
- Zone: Kosi Zone
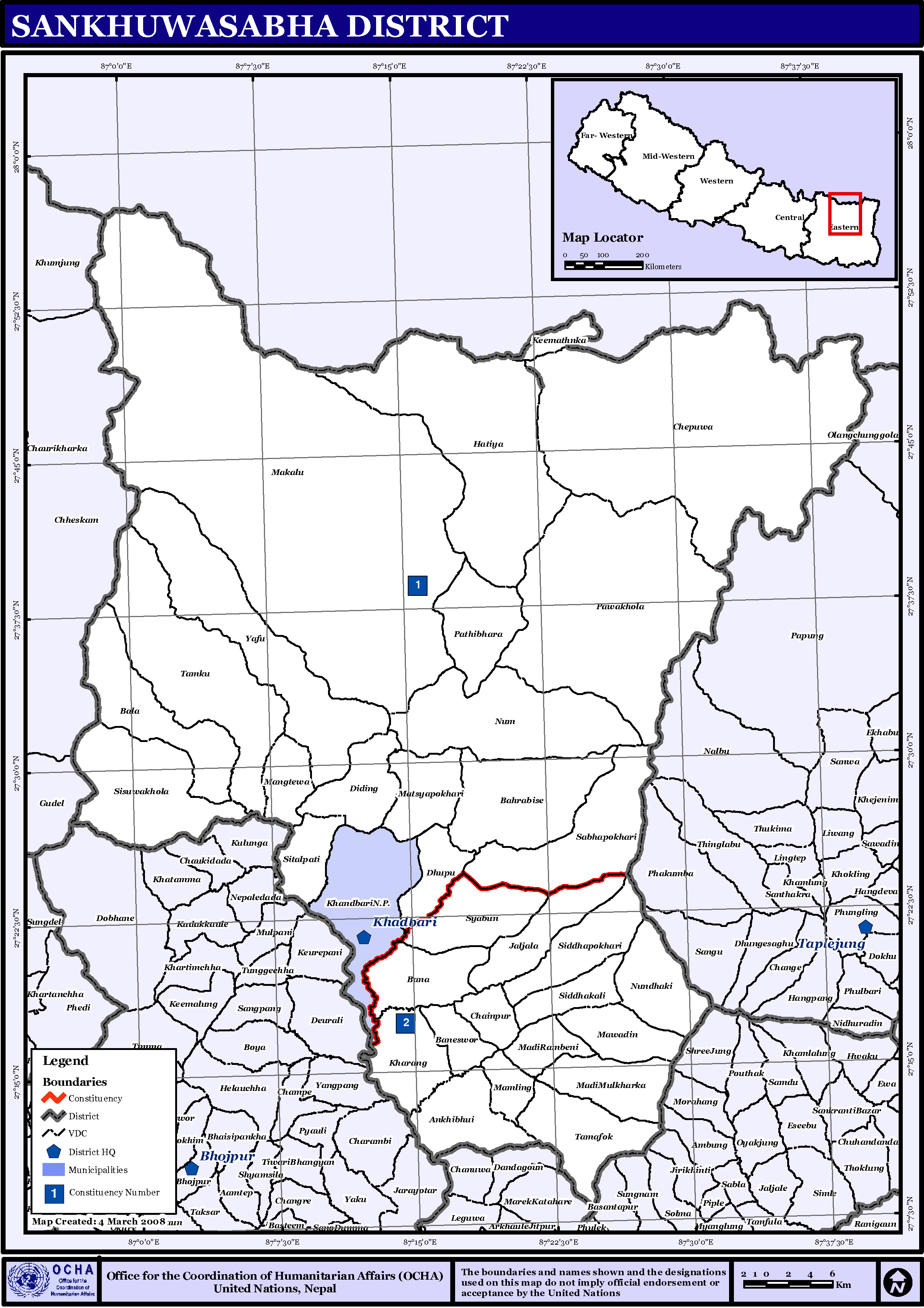
- District: Sankhuwasabha District Map of the VDCs in Sankhuwasabha District

Population (3253)
  - Total: 3,253
- Time zone: UTC+5:45 (Nepal Time)

Pathibhara, Hedangnagadhi is a Proposed Makalu / barun Kimathanka village development committee in Sankhuwasabha District in the Kosi Zone of north-eastern Nepal. At the time of the 2011 Nepal census it had a population of 3253 people living in 607 individual households. The population are predominantly of indigenous descent.

== Geography ==
Pathibhara is located in the Himalayas in the northeast of the country. Pathibhara borders Pawakhola to the east, Num to the south, Makalu to the west and Hatiya to the north. It lies in proximity to Makalu (8,485 m), the world's fifth highest peak. It is located near the Makalu Barun National Park. The area has an abundance of flora and fauna, with the landscape ranging from Alpine grassland, to subtropical forests.

== Education ==
In 2011, there were reportedly 1738 people attending school, 1023 were male, 715 were female. In total there were 409 children not attending school. In total, 2646 out of the population of 3253 were literate, 1428 were male and 873 female. However 345 people could read only and not write.
