= Manakamana Temple (Sankhuwasabha) =

Manakamana temple
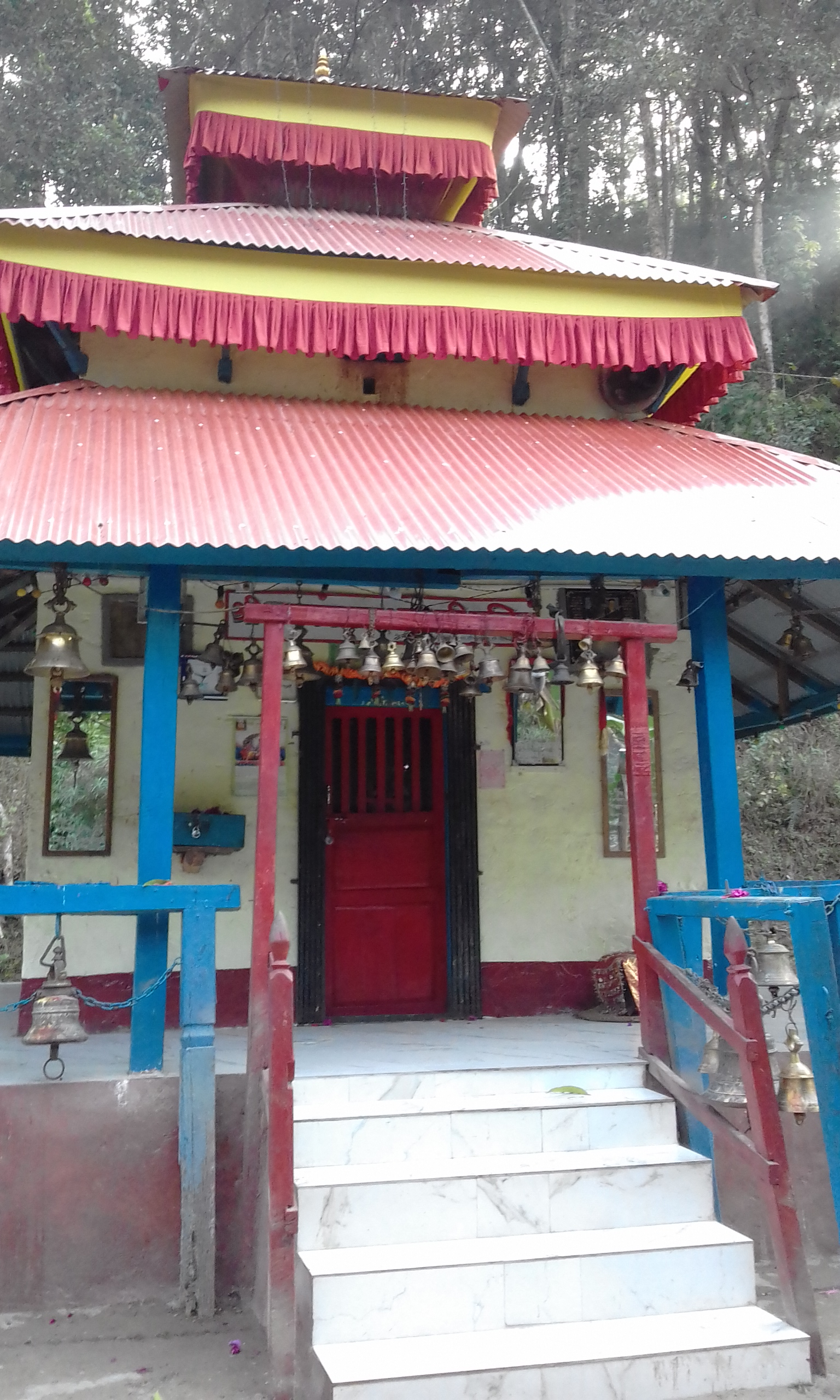
- Front view of Manakamana Temple

- Location within Nepal

Religion
- Affiliation: Hinduism
- District: Sankhuwasabha

Location
- Location: Khandbari, Sankhuwasabha
- State: Koshi
- Country: Nepal
- Interactive map of Manakamana temple
- Coordinates: 27.3396°N 87.1889°E

Architecture
- Type: Pagoda

Manakamana temple is the most famous temple situated in Tumlingtar about 5 Kilometers north of Tumlingtar Airport. It is in the north east of Tumlingtar bazaar on a bank of the Arun River. It is said that it was taken there from Manakamana of Gorkha. About a hundred old people live at the temple, and pray to God for their salvation after death. Every year thousands of people come to worship the Goddess and for fasting in November (on the eleventh after the New Moon of Kartik).

The temple is in the pagoda style. The fair held in November is popular for singing, dancing and fasting.

The origin of the temple is explained in Nepalese folklore through the story of Manakamana Devi. It is believed that in the 1600s, the Queen of Gorkha had god-like powers and when the King, her husband, discovered this, he immediately perished. Following the customs of the time, the Queen committed Sati (self-immolation over her husband's funeral pyre), but before doing so, she informed her devotee Lakhan Thapa that she would come back and reveal herself to him. Soon after her death, as a farmer was plowing his field he discovered a stone that oozed milk and blood. Word of the miracle reached Lakhan Thapa and he interpreted it as the return of the Queen. Lakhan Thapa built the Manakamana Temple in the location that the magical stone was found.
