= Tumlingtar =

Coordinates: 27°18′N 87°12′E

Tumlingtar तुम्लिङटार
- Town
- Interactive map of Tumlingtar
- Country: Nepal
- Province: Province No. 1
- District: Sankhuwasabha
- Municipality: Khandbari Municipality

Area
  - Total: 8.5 km^{2} (3.3 sq mi)

Kumal, Chettri, Braman, Majhi, Newar, Rai, Tamang,
- Time zone: UTC+5:45 (Nepal Standard Time)
- Ethnic groups: Kumal, Tamang, Sherpa, Bahun, Limbu

Tumlingtar (Nepali: तुम्लिङटार) is a region and a town, in Sankhuwasabha district of Province No. 1 of Eastern Nepal, between the Arun and Sabha rivers. It is located in Sankhuwasabha District. It is also the deepest valley of the world and largest ṭār (butte or mesa) of Nepal. The total area of Tumlingtar is 8.5 sq.km. It is ethinically diverse place.

== Demographics ==
The indigenous tribe of Tumlingtar is Kumal . Their traditional profession is pot-making, though only a few still practise this career nowadays. The other tribes living there are Bahun, Chhetri, Magar, Rai, Tamang, Newar and Majhi. The inhabitants have shown racial harmony. The people of any tribe are always helpful to the rest in the rituals. The total number of families in Tumlingtar is about 600.

== Transport ==
As urbanisation has been growing here, many people of the surrounding areas are drawn to the city nowadays. This is the southernmost point from which the bus regularly goes to the district headquarters. You can reach Tumlingtar by airways or roadways. It will take around 5–6 hours while traveling from some bigger cities like; Biratnagar, Itahari & Dharan. Being located in the Himalayan region, most of the city is offroads, whereas Koshi highway draw a black pitch road from the heart of the city.

Planes regularly fly from Tumlingtar Airport to Biratnagar and Kathmandu. Currently, the airlines operating flights from Tumlingtar are Buddha Air and Yeti Airlines. Tumlingtar is the primary gateway airport for reaching Makalu, the peak being roughly 50 km to the north of the city, with the base camp being accessible by trekking routes.

== Local infrastructure ==
There are some smaller hotels in Tumlingtar, but they generally do not have the facilities required to meet international standards. The city has two schools. The Manakamana Higher Secondary School is the largest public school, Golden Stars English school is only private school of Tumlingtar.

Nepal Electricity Authority (NEA) have recently established the central office of the district. The Health Post with the capacity more than 100 beds is also available. There are two private hospital in the region, Manakamana Hospital & Harisiddhi Hospital.

There are numerous hotels which provide accommodation facility for night stay or foods. Some of them are:

- Shrestha Hotel
- Narayan Katuwal Hotel
- Hotel Buddha
- Kanchanjunga Hotel
- New Manakamana Hotel & Lodge
- Makalu Adventure & Makalu Resort

There are many grocery stores around Tumlingtar. Some of them are:

- Utsab & Saurabi store
- Dhanalaxmi Mart

== Environment ==
Tumlingtar was once a site of concern of the Nepalese because of the Arun III hydro-electric project. After Arun III established its head office for a large 900 MW project, this valley has become a centre of attraction for rest of the country. Arun III has the only gateway which is through Tumlingtar. It has a moderate temperature where during the summer the maximum temperature is 35 °C and in winter it can drop to 12 °C. The average temperature throughout the year is 28 °C.

== Religious places ==
The area is also known for the temple of the Hindu goddess Manakamana, known as Manakamana of Tumlingtar, situated 2.5 km north of the Tumlingtar Airport. Radha-Krishna Temple is also at the middle of Tumlingtar bazar, where people have a lot of faith in, people visit temples especially in cultural and ritual festivals.

dharma devi temple humbung 6 tumlingtar situated 30 km south .ankhubhuin Sankhuwasabha

== See also ==
- Arun Valley
