= Koshi Highway =

Road in Nepal

Koshi Highway कोशी राजमार्ग
- राष्ट्रिय राजमार्ग ०८
- National Highway 08
- Koshi Highway in red
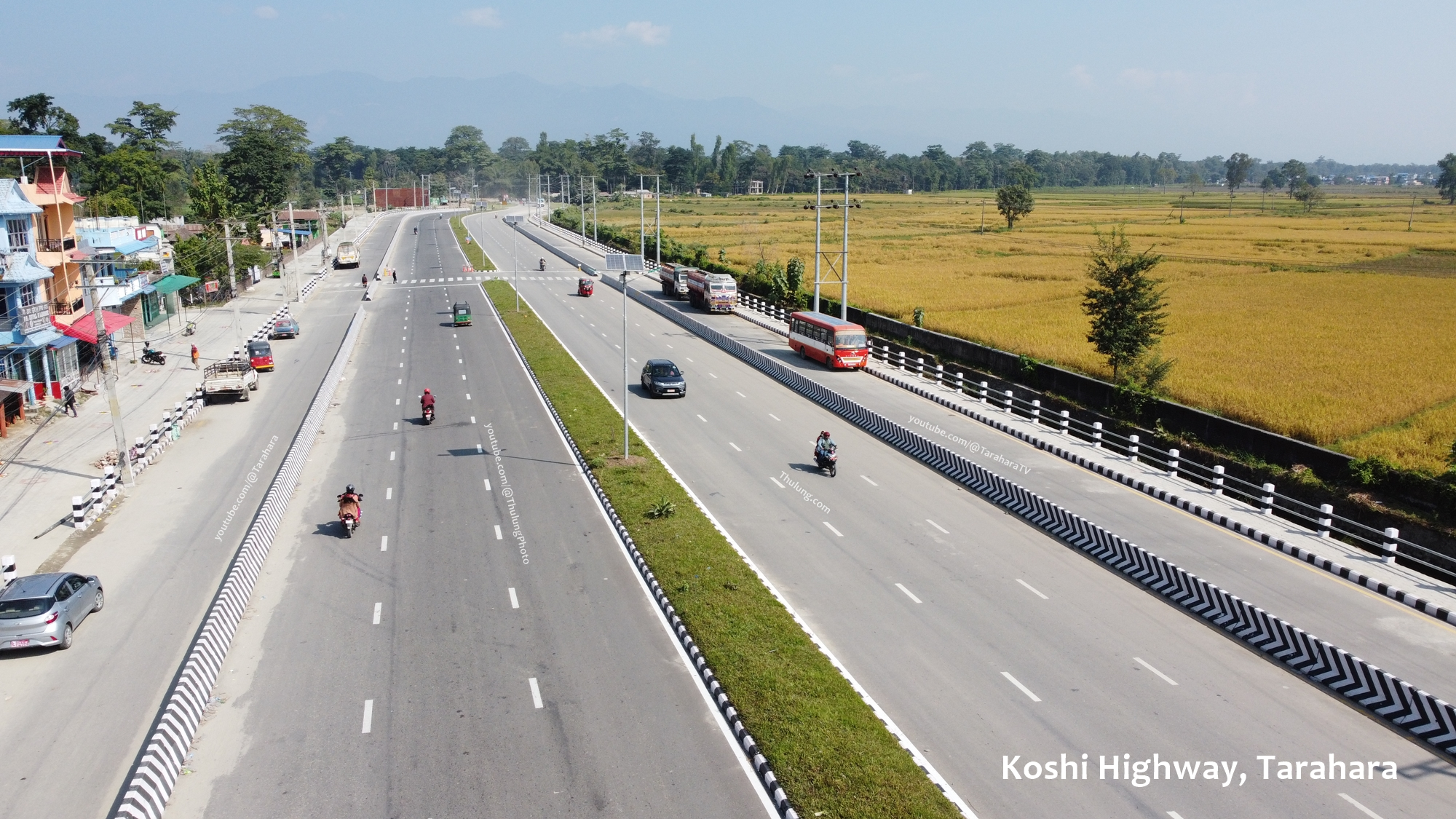
- Koshi Highway, Tarahara Eastern Nepal

Route information
- Maintained by MoPIT (Department of Roads)
- Length: 390 km (240 mi)

Major junctions
- South end: Rani, Biratnagar
- NH 527 Jogbani, India NH05 at Biratnagar; NH01 at Itahari; NH09 at Dharan; NH06 at Mulghat; NH03 at Hile, Leguwa; NH10 at Bohoratar S514 at Chentang, China
- North end: Kimathanka, Sankhuwasabha

Location
- Country: Nepal
- Regions: Terai, Hill, Mountain
- Provinces: Koshi Province
- Districts: Morang, Sunsari, Dhankuta, Sankhuwasabha
- Primary destinations: Biratnagar, Itahari, Tarahara, Dharan, Bhedetar, Dhankuta, Hile, Khandbari, Num, Kimathanka

Highway system
- Roads in Nepal
← NH07	→ NH09

Koshi Highway or NH08 (previously: H08) (Nepali: कोशी राजमार्ग) is a 390 km long highway located in Koshi Province. It is a north-south highway which is understood to be the shortest highway connecting India to China across the Himalayan mountains in Nepal. Rani at Biratnagar is the starting point of the road which is connected to Jogbani in India and Kimathanka is the end point of the Koshi Highway, which is connected to Chinese town Chentang.

With the exception of 14 km of the track (Chyamptang-Ghongghoppa section of the road), the highway track had been open to traffic in 2021. The work was awarded to Nepal Army to open the remaining track. On 27 January 2025 the remaining track (Chyamptang-Ghongghoppa section of the road) was completed by the Nepal Army and the road from Indian border Jogbani to Chinese border Chentang is completely connected though road is not yet operational, as bridges on the rivers are not completed. though southern section of the Koshi Highway is not blacktopped yet.

Koshi is one of the major and older highways of Nepal.

== Sections ==
- Rani-Dharan section: Rani near the Indo-Nepal border to Dharan is a 49 km route which is being upgraded into six lanes. 42.5 km out of the 49 kilometers have made significant progress. The construction on a five-kilometer stretch of the six-lane road in Dharan, however, is still remaining.
- Dharan-Dhankuta section: This a two lane 75 km of road located on hills made in hairpin style. The road was started to be built in the 1970s with a grant provided by the United Kingdom. It was constructed by the Italian consultants' team and the road was finally completed in 1982.
- Dhankuta-Khandbari section is divided into two parts. The first part is 18 km from Dhankuta to Hile. Hile is a hilltown where the Koshi Highway meets with National Highway 03 (Pushpalal Highway) and terminates. The second part starts at Leguwa extracting from NH-03 and runs continuously north to Khandbari which is 50 km at distance so the total distance of Dhankuta-Khandbari section is 68 km. The section is two-lane and paved (asphalt). The road from Hile to Leguwa (26 km) is a part of NH-03.
- Khandbari-Kimathanka section: According to the North-South Koshi Road Project office the length between Khandbari to Kimathanka is 158 km. The track on this part of the highway has recently opened so the road is not paved yet.

== See also ==
- Roads in Nepal
