= Bhotkhola Rural Municipality =

Bhotkhola भोटखोला गाउँपालिका
- Rural Municipality
- Location in Koshi Province Bhotkhola (Nepal)
- Coordinates: 27.76°N 87.33°E
- Province: Koshi Province
- District: Sankhuwasabha
- Wards: 5
- Established: 10 March 2017

Government
  - Type: Rural Council
  - Chairperson: Mr. Wang Chhedar Lama (UML)
  - Vice-chairperson: Mrs. Sahana Lama (UML)

Area
  - Total: 639.01 km^{2} (246.72 sq mi)

Population (2021)
  - Total: 7,318
  - Density: 11.45/km^{2} (29.66/sq mi)
- Time zone: UTC+5:45 (Nepal Standard Time)
- Headquarter: Hatiya
- Website: official website

Bhotkhola (Nepali: भोटखोला गाउँपालिका) is a rural municipality (gaunpalika) out of five rural municipality located in Sankhuwasabha District of Koshi Province of Nepal. There are a total of 10 municipalities in Sankhuwasabha in which 5 are urban and 5 are rural.

According to Ministry of Federal Affairs and Local Development Bhotkhola has an area of 639.01 square kilometres (246.72 mi^{2}) and the total population of the municipality is 7318 as of Census of Nepal 2021.

Kimathanka, Chepuwa, Hatiya and part of Pawakhola which previously were all separate Village development committee merged to form this new local level body. Fulfilling the requirement of the new Constitution of Nepal 2015, Ministry of Federal Affairs and Local Development replaced all old VDCs and Municipalities into 753 new local level body (Municipality).

The rural municipality is divided into total 5 wards and the headquarter of this newly formed rural municipality is situated in Hatiya.

== Demographics ==
At the time of the 2021 Nepal census, Bhotkhola Rural Municipality had a population of 7318. Of these, 55.8% spoke Sherpa, 10.4% Nepali, 9.4% Tamang, 8.7% Lhomi, 4.5% Khaling, 2.8% Yamphu, 2.0% Rai, 1.4% Kulung, 1.0% Belhare, 0.8% Chamling, 0.7% Bahing, 0.7% Gurung, 0.5% Thulung, 0.4% Newar and 0.6% other languages as their first language.

In terms of ethnicity/caste, 48.5% were Bhote, 16.7% Rai, 12.9% Lhomi, 9.5% Tamang, 6.1% Sherpa, 2.9% Gurung, 1.3% Kami, 0.8% Newar, 0.5% Chhetri, 0.3% Kulung, 0.2% Hill Brahmin and 0.5% others.

In terms of religion, 78.7% were Buddhist, 16.8% Kirati, 3.0% Hindu, 1.4% Christian and 0.1% others.

In terms of literacy, 47.5% could read and write, 3.6% could only read and 48.9% could neither read nor write.
