= Kimathanka =

Kimathanka किमाथांका
- Village (ward)
- Kimathanka Kimathanka Map of the village development committees in Sankhuwasabha District
- Location in province Kimathanka (Nepal)
- Coordinates: 27.8569°N 87.4181°E
- Country: Nepal
- Province: Province No. 1
- District: Sankhuwasabha
- Rural Municipality: Bhotkhola
- Part of (ward): Ward no. 1

Area
  - Total: 13.37 km^{2} (5.16 sq mi)

Population (2011)
  - Total: 368
  - Density: 27.5/km^{2} (71.3/sq mi)
- Time zone: UTC+5:45 (Nepal Time)

Kimathanka is a village (previously, a village development committee) in Bhotkhola rural municipality of Sankhuwasabha District of Koshi Province, Nepal and serves as the Nepalese counterpart of the Nepal-China (Tibet autonomous region) border at Zhentang (Chentang). At the time of the 1991 census, it had a population of 303 people living in 50 individual households.

Being among the most remote Himalayan villages of Nepal, Kimathanka is also the end point of the in-progress 362 kilometers long Biratnagar-Khandbari-Kimathanka road called Koshi Highway, which plans to connect the village with the provincial headquarter of Biratnagar and subsequently, with the Indian border town of Jogbani. The Arun River runs through the valley below the village. In 2019, road embankment construction on the Chinese side led to fear of potential downstream flooding in Kimathanka. In November 2020, Prime Minister of Nepal KP Sharma Oli visited Kimathanka inspecting the progress of Koshi Highway and other infrastructure projects in the area.

== Border ==
Kimathanka is near the border with Tibet. The border was part of brief dispute between China and Nepal before 1960. The dispute was resolved in their 1961 border agreement. The Chentang township in Tibet is on the other side of the valley. There has been local cross-border trade for decades. It has been sufficiently crucial for the local economy in recent years that in 2008 when Chinese tightened its border control during the Olympics, Kimathanka and the nearby villages faced food shortages due to disruption of the local trade. A Chinese border checkpoint was set up in 2011 checking border crossing permits of Nepalese. In 2015, there were recorded 7700 border crossings and the annual trade at this port was valued at CN¥ 18,650,000.

== Culture ==
Kimathanka was one of the areas of Nepal that had traditionally practiced polyandry, however that practice is fading.
