= Hatiya =

Hatiya may refer to:

- Hatiya Upazila an administrative region in Bangladesh
  - Hatiya Island, a part of Hatiya Upazila
- Hatiya, Baglung, a village in Dhaulagiri Zone, Nepal
- Hatiya, Sankhuwasabha, a village in Kosi Zone, Nepal
- Hatiya, Makwanpur, a village in Narayani Zone, Nepal

== See also ==
- Hatia
