= Sekaha =

Sekaha सेकहा, खाँदबारी नगरपालिका - ५
- Municipality
- Location in Nepal
- Coordinates: 27.23°N 87.12°E
- Country: Nepal
- Province: Province No. 1
- District: Sankhuwasabha District
- Time zone: UTC+5:45 (Nepal Time)

Sekaha is a small village in Khandbari Municipality Ward No. 5 of Sankhuwasabha District of Eastern Nepal.
