= Madi Municipality =

Madi Municipality may refer to:

- Madi, Chitwan, a municipality in Chitwan District, Bagmati Province of Nepal
- Madi, Sankhuwasabha, a municipality in Sankhuwasabha District, Province No. 1 of Nepal
