= Pangma =

Pangma पाङमा
- Village development committee
- Country: Nepal
- Zone: Kosi Zone
- District: Sankhuwasabha District

Population (1991)
  - Total: 5,857
- Time zone: UTC+5:45 (Nepal Time)

Pangma [पाङमा/^{pɑ}ːᵑ^{mɑ}ː/] was once a village development committee and now is the fourth Khandbari Municipality Ward, in the Sankhuwasabha District, Kosi Zone, in eastern Nepal. There are four Pangmas namely, Gaireepangma (also known as Maaganwa or Masapten) the main Pangma, other Pangmas are in the west are Danda Pangma, Loke pangma and Yangkhrung Pangma. The village, having 90 percent of Lohorung Rais, speak Lohorung (their own mother tongue). Besides Lohorung, other caste includes Bramhan, Chhetri, Biswakarma, Kafley, Sarki and Damai. At the time of the 1991 Nepal census it had a population of 5857 people living in 1202 individual households. The Northern part of Pangma is Sekaha or Sekha (सेकाहा, सेखा), mostly Gurung community (Ghondey or these days they also write Ghotane and Lamichhane), to the east is Malta, divided by the river Pangma khola or to the west is Shitalpati separated by Dhandebhir (ढँडे भीर) and Manebhanjyang in the south. The etiology of the word root "Pangma" comes from the word "Pa" means papa or father and "Ma" means mother to PaMa combined and gradually modified to Pangma. The people from Pangma are known as "Pangmali" (पाङमाली)and thought to be very brave and energetic are also the warrior group. So they are also known as "kancho" (means very brave and attacking) or "Pangmali kancho" referring to the person who does not fear of anything, to fight or for heavier physical work. This village has now three Primary schools, Sree Mangala Devi Prathamik Vidhayalay established in 1887 (2044BS) at Gaireepangma, Sishu Syahar Kendra at Danda Pangma and another at Syamdamgaun at Lokepangma.

== List of Pangma villages ==
- Loke Pangma
- Gairi Pangma
- Danda Pangma
