= Silichong Rural Municipality =

Silichong सिलिचोंग गाउँपालिका
- Rural Municipality
- Province: Koshi Province
- District: Sankhuwasabha
- Wards: 5
- Established: 10 March 2017

Government
  - Type: Rural Council
  - Chairperson: Mr. Bhupal Raj Rai (NC)
  - Vice-chairperson: Mrs. Devita Rai(Kulung]] (NC)

Area
  - Total: 293.26 km^{2} (113.23 sq mi)

Population (2011)
  - Total: 12,174
  - Density: 41.513/km^{2} (107.52/sq mi)
- Time zone: UTC+5:45 (Nepal Standard Time)
- Headquarter: Tamku
- Website: official website

Silichong (Nepali: सिलीचोङ गाउँपालिका) is a rural municipality (gaunpalika) out of five rural municipality located in Sankhuwasabha District of Koshi Province of Nepal. There are a total of 10 municipalities in Sankhuwasabha in which 5 are urban and 5 are rural.

According to Ministry of Federal Affairs and Local Development Silichong has an area of 293.26 square kilometres (113.23 mi^{2}) and the total population of the municipality is 12174 as of Census of Nepal 2011.

Sisuwakhola, Bala, Tamku, Mantewa and part of Yafu which previously were all separate Village development committee merged to form this new local level body. Fulfilling the requirement of the new Constitution of Nepal 2015, Ministry of Federal Affairs and Local Development replaced all old VDCs and Municipalities into 753 new local level body (Municipality).

The rural municipality is divided into total 5 wards and the headquarter of this newly formed rural municipality is situated in Tamku.

== Demographics ==
At the time of the 2011 Nepal census, Silichong Rural Municipality had a population of 11,812. Of these, 65.2% spoke Kulung, 16.0% Mewahang, 6.3% Nepali, 2.7% Rai, 1.9% Tamang, 1.6% Nachhiring, 1.5% Sherpa, 1.3% Maithili, 1.3% Sindhi, 0.7% Thulung, 0.3% Khaling, 0.3% Sampang, 0.2% Chamling, 0.2% Limbu, 0.1% Bantawa, 0.1% Dumi and 0.2% other languages as their first language.

In terms of ethnicity/caste, 66.3% were Kulung, 13.7% Mewahang Bala, 6.6% Rai, 2.4% Kami, 2.2% Bhote, 1.9% Chhetri, 1.9% Tamang, 1.5% Sherpa, 1.3% Nachhiring, 1.1% Kayastha, 0.7% Thulung, 0.5% Khaling, 0.3% Damai/Dholi, 0.3% Samgpang, 0.2% Chamling, 0.2% Limbu, 0.1% Hill Brahmin, 0.1% Newar, 0.1% Sanyasi/Dasnami, and 0.4% others.

In terms of religion, 85.9% were Kirati, 7.0% Hindu, 3.5% Christian, 3.4% Buddhist and 0.1% others.

In terms of literacy, 70.0% could read and write, 2.8% could only read and 27.1% could neither read nor write.
