= Loke Pangma =

Loke Pangma लोके पाङ्मा, खाँदबारी नगरपालिका - ४
- Municipality
- Location in Nepal
- Coordinates: 27.23°N 87.12°E
- Country: Nepal
- Province: Province No. 1
- District: Sankhuwasabha District
- Time zone: UTC+5:45 (Nepal Time)

Loke Pangma is a small village within Pangma in Khandbari Municipality Ward No. 4 of Sankhuwasabha District of eastern Nepal.
