= Dharmadevi Municipality =

Dharmadevi धर्मदेवी
- Municipality
- Dharmadevi Municipality
- Location in Koshi Province Dharmadevi (Nepal)
- Coordinates: 27.19°N 87.34°E
- Country: Nepal
- Province: Koshi
- District: Sankhuwasabha
- Total Wards: 9

Government
  - Type: Mayor–council
  - Body: Dharmadevi Municipality
  - Mayor: Mr. Uday Chandra Poudel (CPN-UML)
  - Deputy Mayor: Mrs. Tara Mahat Bhattarai (NC)
  - Chief Executive Officer: Mr. Prayash Bhattarai

Area of Municipality
  - Total: 133 km^{2} (51 sq mi)

Population (2011)
  - Total: 18,235

Languages
  - Official: Nepali
- Time zone: UTC+5:45 (NST)
- Website: www.dharmadevimun.gov.np/

Dharmadevi (Nepali: धर्मदेवी) is a municipality in Sankhuwasabha District of Koshi Province in Nepal. It is one if five municipalities in the district. The total area of the municipality is 133 km (83 mi) and according to the 2011 census of Nepal, the population of this municipality is 18,235. The municipality was established in March 2017, merging some former VDCs: e.g. Aankhibhui, Mamling and Tamaphok. The municipality is divided into 9 wards. The headquarter of the municipality is in Tamaphok.

== Demographics ==
At the time of the 2011 Nepal census, Dharmadevi Municipality had a population of 18,235. Of these, 58.7% spoke Nepali, 20.0% Yakkha, 6.1% Tamang, 6.0% Magar, 3.7% Gurung, 1.8% Sherpa, 0.8% Limbu, 0.8% Rai, 0.6% Newar, 0.3% Nachhiring, 0.2% Bantawa, 0.2% Chamling, 0.2% Maithili, 0.1% Sunwar and 0.5% other languages as their first language.

In terms of ethnicity/caste, 39.1% were Chhetri, 20.8% Yakkha, 6.4% Magar, 6.4% Tamang, 6.1% Gurung, 4.2% Newar, 3.5% Kami, 2.9% Hill Brahmin, 2.6% Damai/Dholi, 2.1% Rai, 1.8% Sarki, 1.8% Sherpa, 0.9% Limbu, 0.4% Gharti/Bhujel, 0.4% Sanyasi/Dasnami, 0.2% Sunuwar, 0.1% Tharu and 0.4% others.

In terms of religion, 57.3% were Hindu, 22.4% Kirati, 19.0% Buddhist, 1.2% Christian, 0.1% Muslim and 0.1% others.

In terms of literacy, 71.2% could read and write, 2.4% could only read and 25.8% could neither read nor write.
