= Gairi Pangma =

Gairi Pangma गैरी पाङमा Magawa
- city
- Nickname: Masapten
- Country: Nepal
- Province: Province No. 1
- District: Sankhuwasabha District
- Time zone: UTC+5:45 (Nepal Time)
- Area code: +977 29

Gairi Pangma (गैरी पाङमा) is a small village within Pangma in Khandbari, Municipality Ward No. 4 of Sankhuwasabha District, Province No. 1 of eastern Nepal. The village is also known as "Magawa" or "Masapten". The names comes from the Lohorung language "Ma" means Mother or "Gawa" means village ('Mul gaun' means main village of Pangma). The population in this village are Kirat Lohorung and accounts ninety-nine percent. The different sub-caste of living in this village are Lamsong, Biwa, Dekhim, Yumpang, Helluwali, Yangkhrung and Biksik. The minor people live are Sarki, Brahmin especially Pokharel and some Damais. These are very brave and honest people, who mostly join Gurkhas.

The geographical location of Gairi Pangma is Malta in the east, Dada Pangma in the west, Sekaha in the North and Manebhanjyang in the south.

There is a nice view point near the village. The viewpoint is called "Fokte Chautara". In this romantic place, people gather for romance and dating, mostly at night. The night Dating is called "Vaka" in the local language.

It has a primary School name Sri Mangala Devi Prathamik Vidhyalaya, established in 1988. It has a viewpoint called Chulidada (loving view), with a 360 degree view of Khandbari Municipality, Tumlingtar Airport, Dingla (Bhojpur), some parts of Dhankutta and Arun Valley which is the lowest valley in the world.
