= Jaljala =

Jajala may refer to:

- Jaljala Rural Municipality
- Jaljala, Baglung
- Jaljala, Sankhuwasabha
