= Siddhakali =

Siddhakali सिद्धकाली
- Location in Nepal
- Coordinates: 27.31°N 87.40°E
- Country: Nepal
- Zone: Kosi Zone
- District: Sankhuwasabha District

Population (1991)
  - Total: 4,743
- Time zone: UTC+5:45 (Nepal Time)
- Postal code: 56908
- Area code: 029

Siddhakali is market center in Chainpur Municipality in Sankhuwasabha District in the Kosi Zone of north-eastern Nepal. At the time of the 1991 Nepal census it had a population of 4743 people living in 880 individual households.
