= Chichila Rural Municipality =

Rural municipality in Koshi Province, Nepal

Chichila (Nepali: चिचिला गाउँपालिका) is a rural municipality (gaunpalika) out of five rural municipality located in Sankhuwasabha District of Koshi Province of Nepal. There are a total of 10 municipalities in Sankhuwasabha in which 5 are urban and 5 are rural.

According to Ministry of Federal Affairs and Local Development Chichila has an area of 88.63 square kilometres (34.22 mi^{2}) and the total population of the municipality is 7065 as of Census of Nepal 2011.

Diding and Matsyapokhari which previously were all separate Village development committee merged to form this new local level body. Fulfilling the requirement of the new Constitution of Nepal 2015, Ministry of Federal Affairs and Local Development replaced all old VDCs and Municipalities into 753 new local level body (Municipality).

The rural municipality is divided into total 5 wards and the headquarter of this newly formed rural municipality is situated in Diding.

== Demographics ==
At the time of the 2011 Nepal census, Chichila Rural Municipality had a population of 7,065. Of these, 29.5% spoke Nepali, 14.6% Gurung, 10.9% Yamphu, 10.7% Lohorung, 9.9% Sherpa, 5.1% Kulung, 4.2% Khaling, 3.9% Thulung, 2.3% Rai, 1.1% Yakkha, 1.0% Bahing, 1.0% Chamling, 1.0% Dumi, 0.9% Mewahang, 0.8% Sampang, 0.6% Tamang, 0.5% Nachhiring, 0.2% Maithili, 0.2% Magar, 0.2% Sanskrit and 1.5% other languages as their first language.

In terms of ethnicity/caste, 25.1% were Rai, 25.0% Gurung, 10.5% Yamphu, 9.9% Sherpa, 7.9% Lohorung, 3.9% Thulung, 3.2% Kami, 2.8% Kulung, 2.3% Chhetri, 1.8% Damai/Dholi, 1.4% Khaling, 1.3% Mewahang Bala, 1.2% Tamang, 1.1% Hill Brahmin, 0.6% Bahing, 0.4% Yakkha, 0.3% Limbu, 0.3% Magar, 0.3% Nachhiring, 0.2% Bhote and 0.7% others.

In terms of religion, 49.5% were Kirati, 36.1% Buddhist, 12.9% Hindu, 1.2% Christian and 0.3% others.

In terms of literacy, 70.7% could read and write, 3.4% could only read and 25.9% could neither read nor write.
