= Siddhapokhari =

Coordinates: 27°22′N 87°23′E

Siddhapokhari सिद्धपोखरी
- Interactive map of Siddhapokhari
- Country: Nepal
- Zone: Kosi Zone
- District: Sankhuwasabha District

Population (1991)
  - Total: 3,464
- Time zone: UTC+5:45 (Nepal Time)

Siddhapokhari is market center in Chainpur Municipality of Sankhuwasabha District in the Kosi Zone of north-eastern Nepal. At the time of the 1991 Nepal census it had a population of 3464 people living in 612 individual households.
