= Dipshikha Khadka =

Nepali actress and director

- दीपशिखा खड्का
- Born: 14 February 1994 (age 32); Dhankuta, Nepal
- Citizenship: Nepalese
- Occupations: Actress and director
- Years active: Present
- Parents: Surya Bahadur khadka (father); Padam Maya Khadka (mother)

Dipshikha Khadka (Nepali: दीपशिखा खड्का) is a Nepali actress and director. She is known for Prem Leela.

== About ==
Dipshikha Khadka was born on February 14, 1994, in the Dhankuta district of Nepal. She started her acting career with her debut movie, Premlila. In addition to acting in movies, she has also appeared in numerous music videos such as "Baja Bajaa Baaja", "malai aafno samjhiyara" and "Miss Gare". She has been honored with various awards including the Jyoti Film Music Award.

== Filmography ==
SN	Notable Work	Credit	ref
1	Prem Leela - Movie	Actress	
2	Samlingi - Music Video	Model	
3	Miss Gare	Model	

== Award ==
SN	Award Title	Category	Notable Work	Result	Ref
1	Jyoti Film Music Award - 2023 AD	Best Modern Song Video Director - Female	Samalangi	Won	
