= Makalu Rural Municipality =

Makalu मकालु गाउँपालिका
- Rural Municipality
- Location in Koshi Province Makalu (Nepal)
- Coordinates: 27.54°N 87.34°E
- Province: Koshi Province
- District: Sankhuwasabha
- Wards: 6
- Established: 10 March 2017

Government
  - Type: Rural Council
  - Chairperson: Ongdi Tsering Sherpa (Nepali Congress)
  - Vice-chairperson: Man Kala Rai (Communist Party of Nepal (Maoist Centre))

Area
  - Total: 519.45 km^{2} (200.56 sq mi)

Population (2011)
  - Total: 13,204
  - Density: 25.419/km^{2} (65.835/sq mi)
- Time zone: UTC+5:45 (Nepal Standard Time)
- Headquarter: Num
- Website: official website

Makalu (Nepali: मकालु गाउँपालिका) is a rural municipality (gaunpalika) out of five rural municipality located in Sankhuwasabha District of Koshi Province of Nepal. There are a total of 10 municipalities in Sankhuwasabha in which 5 are urban and 5 are rural.

According to Ministry of Federal Affairs and Local Developme Makalu has an area of 519.45 square kilometres (200.56 mi^{2}) and the total population of the municipality is 13204 as of Census of Nepal 2011.

Makalu, part of Yamphu, Num, part of Pawakhola and Pathibhara which previously were all separate Village development committee merged to form this new local level body. Fulfilling the requirement of the new Constitution of Nepal 2015, Ministry of Federal Affairs and Local Development replaced all old VDCs and Municipalities into 753 new local level body (Municipality).

The rural municipality is divided into total 6 wards and the headquarter of this newly formed rural municipality is situated in Num.

== Demographics ==
At the time of the 2011 Nepal census, Makalu Rural Municipality had a population of 13,572. Of these, 27.9% spoke Yamphu, 19.8% Sherpa, 17.8% Nepali, 10.7% Tamang, 8.7% Kulung, 4.8% Gurung, 3.5% Mewahang, 2.3% Khaling, 2.1% Rai, 0.9% Chamling, 0.4% Limbu, 0.2% Magar, 0.2% Maithili, 0.1% Nachhiring and 0.5% other languages as their first language.

In terms of ethnicity/caste, 25.4% were Yamphu, 19.1% Sherpa, 10.9% Tamang, 9.0% Gurung, 8.8% Rai, 8.3% Kulung, 6.2% Chhetri, 3.9% Mewahang Bala, 3.3% Kami, 1.3% Magar, 1.0% Damai/Dholi, 0.6% Hill Brahmin, 0.5% Topkegola, 0.4% Bhote, 0.4% Limbu, 0.2% Khaling, 0.1% Chamling, 0.1% Newar and 0.6% others.

In terms of religion, 43.8% were Kirati, 40.3% Buddhist, 12.5% Hindu, 3.2% Christian, 0.1% Prakriti and 0.1% others.

In terms of literacy, 59.1% could read and write, 4.9% could only read and 36.0% could neither read nor write.
