= Kharang =

Kharang खरांग
- Location in Nepal
- Coordinates: 27.26°N 87.24°E
- Country: Nepal
- Zone: Kosi Zone
- District: Sankhuwasabha District

Population (1991)
  - Total: 5,591
- Time zone: UTC+5:45 (Nepal Time)

Kharang is a market center in Chainpur Municipality in Sankhuwasabha District in the Kosi Zone of north-eastern Nepal. At the time of the 1991 Nepal census it had a population of 5,591.
