= Baneshwar, Sankhuwasabha =

Baneshwar बानेश्वर(संखुवासभा)
- Location in Nepal
- Coordinates: 27.28°N 87.29°E
- Country: Nepal
- Zone: Kosi Zone
- District: Sankhuwasabha District

Population (1991)
  - Total: 3,830
- Time zone: UTC+5:45 (Nepal Time)

Baneshwar is a former Village Development Committee and a market center in Chainpur Municipality in Sankhuwasabha District in the Kosi Zone of north-eastern Nepal. At the time of the 1991 Nepal census it had a population of 3830 people living in 688 individual households.
