= Savapokhari (VDC) =

Savapokhari सभापोखरी
- Former Village development committee
- Country: Nepal
- Zone: Kosi Zone
- District: Sankhuwasabha District

Population (1991)
  - Total: 2,834
- Time zone: UTC+5:45 (Nepal Time)

Savapokhari is a former village development committee currently located in Savapokhari Rural Municipality of Sankhuwasabha District in the Kosi Zone of north-eastern Nepal. At the time of the 1991 Nepal census it had a population of 2834 people living in 485 individual households. Shavapokhari village development committee contains 9 wards. The major attraction of this village development committee is Shavapokhari lake. This lake is situated at the height of around 3500 m from sea level. Generally people visit this area during the spring season. People more than ten thousand visit this place every year at Janai purnima.
