= Hile =

Hile हिले
- Hill station
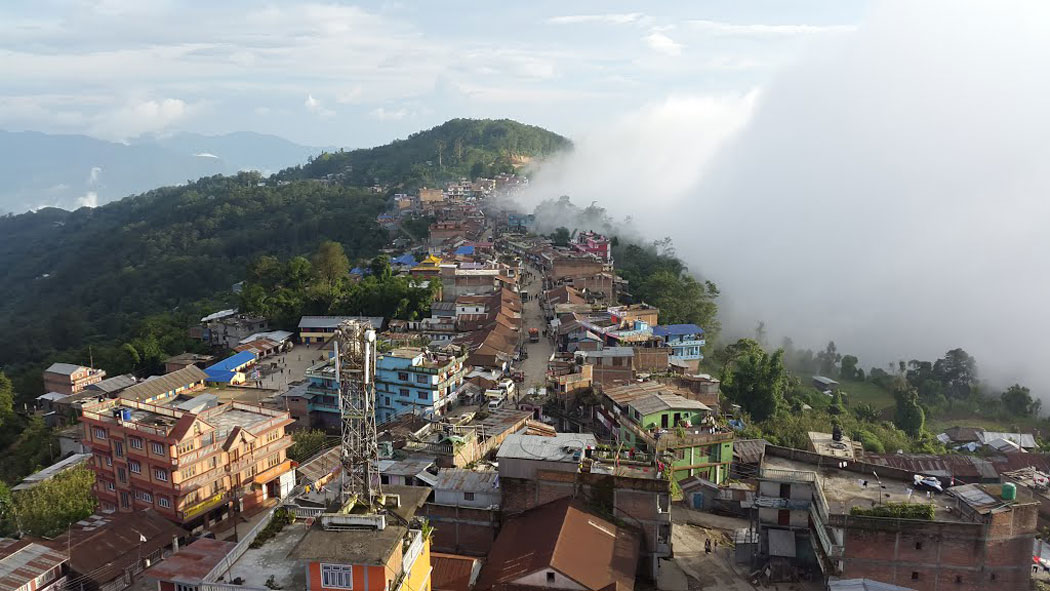
- A view of Hile Bazar

- Location in Koshi Province Hile (Nepal)
- Coordinates: 27°02′01.8″N 87°18′48.9″E
- Country: Nepal
- Province: Koshi Province
- District: Dhankuta
- Municipality: Dhankuta
- Ward No.: 1
- Elevation: 1,948 m (6,391 ft)
- Post code: 56806
- Area code: 026

Hile (Nepali: हिले) is a hill town and market centre in Ward No. 1 of Dhankuta municipality in Dhankuta district of Koshi province, eastern Nepal. It lies on the Koshi Highway about 13 kilometres north of Dhankuta Bazaar, the district and municipal headquarters, at an elevation of about 1,948 metres (6,391 ft) above sea level. Hile serves as a junction town on the route to the hill districts of Tehrathum district and Sankhuwasabha district, and as a commercial centre for surrounding rural communities along the middle hills of eastern Nepal.

== Geography ==
Hile is located on a ridge in the middle hills of eastern Nepal in Dhankuta district, Koshi Province, at 27°02′01.8″N 87°18′48.9″E. Administratively it falls within Ward No. 1 of Dhankuta Municipality. The bazaar area is strung out along the Koshi Highway, which runs roughly north–south, with steep agricultural slopes and forested hillsides falling away to either side. Hile’s elevation is about 1,948 metres (6,391 ft), making it substantially cooler than the lowland cities of Dharan and Biratnagar on the plains to the south.

== Climate ==
Hile’s elevation of about 1,948 metres gives it a cooler and often misty hill climate compared with the lowland plains of eastern Nepal. Travel accounts describe the town as remaining pleasantly cool even in early summer, with “cool misty air” common in the surrounding hills. Hile has no dedicated meteorological station. However, the temperatures are generally cooler than those recorded in nearby Dhankuta—where average temperatures range from about 12 °C in January to 23 °C in August—due to Hile’s higher elevation.

== Attractions ==
Hile is regarded as a small hill station with views over the middle hills of eastern Nepal and a cooler climate than the lowland cities to the south. The town’s main bazaar street features a large statue of a traditional tongba pot at Tongba Chowk, symbolising the millet-based alcoholic drink associated with the area.

The hills surrounding Hile contain several small tea estates and terraced farmland. Nearby estates such as Jun Chiyabari Tea Garden and the Guransé Tea Estate operate in the Dhankuta–Hile area and are known for high-elevation tea production.

A viewpoint tower above Hile offers panoramic views of the surrounding ridges and valleys, and is listed as a local attraction in travel guides. The open ground at Jautar community forest is used for fairs and community gatherings throughout the year.

Hile also serves as a starting point for hikes to nearby settlements such as Pakhribas and Uttarpani, and for longer treks toward Basantapur and the Tinjure–Milke–Jaljale ridge, which is known for its rhododendron forests and mountain landscapes.

A small Buddhist monastery near the bazaar, along with religious sites in the surrounding area, such as the Bakrakunda Temple, serve the local community and visiting pilgrims.

== Transportation ==
Hile lies on the Koshi Highway approximately 65 km (40 mi) north of Dharan and 13 km north of Dhankuta Bazaar. North of the town the highway continues towards Tehrathum District and Sankhuwasabha District, while a branch road to Bhojpur District leaves the main highway at Hile. Regular buses and jeeps connect Hile with Dharan, Dhankuta, Basantapur and other centres in eastern Nepal, and the town also serves as a transit point for passengers travelling to more remote hill districts.

The nearest major airport is at Biratnagar Airport, about 120 km by road to the south-east, reached via Dharan and Itahari.

== Economy and services ==
Hile functions as one of the main market centres within Dhankuta Municipality, serving surrounding rural communities in Ward No. 1 and neighbouring local levels. The bazaar area contains general stores, agricultural supply shops, small hotels and lodges, health posts and private clinics, fuel stations and schools.

The town has access to telephone and mobile networks, and internet services are available in the bazaar and nearby settlements.

Local eateries are known for serving dishes such as momo dumplings, sukuti (dried meat) and tongba, an alcoholic drink made from fermented millet that is popular in many parts of eastern Nepal.

== Gallery ==
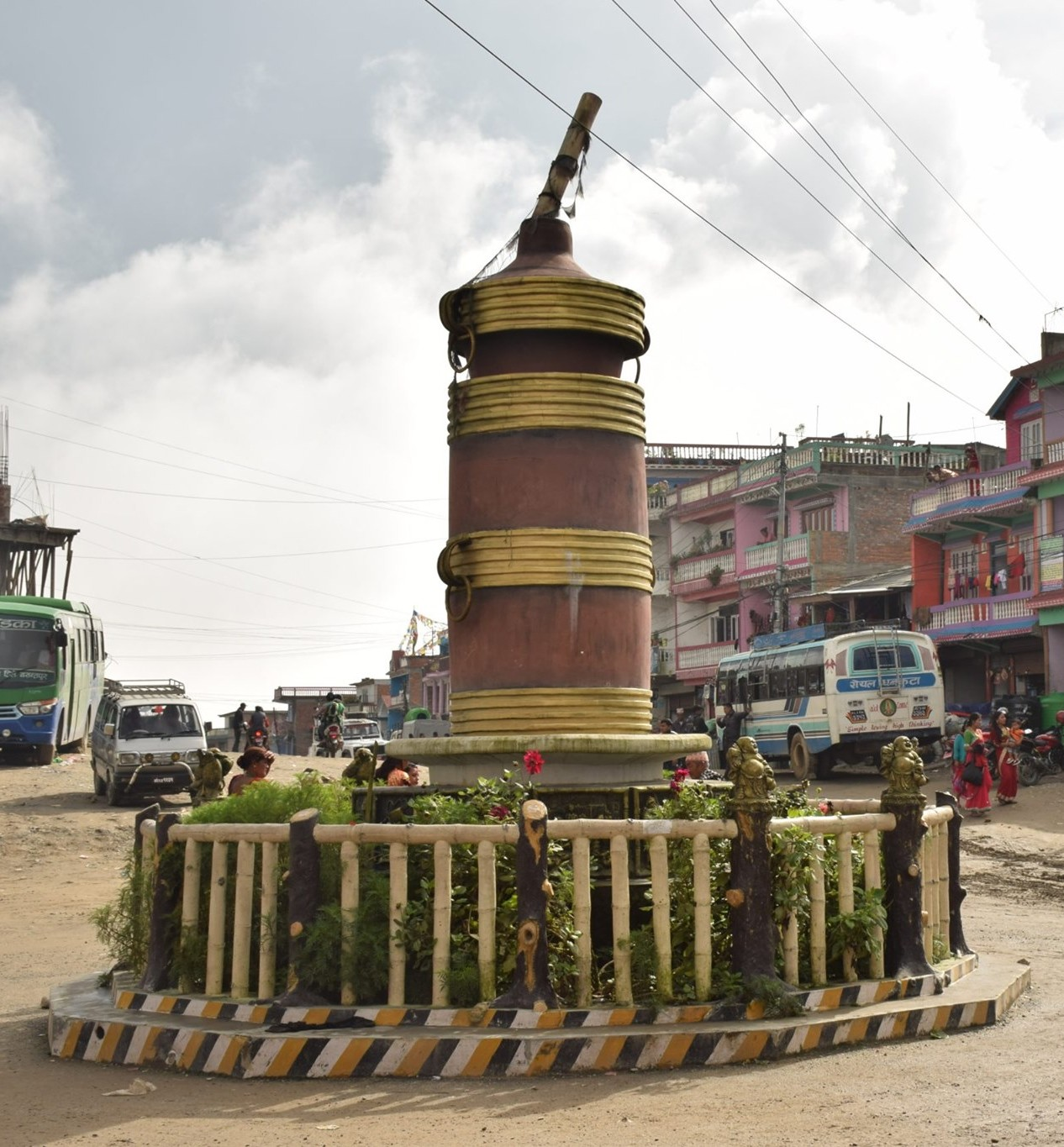
Tongba statue in Tongba Chowk

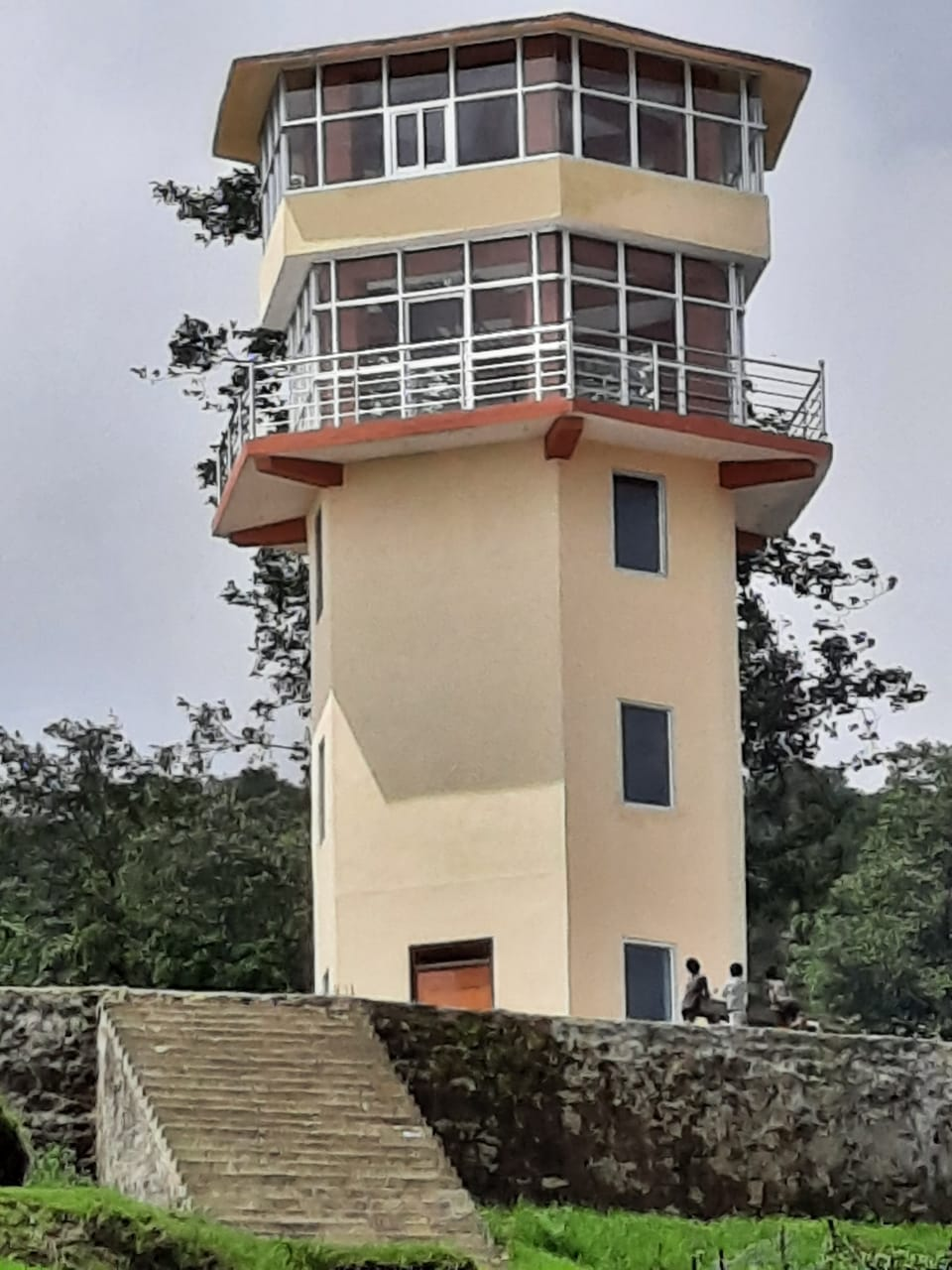
Hile View Tower

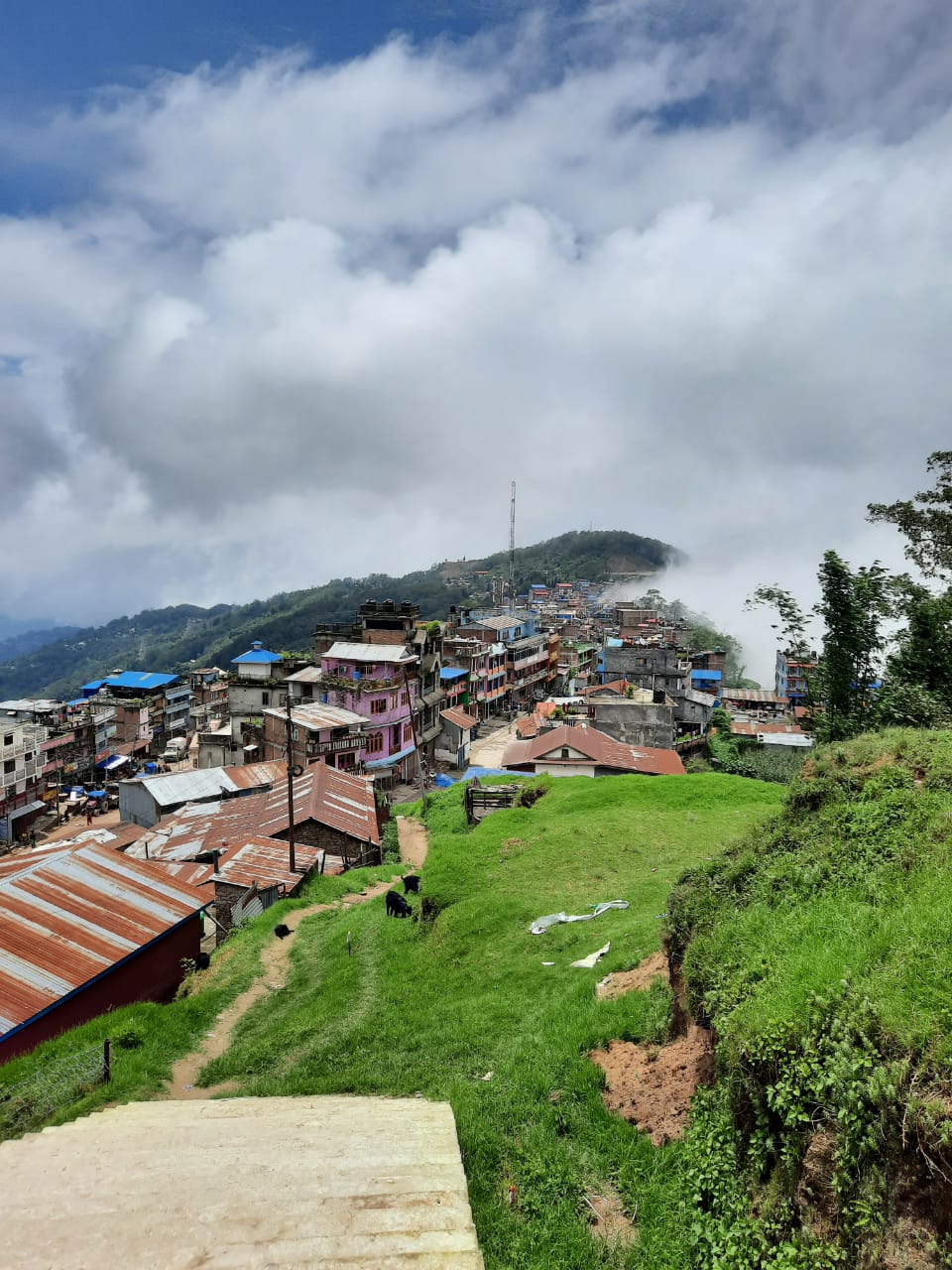
View from the base of Hile View Tower
