= Arun Valley =

Valley in Nepal

Arun Valley is located in Khandbari, Sankhuwasabha District, in the eastern Himalayas, between the Sagarmatha (Everest) and Makalu-Barun National Parks. At an altitude of about 457 meters (1,500 ft) above sea level, the valley is considered to be relatively deep. The Arun River flows through this valley, originating in Tibet and cutting deep through the Himalayas before joining the Sapta Koshi River in Nepal.

It is known for its biodiversity, being home to rare species such as the red panda and snow leopard. The valley also shows cultural diversity and is inhabited by various ethnic groups like the Rai, Sherpa, and Limbu communities. It is very popular for trekking and less crowded than the Everest region, with trails like Tumlingtar to Makalu Base Camp or Arun Valley to Everest.

== Sources ==
- Cronin, Edward W. (1979). The Arun: A Natural History of the World's Deepest Valley (PDF). Boston: Houghton Mifflin. ISBN 0-395-26299-2.
- Shrestha, T.B. (1989). Development Ecology of the Arun River Basin in Nepal (PDF). ICIMOD senior fellowship series. International Centre for Integrated Mountain Development.
