= Sabha River =

River in Nepal

Location
- Country: Nepal

Physical characteristics
- Source: Sabha Lekh
  - location: Nepal
- Mouth: Arun River
  - location: south of Tumlingtar, Sankhuwasabha District, Nepal
  - coordinates: 27°16′23″N 87°12′28″E

The Sabha River originates from Sabha Lake in eastern Nepal. The Sankhuwasabha District has two major parts, eastern and northern; the Sabha River separates these two parts of the district.

Sabha River is very clear because most of the water is collected from land sources, not from the mountains. It is also the source of irrigation and drinking water on its banks. The river is not very long, but is very useful for the local people as it is also a source of fish. The Sabha is useful for irrigation and for hydroelectricity if it is utilized well. The river joins with Arun River at the south of Tumlingtar.
