= Sibha =

Coordinates: 27°30′N 87°06′E

Sibha is a village of remote eastern part of Nepal located in Tamku VDC.
