= Mewahang language =

Kiranti language of Nepal

Mewahang
- Meohang
- Native to: Nepal
- Region: Koshi Province
- Native speakers: 4,700 (2011 census)
- Language family: Sino-Tibetan: Tibeto-Burman; Mahakiranti (?); Kiranti; Eastern; Upper Arun; Mewahang

Language codes
- ISO 639-3: Either: emg – Eastern raf – Western
- Glottolog: mewa1252

Mewahang (Meohang, Mewahang pronunciation [mewaːhaːŋ]), or Newahang, is a Kiranti language spoken in Nepal. Speakers are shifting to Nepali, which has already replaced it in a number of villages. The eastern and western dialects are structurally distinct.

== Names ==
Mewahang has been referred to particularly in the linguistic literature as Meohang, Newahang, Newahang Jimi, Meohang-Sam, and Balali.

== Status ==
The 2001 Nepal census recorded 904 speakers of Mewahang. The number of speakers is decreasing due to replacement by the national language Nepali, Bantawa, spoken as a lingua franca among Rai people, and English among educated people. It may therefore go extinct in the near future. All Mewahang speak Nepali, either as their first or second language, though they may also speak regional languages such as Kulung, Sampang, Yakkha, Lohorung, or Hindi or English as well. In many villages, Mewahang has already been completely replaced by Nepali, and the rate of Mewahang language transmission children is decreasing. The Atlas of the World's Languages in Danger classifies Mewahang as Severely Endangered. However, attitude towards the Mewahang language is positive, and Mewahang people have a very strong ethnic identity. In contrast, Mewahang speakers living in Tamku and Yamdang say that Mewahang was considered a "men-eater language"; consequently, attitudes toward the language there are more negative, and that speakers were ashamed to speak it in these villages.

== Geographic distribution and dialects ==
Western Mewahang is spoken in the upper Arun valley west of the Arun River in Sankhuwasabha District, Koshi Province, in the villages of Bala, Yamdang, Tamku, and Sisuwa.

- The Bala dialect is spoken in Bala village, Sankhuwasabha VDC.
- The Bumdemba dialect is spoken in Sishuwakhola VDC.

Eastern Mewahang is spoken in Mangtewa, Yaphu, and Choyang VDC's of Sankhuwasabha District, Koshi Province. It is spoken in the upper Arun valley east of the Arun River.

- The Sunsari dialect is spoken Bhaludhunga and Bishnupaduka VDC's of Sunsari District.
- The Dibum (Dibung) dialect is spoken in Mangtewa VDC
- The Mulgaon-Wangtang dialect is spoken in Yaphu VDC.

== Phonology ==
=== Consonants ===
The consonants of Mewahang are similar to those of other Kiranti languages. The following table is only a preliminary overview of the consonant system. According to this analysis, Mewahang has 27 consonants.

		Labial	Alveolar	Postalveolar	Dorsal	Glottal
Nasal		m	n		ŋ	
Plosive/ Affricate	voiceless	p	t	tʃ	k	ʔ
Plosive/ Affricate	voiceless aspirated	pʰ	tʰ	tʃʰ	kʰ	
Plosive/ Affricate	voiced	b	d	(dʒ)	ɡ	
Plosive/ Affricate	voiced aspirated	bʱ	dʱ	(dʒʱ)	ɡʱ	
Trill/Flap			r			
Fricative			s			h
Approximant		w	l lʱ	j		

/dʒ, dʒʱ/ are found almost exclusively in Nepali loanwords; there are no minimal pairs for these consonants.

=== Vowels ===
Mewahang has seven basic vowels and five long vowels.

	front	central	back
high	i iː	ɨ	u uː
mid	e eː	ʌ	o oː
low		a aː	

== Morphology ==
=== Noun ===
==== Gender ====
Agreement in Mewahang does not incorporate gender, as in other Kiranti languages.

nana caːma ca-ʔa
elder.sister rice eat-PST
'Elder sister ate rice'

bubu caːma ca-ʔa
elder.brother rice eat-PST
'Elder brother ate rice'
