= Tamaphok =

Coordinates: 27°12′N 87°24′E

Tamaphok तामाफोक
- Village development committee
- Interactive map of Tamaphok
- Country: Nepal
- Zone: Kosi Zone
- District: Sankhuwasabha District

Population (1991)
  - Total: 5,634
- Time zone: UTC+5:45 (Nepal Time)

Tamaphok is a village development committee in Sankhuwasabha District in the Kosi Zone of north-eastern Nepal. At the time of the 1991 Nepal census it had a population of 5634 people living in 1096 individual households.
