= Chepuwa =

Village development committee in Kosi Zone, Nepal

Thangmuchhyi थाङमुछ्यी थाङमुछ्यी Chepuwa
- Village development committee
- Nickname: Chhongdi(छोङदी)
- Location in Nepal
- Coordinates: 27.77°N 87.52°E
- Country: Nepal
- Zone: Kosi Zone
- District: Sankhuwasabha District

Population (1991)
  - Total: 1,949
- Time zone: UTC+5:45 (Nepal Time)

Thangmuchhyi (Chepuwa) is a village development committee in Sankhuwasabha District in the Kosi Zone of north-eastern Nepal. At the time of the 1991 Nepal census it had a population of 1949 people living in 425 individual households. Thangmuchhyi divided into 3 toles called Dhongdek, Syarkijong (Syarkidang) and Orokchhen and Gangdok and Chhulung also sub tole of Thangmuchhyi. People from Thangmuchhyi are mostly Nuppa clan of Bhote and Lhomi. Among Nuppa also there are 3 main family groups called Mi-Ngo (Identity). Sonarinjen (Dhongtoek) Mi-Ngo, Ueohok (lower village) Mi-Ngo and Hamo Mi-Ngo. In Dhongtoek (upper household) tole, Sonarinjen clans are living and from Sonarinjen there were three brothers called Nangang Angchuk, Chhiyang Chhedar and Dhinakpa (real name forgotten).

It borders Tibet, China.
