= Madi Rambeni =

Madi Rambeni मादी रामवेनी
- Village development committee
- Location in Nepal
- Coordinates: 27.27°N 87.37°E
- Country: Nepal
- Zone: Koshi Zone
- District: Sankhuwasabha District

Population (1991)
  - Total: 4,741
- Time zone: UTC+5:45

Madi Rambeni is a village development committee in Sankhuwasabha District in the Koshi Zone of north-eastern Nepal. At the time of the 1991 Nepal census it had a population of 4741 people living in 919 individual households.
