= Mangtewa =

Mangtewa माङतेवा
- Village development committee
- Location in Nepal
- Coordinates: 27.49°N 87.14°E
- Country: Nepal
- Zone: Kosi Zone
- District: Sankhuwasabha District

Population (1991)
  - Total: 2,216
- Time zone: UTC+5:45 (Nepal Time)

Mangtewa is a village development committee in Sankhuwasabha District in the Kosi Zone of north-eastern Nepal. At the time of the 1991 Nepal census it had a population of 2216 people living in 418 individual households.
