= Bahrabise, Sankhuwasabha =

Coordinates: 27°47′N 85°54′E

Bahrabise Bazar बाह्रबिसे
- Village development committee
- Interactive map of Bahrabise Bazar
- Country: Nepal
- Zone: Kosi Zone
- District: Sankhuwasabha District

Population (1991)
  - Total: 2,864
- Time zone: UTC+5:45 (Nepal Time)
- Postal code: 56905
- Area code: 029

Bahrabise Bazar is a village development committee in Sankhuwasabha District in the Kosi Zone of north-eastern Nepal. At the time of the 1991 Nepal census it had a population of 2864 people living in 519 individual households.
