= Mawadin =

Mawadin मावादिन
- Village development committee
- Location in Nepal
- Coordinates: 27.28°N 87.43°E
- Country: Nepal
- Zone: Kosi Zone
- District: Sankhuwasabha District

Population (1991)
  - Total: 3,353
- Time zone: UTC+5:45 (Nepal Time)

Mawadin is a village development committee in Sankhuwasabha District in the Kosi Zone of north-eastern Nepal. At the time of the 1991 Nepal census it had a population of 3353 people living in 634 individual households.
