= Mamling =

Mamling माम्लिंग
- Village development committee
- Location in Nepal
- Coordinates: 27.24°N 87.34°E
- Country: Nepal
- Zone: Kosi Zone
- District: Sankhuwasabha District

Population (1991)
  - Total: 3,457
- Time zone: UTC+5:45 (Nepal Time)
- Postal code: 56911
- Area code: 029

Mamling is a village development committee in Sankhuwasabha District in the Kosi Zone of north-eastern Nepal. At the time of the 1991 Nepal census it had a population of 3457 people living in 630 individual households.
