= Savapokhari Rural Municipality =

Sabhapokhari सभापोखरी गाउँपालिका
- Rural Municipality
- Location in Koshi Province Sabhapokhari (Nepal)
- Coordinates: 27.450019°N 87.300000°E
- Province: Koshi Province
- District: Sankhuwasabha
- Wards: 6
- Established: 10 March 2017

Government
  - Type: Rural Council
  - Chairperson: Mr. Bhim Bahadur Limbu (Nepali Congress)
  - Vice-chairperson: Mrs. Laxmi Chapagain (Communist Party of Nepal (Unified Socialist))

Area
  - Total: 222.08 km^{2} (85.75 sq mi)

Population (2011)
  - Total: 10,492
  - Density: 47.244/km^{2} (122.36/sq mi)
- Time zone: UTC+5:45 (Nepal Standard Time)
- Postal Code: 56900
- Headquarter: Bahrabise
- Website: official website

Savapokhari (Nepali: सभापोखरी गाउँपालिका) is a rural municipality (gaunpalika) out of five rural municipality located in Sankhuwasabha District of Koshi Province of Nepal. There are a total of 10 municipalities in Sankhuwasabha in which 5 are urban and 5 are rural.

According to Ministry of Federal Affairs and Local Developme Savapokhari has an area of 222.08 square kilometres (85.75 mi^{2}) and the total population of the municipality is 10492 as of Census of Nepal 2011.

Savapokhari, Dhupu and Bahrabise which previously were all separate Village development committee merged to form this new local level body. Fulfilling the requirement of the new Constitution of Nepal 2015, Ministry of Federal Affairs and Local Development replaced all old VDCs and Municipalities into 753 new local level body (Municipality).

The rural municipality is divided into total 6 wards and the headquarter of this newly formed rural municipality is situated in Bahrabise.

== Demographics ==
At the time of the 2011 Nepal census, Savapokhari Rural Municipality had a population of 10,492. Of these, 42.9% spoke Nepali, 21.1% Limbu, 14.3% Tamang, 6.7% Magar, 6.1% Rai, 3.1% Lohorung, 1.8% Gurung, 1.2% Newar, 0.6% Chamling, 0.6% Thulung, 0.5% Yamphu and 0.8% other languages as their first language.

In terms of ethnicity/caste, 23.8% were Limbu, 20.3% Rai, 16.4% Tamang, 8.7% Chhetri, 8.0% Magar, 7.1% Hill Brahmin, 4.7% Kami, 2.9% Gurung, 2.3% Lohorung, 1.9% Damai/Dholi, 1.6% Newar, 0.7% Sanyasi/Dasnami, 0.6% Kayastha, 0.2% other Terai, 0.2% Thulung and 0.4% others.

In terms of religion, 37.2% were Hindu, 36.3% Kirati, 25.2% Buddhist, 1.1% Christian and 0.1% others.

In terms of literacy, 67.4% could read and write, 2.6% could only read and 29.9% could neither read nor write.
