= Yaphu =

Yaphu याफु
- Former Village development committee
- Location in Nepal
- Coordinates: 27.61°N 87.11°E
- Country: Nepal
- Province: Koshi Province
- District: Sankhuwasabha District
- Rural Municipality: Makalu Rural Municipality

Population (1991)
  - Total: 2,407
- Time zone: UTC+5:45 (Nepal Time)

Yaphu is a former village development committee currently located in Makalu Rural Municipality of Sankhuwasabha District in the Koshi Province(Previously Kosi zone) of north-eastern Nepal. At the time of the 1991 Nepal census it had a population of 2407 people living in 518 individual households.
