= Aankhibhui =

Place in Nepal

Aankhibhui आँखिभुईं
- Village development committee
- Location in Nepal
- Coordinates: 27.21°N 87.28°E
- Country: Nepal
- Zone: Kosi Zone
- District: Sankhuwasabha District

Population (1991)
  - Total: 7,019
- Time zone: UTC+5:45 (Nepal Time)
- Postal code: 56910
- Area code: 029

Aankhibhui is a village development committee in Sankhuwasabha District in the Kosi Zone of north-eastern Nepal. At the time of the 1991 Nepal census it had a population of 7019 people living in 1296 individual households. It was VDC with highest population in the district.

== Education ==
This VDC has three secondary schools which are named as Mahendra Jyoti Madhyamik Bidhyalaya after the name of former King Mahendra, Amaruwa Madhyamik Bidhyalaya after the name of one of the wards in the village and latest established is Bhagawati Madhyamik Bidhyalaya. ″Amaruwa Ma. Vi.″

″Mahendra Jyoti Ma. Vi.″ It was established by past gaun panchayat president Buddhi Bahadur Basnet and other three people from the same panchayat have contributed to his work. Later his work was upgraded by many villagers. Chewan chandra Basnet, Min bahadur Karki, Chandra Bahadur Bharati and Sher Bahadur Karki have built the school building.

″Bhagawati Ma. Vi.″
