= Madi Mulkharka =

Madi Mulkharka मादी मुलखर्क
- Village development committee
- Location in Nepal
- Coordinates: 27.24°N 87.43°E
- Country: Nepal
- Zone: Kosi Zone
- District: Sankhuwasabha District

Population (1991)
  - Total: 6,201
- Time zone: UTC+5:45 (Nepal Time)

Madi Mulkharka is a village development committee in Sankhuwasabha District in the Kosi Zone of north-eastern Nepal. At the time of the 1991 Nepal census it had a population of 6201 people living in 1147 individual households.
