= Syabun =

Syabun स्यावुन
- Village development committee
- Location in Nepal
- Coordinates: 27.38°N 87.31°E
- Country: Nepal
- Zone: Kosi Zone
- District: Sankhuwasabha District

Population (1991)
  - Total: 5,603
- Time zone: UTC+5:45 (Nepal Time)

Syabun (Newar: स्यबुं) is a village development committee in Sankhuwasabha District in the Kosi Zone of north-eastern Nepal. At the time of the 1991 Nepal census it had a population of 5603 people living in 1006 individual households.
