= Zhêntang =

Zhêntang འདྲེན་ཐང་གྲོང་བརྡལ · 陈塘镇 Chentang
- Town
- Location within Tibet Autonomous Region
- Coordinates: 27°51′39″N 87°25′13″E
- Country: People's Republic of China
- Autonomous region: Tibet
- Prefecture-level city: Shigatse
- County: Dinggyê

Population (2010)
  - Total: 2,043
- Time zone: UTC+8 (China Standard)

Zhêntang Town

Chinese name
- Simplified Chinese: 陈塘镇
- Traditional Chinese: 陳塘鎮
Transcriptions
Standard Mandarin
- Hanyu Pinyin: Chéntáng zhèn

Tibetan name
- Tibetan: འདྲེན་ཐང་གྲོང་བརྡལ
Transcriptions
- Wylie: 'dren thang grong brdal
- Tibetan Pinyin: Zhêntang Chongdai

Zhêntang Town (Chinese: 陈塘镇; Tibetan: འདྲེན་ཐང), also known as Chentang, is a town in Dinggyê County, in the Shigatse prefecture-level city of the Tibet Autonomous Region of China. It is a border town on the China–Nepal border and lies on the Pum Qu River. At the time of the 2010 census, the town had a population of 2,043. As of 2013, it had 6 communities under its administration.

== People ==
Most of the population of the vicinity are Sherpa people. Due to the fact that Sherpa is not one of the recognized ethnic minorities in China, they are classified as "Others" on their citizenship. However, Sherpa is stated as part of their household registration. Many locals cultivate finger millet using terraces on the slopes for produce, which can be used to make Chhaang, an alcoholic beverage popular in the region. Many of the families in valley have two homes — one for the growing season high up on the slopes, the other in the valley to shelter through the colder winter.

The Sherpas in the region are considered to be good dancers, with similarities to many ethnic groups in Nepal. Most of the locals practice Buddhism. There is an elementary school in the township. However, children would need to go to Dinggyê County for boarding middle school and Shigatse prefecture for boarding high school.

== Border ==
The bordering Nepalese town is Kimathanka. The border was part of brief dispute between China and Nepal before 1960. The dispute was resolved in their 1961 border agreement. There is small scale local trade. The local cross-border trade has gotten so important in the recent decades that in 2008 when Chinese tightened its border control during the 2008 Summer Olympics, the bordering Nepalese towns faced food shortages due to disruption of local trade. A Chinese border checkpoint was set up in 2011 checking border crossing permits of Nepalese. In 2015, there were recorded 7700 border crossings and the annual trade at this port was valued at CN¥ 18,650,000.
