= Hatiya, Makwanpur =

Hatiya हटिया
- Village development committee
- Location in Nepal
- Coordinates: 27.37°N 85.10°E
- Country: Nepal
- Province: Bagmati Province
- District: Makwanpur District
- Submetropolitan city: Hetauda

Population (1991)
  - Total: 3,322
- Time zone: UTC+5:45 (Nepal Time)

Hatiya is a village development committee in the Hetauda Submetropolitan City of Makwanpur District in the Bagmati Province of Nepal. At the time of the 1991 Nepal census it had a population of 3322 people living in 516 individual households.
