= Chainpur Municipality =

Municipality in Koshi Province, Nepal

Chainpur चैनपुर नगरपालिका
- Municipality
- Location in Nepal
- Coordinates: 27.30°N 87.32°E
- Country: Nepal
- Province: Koshi
- District: Sankhuwasabha

Government
  - Mayor: Krishna Kumar Tamang (NCP)
  - Deputy Mayor: Alina Shrestha (NCP)

Area
  - Total: 223.69 km^{2} (86.37 sq mi)
  - Rank: 10th (Province No. 1)

Population (2011)
  - Total: 27,308
  - Density: 122.08/km^{2} (316.18/sq mi)
- Time zone: UTC+5:45 (NST)
- Postal code: 56913
- Area code: 029
- Website: www.chainpurmun.gov.np

Chainpur (Nepali: चैनपुर नगरपालिका, Chainpur Nagarpalika; in Nepali) is a municipality in Sankhuwasabha District in the Koshi Province of north-eastern Nepal. It was formed by merging five villages i.e. Chainpur, Siddhakali, Siddhapokhari, Baneshwar and Kharang. The municipality was implemented on 18 May 2014. At the time of the 1991 Nepal census it had a population of 4933 people in 948 households.

Chainpur is an ancient market place of the eastern region of Nepal. It has been famous for hundreds of years for the Karuwa, a special kind of water mug with a pipe tap sculptured with artistic carving on exterior of it.

It used to be district headquarters of Sankhuwasabha before it was shifted to Khandbari.

Chainpur is famous for making Khukuri.

== Demographics ==
At the time of the 2011 Nepal census, Chainpur Municipality had a population of 27,462. Of these, 48.4% spoke Nepali, 13.6% Tamang, 10.4% Sherpa, 9.6% Limbu, 3.3% Yakkha, 2.8% Newar, 2.0% Chamling, 1.8% Magar, 1.7% Khaling, 1.6% Rai, 1.4% Thulung, 0.9% Kulung, 0.8% Gurung, 0.4% Jerung, 0.2% Dumi, 0.2% Maithili, 0.1% Bantawa, 0.1% Nachhiring, 0.1% Puma, 0.1% Rajasthani and 0.3% other languages as their first language.

In terms of ethnicity/caste, 24.7% were Chhetri, 15.1% Tamang, 10.5% Sherpa, 10.2% Limbu, 7.8% Rai, 6.1% Hill Brahmin, 6.1% Newar, 4.0% Kami, 3.7% Yakkha, 2.3% Magar, 2.0% Damai/Dholi, 2.0% Sarki, 1.0% Gurung, 0.8% Chamling, 0.8% Thulung, 0.7% Khaling, 0.6% Kulung, 0.3% Gharti/Bhujel, 0.3% Sanyasi/Dasnami, 0.1% Bantawa, 0.1% other Dalit, 0.1% Dhandi, 0.1% Majhi, 0.1% Marwadi, 0.1% Tharu, 0.1% Yadav and 0.5% others.

In terms of religion, 48.3% were Hindu, 28.3% Buddhist, 21.4% Kirati, 1.4% Christian, 0.1% Jain, 0.1% Prakriti and 0.4% others.

In terms of literacy, 71.6% could read and write, 2.5% could only read and 25.9% could neither read nor write.

== Climate ==
Climate data for Chainpur, elevation 1,277 m (4,190 ft), (1991–2020 normals)
Month	Jan	Feb	Mar	Apr	May	Jun	Jul	Aug	Sep	Oct	Nov	Dec	Year
Mean daily maximum °C (°F)	18.2 (64.8)	20.7 (69.3)	25.1 (77.2)	27.6 (81.7)	28.0 (82.4)	28.4 (83.1)	27.6 (81.7)	27.9 (82.2)	27.2 (81.0)	25.8 (78.4)	22.6 (72.7)	19.5 (67.1)	24.9 (76.8)
Daily mean °C (°F)	12.4 (54.3)	14.7 (58.5)	18.5 (65.3)	21.0 (69.8)	22.0 (71.6)	23.3 (73.9)	23.3 (73.9)	23.3 (73.9)	22.5 (72.5)	20.2 (68.4)	16.6 (61.9)	13.7 (56.7)	19.3 (66.7)
Mean daily minimum °C (°F)	6.6 (43.9)	8.6 (47.5)	11.9 (53.4)	14.4 (57.9)	15.9 (60.6)	18.2 (64.8)	19.0 (66.2)	18.7 (65.7)	17.7 (63.9)	14.6 (58.3)	10.6 (51.1)	7.8 (46.0)	13.7 (56.6)
Average precipitation mm (inches)	13.9 (0.55)	16.4 (0.65)	37.3 (1.47)	94.6 (3.72)	203.0 (7.99)	223.8 (8.81)	297.0 (11.69)	275.3 (10.84)	202.0 (7.95)	57.6 (2.27)	15.7 (0.62)	10.8 (0.43)	1,447.4 (56.98)
Source 1: Department of Hydrology and Meteorology
Source 2: Agricultural Extension in South Asia (precipitation 1976–2005)
