= Jaljala, Sankhuwasabha =

Jaljala जलजला
- Village development committee
- Location in Nepal
- Coordinates: 27.35°N 87.35°E
- Country: Nepal
- Zone: Kosi Zone
- District: Sankhuwasabha District

Population (1991)
  - Total: 5,211
- Time zone: UTC+5:45 (Nepal Time)

Jaljala is a village development committee in Sankhuwasabha District in the Kosi Zone of north-eastern Nepal. At the time of the 1991 Nepal census it had a population of 5211 people living in 921 individual households.
