= Tamku =

Tamku ताम्कु
- Village development committee
- Location in Nepal
- Coordinates: 27.58°N 87.06°E
- Country: Nepal
- Zone: Kosi Zone
- District: Sankhuwasabha District

Population (1991)
  - Total: 3,044
- Time zone: UTC+5:45 (Nepal Time)
- Postal code: 56903
- Area code: 029

Tamku is a village development committee in Sankhuwasabha District in the Kosi Zone of north-eastern Nepal. At the time of the 1991 Nepal census it had a population of 3044 people living in 588 individual households.

== List of villages ==
- Sibha
- Lakuwa
- Yachamkha
- Sintup
- Saptael
- Kanpek
- Sikidim
- Saija
- Pantima
- Khanigaun
- kolba
