= Num, Nepal =

Num नुम
- Former Village development committee
- Location in Nepal
- Coordinates: 27.54°N 87.34°E
- Country: Nepal
- Provinces: Koshi Province
- District: Sankhuwasabha District
- Rural Municipality: Makalu Rural Municipality

Population (1991)
  - Total: 2,526
- Time zone: UTC+5:45 (Nepal Time)

Num is a former village development committee currently located in Makalu Rural Municipality of Sankhuwasabha District in the Koshi Province (Previously Kosi Zone) of north-eastern Nepal. At the time of the 1991 Nepal census it had a population of 2526 people living in 468 individual households.

== Climate ==
Climate data for Num, elevation 1,497 m (4,911 ft)
Month	Jan	Feb	Mar	Apr	May	Jun	Jul	Aug	Sep	Oct	Nov	Dec	Year
Mean daily maximum °C (°F)	15.3 (59.5)	17.6 (63.7)	20.6 (69.1)	21.5 (70.7)	22.3 (72.1)	25.2 (77.4)	25.2 (77.4)	25.7 (78.3)	24.7 (76.5)	23.7 (74.7)	20.7 (69.3)	17.3 (63.1)	21.6 (71.0)
Daily mean °C (°F)	10.3 (50.5)	12.0 (53.6)	15.1 (59.2)	18.3 (64.9)	18.7 (65.7)	21.2 (70.2)	21.7 (71.1)	21.7 (71.1)	20.7 (69.3)	18.7 (65.7)	14.8 (58.6)	11.6 (52.9)	17.1 (62.7)
Mean daily minimum °C (°F)	5.4 (41.7)	6.4 (43.5)	9.8 (49.6)	15.3 (59.5)	15.0 (59.0)	17.3 (63.1)	18.1 (64.6)	17.7 (63.9)	16.7 (62.1)	13.8 (56.8)	9.0 (48.2)	5.9 (42.6)	12.5 (54.6)
Average precipitation mm (inches)	32.2 (1.27)	55.9 (2.20)	103.0 (4.06)	267.4 (10.53)	508.7 (20.03)	824.7 (32.47)	796.5 (31.36)	675.7 (26.60)	554.5 (21.83)	233.3 (9.19)	47.9 (1.89)	20.6 (0.81)	4,120.4 (162.24)
Source: FAO JICA
