= Pawakhola =

Pawakhola पावाखोला
- Former Village development committee
- Location in Nepal
- Coordinates: 27.63°N 87.45°E
- Country: Nepal
- Zone: Kosi Zone
- District: Sankhuwasabha District

Population (1991)
  - Total: 2,602
- Time zone: UTC+5:45 (Nepal Time)

Pawakhola is a former village development committee currently in Makalu Rural Municipality of Sankhuwasabha District in the Koshi Province (Previously Kosi Zone) of north-eastern Nepal. At the time of the 1991 Nepal census it had a population of 2602 people living in 472 individual households.
