= Dhankuta =

Dhankuta धनकुटा
- City
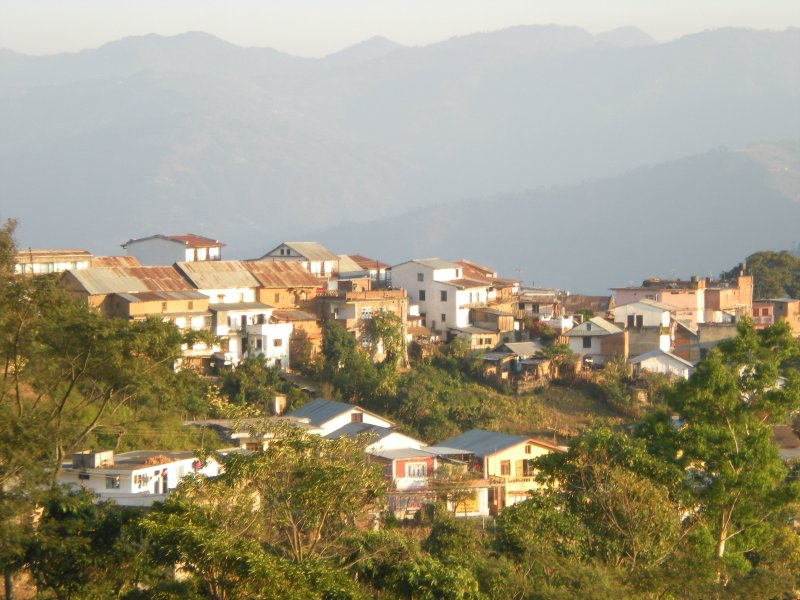
- A view of Dhankuta hill town
- Nickname: Eastern Hillstation
- Motto(s): Hamro Dhankuta, Ramro Dhankuta
- Location in Koshi Province Dhankuta (Nepal)
- Coordinates: 26°59′0″N 87°20′0″E
- Country: Nepal
- Province: Koshi Province
- District: Dhankuta District

Government
  - Mayor: Mr. Chintan Tamang (NCP)
  - Deputy Mayor: Ms. Bhima Devi Khanal (NCP)

Population (2011)
  - Total: 26,440
  - Ethnicities: Athpare Yakkha Limbu Brahmin Chhetri Gurung
  - Religions: Yuma Sammang Kirat Mundhum Hinduism Buddhist
- Time zone: UTC+5:45 (NST)
- Postal Code: 56800
- Area code: 026
- Climate: Cwa
- Highway: Koshi Highway
- Website: www.dhankutamun.gov.np

Dhankuta (Nepali: धनकुटा) is a hill town and the headquarters of Dhankuta District in Koshi Province in Eastern Nepal. According to 2011 Nepal census, it has population of 26,440 inhabitants.

== History ==
Until about 1963, Dhankuta Bazaar (the town) was the administrative headquarters for the whole of north-eastern Nepal. Located a half-mile above the town were the buildings of the Bada Hakim, the feudal district which governed the whole north-eastern region. The town also held the regional jail and army post. Because of Dhankuta's isolation from the lowland Terai and from Kathmandu, it was in many ways a self-governing area.

Income to purchase items (cloth, kerosene, batteries, medicines, etc.) that could not be produced locally came from a combination of sales of hill produce (tangerines, potatoes, etc.) and funds repatriated to their native areas by Gorkha soldiers serving first in the British and then more-often in the Indian armies.

The first five American Peace Corps volunteers arrived in Dhankuta Bazaar in Fall 1962 to work as teachers in the two high schools. In October 1963 three additional volunteers arrived to help establish the new Panchayat Development program.

From 1963 Nepal was divided into 75 Panchayat Districts, and the traditional Dhankuta administrative region was divided up into about six of the panchayat districts. The power of the Bada Hakim was transferred to the central government's appointed Panchayat Development Officer and each district's elected Panchayat President.

During the pre-panchayat period Dhankuta Bazaar prided itself as being in the cultural vanguard, a relatively progressive community with its own "intellectual" elite. Dhankuta Bazaar, already in the 1930s, had the only high school in Nepal to be located outside of the Kathmandu Valley. Early on it added a girl's high school and a two-year college.

Then and now there is a sharp contrast between Dhankuta Bazaar and the surrounding rural villages. The town is a commercial center and has a population that is primarily Newar. The surrounding area is agricultural and the population is made up of many caste/tribal groups, notably Athpare, Limbu, Yakkha, Rai, Magar, Tamang and Tibetan.

One of the famous places in Dhankuta is Hile. It serves as a gateway to Dhankuta and Panchthar districts and from here, visitors can also trek to the temple of Goddes Pahtibhara, situated three kilometers west of the place. Another place situated here is the Rajarani valley, which is a place of historical significance and is also believed to be the capital of Limbu kingdom in the past. The place that once had two ponds called Raja and Rani now lay as plain areas.

Looking north to Dhankuta Bazaar and Hile Bazaar from Chuliban

== Demographics ==
At the 2011 Nepal census, Dhankuta Municipality had a population of 38,629. Of these, 49.8% spoke Nepali, 14.6% Athpare, 7.0% Tamang, 6.6% Magar, 6.2% Newar, 4.5% Rai, 3.5% Limbu, 2.1% Bantawa, 1.2% Maithili, 0.6% Yakkha, 0.5% Sherpa, 0.4% Chamling, 0.3% Sampang, 0.3% Urdu, 0.2% Bhujel, 0.2% Gurung, 0.2% Hindi, 0.1% Bhojpuri, 0.1% Chhiling, 0.1% Chintang, 0.1% Khaling, 0.1% Kulung, 0.1% Majhi, 0.1% Tharu, 0.1% Thulung, 0.1% Yamphu and 0.3% other languages as their first language.

In terms of ethnicity/caste, 20.5% were Chhetri, 15.7% Aathpariya, 10.1% Rai, 9.6% Hill Brahmin, 9.3% Newar, 8.2% Tamang, 7.3% Magar, 4.3% Limbu, 3.8% Kami, 1.9% Damai/Dholi, 1.4% Gharti/Bhujel, 1.4% Thakuri, 1.2% Sarki, 0.6% Yakkha, 0.5% Sherpa, 0.4% Gurung, 0.3% Bantawa, 0.3% Majhi, 0.3% Musalman, 0.3% Tharu, 0.2% Halwai, 0.2% Teli, 0.2% other Terai, 0.1% Bengali, 0.1% Bhote, 0.1% Terai Brahmin, 0.1% Chamar/Harijan/Ram, 0.1% Chamling, 0.1% other Dalit, 0.1% Dom, 0.1% Hajjam/Thakur, 0.1% Kalwar, 0.1% Kayastha, 0.1% Marwadi, 0.1% Sanyasi/Dasnami, 0.1% Yadav and 0.5% others.

In terms of religion, 62.5% were Hindu, 23.6% Kirati, 11.2% Buddhist, 1.8% Christian, 0.3% Muslim, 0.1% Prakriti and 0.4% others.

In terms of literacy, 81.7% could read and write, 1.5% could only read and 16.8% could neither read nor write.

== Climate ==
Climate data for Dhankuta, elevation 1,192 m (3,911 ft), (1991–2020 normals, extremes 1987–2018)
Month	Jan	Feb	Mar	Apr	May	Jun	Jul	Aug	Sep	Oct	Nov	Dec	Year
Record high °C (°F)	26.7 (80.1)	30.6 (87.1)	31.8 (89.2)	33.0 (91.4)	33.6 (92.5)	32.6 (90.7)	33.0 (91.4)	33.4 (92.1)	33.2 (91.8)	32.5 (90.5)	32.0 (89.6)	28.8 (83.8)	33.6 (92.5)
Mean daily maximum °C (°F)	18.7 (65.7)	20.4 (68.7)	24.0 (75.2)	26.6 (79.9)	27.4 (81.3)	27.9 (82.2)	27.7 (81.9)	28.0 (82.4)	27.5 (81.5)	26.1 (79.0)	23.3 (73.9)	20.4 (68.7)	24.8 (76.6)
Daily mean °C (°F)	12.8 (55.0)	14.8 (58.6)	18.4 (65.1)	21.2 (70.2)	22.7 (72.9)	24.1 (75.4)	24.2 (75.6)	24.3 (75.7)	23.5 (74.3)	21.0 (69.8)	17.5 (63.5)	14.4 (57.9)	19.9 (67.8)
Mean daily minimum °C (°F)	6.9 (44.4)	9.2 (48.6)	12.8 (55.0)	15.8 (60.4)	18.0 (64.4)	20.3 (68.5)	20.7 (69.3)	20.5 (68.9)	19.4 (66.9)	15.8 (60.4)	11.7 (53.1)	8.4 (47.1)	15.0 (59.0)
Record low °C (°F)	2.0 (35.6)	2.4 (36.3)	5.0 (41.0)	8.5 (47.3)	11.3 (52.3)	14.3 (57.7)	15.7 (60.3)	16.2 (61.2)	13.0 (55.4)	8.7 (47.7)	6.5 (43.7)	2.9 (37.2)	2.0 (35.6)
Average precipitation mm (inches)	11.7 (0.46)	15.4 (0.61)	26.9 (1.06)	52.9 (2.08)	113.7 (4.48)	143.6 (5.65)	239.0 (9.41)	160.6 (6.32)	120.4 (4.74)	35.2 (1.39)	10.9 (0.43)	6.4 (0.25)	936.7 (36.88)
Average precipitation days (≥ 1.0 mm)	1.5	1.9	3.0	6.1	10.8	13.3	17.3	13.8	11.1	3.1	0.7	0.6	83.1
Source 1: World Meteorological Organization
Source 2: Department of Hydrology and Meteorology

== Present status ==
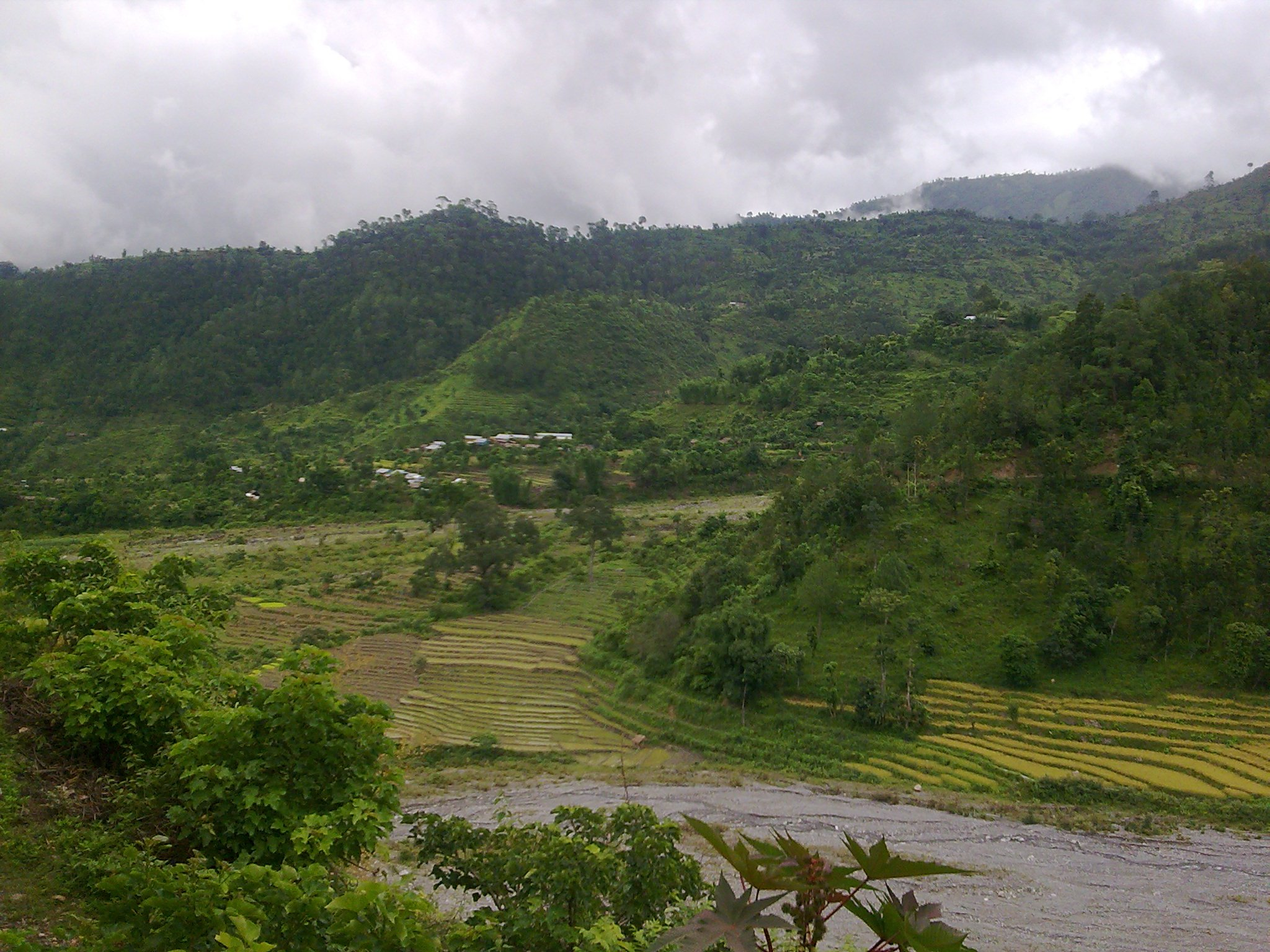
Dhankuta

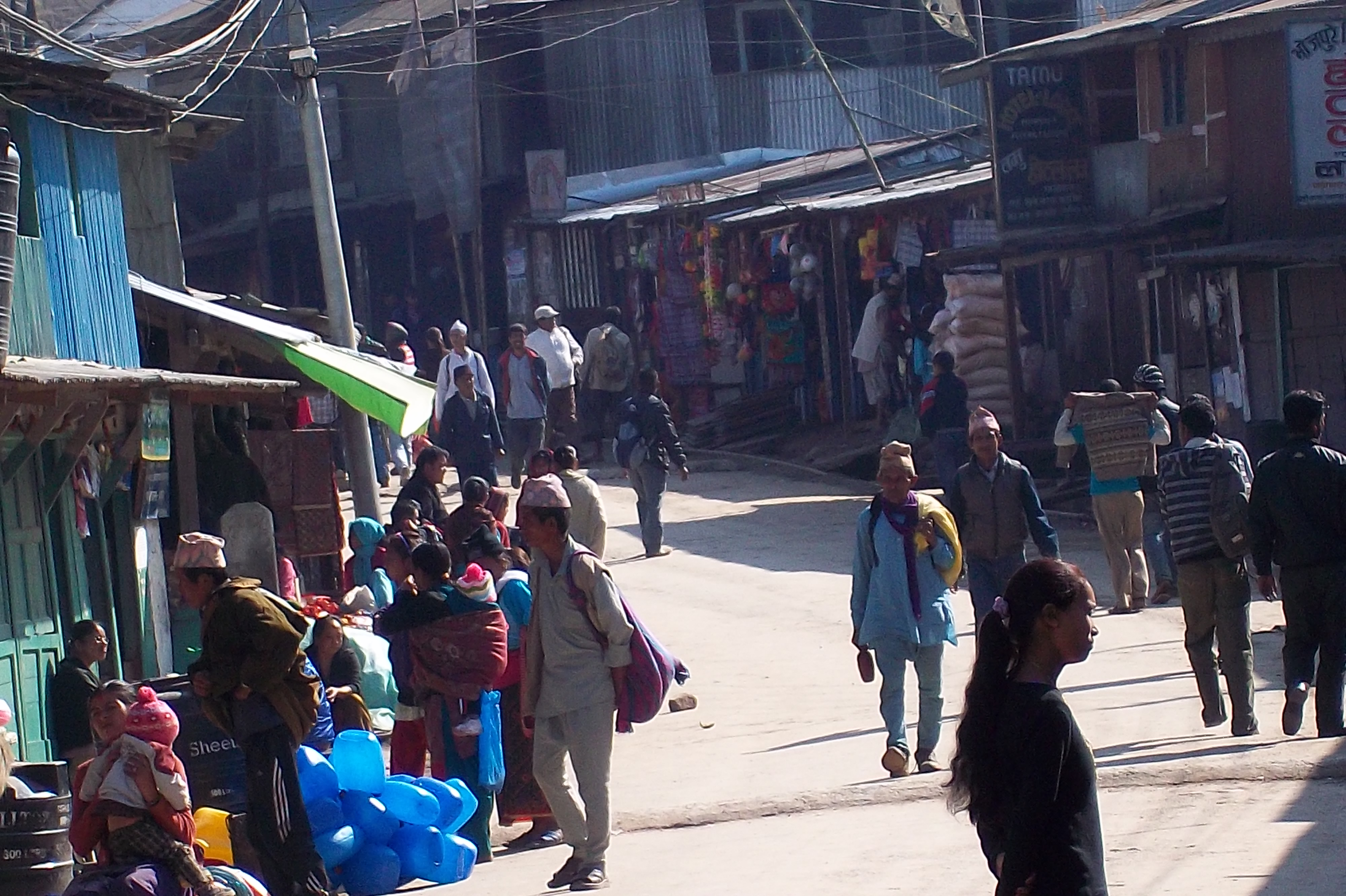
Pakhribas Bazaar

Dhankuta Bazaar, on the North-South Koshi Highway, is now the administrative headquarters for the Eastern Development Region, and is home to a number of offices for NGOs and aid agencies serving in the area. The large bazaar of Hile further up the road, is an important trading centre and major road head, serving the remote hinterlands of the Arun valley and Bhojpur. Villagers walk for many days from surrounding districts to trade in Hile and Dhankuta bazaars, although road building in the district may reduce the importance of these centers.

‘Nepal's cleanest city’ as proposed by The Kathmandu post.

== Vegetation ==
The vegetation zones in the district range from sub-tropical Sal forest along the Tamor and Arun rivers, and cooler temperate forests on some of the high ridges that mark the watershed between the two catchments. The altitude ranges from around 300m to 2500m. The majority of the population are involved in agriculture and crops include maize, rice and millet. Important cash crops include citrus fruits, cauliflower, cabbage, ginger, and in recent years, tea. A well-preserved forest (Rani Bhan – Queen's Forest) spreads along a ridge line on the northwest side of the village, with well-developed mature stands of rhododendron and pine trees.

== Health centres ==
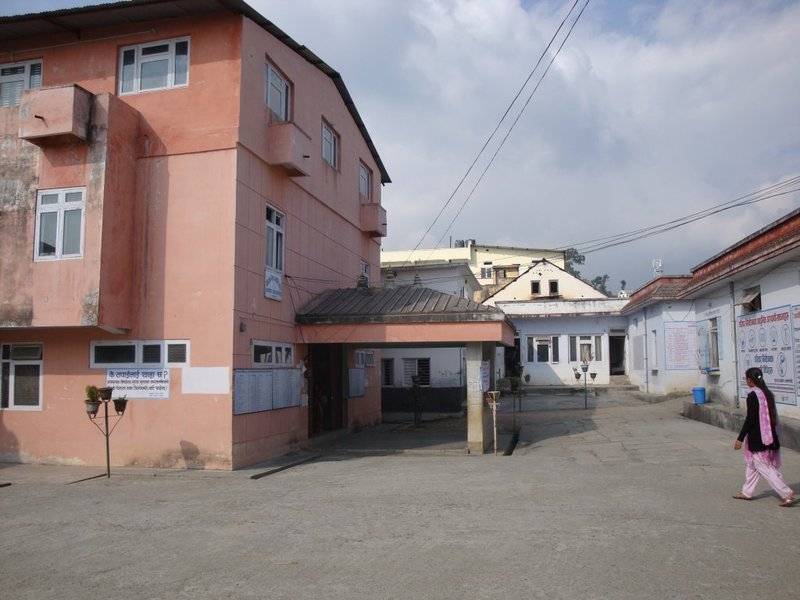
Dhankuta District Hospital

Dhankuta District Hospital is located off the main street at the south end of the town. The hospital has facilities like inpatient service, Ultrasonography and x-ray. Besides the government posted doctors, medical and dental intern doctors from BPKIHS are also posted there.

== Media ==
Radio Nepal has a regional station in Dhankuta which transmits various programs of mass interest. Likewise, Radio Lali Guransa (105.2 MHz), Radio Makalu Dhankuta (92.2 MHz), and Radio Dhankuta (106.2 MHz) are community radio stations transmitting local programmes.

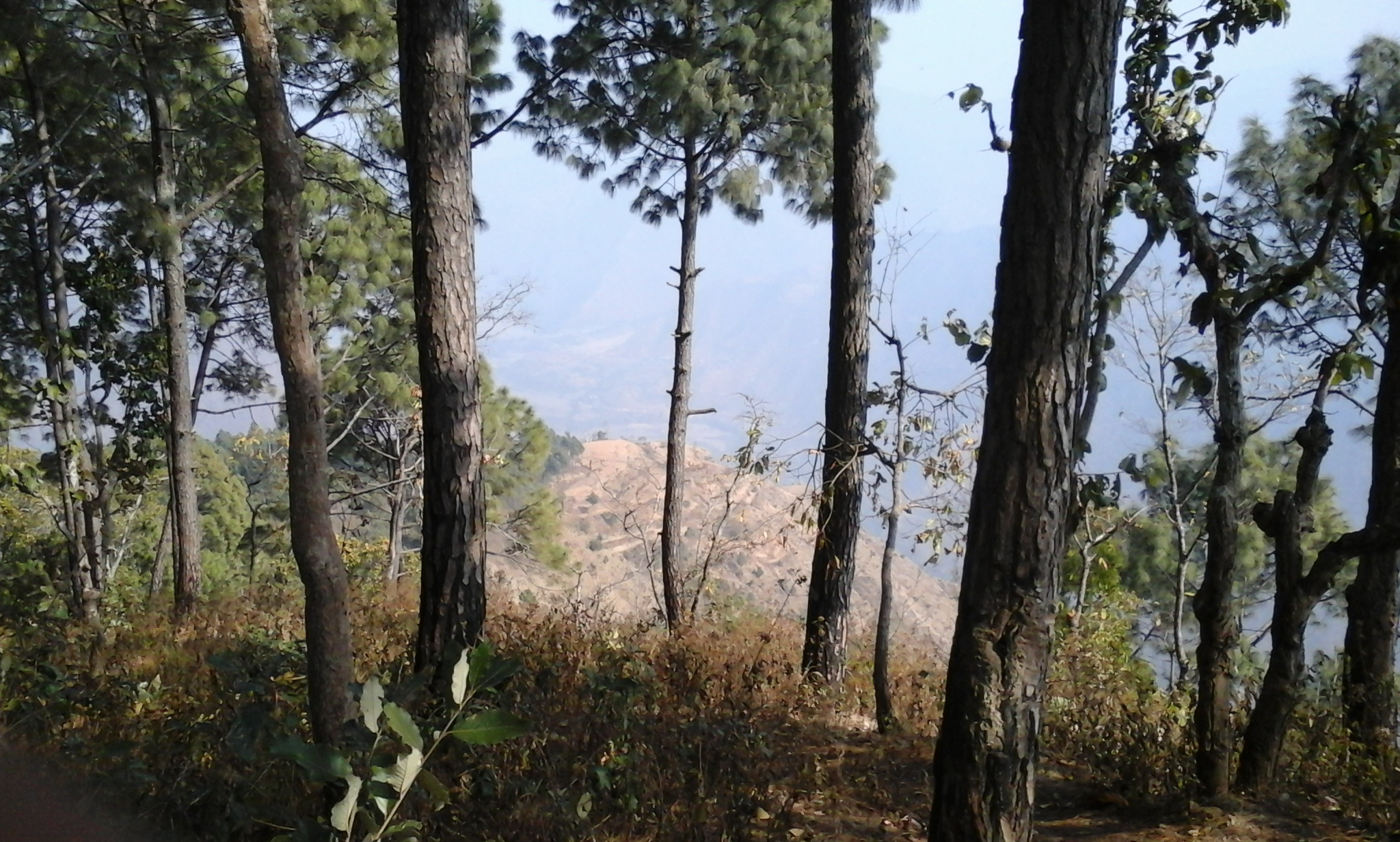
Pine trees
