= Tumlingtar Airport =

Nepalese airport

Tumlingtar Airport तुम्लिङ्ग्टार विमानस्थल
- IATA: TMI; ICAO: VNTR

Summary
- Airport type: Public
- Owner: Government of Nepal
- Operator: Civil Aviation Authority of Nepal
- Serves: Tumlingtar, Sankhuwasabha District, Nepal
- Elevation AMSL: 1,700 ft (520 m)
- Coordinates: 27°18′54″N 087°11′36″E
- Website: tumlingtar.caanepal.gov.np

Map
- Location of airport in Nepal

Runways
Direction	Length		Surface
Direction	m	ft	Surface
16/34	1,219	4,000	Asphalt

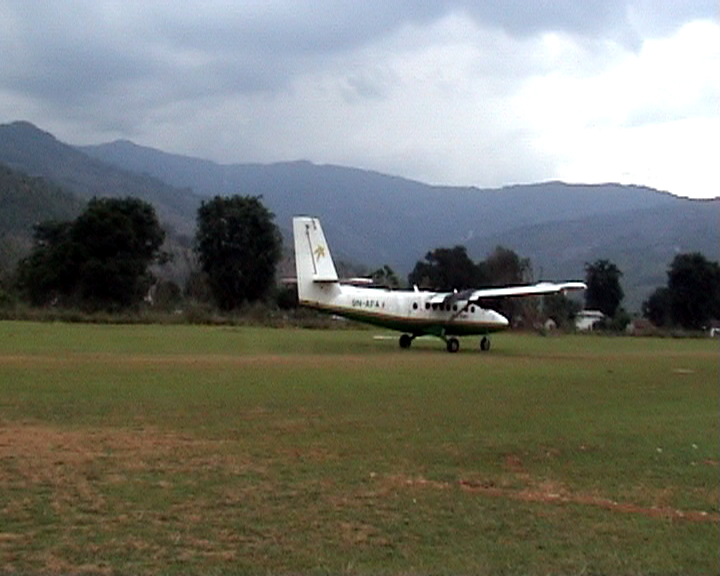
Tumlingtar airport

Tumlingtar Airport (IATA: TMI, ICAO: VNTR) is a domestic airport located in Tumlingtar serving Sankhuwasabha District, a district in Koshi Province in Nepal. It is the main tourist gateway to Makalu Barun National Park.

== History ==
This airport was first conceptualized to provide air transport facilities to inaccessible areas of Mechi, Koshi and Sagarmatha zones. In 1965, the land for Tumlingtar airport was acquired from the Kumals living in the Valley. Airport was initially built with a runway length of 3300 ft designed for DC-3s. A budget of NPR 2,60,000 was allocated for the fiscal year of 1971-72 for the purpose of construction of the fair weather airport. The airport started operations on 01 October, 1972.

== Facilities ==
The airport is situated at an elevation of 1,700 feet (518 m) above mean sea level. It has one runway which is 4,000 feet (1,200 m) in length.

== Airlines and destinations ==
Airlines	Destinations
Buddha Air	Biratnagar, Kathmandu
Guna Airlines	Kathmandu
Sita Air	Kathmandu
Summit Air	Kathmandu
Tara Air	Kathmandu
Yeti Airlines	Kathmandu

== Incidents and accidents ==
1. Cosmic Air DO-228 with Registration Number 9N AFS on 19 Nov 2000. There were no fatalities.
2. Yeti Airlines DHC - 6/300 with Registration Number 9N AEV on 05 April 2001. There were no fatalities.
