= Hatiya, Sankhuwasabha =

Hatiya हटिया
- Village development committee
- Location in Nepal
- Coordinates: 27.76°N 87.33°E
- Country: Nepal
- Zone: Kosi Zone
- District: Sankhuwasabha District

Population (1991)
  - Total: 2,824
- Time zone: UTC+5:45 (Nepal Time)
- Postal code: 56901
- Area code: 029

Hatiya is a village development committee in Sankhuwasabha District in the Kosi Zone of north-eastern Nepal. At the time of the 1991 Nepal census it had a population of 2824 people living in 585 individual households.
