= Khandbari Municipality =

District headquarters in Nepal

Khandbari Municipality खाँदबारी नगरपालिका
- Municipality
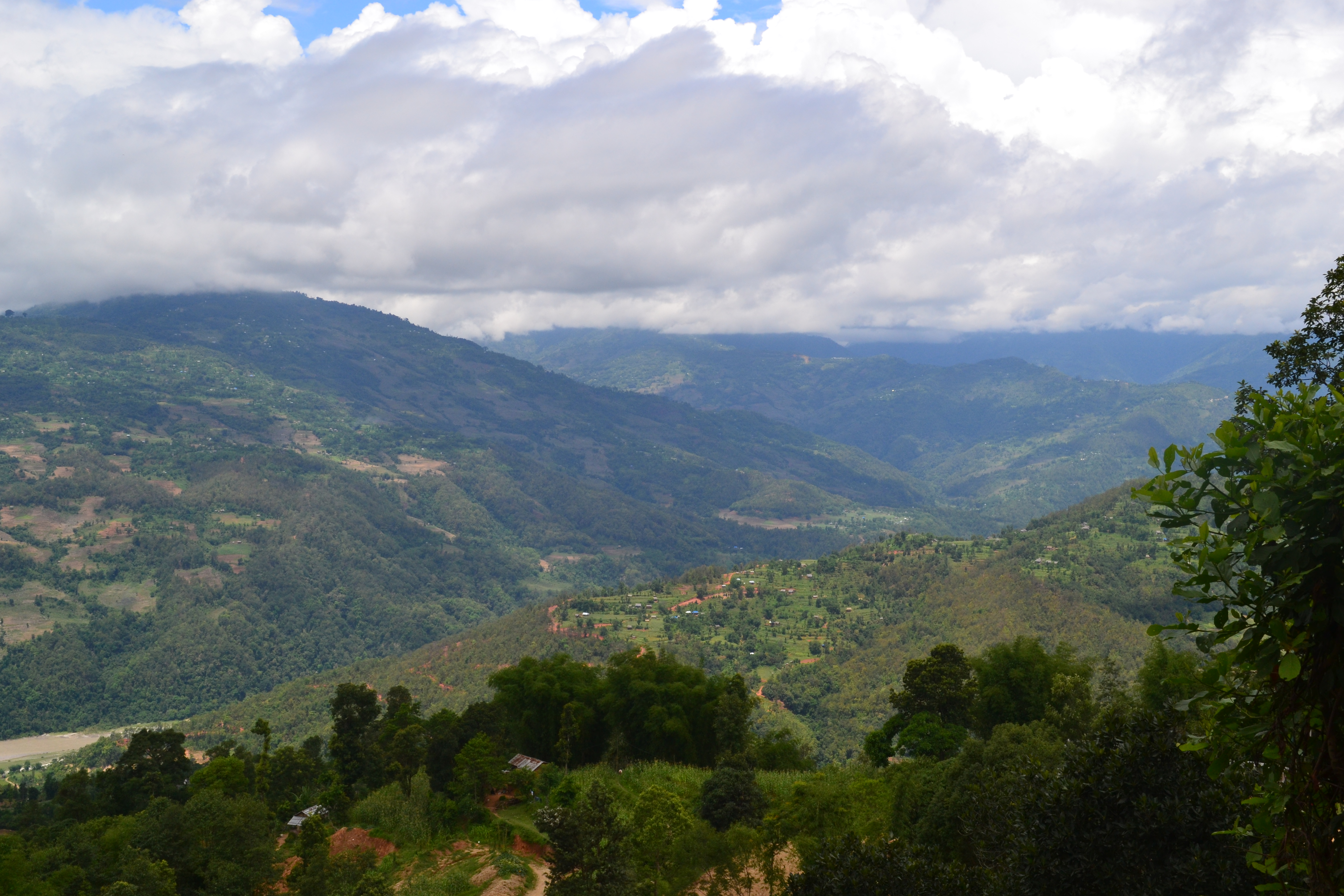
- Nickname: Aahil ko GAU
- Location in Nepal
- Coordinates: 27°22′N 87°13′E
- Country: Nepal
- Province: Koshi
- District: Sankhuwasabha

Government
  - Mayor: Mahesh Thapaliya (NC)
  - Deputy Mayor: Maheshwara Bajracharya (CPN (UML))

Population (2011)
  - Total: 26,301
- Time zone: UTC+5:45 (NST)
- Postal code: 56900
- Area code: 029
- Website: khandbarimun.gov.np

Khandbari (Nepali: खाँदबारी) is the district headquarters of Sankhuwasabha District in Koshi Province of north-eastern Nepal.

== Demographics ==
At the time of the 2011 Nepal census, Khandbari Municipality had a population of 31,534. Of these, 68.7% spoke Nepali, 5.5% Lohorung, 4.1% Tamang, 3.5% Sherpa, 3.1% Rai, 2.9% Kulung, 2.8% Magar, 2.1% Newar, 1.7% Gurung, 0.8% Yamphu, 0.4% Thulung, 0.3% Khaling, 0.3% Koi, 0.3% Limbu, 0.3% Maithili, 0.2% Bantawa, 0.2% Bhujel, 0.2% Chamling, 0.2% Dumi, 0.2% Kulung, 0.2% Majhi, 0.2% Mewahang, 0.2% Nachhiring, 0.2% Yakkha, 0.1% Bahing, 0.1% Bote, 0.1% Lhomi, 0.1% Sampang, 0.1% Tharu and 0.8% other languages as their first language.

In terms of ethnicity/caste, 19.4% were Chhetri, 18.2% Rai, 9.1% Newar, 7.9% Hill Brahmin, 7.5% Gurung, 7.2% Kami, 6.9% Tamang, 5.3% Magar, 3.1% Sherpa, 2.9% Damai/Dholi, 2.8% Kumal, 1.9% Sarki, 1.3% Kulung, 0.8% Limbu, 0.7% Bhote, 0.7% Sanyasi/Dasnami, 0.6% Gharti/Bhujel, 0.5% Lohorung, 0.5% Majhi, 0.3% Yakkha, 0.2% Thakuri, 0.1% Badi, 0.1% Bote, 0.1% Chamling, 0.1% Ghale, 0.1% Hajjam/Thakur, 0.1% Khaling, 0.1% Khawas, 0.1% Lhomi, 0.1% Marwadi, 0.1% Mewahang Bala, 0.1% Musalman, 0.1% Pattharkatta/Kushwadiya, 0.1% Samgpang, 0.1% Tharu, 0.1% Yadav, 0.1% Yamphu and 0.6% others.

In terms of religion, 62.3% were Hindu, 20.8% Buddhist, 14.5% Kirati, 1.4% Christian, 0.3% Prakriti, 0.1% Jain, 0.1% Muslim and 0.5% others.

In terms of literacy, 73.8% could read and write, 2.6% could only read and 23.6% could neither read nor write.

== The area ==
A road connects Khandbari directly south to Biratnagar and the Terai. Khandbari will be soon connected with Kimmathanka and Tibet. Khandbari is fastest growing city and most developed among Hilly Region. It has established itself as a trading center for people of sankhuwasabha and some parts of Bhojpur districts.

Khandbari's reputed schools include Himalayan Higher secondary school, Barun Secondary English School, Surya Higher Secondary Boarding School, Bagishwari Secondary School, Makalu English Boarding School and Sunshine English Secondary Boarding School.

Arun III Hydropower project is located nearby. Arun III Hydropower project is one of the major subjects that really matters to the residents.

A road has already been constructed that connects Khandbari directly to Biratnagar. Its border districts are Bhojpur, Solukhumbu, Taplejung, Terhathum and Dhankuta. The change in the political situation in the country has given much hope for the residents of the district for its rapid development.

The hospital in Khandbari is described as "comparatively well-equipped", and has received patients from surrounding areas arriving on foot or road and by chartered helicopters.

Khandbari is the main departure point for trekking to Mount Makalu (8463 meters), 5th highest peak in the world and Makalu Barun National Park. Arun Valley which is the deepest valley in the world is located here with an elevation of 435 meters (1,427 ft) from sea level.It is also famous among tourists because it is home to more than 800 different species of butterflies and over 650 species of birds. Among them one can also see spiny Babbler which is a species of bird only found in middle hills of Nepal.

People can reach Khandbari by road and air transport.There are number of public Buses connecting khandbari with Dharan which is around 6 hours drive and also there are direct buses from Kathmandu to khandbari. Air transport is provided through Tumlingtar Airport, which lies on the bank of Arun river. Every day, there are flights from Kathmandu and Biratnagar. The main town of khandbari is 13 km (8.1 mi) from the airport and can be reached by jeep, auto and van in around 20 minutes.

== Media ==
To promote local culture, Khandbari has five FM radio stations:

- Guransh FM 107.5 MHz
- Sunkhari FM 91.4 MHz
- Naya abhiyan FM 99.00 MHz
- Khadbari FM 105.8 MHz
- Arun FM also

== See also ==
- UN map of the municipalities of Sankhuwasabha District
