= Sankhuwasabha District =

Sankhuwasabha District सङ्खुवासभा जिल्ला
- District
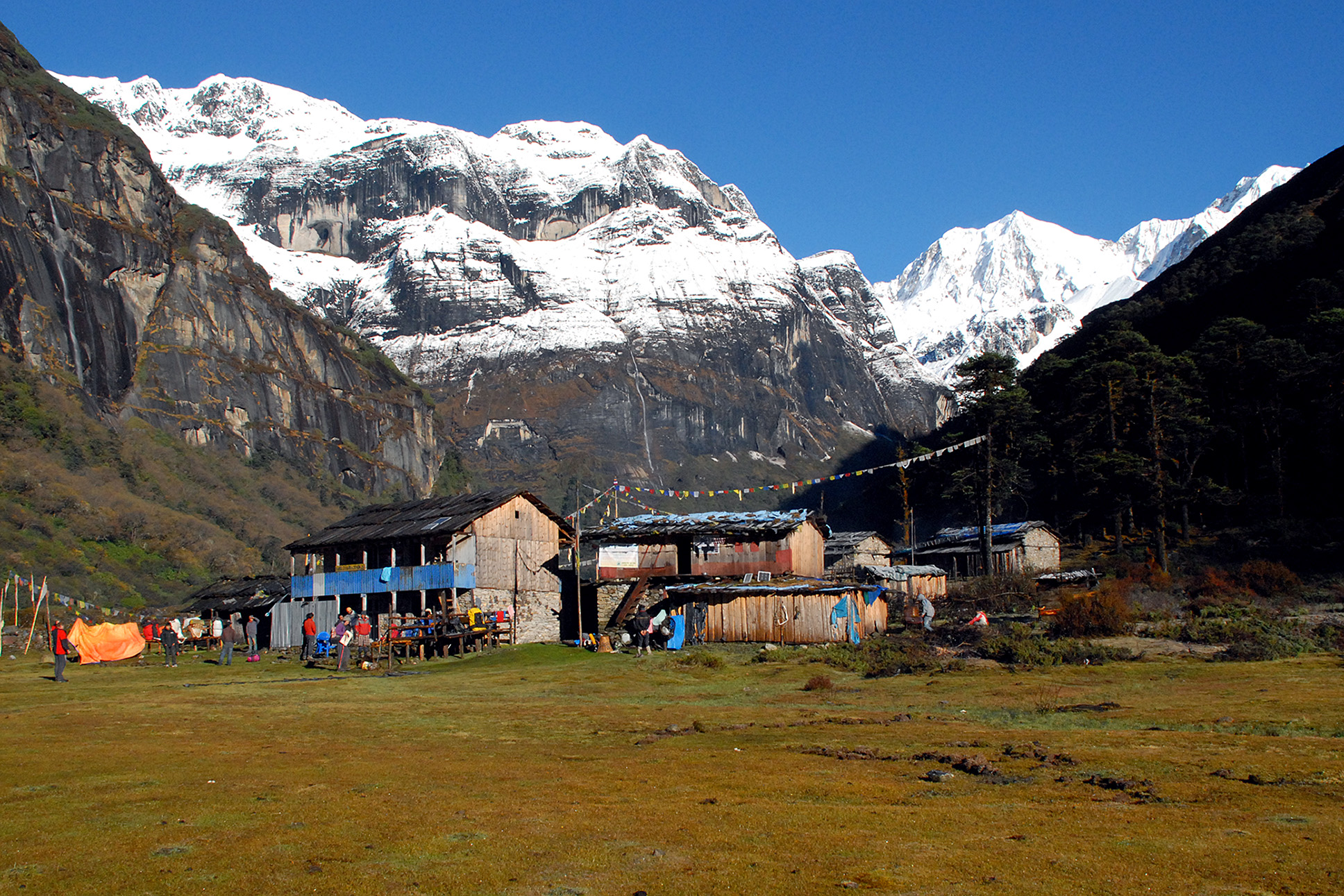
- Yangle Kharka, a place in Sankhuwasabha

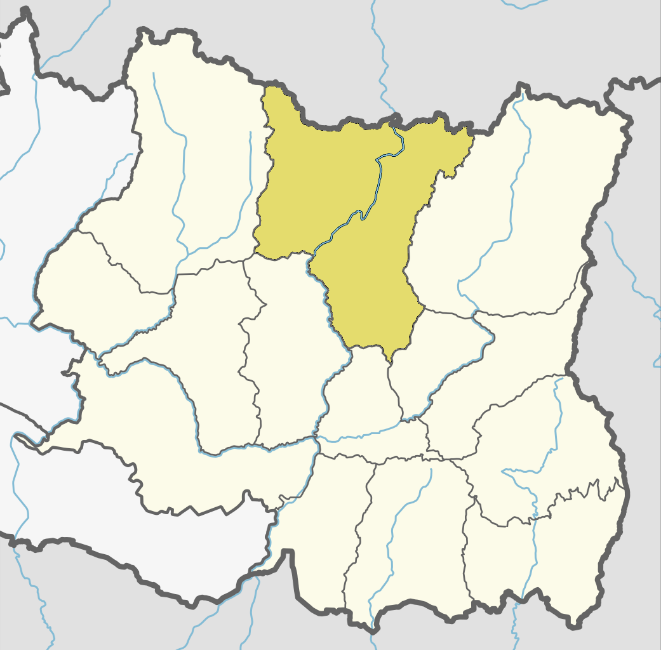
- Location of Sankhuwasabha in province
- Coordinates: 27°06′N 86°57′E to 27°55′N 87°40′E
- Country: Nepal
- Province: Koshi Province
- Established: 1962
- Admin HQ.: Khandbari
- Municipality: List: Urban; Chainpur; Dharmadevi; Khandbari; Madi; Panchkhapan; Rural; Bhotkhola; Chichila; Makalu; Savapokhari; Silichong

Government
  - Type: Coordination committee
  - Body: DCC, Sankhuwasabha
  - Head: Mahesh Thapaliya
  - Parliamentary constituencies: 1
  - Provincial constituencies: 2

Area
  - Total: 3,480 km^{2} (1,340 sq mi)
- Highest elevation: 8,463 m (27,766 ft)
- Lowest elevation: 457 m (1,499 ft)

Population (2021)
  - Total: 158,041
  - Density: 45.4/km^{2} (118/sq mi)
  - Households: 34,615

Demographics
  - Female ♀: 53%

Human Development Index
  - Income per capita (US dollars): $1,193
  - Poverty rate: 21%
  - Literacy: 79%
  - Life Expectancy: 68.4
- Time zone: UTC+05:45 (NPT)
- Postal Codes: 56900..., 56913
- Telephone Code: 029
- Main Language(s): Nepali, Yakkha, Kulung, Limbu
- Website: ddcsankhuwasabha.gov.np

Sankhuwasabha District (Nepali: सङ्खुवासभा जिल्ला) is one of 14 districts of Koshi Province of eastern Nepal. The district's area is 3,480 km^{2} with a population of 159,203 in 2001 and 158,742 in 2011. The administrative center is Khandbari.

Bordering districts are Bhojpur, Tehrathum, Dhankuta, Solukhumbu and Taplejung in Koshi Province. Tingri County of Shigatse Prefecture in the Tibet Autonomous Region of China borders to the north.

== Geography and climate ==
Climate Zone	Elevation Range	% of Area
Lower Tropical	below 300 meters (1,000 ft)	0.4%
Upper Tropical	300 to 1,000 meters 1,000 to 3,300 ft.	10.0%
Subtropical	1,000 to 2,000 meters 3,300 to 6,600 ft.	24.8%
Temperate	2,000 to 3,000 meters 6,400 to 9,800 ft.	23.3%
Subalpine	3,000 to 4,000 meters 9,800 to 13,100 ft.	12.8%
Alpine	4,000 to 5,000 meters 13,100 to 16,400 ft.	8.4%
Nival	above 5,000 meters	20.4%

The Arun River enters from Tibet at an elevation of about 3,500 meters (11,500 feet) and flows south across the district, forming one of the world's deepest valleys relative to 8,481 meter Makalu to the west and 8,586 meter Kangchenjunga to the east.

== Demographics ==
Historical population
Year	Pop.	±% p.a.
1981	129,414	—
1991	141,903	+0.93%
2001	159,203	+1.16%
2011	158,742	−0.03%
2021	158,041	−0.04%

At the 2021 Nepal census, Sankhuwasabha District had 39,118 households and a population of 158,041. 7.55% of the population was under 5 years of age. Sankhuawsabha had a literacy rate of 79.89% and a sex ratio of 986 females per 1,000 males. 108,038 (68.36%) lived in urban areas.

Ethnicity/caste of Sankhuwasabha district (2021)
1. Rai (17.3%)
2. Chhetri (11.3%)
3. Tamang (8.90%)
4. Kulung (6.70%)
5. Sherpa (6.30%)
6. Limbu (5.30%)
7. Gurung (5.20%)
8. Newar (4.54%)
9. Bahun (3.94%)
10. Yakkha (3.64%)
11. Magar (3.55%)
12. Other Hill Janjati (9.91%)
13. Other Khas Dalit (3.49%)
14. Others (3.00%)

Religion in Sankhuwasabha District (2021)
Religion	Percent
Hinduism	40.42%
Kirat Mundhum	28.84%
Buddhism	26.74%
Christianity	3.21%
Bon	0.45%
Other or not stated	0.34%

Religion: 40.42% were Hindu, 28.84% Kirati, 26.74% Buddhist, 3.21% Christian, 0.45% Bon and 0.07% others.

Languages of Sankhuwasabha district (2021)
1. Nepali (44.1%)
2. Tamang (9.62%)
3. Kulung (6.86%)
4. Sherpa (5.52%)
5. Limbu (4.83%)
6. Yamphu (3.87%)
7. Rai (3.10%)
8. Yakkha (3.09%)
9. Magar Dhut (2.83%)
10. Bhote (2.50%)
11. Gurung (2.30%)
12. Others (11.4%)

As their first language, 44.11% of the population spoke Nepali, 9.62% Tamang, 6.86% Kulung, 5.52% Sherpa, 4.83% Limbu, 3.87% Yamphu, 3.10% Rai, 3.09% Yakkha, 2.83% Magar Dhut, 2.50% Bhote and 2.30% Gurung as their first language. In 2011, 46.1% of the population spoke Nepali as their first language.

== Divisions ==
Sankhuwasabha District is divided into the following subdivisions:

Local Body	Nepali	Type	Population (2021)
Bhotkhola	भोटखोला	Rural municipality	6,438
Chainpur	चैनपुर	Municipality	26,799
Chichila	चिचिला	Rural municipality	6,477
Dharmadevi	धर्मदेवी	Municipality	16,053
Khandbari	खाँदबारी	Municipality	35,565
Madi	मादी	Municipality	13,273
Makalu	मकालु	Rural municipality	13,424
Panchkhapan	पाँचखपन	Municipality	16,348
Savapokhari	सभापोखरी	Rural municipality	9,970
Silichong	सिलीचोङ	Rural municipality	10,296

== See also ==
- Arun Valley
- Tumlingtar Airport
- khadbari
- Panchkhapan
- Chainpur
