= Ali Akbar Mikrani =

Former Chief Justice of Appellate Court, Member of Supreme Court Bar Association, Nepal.

Personal details
- Born: Rajdevi, Rautahat, Nepal
- Occupation: Advocate

Ali Akbar Mikrani, (Nepali: अलि अकबर मिकरानी), is a former Chief Justice of the Appellate Court of Nepal. Currently, he is a member of the Supreme Court Bar Association of Nepal. He also served as the chairman of the Central Hajj Committee of Nepal in 2013.

== Early life ==
He was born in Kadarbana village of Rajdevi municipality of Rautahat district in one of the well-established Muslim families of Nepal. He did his schooling in his village and later studied in India.

His grandfather Maula Bakhsh Mikrani 'Chaudhary' was a well-known social activist in Sarlahi and Rautahat districts, who was once jailed for six months at Nakhu, Kathmandu, during the rule of Rana Prime Minister Chandra Shumsher Jang Bahadur Rana.

The "Chaudhry" title was honored by that time of Rana government of Nepal to his grandfather Maula Bakhsh Mikrani in recognition of the bravery of his ancestor (Husaini Mikrani) who died fighting against the British invaders at Samanpur of Rautahat district. A large number of drinking water wells and public places still can be seen in Sarlahi and Rautahat districts made by Maula Bakhsh Chaudhry during his service.

His brother Ali Akhtar Mikrani was an architect engineer and social worker.

== International Participation ==
He was a representative of Nepal in December 2011 at a World Constitution and Parliament Association (WCPA) strategy meeting and participation in the International Conference of Chief Justices of the World (ICCJW). Which took place at the World Unity Convention Center of the City Montessori School of Lucknow. This was the first year that the call for a world parliament was unanimous among the more than 100 justices present at the Chief Justices Conference. He was an Honorary Sponsor of the Constitution for the Federation of Earth and member of the Collegium of World Judges.

== National Participation ==
The fifth and last regional-level consultative workshop on the draft of Strategic Plan ( 2011–13) of the National Human Rights Commission of Nepal was held in Janakpur on April 21, 2011. The programme was presided over by the Officiating Regional Director Buddha Narayan Sahani Kewat and the programme was chaired by Honorable Ali Akbar Mikrani, Chief Judge of Appellate Court as the Guest of Honour.

On 31 October 2009 a seminar on Initiative for State-building and Constitutional Dynamics held by Friedrich-Ebert-Stiftung (FES), Nepal, in Rajbiraj. he was Chief guest of the seminar and underlined the need of consensus among political parties in his speech. At that time he was the Chief Justice of Appellate Court of Rajbiraj. He expressed doubt over the drafting of the Constitution because of the power struggle of leaders. He said that on federalism even German and Indian scholars could not satisfy him. Leadership's greed for power has weakened the state. It is remittance that is helping the Nepalese economy. Due to the open border with India people are sustaining their lives. The success of the constitution of one state cannot be an example for another.

In 2013, he successfully manage the Hajj for the Nepali Muslims pilgrims for Saudi Arabia as a chairman of the Central Hajj Committee of Nepal (CHC), the government body that manages the Hajj for the Nepali Muslims.
