= Ali Akhtar Mikrani =

Er. Ali Akhtar Mikrani
- ई. अलि अखतर मिकरानी
- Born: 1956 (age 69–70); Gaur, Rautahat District, Nepal
- Died: 10 May 2021 (aged 64–65); Grande International Hospital, Kathmandu
- Education: Master
- Alma mater: National Institute of Technology
- Occupation: Consultant Engineer
- Employer: Prime Minister Advisor of Nepal
- Relatives: Ali Akbar Mikrani

Er. Ali Akhtar Mikrani (Nepali: ई.अलि अखतर मिकरानी, born 1956) was an architecture engineer and social worker in Nepal.

He worked as an advisor to the Prime Minister of Nepal during the tenure of Prime Minister Madhav Kumar Nepal from May 2009 to February 2011. He also worked as a member of the construction and planning of Kathmandu Valley under the Government of Nepal.

He was recommended for the post of ambassador of Nepal to Saudi Arabia during the K.P.Oli government but later withdrawn due to the fall-down of the government.

== Early life ==
He was born in Kattarban village of Rajdevi Municipality of Rautahat district in the year 1956 in one of the well-established Muslim families of Nepal. He did his schooling in his village and later studied in India at the renowned engineering institute named "National Institute of Technology, Rourkela".

His grandfather Maula Bakhsh Mikrani 'Chaudhary' was also a well-known social activist in the area of Sarlahi and Rautahat districts, who once been jailed for six months at Nakhu Kathmandu at the time of Rana Prime Minister Chandra Shumsher Jang Bahadur Rana.

The "Chaudhry" title was honoured by the Rana government of Nepal to his grandfather Maula Bakhsh Mikrani in recognition of the bravery of his ancestor (Husaini Mikrani) who died fighting with British invader at Samanpur of Rautahat District. A large number of drinking water wells and public places still can be seen in Sarlahi and Rautahat districts made by Maula Bakhsh Chaudhry during his service.

His brother Ali Akbar Mikrani is a Former Chief Justice of the Appellate Court of Nepal.

== Social Activities ==
He visited Saudi Arabia during his tenure as prime minister's advisor where he got recognition for his work for Nepalese migrant workers in Saudi Arabia. He also worked as a consultant of Hajj Committee of Nepal in 2015.

== Political activities ==
He was aligned with the Communist Party of Nepal (Unified Marxist–Leninist) for more than decades. He also served as secretary of the UML Aetihad committee.

== Illness and death ==
He tested positive for coronavirus on 24 April 2021 and died on 11 May 2021 due to pneumonia and organ failure at Grande International Hospital, Kathmandu. The Grande International Hospital was blamed by his kins for negligence and miss management in his treatment.
