= Ghanendra Basnet =

Nepalese communist politician (1952–2026)

Ghanendra Basnet (Nepali: घनेन्द्र बस्नेत; 10 October 1952 – 30 September 2026) was a Nepalese communist politician. He was one of the key leaders of the Jhapa movement in the 1970s. Basnet is known as an organiser of the 1977 Nakkhu jail break. After the introduction of parliamentary democracy, he was elected twice to parliament in the 1990s.

== Childhood and youth ==
Ghanendra Basnet was born on 10 October 1952 in Kulung Kamletar village, Bhojpur District. Basnet spent his childhood and early youth in his native village. His older cousin Bhim Basnet was involved in leftist politics in the Kulung Kamletar, and the two cousins studied literature such as The Red Book and Peking Review distributed by the Chinese embassy and smuggled into the village. Ghanendra Basnet passed his SLC Examination in 1970, after which Bhim and Ghanendra moved to Birgunj to pursue college studies there. Ghanendra emerged as a prominent student movement leader at Birgunj Campus.

== Jhapa movement ==
Basnet would become one of the key leaders of the Jhapa movement. In October 1972, after spending the Dashain holidays in Kulung Kamletar, Basnet travelled to Jhapa District – the epicentre of an ongoing revolutionary uprising. At a meeting held in Budhabare in Jhapa District, C.P. Mainali inducted Basnet into the movement by marking a red tika on his forehead. Basnet was included as a member of the Jhapa District Committee of the Coordination Centre. Later, the convention of the Jhapa District Committee appointed Basnet to head the district-level Red Guards.

== Years in prison and Nakkhu jail break ==
Basnet was arrested, and taken to Birgunj Jail. His family was not informed about his arrest; on the contrary, the Panchayat regime sent a letter to his family claiming that he had died. He was later moved to the Central Jail. Basnet took part in political activities in prison, along with other political prisoners Basnet organized protests against segregation of prisoners and demanding prisoners be able to cook their own meals. After Naresh Kharel was shifted to another prison, Basnet became the secretary of the Central Jail Committee (a grouping that also included C.P. Mainali and R.K. Mainali).

On 25 March 1977 Basnet took part in a prison break at Nakkhu Jail, as the prisoners had dug a tunnel out. Fifteen political prisoners managed to escape, albeit five were re-arrested. Basnet was re-arrested after four days in the Pathlaiya jungle. After his re-arrest Basnet was held in solitary confinement for over two years, during which his health worsened. Apart from the four days after the jail break, Basnet spent a continuous 16 years and three months in prison.

== Parliamentarian ==
Basnet was released from jail after the fall of the Panchayat regime. When the Communist Party of Nepal (Unified Marxist-Leninist) was formed, Basnet became a Central Committee member of the party. He won the Sankhuwasabha constituency No. 2 in the 1991 parliamentary election, running as a CPN(UML) candidate. He received 18,793 votes (63.21%), defeating his nearest rival by 8,980 votes. In the 1999 parliamentary election, he won Bhojpur constituency No. 1 with 15,443 votes, defeating the Nepali Congress candidate by a narrower margin of 838 votes.

== Later years ==
When the Nepal Communist Party was formed, Basnet was a Central Committee member of the party and served as the Morang District in-charge. He sided with the Communist Party of Nepal (Unified Socialist), after the split in the Nepal Communist Party and the resurgence of the CPN(UML). He was named in-charge for Province 1 of the new party.

In the aftermath of the Tenth General Convention of the Communist Party of Nepal (Unified Socialist) in mid-2024, Basnet stood as a candidate for the post of Senior Vice Chairman of the party. On 27 August 2024 Basnet withdrew his candidacy for the post, and Rajendra Pandey was elected unopposed to the post. When the Communist Party of Nepal (Unified Socialist) reshuffled its leadership in December 2024, Basnet was appointed to head the State Affairs Department of the party. Basnet opposed the merger of the Communist Party of Nepal (Unified Socialist) with the Communist Party of Nepal (Maoist Centre) in 2025. He became a senior leader of the Unified Socialist Reorganization Campaign of Ghanashyam Bhusal.

Basnet received the Pushpalal National Award. He served as the vice president of the Former Parliamentarians' Forum of Nepal.

Basnet died on 30 September 2026 whilst receiving treatment at Bhaktapur Cancer Hospital. Basnet had suffered from lung cancer for a half a year. Various political leaders from different parties paid their respects to Basnet. He was eulogized as having been a 'living legend' of the communist movement in the country. CPN(UML) chairman K.P. Sharma Oli draped Basnet's body with the party flag, and presented a bouquet of flowers. On 1 October 2026 the National Assembly passed a condolence resolution and held a minute's silence in honour of Basnet.
