= National Ethics Policy (Nepal) =

National Ethics Policy (Nepali: राष्ट्रिय सदाचार नीति, २०८३) is a policy framework introduced by the Government of Nepal to improve ethical conduct and strengthen transparency within public institutions. The policy was approved by the Council of Ministers in 2083 BS (2023 AD) as part of a broader effort to address recurring concerns about administrative irregularities and weak oversight in the country.

The policy outlines a set of principles and operational guidelines intended to promote integrity among public officials and political actors. It includes measures such as mandatory asset declaration, rules for managing conflicts of interest, and requirements for financial transparency in political parties and organizations involved in public service delivery. These provisions were developed in response to long‑standing public criticism regarding misuse of authority and gaps in accountability mechanisms.

Implementation of the policy is coordinated through several government bodies, including the Office of the Prime Minister and Council of Ministers and ministry‑level integrity units. The policy also encourages the use of digital systems to reduce procedural irregularities and improve monitoring. Although the document itself does not specify penalties, violations are handled under existing laws such as the Corruption Prevention Act and the Civil Service Act.

Observers have noted that the policy represents a significant step toward improving governance in Nepal, but its effectiveness depends largely on consistent enforcement and political commitment. Some analysts have pointed out that previous reform initiatives faced challenges due to limited institutional capacity and interference from influential groups, and similar concerns have been raised regarding this policy as well.

== See also ==
- Corruption in Nepal
- Government of Nepal
- Good governance
