= List of prisons in Nepal =

This is a list of prisons in Nepal.

== Koshi Province ==
- Bhojpur Jail
- Morang Jail
- Dhankuta jail
- Dolakha Jail
- Ilam Jail
- Jhapa Jail
- Jhumka regional prison
- Okhaldhunga Jail
- Panchthar Jail
- Sankhuwasabha Jail
- Solukhumbu Jail
- Taplejung Jail
- Terhathum Jail
- Udayapur Jail

== Madhesh Province ==
- Mahottari Jail
- Parsa Jail
- Rautahat Jail(Dewahi Gonahi municipality)
- Sarlahi Jail
- Saptari Jail
- Siraha Jail

== Bagmati province ==
- Bhimphedi Jail
- Central Jail (Kathmandu)
- Chitwan Jail
- Dhading Jail
- Jagannath Dewal
- Kavrepalanchowk Jail
- Makwanpur Jail
- Nakhu Jail (Estd 2007 BS)
- Nuwakot Jail
- Ramechhap Jail
- Rasuwa Jail
- Sindhuli Jail
- Sindhupalchowk Jail

== Gandaki province ==
- Gorkha Jail
- Baglung Jail
- Kaski Jail
- Lamjung Jail
- Manang Jail
- Syangja Jail
- Tanahun Jail
- Mustang Jail

== Lumbini province ==
- Arghakhanchi Jail
- Ghorahi Jail
- Gulmi Jail
- Kapilvastu Jail
- Myagdi Jail
- Nawalparasi Jail
- Palpa Jail
- Parbat Jail
- Rupandehi Jail
- Tulsipur Jail

== Karnali Province ==
- Banke Jail
- Bardiya jail
- Dailekh Ja
- Jajarkot Jail
- Jumla jail
- Kalikot Jail
- Pyuthan Jail
- Rolpa Jail
- Rukum Jail
- Salyan Jail
- Surkhet Jail

== Sudurpashchim Province ==
- Baitadi Jail
- Dadeldhura Jail
- Darchula Jail
- Achham Jail
- Kailali Jail
- Kanchanpur Jail
- Doti Jail

== See also ==
- List of foreign criminals in Nepal
