= Censorship in Nepal =

Censorship in Nepal consists of suppression on the expression of political opinion, religious aspect, and obscenity. The Constitution of Nepal guarantees the fundamental rights of citizens, including the freedom of expression. The right to freedom of expression includes the freedom of opinion and thought no matter what a source is. As the Constitution has been developed to push forward democracy, inconsistencies of the Constitution reform create different meanings of prohibiting censorship. The 2004, 2009, and 2015 Constitution are infamous with the restrictions of the rights which are obscure and open for misinterpretation compared to the Constitution announced in 1990.

== Media Censorship ==
The Constitution of Nepal guarantees the freedom of expression in media; media should not be subject to direct censorship. In 2012, International Mission acknowledges that the progressive media policy in Nepal to follow the constitution is necessary, as the Ministry of Information and Communications (Nepal) has published a draft Media Policy on its website. The media, however, were still limited only in capital, and it was hard to find the access outside the capital. Moreover, the government approved the Online Media Directives 2015 without any hesitation, while it provides censorship or shut-down online media within their contents, which denies the Constitution. As a result, the government-owned media disseminate information to public and causes the disbelief in mass media.

=== Press ===
According to the Article 115 of the 1990 Constitution, any form of censorship was outlawed, and a free press was strongly guaranteed with announcement of parliamentary democracy. Unfortunately, press media was heavily censored in 2001 and 2002 by the king Gyanendra Bir Bikram Shah Dev, unlike he promised. The king implemented Clause 1 of Article 115 of the 1990 constitution to suspend the guaranteed freedom of thought and expression that banned censorship. As a result, in 2002, hundreds or maybe even thousands of journalists who indicated their political opinions on the media were arrested, beaten, or detained, and some of them were killed to fight for freedom of expression guaranteed in the constitution.

In 2006, massive protests occurred to force the king to realize parliamentary democracy, and this resulted in returning some of fundamental press freedom. Until now, the government has not solved instability of censorship of media and creates norms and fragile democratic structures. The Nepal Press Council and the Federation of Nepali Journalists (FNJ) have a code of conduct, but it lacks effective systems and mechanisms, and it needs more support from media stakeholders.

=== Internet ===
The government controls the Internet in Nepal. The international internet connections were cut off by the government due to the martial law declared by the King in 2005. Self censorship can be forced on internet content by intimidation as happened in the case of a satirical folk song Lutna Sake Lut, which was taken down from YouTube by the author amid threats to his person.

On November 13, 2023, it was announced that TikTok would be banned for its "disruption of the social harmony".

In September 2025, the Nepalese government announced a ban on 26 major social media platforms, including YouTube, Instagram, Facebook, WhatsApp and more. Authorities said these platforms failed to register themselves with the government and appoint local representatives to monitor content and abide by the 2023 rules for regulating social media. The ban sparked demonstrations where protestors clashed with police, leaving "at least 19 dead". Nepal's home minister, Ramesh Lekhak, resigned following the event and the government said it would form a committee to investigate the violence. Prime Minister Khadga Prasad Sharma Oli also resigned following the events. On September 9, 2025, the government lifted the social media ban.

=== Film ===
The Film Censor Board was established in 1951 to work as a machinery of state control. It mainly controls sex, violence, and politics in film and commands to cut off the scenes harmful to the society and the state. It also discredits the certification of prohibited movies if the whole cinema is assumed to be inappropriate for the state and society. For those of sexual scenes in movies are usually removed in chunks, and this censorship often causes low cinematic values with clumsiness and lacks completeness of movies.

== Political censorship ==
Any forms of publications that contain political thoughts or opinions are censored by the government. Police directly suppress Nepalese journalists and make them self-censored when journalists criticize politicians or politics on the newspapers. For example, because a journalist wrote an article about Nepalese politician on the newspapers, police gathered all the newspapers and burned all of them in front of journalists. Moreover, the government was going to arrest journalists who made the publications of Political cartoon that depicted the constitutional monarchy as a dead animal to indicate the Press Act as completely inconsistent and violating the freedom of expression of media guaranteed in the constitution.

== Religious censorship ==
Nepal had an official religion as Hinduism until the government declared democracy of state in 2006. After that, the constitution has prohibited any acts leading to conversions from one religion to another. Nevertheless, the government controls the religious expression or defamation, especially when it publicly dissents Hinduism or does not comply rules of it. For instance, in 2010, the song of Komal Oli was banned from Nepal Television, because it was against Hindu sentiments. Also, in 2012, paintings of Hindu gods and goddesses Manish Harijan depicted in super hero costumes and displayed in the Siddhartha Art Gallery were considered as offensive to Hinduism, and the police shut down the gallery.
