= Hem Kumar Rai =

Nepali politician

- हेम कुमार राई

Member of Parliament, Pratinidhi Sabha
- In office 4 March 2018 – 18 September 2022
- Succeeded by: Manbir Rai
- Constituency: Solukhumbu 1

Personal details
- Born: 30 December 1983 (age 42)
- Party: CPN (Maoist Centre)

Hem kumar Rai is a Nepali politician and a former member of the House of Representatives of the federal parliament of Nepal. He is also a member of the parliamentary Finance Committee. He won his seat from the Solukhumbu-1 constituency as a candidate from Communist Party of Nepal (Maoist Center) of the left alliance, by defeating his nearest rival Bal Bahadur KC of Nepali Congress. He garnered 20,747 votes to KC's 17,294. After his party united with CPN UML to form Nepal Communist Party (NCP), he became the new party's "co-incharge" for Solukhumbu district.
