= Rajdevi Temple (Gaur) =

Hindu temple in Nepal

Rajdevi Mandir
- राजदेवी मन्दिर
- Location within Nepal

Religion
- Affiliation: Hinduism
- District: Rautahat
- Festival: Bada Dashain

Location
- Location: Rajdevi
- State: Madhesh Province
- Country: Nepal
- Interactive map of Rajdevi Mandir
- Coordinates: 26.7683°N 85.3158°E

Architecture
- Completed: earliest reference by Aayush Mishra's Article in the 1604 During Pratav Malla Period.

Specifications
- Temple: 3
- Elevation: 76 m (249 ft)

Website
- rajdevimandirrautahatnepal.blogspot.com

Rajdevi Temple (Nepali language:राजदेवी मन्दिर) is a famous Hindu temple in Central Nepal. The primary deity is Rajdevi. It is situated in the Rajdevi Municipality, Gaur, Rautahat. This Temple is a main attraction for Rautahat and Indian Pilgrims. People are likely to come here in Bada Dashain.
