= Solukhumbu 1 =

Parliamentary constituency in Nepal

- Parliamentary constituency
- Solukhumbu 1 in Koshi Province
- Province: Koshi
- District: Solukhumbu

Current constituency
- Created: 1991
- Party: Nepali Congress
- Member of Parliament: Prakash Singh Karki
- Member of the Provincial Assembly: Uttam Kumar Basnet, CPN (UML)
- Member of the Provincial Assembly: Buddhi Kumar Rajbhandari, CPN (UML)

Solukhumbu 1 is the parliamentary constituency of Solukhumbu District in Nepal. This constituency came into existence on the Constituency Delimitation Commission (CDC) report submitted on 31 August 2017.

== Incorporated areas ==
Solukhumbu 1 incorporates the entirety of Solukhumbu District.

== Assembly segments ==
It encompasses the following Province No. 1 Provincial Assembly segment

- Solukhumbu 1(A)
- Solukhumbu 1(B)

== Members of Parliament ==
=== Parliament/Constituent Assembly ===
Election	Member	Party
1991	Bal Bahadur K.C.	Nepali Congress
2008	Gopal Kirati	CPN (Maoist)
January 2009	Gopal Kirati	UCPN (Maoist)
2013	Bal Bahadur K.C.	Nepali Congress
2017	Hem Kumar Rai	CPN (Maoist Centre)
May 2018	Hem Kumar Rai	Nepal Communist Party
2022	Manbir Rai	CPN (UML)
2026	Prakash Singh Karki	Nepali Congress

=== Provincial Assembly ===
==== 1(A ====
Election	Member	Party
2017	Uttam Kumar Basnet	CPN (Unified Marxist-Leninist)
May 2018	Uttam Kumar Basnet	Nepal Communist Party

==== 1(B) ====
Election	Member	Party
2017	Buddhi Kumar Rajbhandari	CPN (Unified Marxist-Leninist)
May 2018	Buddhi Kumar Rajbhandari	Nepal Communist Party

== Election results ==
=== Election in the 2020s ===
==== 2026 general election ====
Candidate	Party	Votes	%
Prakash Singh Karki	Congress	13,166	34.14
Ashim Rai	NCP	9,414	24.41
Kalpana Rai	CPN (UML)	8,228	21.33
Rishi Dhan Thulung Rai	RSP	3,642	9.44
Biyas Rai	SSP	3,363	8.72
Pemba Chiri Sherpa	Ujyaalo Nepal Party	278	0.72
Lakpa Sherpa	Janata Samajwadi Party Nepal	203	0.53
Rajendra Basnet	Rastriya Prajatantra Party	157	0.41
Gunaraj F. Bhattarai	Aam Janata Party	42	0.11
Others		73	0.19
Total		38,566	100.00
Valid votes		38,566	93.15
Invalid/blank votes		2,835	6.85
Total votes		41,401	100.00
Registered voters/turnout		85,515	48.41
Majority		3,752	
Congress gain			

==== 2022 general election ====
Candidate	Party	Votes	%
Manbir Rai	CPN (UML)	19,324	51.11
Bal Bahadur K.C.	Nepali Congress	16,545	43.76
Others		1,941	5.13
Total		37,810	100.00
Majority		2,779	
CPN (UML) gain			

=== Election in the 2010s ===
==== 2017 legislative elections ====
Party	Candidate	Votes
CPN (Maoist Centre)	Hem Kumar Rai	20,747
Nepali Congress	Bal Bahadur K.C.	17,294
Others		1,504
Invalid votes		1,886
Result	Maoist Centre gain	
Source: Election Commission

==== 2017 Nepalese provincial elections ====
===== 1(A) =====
Party	Candidate	Votes
CPN (Unified Marxist–Leninist)	Uttam Kumar Basnet	10,585
Nepali Congress	Prakash Singh Karki	8,922
Naya Shakti Party, Nepal	Deepak Khadka	1,156
Others		427
Invalid votes		847
Result	CPN (UML) gain	
Source: Election Commission

===== 1(B) =====
Party	Candidate	Votes
CPN (Unified Marxist–Leninist)	Buddhi Kumar Rajbandari	10,387
Nepali Congress	Ang Gelu Sherpa	7,929
Others		425
Invalid votes		743
Result	CPN (UML) gain	
Source: Election Commission

==== 2013 Constituent Assembly election ====
Party	Candidate	Votes
Nepali Congress	Bal Bahadur K.C.	12,464
CPN (Unified Marxist–Leninist)	Ang Nima Lama Sherpa	10,104
UCPN (Maoist)	Gimbu Sherpa	6,269
Independent	Sonam Chiring Sherpa	3,560
CPN (Marxist–Leninist)	Bishnu Prasad Bastola	1,165
Others		1,572
Result	Congress gain	
Source: NepalNews

=== Election in the 2000s ===
==== 2008 Constituent Assembly election ====
Party	Candidate	Votes
CPN (Maoist)	Gopal Kirati	19,095
Nepali Congress	Bal Bahadur K.C.	9,434
CPN (Unified Marxist–Leninist)	Buddhi Kumar Rajbhandari	6,798
CPN (Marxist–Leninist)	Bishnu Prasad Bastola	2,695
Others		2,379
Invalid votes		1,899
Result	Maoist gain	
Source: Election Commission

=== Election in the 1990s ===
==== 1999 legislative elections ====
Party	Candidate	Votes
Nepali Congress	Bal Bahadur K.C.	21,613
CPN (Unified Marxist–Leninist)	Juddha Bahadur Gurung	14,794
Rastriya Prajatantra Party (Chand)	Devendra Bikram Mahat	6,954
Others		1,482
Invalid Votes		854
Result	Congress hold	
Source: Election Commission

==== 1994 legislative elections ====
Party	Candidate	Votes
Nepali Congress	Bal Bahadur K.C.	11,507
Rastriya Prajatantra Party	Sonam Chiring	11,340
CPN (Unified Marxist–Leninist)	Ang Igel Sherap	7,661
Independent	Gokarna Rai	4,363
Others		752
Result	Congress hold	
Source: Election Commission

==== 1991 legislative elections ====
Party	Candidate	Votes
Nepali Congress	Bal Bahadur K.C.	18,871
CPN (Unified Marxist–Leninist)	Aang Igale Sherpa	10,672
Result	Congress gain	

== See also ==
- List of parliamentary constituencies of Nepal
