= Nechasalyan Rural Municipality =

Nechasalyan Rural Municipality नेचासल्यान गाउँपालिका
- Rural Municipality
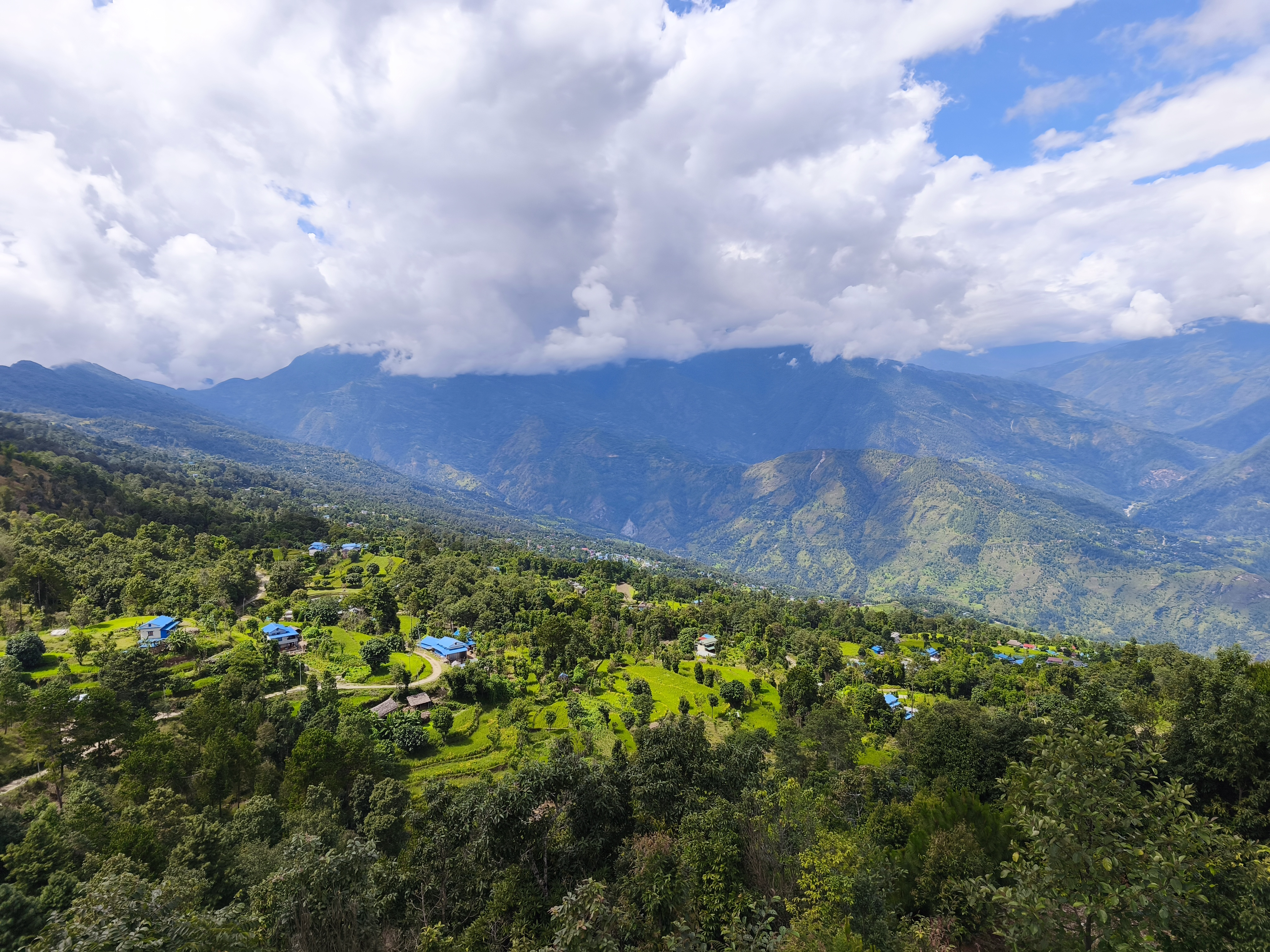
- A wide view of Necha Salyan Rural Municipality from Furke Danda

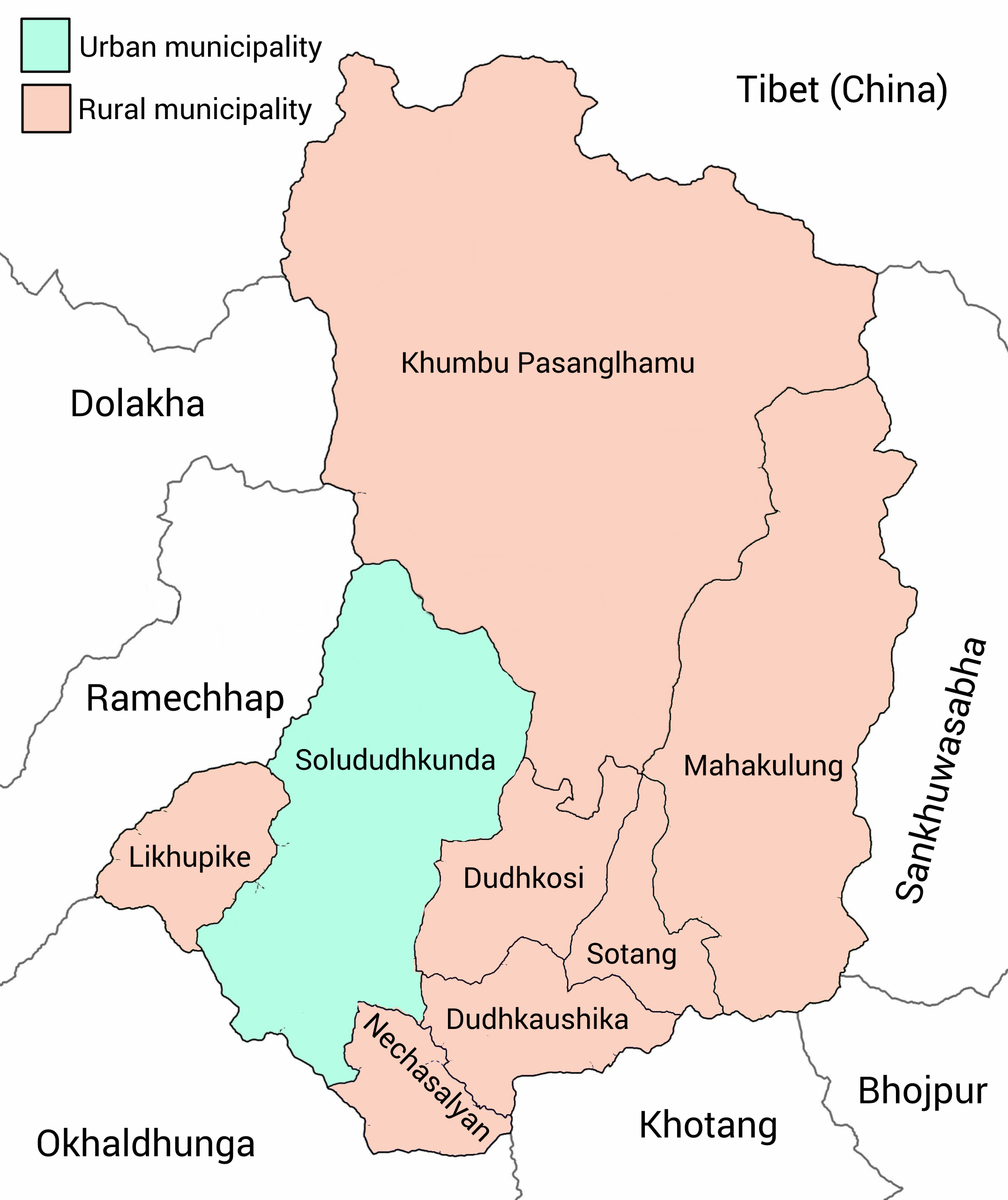
- Necha-Salyan Gaupalika in map of Solukhumbu

- Necha Salyan Gaupalika in Province No. 1 Nechasalyan Rural Municipality (Nepal)
- Coordinates: 27.3600°N 86.6600°E
- country: Nepal
- Province: Province No. 1
- District: Solukhumbu District
- Total wards: 5
- Established: 10 March 2017

Government
  - Type: Rural council
  - Chairperson: Dhanraj Rai (NC)
  - Vice-chairperson: Bina Rai (NC)
  - Executive Officer: Tankanath Ghimire

Area
  - Total: 94.49 km^{2} (36.48 sq mi)

Population (2017)
  - Total: 16,129
  - Density: 170.7/km^{2} (442.1/sq mi)
- Time zone: UTC+5:45 (Nepal Standard Time)
- Area code: +977-038
- Headquarters: Necha Bedghari
- Website: nechasalyanmun.gov.np

Nechasalyan (Nepali: नेचासल्यान गाउँपालिका) is a rural municipality, or gaunpalika, located in Solukhumbu District, Province No. 1, Nepal. Solukhumbu has eight municipalities in all; one is an urban municipality (or nagarpalika) and the other seven are rural municipalities.

According to the Ministry of Federal Affairs and Local Development, Nechasalyan has an area of 94.49 square kilometres (36.48 mi^{2}) and the total population of the municipality is 16,129 as of the Census of Nepal 2011.

Nechasalyan was created by the merger of three previously separate village development committees (or VDCs): Salyan, Necha Bedghari, and Necha Batase. This merger was a result of the new Constitution of Nepal 2015. The Ministry of Federal Affairs and Local Development replaced all the old VDCs and municipalities, replacing them with 753 new local-level bodies (Municipality).

This rural municipality is subdivided into five wards, with its headquarters in Ward No. 3 in Necha Bedghari.
