= Manbir Rai =

Nepali politician

- मानबीर राई

Minister of Defence of Nepal
- In office 15 July 2024 – 9 September 2025
- President: Ram Chandra Poudel
- Prime Minister: KP Sharma Oli
- Preceded by: Purna Bahadur Khadka

Member of Parliament, Pratinidhi Sabha
- In office 26 December 2022 – 12 September 2025
- Preceded by: Hem Kumar Rai
- Constituency: Solukhumbu 1

Personal details
- Born: 12 July 1970 (age 55) Solukhumbu District
- Party: CPN (UML)

Manbir Rai (Nepali: मानबीर राई) is a Nepalese politician, belonging to the Communist Party of Nepal (Unified Marxist–Leninist). He was the Minister of Defence in the Government of Nepal before the Gen Z Protests. Rai also served as a member of the 2nd Federal Parliament of Nepal before the dissolution of the Parliament. In the 2022 Nepalese general election, he was elected from the Solukhumbu 1 (constituency).
