= Necha Bedghari =

Former Village Development Committee in Nepal

Necha Betghari नेचावेतघारी Betghari in common
- Village development committee
- Location in Nepal
- Coordinates: 27.36°N 86.66°E
- Country: Nepal
- Zone: Sagarmatha Zone
- District: Solukhumbu District

Population (1991)
  - Total: 4,155
- Time zone: UTC+5:45 (Nepal Time)

Necha Betghari was a village development committee in Solukhumbu District in the Sagarmatha Zone of north-eastern Nepal. At the time of the 1991 Nepal census it had a population of 4155 people living in 777 individual households.

The old name "Necha Bideshi" can not easily be interpreted or understood; Bideshi do not convey any apparent meaning in the modern language of this area. This is due to a general set of processes through which place names evolve over time, until their obvious meaning is lost. Its current name Betghari (नेचा बेतघारी) is false analogy. The current name suggests this place has a unique cane (बेत) in the locality along with goddess Kalika, one of the goddess of power (शक्तिकि देवी).

Necha Betghari is also home to various people of different ethnicity. This is populated by Native Kirats and Brahmins (Jamarkattels, Bastola, Bhattarai, Ghimire, Acharya, Fuyal), Chettris (Bhandari, Raut, Basnet) and Dalits. Since a long period of time people are engaged in agriculture and farming.

It is now part of Nechasalyan Rural Municipality.
