= Necha Batase =

Former Village Development Committee in Nepal

Necha Batase नेचा बतासे
- Village development committee
- Nickname: Necha
- Country: Nepal
- Zone: Sagarmatha Zone
- District: Solukhumbu District

Population (1991)
  - Total: 3,522
- Time zone: UTC+5:45 (Nepal Time)

Necha Batase was a village development committee in Solukhumbu District in the Sagarmatha Zone of north-eastern Nepal. At the time of the 1991 Nepal census it had a population of 3522 people living in 680 individual households.

It is now part of Nechasalyan Rural Municipality.
