= Cooperative scandal in Nepal =

Fraud involving cooperative savings and credit institutions in Nepal

Cooperative scandal in Nepal refers to financial misconduct and embezzlement carried out through cooperative savings and credit institutions, often involving misuse of public deposits. The issue has grown into a significant social and political concern, affecting thousands of Nepali citizens and exposing weaknesses in regulatory oversight and political influence.

== Background ==
Cooperative institutions in Nepal, especially savings and credit cooperatives, have played a crucial role in providing financial services to low- and middle-income populations, particularly in rural areas. As of 2023, Nepal had over 30,000 registered cooperatives, with more than 7 million members.

These cooperatives operate under the Cooperative Act 2048 (1991) and are overseen by the Department of Cooperatives under the Ministry of Land Management, Cooperatives and Poverty Alleviation. However, regulatory oversight has been weak, leading to widespread mismanagement and fraudulent activities.

== Major scandals ==
One of the most high-profile cases of cooperative fraud involved Dev Kumar Nepali, the former mayor of Dhorpatan Municipality in Baglung District. He was accused of embezzling over NPR 2.25 billion from depositors through the Image Savings and Credit Cooperative, which he founded and chaired. After evading authorities for several months, he was arrested in New Delhi in September 2024 and extradited to Nepal.

Another major cooperative, Oriental Cooperative, led by businessman Dipak Manange, was investigated for failing to return deposits worth over NPR 6 billion. Numerous similar cases have emerged in Kathmandu, Pokhara, and Butwal, leading to protests by victims and demands for government intervention.

=== Gorkha Media Cooperative Scam ===
The Gorkha Media Cooperative Scam is a major Nepal economic scandal involving the suspected diversion of some NPR 2.58 billion from different cooperatives, with most of the money going into Gorkha Media Network Pvt. Ltd., a media company operating Galaxy 4K Television. The scandal, which emerged in the early 2020s, has involved main actors like Gitendra Babu (GB) Rai and former Home Minister Rabi Lamichhane and has evoked large-scale protests, parliamentary probes, and legal actions. The case has impacted around 50,000 depositors in Nepal and has become one of the largest financial fraud cases in the country over the past few years.

==== Background ====
The Gorkha Media Cooperative Scam entails the misappropriation of money from different savings and credit cooperatives across Nepal, which was allegedly channeled into Gorkha Media Network Pvt. Ltd. and affiliate organizations. Cooperatives, which are meant to manage savings and offer loans to their members, are regulated by Nepal's Cooperative Act of 2074, which forbids moving members' savings to private firms.

The scandal first broke after depositors reported being unable to get their savings back, which necessitated investigations by police, the Central Investigation Bureau (CIB), and a parliamentary committee. The cooperative sector in Nepal has been particularly vulnerable to fraudulent schemes due to a lack of proper monitoring and regulation, thus being an easy target for dishonest people who desire to exploit the trust of ordinary people who keep their savings and obtain credit facilities from such institutions.

==== Origins and Evolution ====
Gorkha Media Network Pvt. Ltd., the owner of Galaxy 4K Television, was initially a media company but became involved with financial malpractices once it began receiving significant investments from cooperatives across Nepal. The company's business model appeared to rely on external cooperative funding, in contrast to traditional media revenue sources, which indicate its economic viability being uncertain and the authenticity of such arrangements.

The scam is believed to have begun as early as 2017, and consistent transfers of cooperative funds into the Gorkha Media Network had been happening for years. The scam involved making false documents, counterfeit share certificates, and misleading cooperative members about the nature and security of their investment.

==== Cooperatives that played leading roles ====
The scandal encompasses a few cooperatives across different provinces in Nepal that all played lead roles in sending huge investments to Gorkha Media Network:

Suryadarshan Cooperative (Pokhara): Supposed to have sent NPR 300 million to Gorkha Media Network. This cooperative was among the first to be probed, and police raids were conducted at linked premises. Arrest warrants were made against 19 individuals, including GB Rai, in connection with this cooperative alone, on charges of siphoning off Rs 1.12 billion from the depositors.

Supreme Cooperative (Butwal): Transferred over NPR 150.31 million, including a NPR 20 million loan in the name of Rabi Lamichhane. Investigations were carried out to reveal that loans were given by crediting dummy mortgage loan accounts rather than actual loans being taken.

Swarnalaxmi Cooperative (Kathmandu): Made NPR 64 million investments to Gorkha Media. This incident resulted in arrest warrants for GB Rai and 23 others, with more than Rs 2.65 billion deposits allegedly misappropriated.

Sahara Cooperative (Chitwan): Transferred NPR 117 million to Gorkha Media.

Sano Paila Cooperative (Birgunj) and Samanta Cooperative (Nepalgunj): Also engaged in siphoning off funds, which went into the overall fraud scheme.

==== Key Parties Involved ====
The scandal involves several individuals and institutions, with fraud and mismanagement charges:

==== Main Accused ====
Gitendra Babu (GB) Rai: Gorkha Media Network Chairman, who is accused of masterminding the embezzlement of NPR 2.58 billion. Rai is at the heart of the scandal, with investigations unearthing his role in the diversion of cooperative money into his media venture. He fled Nepal and is believed to be in Malaysia, with a diffusion notice issued through Interpol for his arrest. Home Minister Rabi Lamichhane has stated that discussions are underway to bring Rai back to Nepal.

Rabi Lamichhane: Former managing director of Gorkha Media Network (February 2021–July 2022) and chairman of the Rastriya Swatantra Party (RSP), and former Home Minister of Nepal. Investigations revealed he issued checks mobilizing NPR 800.31 million of cooperative funds during his term. Lamichhane has denied personal involvement, stating he was only an employee and was not aware of the sources of funds and asserting that managing directors cannot be held responsible for every company decision. According to legal experts, however, his designation of managing director makes him responsible for the company's financial decisions. In April 2025, the Butwal bench of Tulsipur High Court remanded Lamichhane to pre-trial detention, overturning the order of the Rupandehi District Court.

==== Other Significant Individuals ====
Chhabilal Joshi: Ex-Deputy Inspector General of Police and Gorkha Media Network director, who holds 35% of shares in the company. Joshi was taken into custody in September 2024 for further investigation. During raids on his Pokhara residence, police also arrested four servers containing possibly crucial evidence.

Kumar Ramtel: Gorkha Media Network Director, arrested and jailed for paying loan installments on Lamichhane's behalf, indicating the interrelatedness of the financial dealings within the firm.

==== Investigations ====
Several investigating organizations have been busy digging up the scale and realities of the fraud:

==== Police and Central Investigation Bureau (CIB) ====
Nepal Police and CIB started investigating the scam after receiving complaints from depositors who had been unable to withdraw their savings. In February 2024, a team of CIB visited Suryadarshan Cooperative in Pokhara, conducted raids, and seized servers from the home of Chhabilal Joshi that had important evidence.

Police probes have established that NPR 958.1 million was siphoned off from four cooperatives to Gorkha Media Network, with NPR 800.31 million shifted during the period when Lamichhane was managing director. The scope of the probe has been record-breaking, with more than 600 people arrested in relation to different cooperative fraud cases.

A notice of diffusion was issued through Interpol against GB Rai and others, which indicates the international reach of the search.

==== Parliamentary Inquiry ====
A parliamentary special committee, established on May 28, 2024, and chaired by Surya Thapa, carried out a thorough probe into cooperative fund embezzlement. The committee comprised 29 victimized cooperatives, although the bulk of the attention continued to lie with Gorkha Media Network and the main accused individuals.

The 2,000-page report presented by the committee in September 2024 concluded that NPR 655.4 million was illegally transferred to Gorkha Media Network, and share transactions were done with forged documents. Systematic fraud with fake documents and misleading financial reports were the findings of the investigation.

The parliamentary committee again said that shareholders and managing directors can't be exempted from company activities, directly opposite to Lamichhane's claims of non-involvement and ignorance on the sources of funds. The report recommended that Rai, Lamichhane, Joshi, and Ramtel be prosecuted for their role in the scam.

==== Legal Response ====
The legal response to the scandal has been extensive, with multiple jurisdictions in their courts to hear cases. Over 600 individuals have been arrested on cooperative scam charges and their numbers include senior brass like Lamichhane and Joshi.

Kaski and Rupandehi courts have also granted extensions of custody for further investigation into fraud, forgery, money laundering, and organized crime charges. The Kathmandu District Court has also issued warrants for arrest against important figures, showing the multi-jurisdictional nature of legal proceedings.

There are still ongoing cases in various District Courts, the intricacies and scale of fraud requiring extensive legal resources and time to prosecute to the fullest. In addition to cases in Rupandehi and Kaski, a fraud case has also been filed against Lamichhane and 28 others at the Parsa District Court in connection with the Sano Paila Savings and Credit Cooperative.

==== Impact ====
The scandal has had far-reaching effects in many spheres of Nepalese society:

==== Financial Impact ====
The scam affected around 50,000 depositors in Nepal, resulting in huge financial losses and loss of public confidence in the cooperative sector. Thousands of depositors cannot withdraw their life savings, leading to personal financial crises for thousands of families and individuals who had relied on these cooperatives for their economic security.

The total loss of NPR 2.58 billion is one of the largest recent financial scams in Nepal, and it exposes Nepal's cooperative sector weaknesses as well as those of its financial regulatory mechanisms.

==== Social and Political Impact ====
Protests erupted in Pokhara and other areas, and depositors formed the Cooperative Victims Struggle Committee to demand justice and the recovery of their funds. Victims have protested the government's failure to arrest GB Rai and compensate them for their financial losses, appealing for Prime Minister Dahal to intervene.

The case has serious political implications for the Rastriya Swatantra Party, especially its chairman Rabi Lamichhane, who is heavily implicated in the case. The scandal has somewhat discredited the party's image as well as Lamichhane's political standing, as he had been an emerging figure in Nepalese politics.

==== Media Freedom Concerns ====
The scandal has raised serious concerns over press freedom in Nepal. The arrest of Kantipur Media Group chairman Kailash Sirohiya in May 2024 was seen as retaliation for reporting on the scam, and it highlights the intersection between political clout, media ownership, and press freedom.

This has had the deteriorating impact on media reporting on sensitive financial and political issues, with media houses and journalists intimidated by retribution for investigative reporting on corruption and fraud cases.

==== Criticism and Controversies ====
The government's reaction to the scandal has been criticized from multiple fronts:

==== Government Response ====
Critics argue that the government's response has been inadequate and politically motivated. Opposition parties, particularly the Nepali Congress, have accused authorities of protecting high-profile figures like Lamichhane while aggressively pursuing lower-level suspects. There are allegations that Lamichhane, during his tenure as Home Minister, may have hindered investigations into the very case in which he was implicated.

==== Political Motivations ====
Rabi Lamichhane's and the RSP's supporters claim he is being unfairly targeted due to his rapid political rise and anti-establishment politics. They claim the case is an instance of political persecution on a mission to discredit the RSP's rising influence in Nepalese politics.

Nevertheless, legal specialists have stressed that irrespective of political motives, shareholders and managing directors cannot escape liability for their companies' actions, especially those that involve such large-scale financial irregularities.

==== Systemic Issues ====
The scandal has exposed huge regulatory loopholes and gaps in supervising Nepal's cooperative sector. Critics argue that the lack of proper monitoring and oversight mechanisms made it possible for such gargantuan fraud to remain undetected for years. The case has brought the need for widespread reform of the cooperative sector into sharp focus to prevent such incidents in the future.

==== Current Developments ====
The case remains ongoing as of 2025 with several developments:

==== Current Status of Key Figures ====
GB Rai remains a fugitive, and there have been reports of conflicting stories about him being arrested in Singapore. There were reports of him being detained by some agencies, but Nepal Police stated that there are yet to be verified the rumors of his arrest. His fugitive status now represents how hard it is for Nepal Police to pursue high-profile cases of fraud.

The legal status of Rabi Lamichhane keeps changing, as court cases are pending in various jurisdictions. His case has turned into a challenge for Nepal's judiciary to prove its capability to tackle politically charged corruption cases.

==== Reform Initiatives ====
The scandal prompted demands for comprehensive reform of Nepal's cooperative sector, including enhanced oversight mechanisms, stronger regulatory compliance rules, and better protections for depositors' funds. But concrete reform measures are yet to be implemented, and the sector remains vulnerable to perpetrating such frauds.

== Government response ==
In response to mounting scandals, the government formed the High-Level Cooperative Fraud Investigation Commission in early 2024. The commission is mandated to investigate large-scale fraud, recommend legal reforms, and ensure recovery of misappropriated funds.

The Department of Cooperatives has also started implementing stricter audit rules and mandatory reporting procedures for cooperatives holding deposits above a specified threshold.

== Public impact ==
Cooperative fraud has deeply affected depositors, many of whom invested their life savings in such institutions. Victims have staged nationwide protests, accusing authorities of inaction and shielding politically connected fraudsters. The crisis has eroded public trust in Nepal's cooperative movement, which had previously been seen as a grassroots success story.

== High-profile individuals involved in cooperative fraud in Nepal ==
Numerous high-profile individuals, including politicians, businesspersons, and cooperative officials, have been implicated in Nepal’s ongoing cooperative fraud scandals. Below is a list of key figures:

=== Politicians and Public Figures ===
- Rabi Lamichhane, chairman of the Rastriya Swatantra Party and former Home Minister, was found complicit in embezzling cooperative funds through Gorkha Media Network, where he served as managing director. Funds from cooperatives such as Swarnalaxmi, Suryadarshan, and Supreme were misused under his leadership.
- Dhanraj Gurung, Vice President of the Nepali Congress, had a complaint filed against him in relation to the Miteri Savings and Credit Cooperative fraud. His former spouse, Jyoti Gurung, is a key figure in the case and is currently absconding.
- Gita Basnet, a Member of Parliament from the Rastriya Prajatantra Party, had an arrest warrant issued against her for allegedly misusing cooperative funds to invest in Krishnasar Resort.
- Ichchha Raj Tamang, former Member of Parliament from the CPN-UML, was convicted of embezzling approximately NPR 8 billion from Civil Cooperative and is also implicated in banking offenses.
- Dev Kumar Nepali, mayor of Dhorpatan Municipality in Baglung District. He is the founder and former chairman of the Image Savings and Credit Cooperative, which has been at the center of one of Nepal’s largest cooperative fraud scandals, accused of embezzling over NPR 2.25 billion from thousands of depositors.

=== Cooperative Officials and Businesspersons ===
- Gitendra Babu (GB) Rai, chairman of Gorkha Media Network, is accused of orchestrating the transfer of cooperative funds to Gorkha Media and is currently absconding.
- Kumar Ramtel, director of Gorkha Media and former owner of Suryadarshan Cooperative, admitted to using cooperative funds to repay loans on behalf of Rabi Lamichhane. He is currently in custody.
- Chhabilal Joshi, former Deputy Inspector General of Police and director at Gorkha Media, has been arrested in relation to the embezzlement of funds from several cooperatives.
- Kedarnath Sharma, operator of Shiva Shikhar and Tulsi Cooperatives, was convicted of embezzling over NPR 14 billion from depositors and is currently serving his sentence.
- Chandra Bahadur (CB) Lama, former Nepali Congress candidate and operator of Kantipur Savings and Credit Cooperative, is in custody for misappropriating billions of rupees.
- Krishna Bahadur (KB) Upreti, former official of the Central Cooperative Department of the CPN-UML and president of Rashtriya Sahakari Bank, was imprisoned for misappropriating approximately NPR 6.27 billion.
- Raman Paudel, president of Mitramilan Cooperative in Pokhara, is in jail for misusing NPR 1.8 billion of depositors’ funds.
- Ajay Shrestha, president of Sacrifice Cooperative (Pokhara) and Siddhidata Cooperative (Lalitpur), is accused of embezzling large cooperative funds and is in custody.
- Shankar Karki, president of Prime Cooperative in Pokhara, and Surendramani Paudel, CEO, were jailed for embezzling NPR 597.2 million.
- Nunam Subba, president of Citizen Development Cooperative, is in Nakkhu Jail for fund misappropriation.
- Geeta Sharma, owner of Shivsikhar Cooperative Society, is in jail for embezzling NPR 9.58 billion.
- Tejvikram Thapa, president of Bhaktapur's Agricultural Development Cooperative, is in Nakkhu Jail for defrauding NPR 2.78 billion.
- Leela Bahadur (LB) Gurung, president of Kalyan Upkar Sahakari, is in Nakkhu Jail for misappropriating cooperative savings.
- Rabindra Chaulagai, president of Deurali Multi-Purpose Cooperative, is in Nakkhu Jail on similar charges.
- Dal Bahadur Ale, chairman of Arjan Cooperative Society, is serving time in Central Jail for cooperative fraud.
- Shivkumar Gurung (aka Mahendra Bhote), former director of Suryadarshan Cooperative in Pokhara, is imprisoned for misappropriating NPR 1.35 billion.
- Bhabishwar Aryal, software developer for Suryadarshan Cooperative, is in custody on charges of aiding the embezzlement.
- Ram Bahadur Khanal, shareholder of Gorkha Group and director of Nature Herbs International Pvt. Ltd., was arrested in relation to fund misuse from Surya Darshan Cooperative.

== See also ==
- Economy of Nepal
- Corruption in Nepal
- Nepal Rastra Bank
