= Jhumka regional prison =

Jail in Nepal

- Location within Nepal
- Location: Jhumka, Sunsari district, Nepal; 26.670°N 87.192°E
- Capacity: 1500

Jhumka regional prison (Nepali:झुम्का कारागार, Jhumka Karagar) is the largest correction centre in Eastern Nepal. It is located near Jhumka town in Sunsari district. Initially, it had a capacity of 500 inmates; it was upgraded in 2014 to accommodate 1500 inmates. The prison has a facility for the education and training of the prisoners.

== Jailbreaks ==
- 12 inmates escaped the jail by digging a tunnel in 2012.

== See also ==
- List of prisons in Nepal
