= Nepal visit visa extortion scandal =

Crime scandal in Nepal

The Visit Visa Extortion Scandal in Nepal refers to a systemic human trafficking and corruption racket at the immigration department of Tribhuvan International Airport, involving the illegal issuance of documents required for the visit visas on bribe. The scheme implicated government officials, immigration officers, brokers, and travel agencies in an organized extortion operation targeting aspiring travelers and immigrant workers.

== Background ==
The process of obtaining a working visa entails navigating a series of bureaucratic procedures, including the acquisition of an employment certificate, official permission to work abroad from local authorities, the purchase of life insurance, and other administrative requirements. Due to the involvement of multiple government agencies, as well as the associated financial and time burdens, many prospective migrant workers opted to apply for visit visas instead. The requirements for visit visas were comparatively lenient, making them a more accessible alternative. However, by around 2023, the government had become aware of this practice and responded by introducing more stringent immigration regulations. These included complex eligibility criteria for visit visa applicants, such as the need to demonstrate proof of income, evidence of previous travel to Gulf countries, educational qualifications, round-trip flight tickets, and minimum bank balances. These rigid and often burdensome conditions inadvertently drove many applicants to seek the services of brokers, who facilitated the process by providing falsified documents.

In late 2023, Nepalese authorities uncovered extensive forgery operations linked to visit visa applications, involving the production and use of more than 1,500 falsified documents. These forged materials included bank statements, police clearance certificates, and other supporting documentation intended to meet visa requirements. Investigations revealed that applicants had paid bribes ranging from NPR 10,000 to NPR 300,000, with fees varying according to the intended destination. Notably, individuals seeking visas for European countries were charged significantly higher amounts, reflecting the perceived difficulty and desirability of such destinations.

Despite official travel restrictions, a significant number of Nepali citizens—particularly women—sought employment opportunities in Gulf countries. Exploiting this demand, brokers created comprehensive packages that included forged documents and fraudulent visa approvals, effectively using visit visas as a legal loophole to enable overseas labor migration. Amid the unfolding scandal, personnel from the Anti-Human Trafficking Investigation Bureau of the Nepal Police stationed at Tribhuvan International Airport were reportedly removed, allegedly to facilitate the trafficking process under the pretense of visit visa travel. A well-coordinated network comprising travel agents, immigration officers, airline staff, police personnel, and officials from the Ministry of Home Affairs was implicated in the scheme. This network played a central role in processing falsified documents and circumventing legal requirements in exchange for bribes.

== Investigation and reactions ==
The CIAA continues its investigation, seizing devices and documents from suspects. Lekhak has stated he would resign from politics if found guilty.

=== 2023 TIA Raid ===
The Kathmandu Valley Crime Investigation Office arrested key individuals including Deepak KC, Bal Bahadur Rawat, and Saroj Yadav. These individuals confessed to bribing officials such as Narbir Khadka. Altogether, 22 people were charged, with 9 immigration officers prosecuted and 12 suspects evading arrest.

=== May 2025 CIAA Raid ===
On 21 May 2025, the Commission for the Investigation of Abuse of Authority (CIAA) raided the TIA immigration office and arrested Joint Secretary Tirtha Raj Bhattarai. Evidence including mobile phones and documents linked Bhattarai to illegal visa issuance and trafficking.

=== Political Fallout ===
Opposition parties such as the Maoist Centre, Rastriya Swatantra Party, RPP, Unified Socialist, Janamat Party, and the People's Socialist Party (JSP) demanded Lekhak’s resignation. The ruling Nepali Congress and CPN-UML have remained largely silent, stating that due process must be followed. Following the pressure from opposition, in July 2025, government formed an investigation panel led by the Chief Secretary Shanker Das Bairagi.

== See also ==
- Corruption in Nepal
- Bhutanese refugees scam
