= Maitighar Mandala =

Symbolic monument

- माइतीघर मण्डला / फिब्वः ख्यः
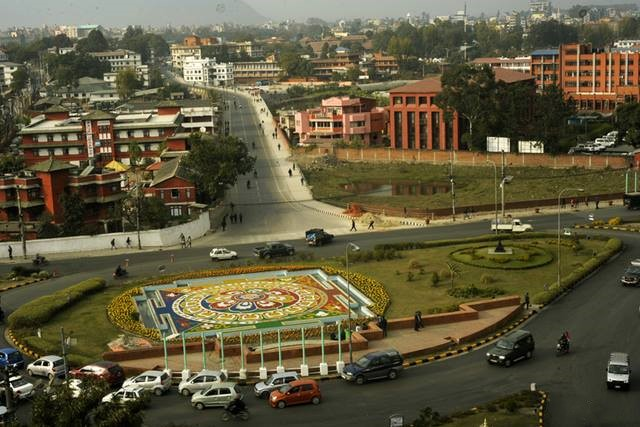
- Aerial view of Maitighar Mandala
- Interactive map of Maitighar Mandala
- Location: Kathmandu
- Coordinates: 27.694636774069195°N 85.32038141781345°E
- Type: Mandala
- Material: Concrete
- Completion date: 2001

The Fibwa Khya/Maitighar Mandala (फिब्वः ख्यः/माइतीघर मण्डला) is a symbolic monument located in the heart of Kathmandu, Nepal. It is an island at the intersection of roads from Thapathali, New Baneshwor, Bhadrakali, and at the southeast corner of Singhadurbar, the administrative centre of Nepal. It is considered an important visual landmark in Kathmandu and a masterpiece of art depicting Buddhist relics. It also acts as the initiation mark stone of one of the major highways of Nepal, Araniko Highway, which links Nepal with China.

== History ==
The Mandala was built in 2001 for the 11th SAARC summit in Nepal to showcase Nepali culture after clearing many multi-story buildings, during the tenure of mayor Keshav Sthapit.

== Etymology ==
The name "Maitighar" literally means the "parental home" of married women. The native name of the monument in the Newar language is Fibwa Khya (फिब्वः ख्यः).

== Symbolism ==
The Mandala was designed to be in the form of a series of concentric circles. The outer-most circle has 32 vajras, the next circle has 16 lotus petals, and the innermost circle has 32 garlands. The various colors of the Mandala (blue background, black, orange, and blue circles) symbolize human characteristics, of which too much of one would result in an imbalanced temperament. Black stands for Krodh (anger), orange for Prem (love) and blue for Karuṇā (compassion). At the four corners of the mandala are symbols of the Ashtamangal.

== Maintenance ==
By 2010, the Mandala artwork fell into disrepair. In 2011, the Agriculture Development Bank, Nepal pledged to devote resources to restore the Mandala. The Mandala was restored for the 18th SAARC summit alongside the overall enhancement of roads in Kathmandu.

However, by 2025 its condition once again fell into a state of neglect and disrepair. In its vicinity, traffic lights were not operational, road lines were faded and non-existent, unauthorised bus stops were present, and the roads and footpaths were not maintained.

== Significant events ==
After the Nepalese Civil War, peace advocates gathered at the Mandala to show solidarity against violence.

In 2018, the Kathmandu District Administration placed a ban on protests at the Mandala. Despite this ban, local St. Xaver Collage and Thapathali Campus students and patients at the Annapurna Neurological Institute and Allied Sciences were still affected by the loud noise caused by protests and loudspeaker use. Protests at the monument caused long traffic jams which extend to other road junctions. These disruptions caused severe discontent with local residents.

In September 2025, a large crowd consisting mainly of school and college students gathered at the Mandala in protest against governmental corruption and mismanagement—in particular, their decision to ban social media platforms—as a part of the 2025 Nepalese Gen Z protests.

== Gallery ==
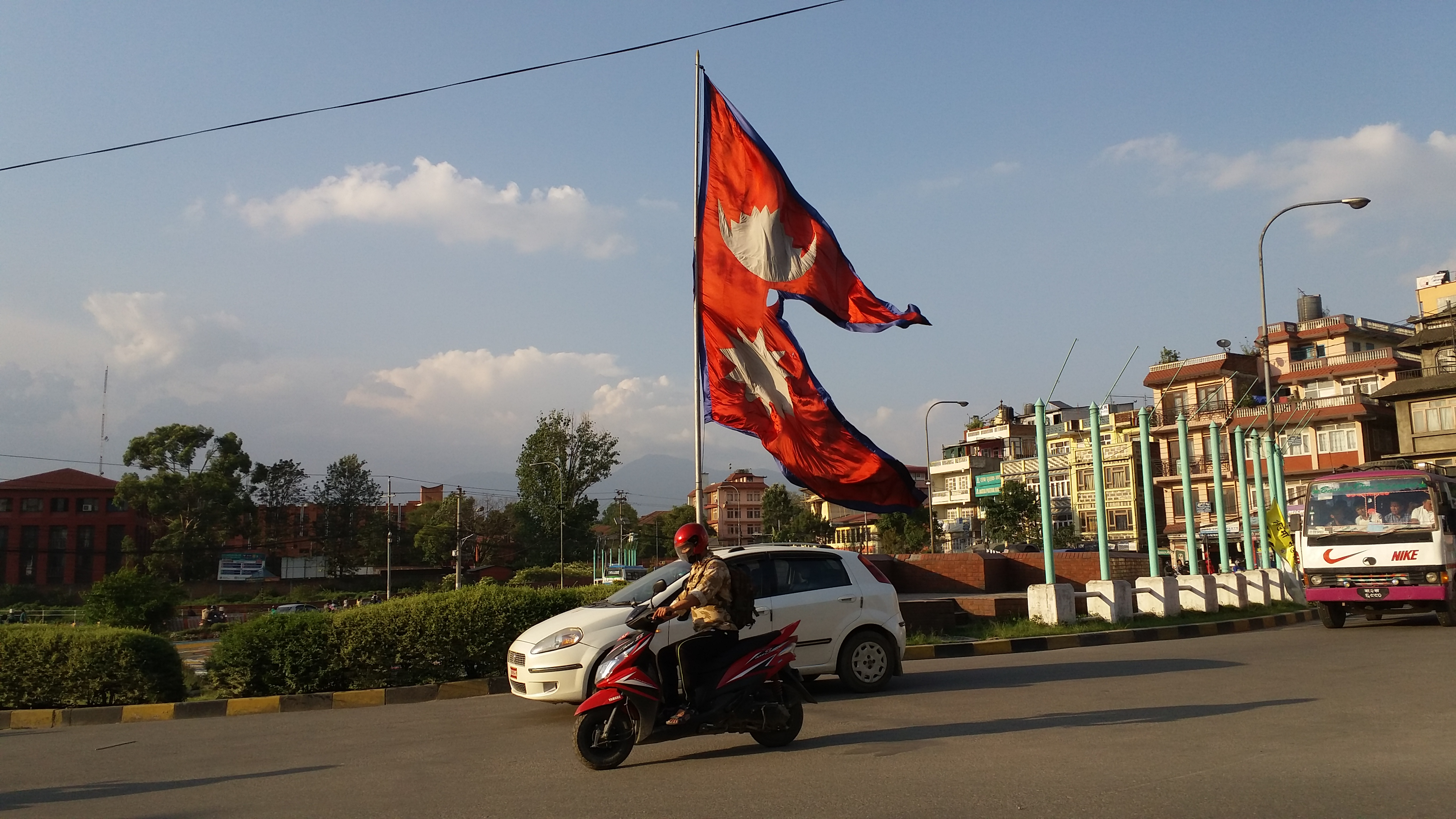
Huge flag of Nepal near the Mandala

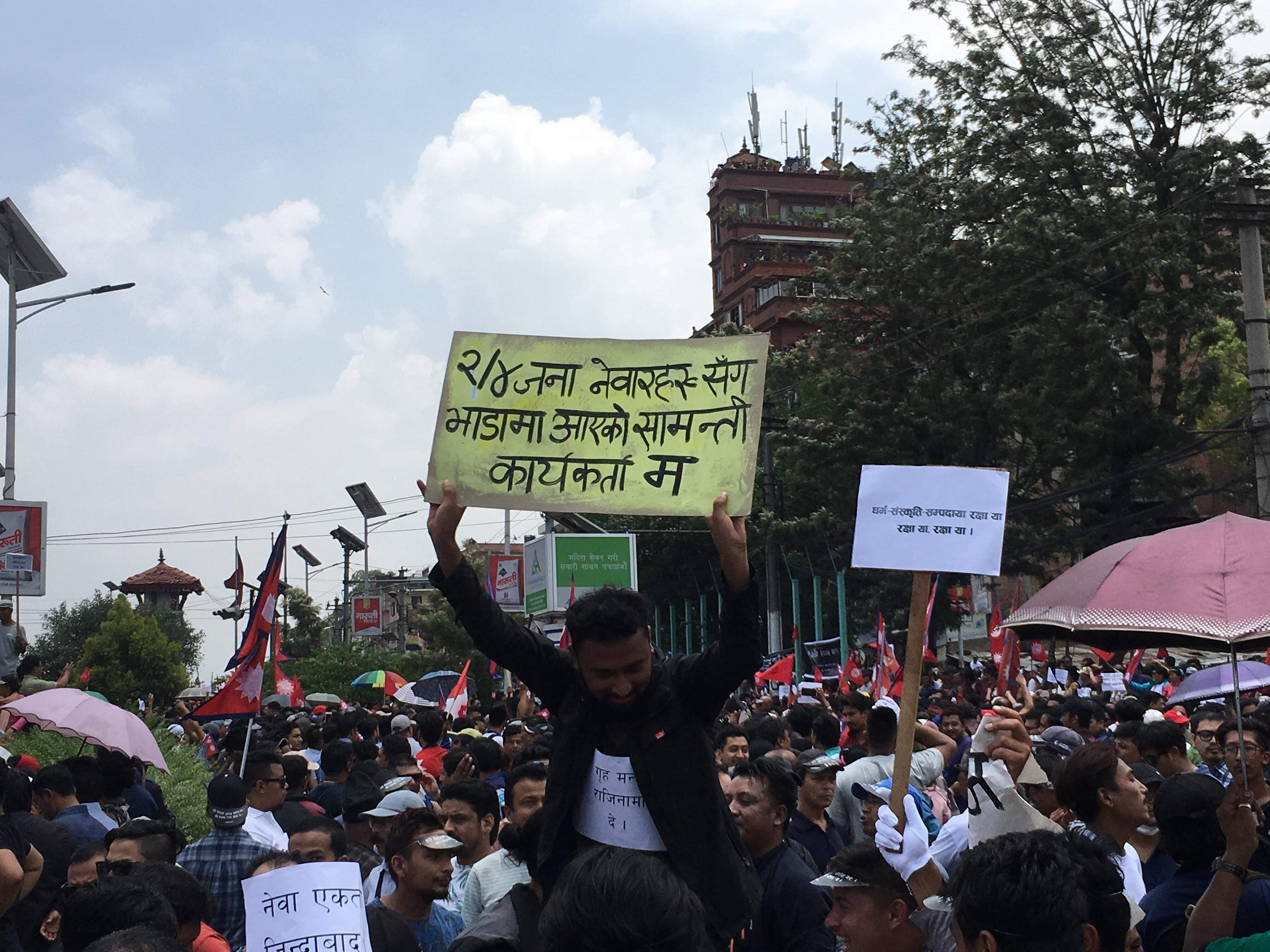
Guthi Bill Protest at the Mandala

== See also ==
- Dharahara
- Garden of Dreams
- Ghanta Ghar
