= 2025 Nepalese Gen Z protests =

Anti-government upheaval in Nepal

2025 Nepal Gen-Z Revolution
- Third People's Movement; Part of the Gen Z protests in Asia
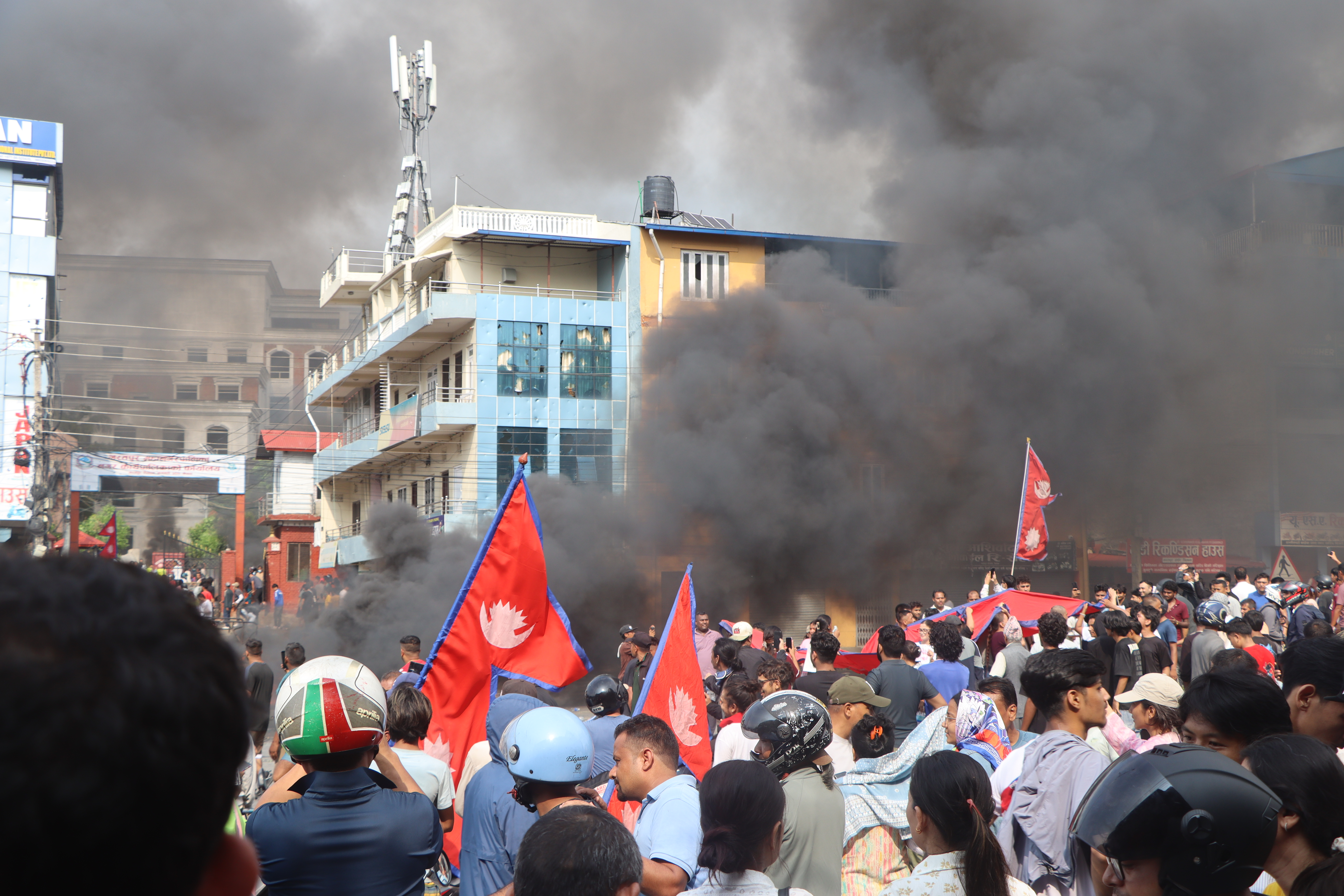
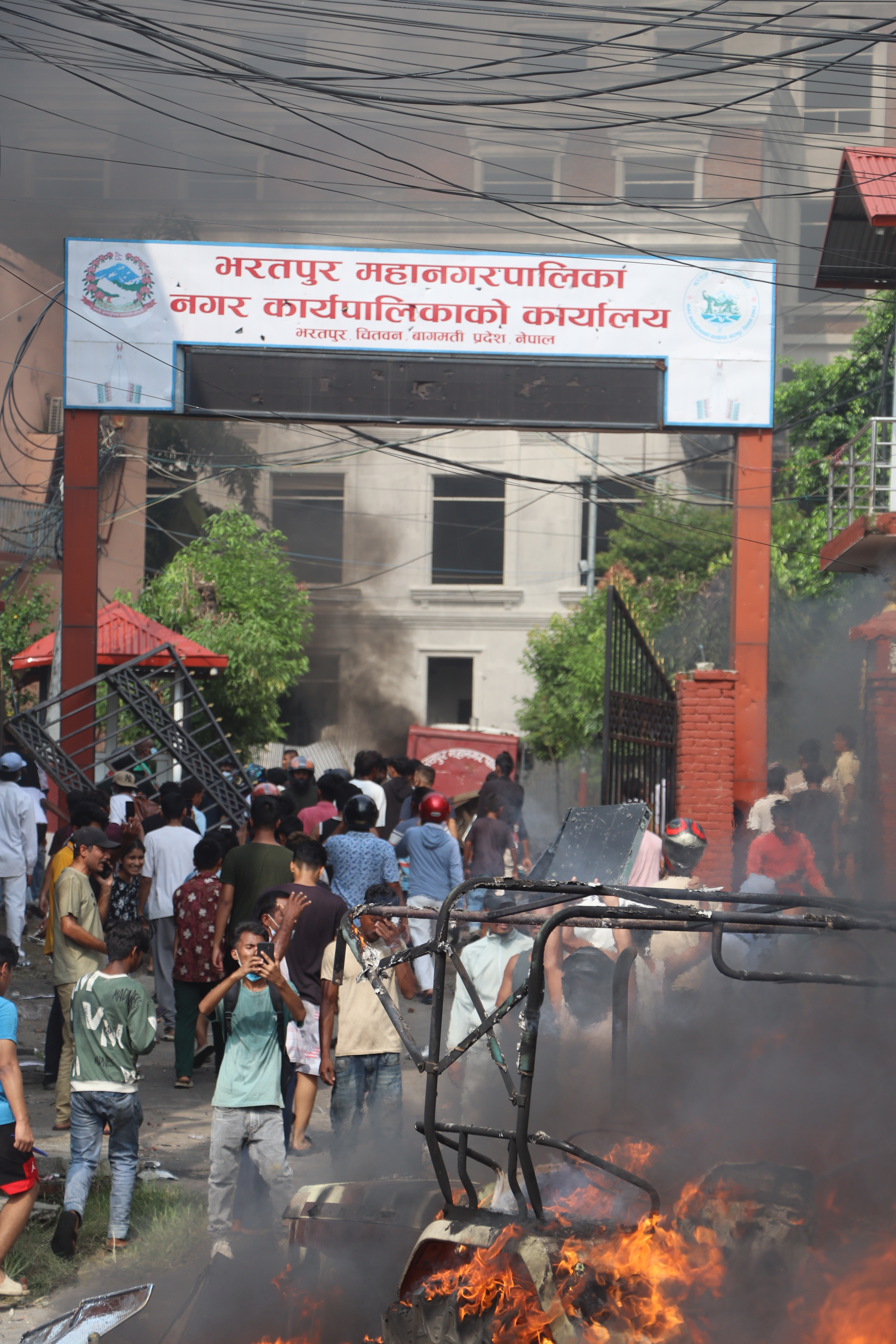
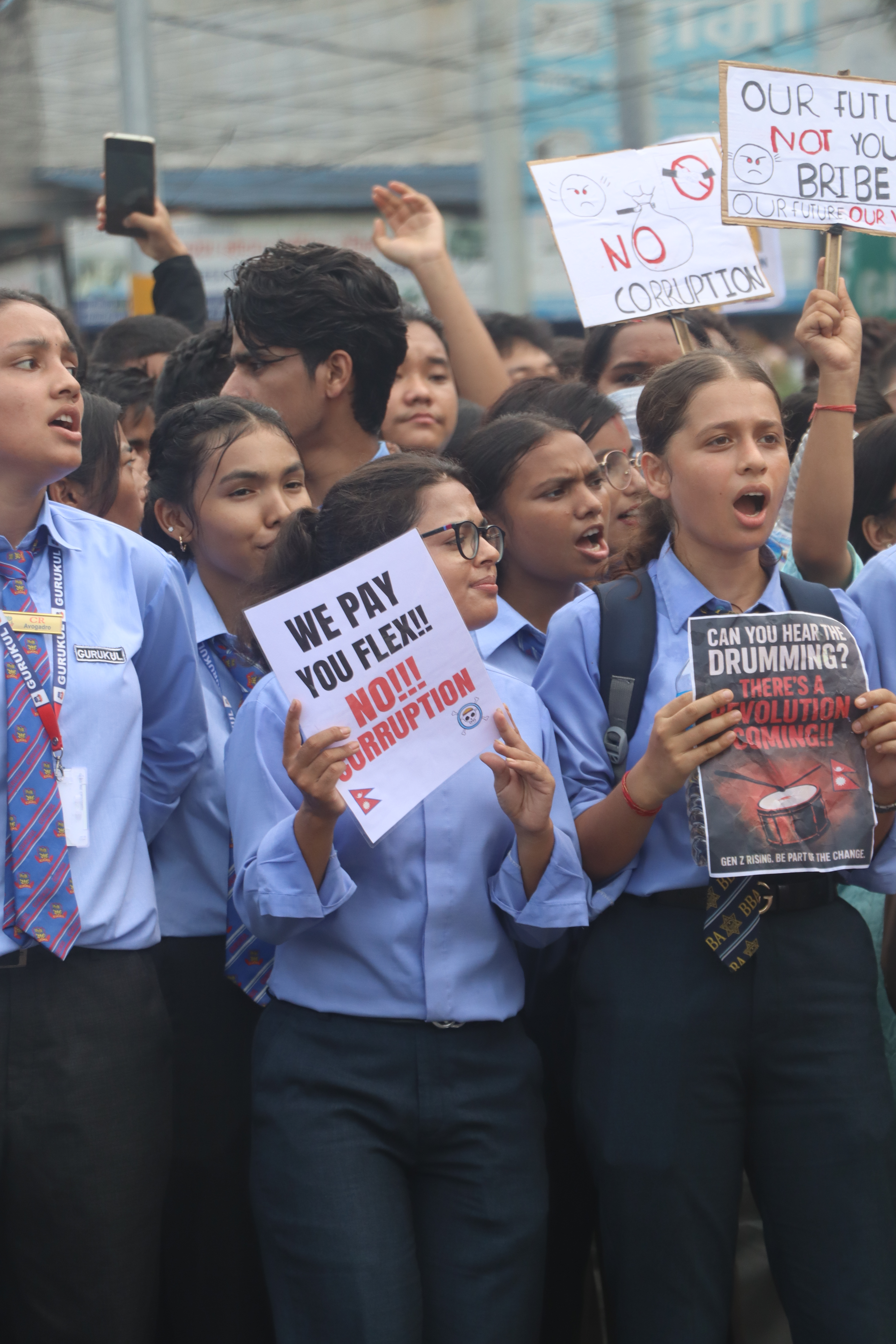
- From top to bottom: Protesters burn down a government office; Student demonstrations
- Date: 8–13 September 2025 (5 days)
- Location: Nepal
- Caused by: Government corruption and nepotism; Government ban on social media platforms
- Goals: Anti-corruption; Governmental accountability and transparency; Restoration of social media platforms; Overthrow of the government
- Methods: Demonstrations; Student activism; Internet activism; Riots; Arson; Vandalism
- Result: Protests successful: Resignation of Prime Minister K. P. Sharma Oli; Multiple government buildings and political offices (including the parliament and presidential residence buildings) set on fire; Lifting of the social media ban; Nepali Army closes and occupies Tribhuvan International Airport; Sushila Karki is appointed as interim prime minister of Nepal; House of Representatives dissolved, Balen Shah elected in 2026

Parties
(Nepal) Protesters: Civilians; Youths; Students	Government of Nepal: Nepal Police; Armed Police Force; Communist Party of Nepal (Unified Marxist–Leninist); Nepali Congress

Lead figures
Decentralised leadership	Ram Chandra Paudel; K. P. Sharma Oli; Ramesh Lekhak; Manbir Rai; Chandra Kuber Khapung; Raju Aryal; Chabilal Rijal

Casualties
- Deaths: 76
- Injuries: 2,660

In September 2025, large-scale anti-corruption protests and demonstrations took place all across Nepal, predominantly organized by Generation Z students and young citizens. Known as the "Gen Z Revolution" (Note: Nepali: जेन-जी विरोध, romanized: Jēn-jī virōdha) or "Third People's Movement", they began parallel to a nationwide ban on numerous social media platforms including YouTube, Instagram, TikTok, X, Facebook, and WhatsApp, and were motivated by the public's frustration with corruption and display of wealth by government officials and their families, as well as allegations of mismanagement of public funds. The movement expanded to encompass broader issues of governance, transparency, and political accountability, and became notable for the central role that social media and digital platforms played in organizing demonstrations and facilitating public deliberation during the political transition. The situation escalated, with police violence against children and hospitals, protests against public officials, and vandalism of government and political buildings taking place throughout the country.

According to a report by Himal Southasian, this event marked the highest single-day death toll from a public protest in Nepal's history.

On 9 September 2025, Prime Minister K. P. Sharma Oli, along with a few government ministers, resigned. On 12 September, Sushila Karki was appointed the interim prime minister of Nepal. The protests subsided by 13 September.

There were 76 deaths. According to the Nepali Army's official report, of those people, 41 were arson victims, 22 were protesters, 3 were police officers, and 10 were prisoners who were shot to prevent their escape.

== Background ==
On 4 September 2025, the Government of Nepal ordered the shutdown of 26 social media platforms, including Facebook, X, YouTube, LinkedIn, Reddit, Signal, and Snapchat, for failing to register under the Ministry of Communication and Information Technology's new rules. According to People's Dispatch, the registration requirement had been motivated in part as a way to enable the enforcement of a new Digital Services Tax and stricter value-added tax rules on foreign e-service providers in an effort to boost revenue. However, critics alleged the shutdown was prompted by a social media trend highlighting nepotism, focusing on the privileges enjoyed by the children and relatives—nicknamed "Nepo Babies" or "Nepo Kids"—of influential political leaders.

According to People's Dispatch, the media platform ban had a significant impact on Nepalese political economy. Of the Nepalese GDP, 33% comes from remittances, with hundreds of thousands of exit permits being issued, alongside 20.8% youth unemployment. These remittances keep thousands of households afloat and pay import bills, and also indicate a lack of structural transformation in the domestic economy toward an employment-first model, pushing the youth into work in online spaces. Banning social media thus threatened youth livelihood.

Prior to the protests, the average Nepali citizen made US$1,400 per year, while families of the country's ruling elite displayed their wealth on social media. This "Nepo Kid" trend prompted significant public anger, particularly from Generation Z users. The median age of Nepal's population is 25, meaning that a large part of the population is in Gen Z, the age group that uses social media the most. This relatively young population, combined with the country's largely rural, rough terrain and substantial migration abroad, leads to Nepal having one of the highest social media usage rates in South Asia, about 48% of Nepalese using social media.

According to Himal Southasian, the protests were "a long time coming," fueled by a "long series of corruption scandals." involving the political and business establishment, which reinforced a "dismal view of the system." The report further noted that while Nepal has progressed since the civil war, the process has been "slow and tortuous," with public services remaining poor despite high tax burdens.

== Digital coordination ==
Youth participatory groups, particularly Hami Nepal (a non-governmental organization), used Discord online communities (called "servers" in Discord) (Note: These are not computer servers (physical computers).) and Instagram channels as central organizing tools in the Gen Z protests. According to Green European Journal, the Discord server rapidly evolved into the movement's primary communications hub before the demonstrations. Volunteers organized dedicated channels for media outreach, legal assistance, medical response, fact-checking, documentation, regional coordination and newcomer support. Participants also collaboratively prepared protest guidelines, assigned volunteer responsibilities and discussed contingency plans for possible internet disruptions.

Shaswot Lamichhane, who established the Discord server and served as the moderator manager, was a recent graduate with a background in science and technology. He was involved in the technical coordination that underpinned these exercises in digital democracy, explaining that the discussions were meant to simulate a "mini-election", emphasizing that it was intended to gauge people's preferences rather than constitute a binding election or formal appointment process.

Organizers incorporated QR codes into protest banners so that photographs distributed by news articles would also direct viewers to the Discord server. They additionally coordinated outreach to approximately 140 social media influencers before the protests to broaden participation despite the government's social media restrictions. VPNs and posted flyers were also used to evade the social media ban.

According to several news outlets, messages in the Youth Against Corruption Discord channel advocated for violence against the Nepalese leadership. Tactical discussions on Discord included procurement and use of Molotov cocktails, suggestions to seize ammunition from police stations, and instructions on disabling airplane tires using acetylene gas. After police response led to 19 deaths, organizers in some Discord servers asked members to stop attending classes. They called for an indefinite closure of colleges and schools until the government accepted accountability for the fatalities. However, Green European Journal, based on an analysis of the archived Discord logs, reported that the server had initially functioned as the movement's principle coordination hub, with dedicated channels for logistics, legal support, medical response, media outreach and fact-checking. It also reported that moderators urged protesters to remain peaceful and attempted to regain control after violence broke out, but that the rapid influx of members following the police shootings overwhelmed moderation efforts and allowed increasingly violent messages to proliferate.

After Oli's resignation, the army's chiefs met with Hami Nepal and asked them to suggest nominees for an interim leader who would oversee national elections. On a Discord server with over 100,000 members, more than 10,000 users met virtually in a Discord channel (Note: Discord communities, called "servers", are made of a number of textual or vocal "channels" that members of the community can use to communicate.) to debate. The server had sub channels for constitutional law, fact-checking and candidate research. After discussions, several polls, and the use of sub-channels for fact-checking, the members settled on Sushila Karki.

Supporters of the process were seen by Al Jazeera English as viewing the online process as "a revolutionary counter to the traditional practice of politicians choosing leaders behind closed doors, which had displayed little transparency".

Sudan Gurung, founder of the youth organization Hami Nepal coordinated online discussions through Discord and served as a liaison between protest organizers and the Nepali Army during the transition period that followed Prime Minister K. P. Sharma Oli's resignation.

== International media outreach and narrative framing ==
Using open-source intelligence (OSINT) methodology, the Nepalese media watchdog platform Media Kurakani analyzed over 60 TikTok videos to document how youth citizen journalism drove global media coverage during the demonstrations. As police responded with force on 8 September 2025, protesters livestreamed unedited smartphone footage and created English-language videos directly appealing to international outlets—including CNN, the BBC, The New York Times, Al Jazeera, and Sky News—demanding media attention as it is.

Although major global outlets initially reported the events primarily as a reaction to the government's social media ban, Gen Z activists conducted an online campaign targeting foreign journalists to correct the framing. Demonstrators asserted that the primary drivers of the movement were systemic government corruption, political nepotism, and police brutality, prompting international outlets to update their coverage accordingly. Digital appeals directed at international human rights bodies also contributed to public statements from the United Nations calling for transparent investigations into police conduct.

== Timeline ==
=== 8 September ===
Large gatherings took place in Kathmandu, particularly at Maitighar Mandala and around the federal parliament building, New Baneshwor, with tens of thousands of participants. The protests were originally organized as a peaceful rally by Hami Nepal, an NGO whose website highlights earthquake relief projects. Anil Baniya, one of the protest organizers from Hami Nepal, said the government cracked down on the protesters after some protesters began to climb the walls of the parliament complex and others threw stones. Baniya stated that what began as a peaceful protest was hijacked by "external forces and political party cadres" but that regardless, the government should not have responded to stones being thrown with live ammunition from the armed police. The Straw Hat Pirates' Jolly Roger flag from the manga series One Piece was used by some protesters, in similar fashion to the 2025 Indonesian protests.

Emerging as a decentralized movement, the protest grew and evolved to a movement with no formal leadership, individuals joined voluntarily in opposition to corruption and the social media ban. The demonstrations escalated when protesters attempted to enter the Federal Parliament of Nepal, leading security forces to respond with tear gas, water cannons, rubber bullets, and live ammunition. Video Geolocation published in the evening showed numerous victims killed in front of the parliament building. Victims were seen lying inanimate on the ground, many with serious or fatal wounds to the head and torso, many wearing school uniforms. Videos showed victims with their faces blown off. An expert identified bullets fired as coming from a lightweight 7.62x51mm automatic rifle. The Kathmandu District Administration Office imposed a curfew in parts of the capital near government buildings. However, protests continued.

The confrontations resulted in at least 19 people killed and more than 347 people injured. Seventeen of those protesters were killed in the capital. The National Human Rights Commission called on authorities not to use excessive force and to "show restraint in handling the protests."

In the evening, the government lifted the ban on social media platforms. Home Minister Ramesh Lekhak resigned and had his passport seized. A curfew was imposed in several major cities including Kathmandu, Birgunj, Bhairahawa, Butwal, Pokhara, Itahari, and Damak. Following this, protests for the complete dissolution of parliament began. This was primarily caused by the initial government response to the original protests.

=== 9 September ===
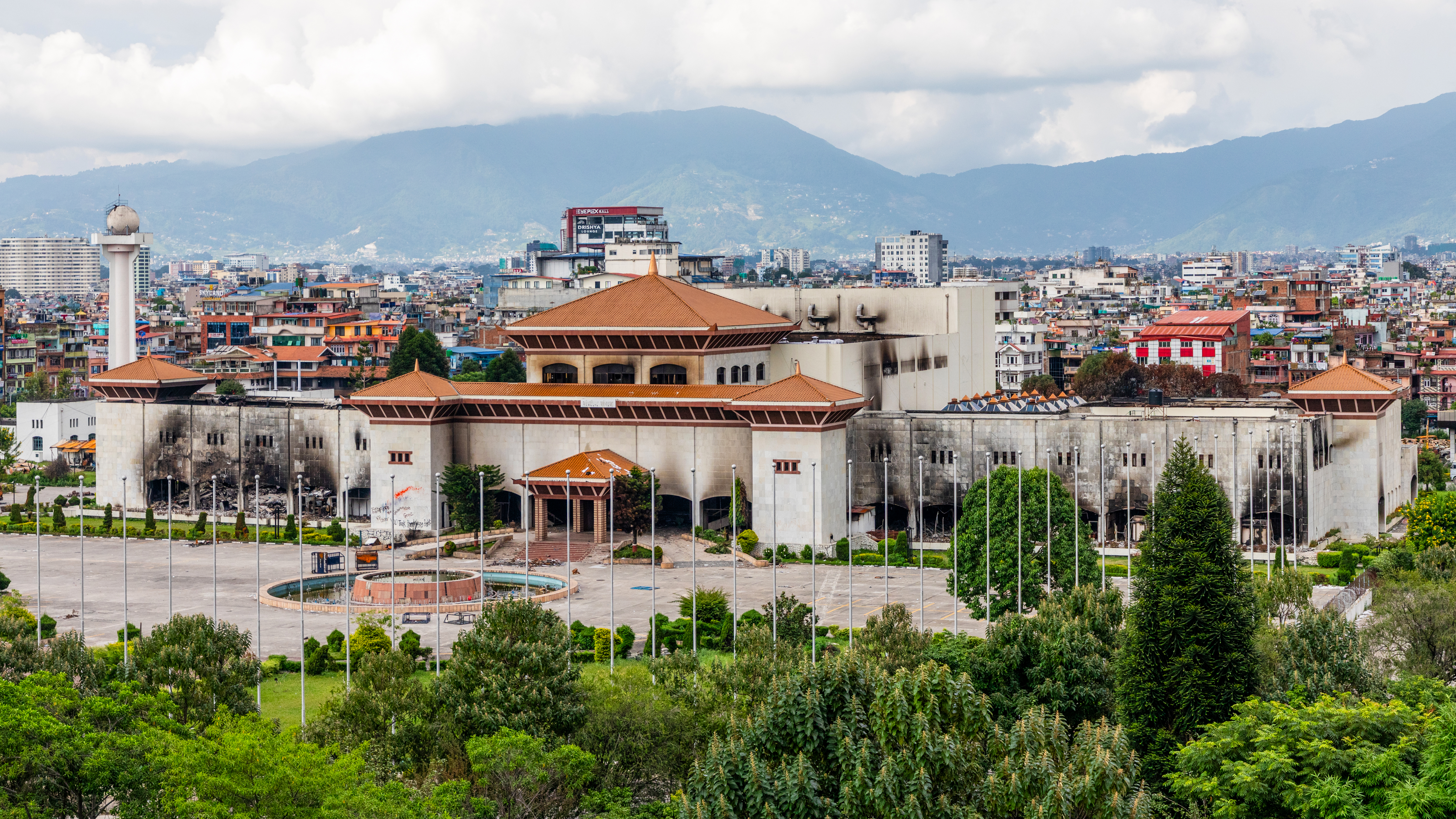
Nepalese Parliament building damaged of fire set by protesters on 20 September 2025.

Prime Minister K. P. Sharma Oli began the day with a call to all parties to cease violent action, but he did not respond to the corruption allegations. Then he directed his Communist Party of Nepal (Unified Marxist–Leninist) ministers not to resign their posts and resigned his own office. Afterwards, Oli fled to an army barracks outside of Kathmandu Valley as per his interview in Kantipur's fireside. Videos surfaced of him escaping in a helicopter, with rumors of a potential escape to India or Dubai. There were conflicting reports on whether President Ram Chandra Paudel resigned as well, as the Nepalese Army denied reports of Paudel's resignation. Despite this, protests continued nationwide. Protestors set fire to many government buildings: part of Singha Durbar, the administrative headquarters of Nepal; the adjacent building of the Supreme Court of Nepal; the president's residence at Sital Niwas; the prime minister's residence at Baluwatar; and the headquarters of the Communist Party UML. Multiple reports allege that Nepali Army commander Ashok Raj Sigdel advised Oli to resign in order for the Army to restore peace.

Protest actions targeted several prominent locations in Kathmandu, including the residences of the prime minister and the president, as well as the homes of various government ministers and members of parliament, which were set ablaze by protesters. The parliament building was set on fire and looted. The headquarters of the UML and Nepali Congress was vandalized, with party flags stripped and burned. Security forces, including the Nepali Army, facilitated the safe evacuation of politicians from affected areas and evacuated to Tribhuvan International Airport (TIA), while attempting to control the escalating incidents of arson and destruction. Minister of Agriculture Ram Nath Adhikari and Health Minister Pradip Paudel along with 21 MPs from the Rastriya Swatantra Party resigned, along with all the MPs of the Rastriya Prajatantra Party. Several members left Oli's UML party. Protestors went to TIA to block the political leaders from fleeing. The airport was closed and occupied by the Nepali Army. There was ensuing confusion as hundreds of travelers were left stranded in the TIA prompted airlines to order personnel to keep all individuals sheltered within the airport. Scheduled international flights were diverted to Pokhara or cancelled. Kantipur media house was set on fire in the early evening. The online news portal was stopped due to damage in its server, forcing it to post in Facebook as an alternative. Other buildings burned by protesters were the new Hilton Hotel in Kathmandu and the Ministry of Health building in Ramshahpath.

Several political leaders and their residences were attacked. Former prime minister Sher Bahadur Deuba and his wife, foreign minister Arzu Rana Deuba, were heavily injured while their house was set on fire where protestors found large amounts of US Dollars and Nepali Rupees. They were handed over to the police by protestors. Deputy prime minister Prakash Man Singh's house and vehicle were set on fire, followed by the house of former president Bidya Devi Bhandari at Bhangal, Kathmandu. Former prime minister Jhala Nath Khanal's residence was also set on fire, critically injuring his wife Ravi Laxmi Chitrakar. The residence of Ramesh Lekhak was also set on fire in Naikap, Kathmandu. In Rupandehi district, the houses of local politicians Bal Krishna Khand, Bhoj Prasad Shrestha and several mayors were burned. In Chitwan District, the house of former prime minister Prachanda was set on fire. His daughter Ganga Dahal's house was also set on fire at Lalitpur. A person was found dead the next day in the house. In Hetauda, several government offices were vandalized and set on fire. In Karnali Province, the parliament building and the residence of chief minister Yam Lal Kandel was set on fire. In Biratnagar, the capital of Koshi Province, the district office and district court were set on fire, followed by the residence of the chief minister and cabinet ministers.

The prison in Kailali district was attacked by the protestors. All inmates fled. Rabi Lamichhane was set free from the Nakhu Jail in Kathmandu, the prison was later set on fire; all prisoners fled. Kaski prison was also set on fire, resulting in the escape of 773 inmates. In Banke District, five inmates were killed after security forces opened fire during a jailbreak at a juvenile correctional facility. The building of the Road Department was severely damaged after being set on fire by protestors, along with the office of Commission for the Investigation of Abuse of Authority. The lower station of the Chandragiri Cable Car was also set on fire, along with the CG Electronics Digital Park, Balambu and Thankot Police Station.

Several protesters were injured. Thirty-three were treated in the Teaching Hospital. Three policemen died in Koteshwor.

Curfew was imposed in several cities including Kathmandu, Birgunj, Bhairahawa, Butwal, Pokhara, Itahari, and Damak. Additionally, the police and armed forces began going house-by-house near the protests searching for protesters, and raided the Civil Service Hospital where wounded and dying protesters were taken after being shot or otherwise beaten by government forces. Tear gas was shot into the hospital.

A friendly football match between Nepal and Bangladesh that was scheduled for 9 September at the Dasharath Stadium was cancelled because of the events in Nepal.

Talks about restoring the monarchy re-emerged, with former king Gyanendra emerging as a "symbol of resistance for those disillusioned with the current political system", particularly from the royalist opposition to the post Nepali civil war governments. Earlier in the year, monarchists protested, calling for a restoration, ending with a heavy crackdown that caused at least two deaths. However, organizers urged not to resurface pro-monarchy sentiment, nor hold the Nepali flag as they believed it was a royal form of "ultranationalism." Authors and scholars began to debate the actual intention of these comments, and whether protesters really wanted a restoration of the monarchy.

At around 22:00 NPT, the Nepali Army stated that it would "take charge" of the country in the absence of the prime minister to ensure "law and order" is maintained. The press release called for cooperation as they deployed troops later that evening into the early hours of the following day. Later in the evening, the Chief of Army Staff Ashok Raj Sigdel appealed to the agitating groups for talks.

=== 10 September ===
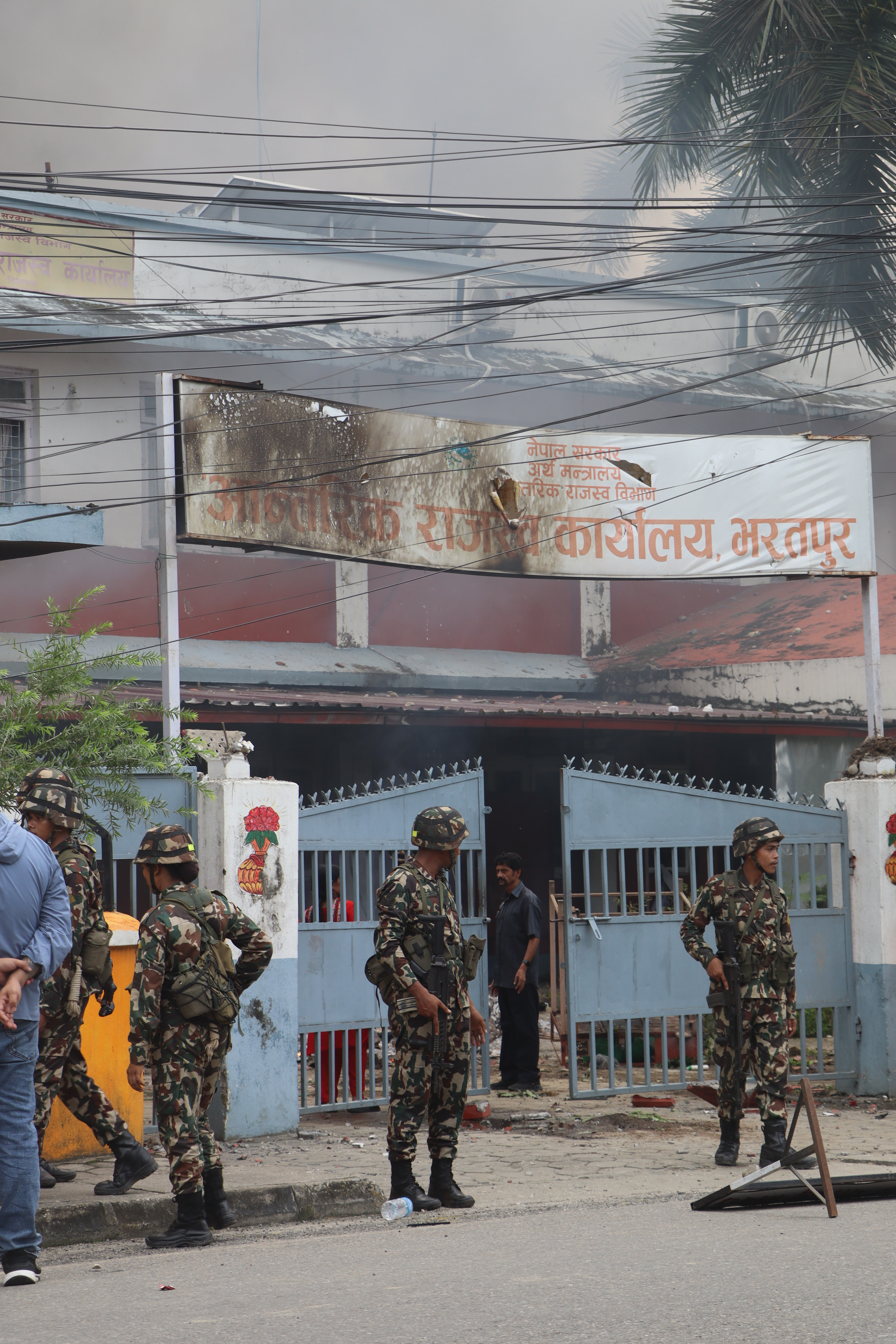
Burnt out revenue office in Chitwan, 9 September 2025

In the early morning, Nepali Army forces were seen patrolling neighborhoods in critical areas. General Sigdel again encouraged protesters to remain peaceful as the government attempts to restore peace. Between approximately 10:00 NPT on 9 September and 22:00 NPT on 10 September, the Army announced detention of 27 individuals on counts of looting, arson, and other "destructive and anarchic activities" and seizing weaponry. Later reports counted 31 firearms.

In some places, protestors continued raiding government buildings and politicians' homes through the night, with one video showing a group of protestors taking firearms from homes, including what is believed to be a GSG-522 carbine and a bolt-action rifle. The pace was slowed down by noon. A group of protestors started cleaning the street near the parliament building that was set on fire the previous day. Many army weapons were captured by protesters. One video included armor vests, L1A1 SLR rifles, 37mm Webley & Scott "Schermuly" grenade launchers, INSAS 1B1 rifles, Lee–Enfield rifles, and Ishapore 1A1 rifles.

Protestors held online discussions on Discord to select an interim leader. Around 10:00 pm NPT, the group voted and selected Sushila Karki. Balen Shah, mayor of Kathmandu, and Kul Man Ghising were other candidates. Balen reportedly did not pick up the phone. Durga Prasai separately met with the army chief, but no concrete conclusion was met. Karki confirmed her willingness to accept the role in an interview with News18.

In Pokhara, two dead bodies were found inside a burned house at Nayabazar and Lakeside.

Police stated that as of 10 September, more than 13,500 prisoners had escaped from prisons nationwide of them, one was Rabi Lamichhane, former home minister of Nepal and convicted to prison for fraud. Soldiers arrested 303 of those prisoners and handed them over to police. Seventy-three rifles were also returned. In Dhading District, two inmates were shot dead and seven injured by soldiers when they tried to flee, while soldiers also thwarted an attempted jailbreak in Kathmandu's main prison.

TIA's closure was extended late in the morning, but eventually resumed operations.

The New York Times reported that more than 100,000 citizens were using Discord, an online communication software, to select a nominee for interim leader. The server, described as "the Parliament of Nepal", had jumped to 145,000 members. The server had reportedly settled on Sushila Karki, the country's former chief justice, and proposed her name for meetings with the Army.

=== 11 September ===
In the morning a meeting was held that included President Ram Chandra Paudel, Nepali Army Chief Ashok Raj Sigdel and Gen Z representatives. The meeting was held at Bhadrakali army headquarters as part of efforts to select an interim leader. The Gen Z group advocated for Sushila Karki to be interim prime minister. Balendra Shah, Kul Man Ghising, and mayor of Dharan, Harka Raj Rai were also considered.

The Communist Party of Nepal (Maoist Centre) announced its support for the protests, with party chairperson Pushpa Kamal Dahal urging protestors to work within the democratic framework.

Meanwhile, the death toll increased to 34, while more than 1,300 people were injured, according to Nepal's Ministry of Health and Population (MoHP).

=== 12 September ===
According to police spokesperson Binod Ghimire, the dead include 21 protesters, nine prisoners, three police officers, and 18 others. Ghimire confirmed that more than 12,500 fugitives remain at large, after escaping from various prisons in Nepal. Some tried to cross into India, where they were apprehended by Indian border forces.

Map of reported protest locations following 4 September ban

Sushila Karki, a former Supreme Court chief justice, was inaugurated as interim prime minister. She became the first female prime minister in the history of Nepal. Shortly afterwards, president Poudel dissolved parliament and set 5 March as the date for the next election.

=== 13 September ===
The curfew was lifted in the Kathmandu area. Prime Minister Karki began visiting injured protesters in hospitals. Deutsche Welle reported that calm appeared to have returned to the streets of the capital, and that normal daily activities had resumed.

== Aftermath ==
=== Casualties and emergency response ===
At least 76 people were killed in the protests and its aftermath. According to the Nepal Army's official report, of the 76 killed, 41 were arson victims, 22 protesters, three police officers, and 10 prisoners who were shot to prevent their escape. On 1 May 2026, Nepal Government officially confirmed that 2,660 were injured during the protest.

Search teams were dispatched to recover bodies from all structures set on fire, according to the MoHP. A day of national mourning for the victims was held on 17 September 2025.

Protests destroyed numerous public offices, destroying equipment of essential services. Spared offices continued to operate normally while burned offices pitched tents and scraped together materials to resume services.

In February 2026, Human Rights Watch, Amnesty International, and the International Commission of Jurists called on the interim government and all parties participating in the March 2026 elections to "commit to end impunity for rights abuses and corruption by upholding the rule of law, including by successfully completing the transitional justice process." Reports on human rights abuses leading up to the Gen Z protests as well as reports on abuses during and since the protests have not been published according to Human Rights Watch.

==== Selected individual injuries ====
Shantanu Dhakal, an 18-year-old student, was shot through his left jaw by police using live ammunition during an anti-corruption protest in Itahari, Nepal, on September 8, 2025. Dhakal was immediately taken to the Teaching Hospital for treatment.

According to Dhakal's report on the YouTube channel EON, he had finished school that day and went to join a peaceful protest in Itahari. He was standing in front of the Itahari Police Station. The protest was held at the Itahari Sub-Metropolitan Office area, and it was calm at first. However, the situation suddenly changed when Dhakal heard gunfire a few meters away. The crowd became unstable, and two students were killed. One died on the spot near the Itahari Sub-Metropolitan City Office, while the other was taken to BP Koirala Institute of Health Sciences in Dharan and later died. Dhakal heard another wave of gunshots and ran about 70 to 80 meters away. He was shot in the left jaw and his left side molars were crushed, but he maintained consciousness. He was taken to the nearest medical center for first aid and then moved to Birat Teaching Hospital by ambulance. He walked to the ambulance while still bleeding. After being discharged from the hospital, he said to his friends who were with him: "There is a limit of pain in human minds, if that exceed any part of human body doesn't feel pain at all". He could not speak for a few weeks because of the injury. He spent three weeks in hospital for surgeries and treatment. Once back home, as he spent time in recovery, he decided to document online his near-death experience and life in the aftermath of the protests.

During his recovery, Dhakal used social media to share his story, including images of himself with a tracheostomy tube and cheek wound. His posts, which included details about the challenges of basic activities like brushing his teeth, provided a raw and personal look at the aftermath of political violence, as well as grabbing the attention of people and the media.

=== Damage to private property ===
In addition to public infrastructure, several private businesses were damaged during these protests. Multiple outlets of Bhatbhateni Supermarket, Nepal's largest retail chains, were vandalized, looted, and set on fire in different locations, partially motivated by the owner of Bhatbhateni Min Bahadur Gurung, having gifted land and a building to the UML party. Kantipur, Nepal's largest TV and radio broadcasters headquarter was also set on fire. Media reports documented extensive structural damage, financial losses, and casualties at some branches.

=== Interim government response ===
According to officials from Sushila Karki's interim government, any family who lost a member in the protests would receive monetary compensation of 1 million Nepalese rupees (equivalent to about US$7,000 as of September 2025), the maximum amount allowed by the law. Those who were injured during the protests would also be compensated. At the same meeting, she called out for unity in order to rebuild the country.

The day Karki took office, on 14 September, she "urged calm and cooperation to rebuild" following the protests. She also condemned the destruction caused by protests and claimed that some of the arson was premeditated. She also criticised those who caused damage and pledged to investigate conspiracies behind the violence, intending to spare nobody. Karki said that she would remain in power for no more than six months.

=== New elections ===
Nationwide elections were set for 5 March 2026. These elections marked the end of the interim government and the formation of a new government. A new online voter-registration system had seen over 915,000 first-time voters sign up, with more than two-thirds of them young people. There was also a surge in new political parties, and the election had 120 different parties participating. Much of the campaigning focused on new candidates seeking to win the Gen Z vote, but established politicians, including former Prime Minister Oli, were on the ballot. There were also three other former prime ministers who were leading major parties. Approximately two-thirds of the lawmakers from the previous parliament (those serving prior to the formation of the interim government) did not run in these elections.

Following its conclusion, The New York Times described the protest as "by far Gen Z's biggest win to date".

=== Arrest of Oli and Lekhak ===
The newly formed Balendra Shah's government (of the Rastriya Swatantra Party political party) arrested former Prime Minister KP Sharma Oli and former Home Minister Ramesh Lekhak over their involvement in crackdown of the protesters based on the recommendation by Karki Commission Report. However, on April 9, 2026, they were both released from custody on a general date following a mandamus order from the Supreme Court of Nepal.

== Reactions ==
=== Domestic ===
==== Government ====
Former Minister of Justice Gobinda Bandi said the social media ban goes against the constitution and basic freedoms, including rights protected by Nepal's constitution and the International Covenant on Civil and Political Rights (ICCPR).

The Rastriya Prajatantra Party (RPP), part of the opposition, condemned the social media ban and the police response to the protests, and called for the immediate dissolution of the current government.

In a Facebook post, Kathmandu's mayor (now Prime Minister) Balendra Shah said he could not attend the protests because of the age limit set by the organizers. However, he believed it was important to listen to their voices. President Ram Chandra Paudel and the Nepalese army appealed for calm and political dialogue.

==== Others ====
Gyanendra, the former King of Nepal, issued a statement condemning the violent crackdown on the protests and calling on the government to listen to the demands of the protesters. He further urged the protest movement to remain peaceful and avoid being hijacked by criminal elements. Various hotels in Pokhara's lakeside area were set on fire during the protests. The Hotel Association Pokhara Nepal called for an investigation on the vandalism and for government compensation, as Pokhara's tourism industry was heavily hit. The Nepalese Gen-Z uprising has challenged the old-elite political system.

In October, Nepalese physicians pleaded to the UN Human Rights Council to investigate the human rights violations against children and health-care personnel. They have asked the UN International Children's Emergency Fund and the WHO to help the victims.

=== International ===
==== Foreign governments ====
The unrest in Nepal impacted activities along the India–Nepal border. Local sources noted that markets had fallen silent, causing larger economic stagnation across neighbouring regions. Shortly after the worries, the Maharashtra State Emergency Operations Centre (SEOC) issued a travel advisory on 9 September requesting Indian citizens not to travel until further notice. It made emergency helplines available and encouraged both Indian and Nepali citizens in Nepal to also remain in place. Early in the morning of 10 September, Air India, IndiGo, SpiceJet, and several other Indian airlines officially cancelled all flights in and out of Tribhuvan International Airport, commonly known as TIA. After TIA was reopened later that day, IndiGo resumed flights. However, sources from inside TIA reported that the airport was still at a standstill, with little communication of updates from authorities.

India's Ministry of External Affairs said it was closely monitoring the protests, expressing grief over the casualties and extending condolences to the victims' families. It also wished a speedy recovery for the injured and advised Indian citizens in Nepal to follow curfew orders and safety guidelines.

The Bangladeshi Ministry of Foreign Affairs stated that it was closely monitoring the situation in Nepal, while expressing condolences to the families of the deceased and wishing recovery to the injured. It also stated that it hoped a "peaceful and constructive dialogue" among "all relevant parties" in the country to resolve any kind of differences.

The military leader of Myanmar, Min Aung Hlaing, stated during a meeting with the State Security and Peace Commission that "[lessons should be learned from the] outside interference [in Nepal]."

==== Intergovernmental organizations ====
United Nations Secretary-General António Guterres's spokesman, Stéphane Dujarric, said the secretary-general was "deeply saddened by the loss of life" and called on the authorities to comply with international human rights law and for the protestors to respect life and property.

Volker Türk, the United Nations High Commissioner for Human Rights, said he was "appalled" by the escalating violence and called on the security forces to exercise the utmost restraint. He also called for an investigation into conduct of the security forces, particularly the deaths of protestors and reports of "disproportionate use of force".

==== Human rights groups ====
Amnesty International condemned the crackdown and called for independent investigation and accountability on 8 September. It called for a de-escalation while urging authorities to "exercise maximum restraint" in its use of force. It supported the protesters rights to protest peacefully and demanded the government heed the "legitimate demands of the youth to end corruption" to reestablish civil liberties.

Human Rights Watch did not immediately make a statement on the protests, but suggested certain actions in a news report on 9 September. Its statements were supported by findings that the Nepali government has "a record of silencing online speech," which fueled growing discontent in younger population. Citing the ban's lifting and rampant militaristic police violence it suggested that "Nepali authorities should promptly and impartially investigate the police use of force and appropriately discipline or prosecute all those responsible for abuses, regardless of rank." Its Asia director, Meenakshi Ganguly, underscored that the police shootings "shows the administration's appalling disregard for the lives of its own citizens and desperate need to suppress criticism." It further cited the UN Basic Principles on the Use of Force and Firearms and tracking of the UN Human Rights Committee to argue that the government's use of live ammunition was extrajudicial.

The International Federation for Human Rights and World Organisation Against Torture released a joint statement condemning the crackdown on peaceful protests on 9 September. It called for the government to "immediately halt all forms of violation and brutality by authorities against protesters," ensure that the ban rollback was permanent through legal means, and to uphold its state party status to the Office of the United Nations High Commissioner for Human Rights (OHCHR) and the International Covenant on Civil and Political Rights (ICCPR) by maintaining "respect [for] the fundamental rights of its people–both online and offline."

== See also ==
- Flood control projects scandal in the Philippines – Similar public response to perceived corruption of and display of wealth by government officials and their families
- July Uprising – Similarly spearheaded by Gen Z and resulted in the overthrow of the government
- Kenya Finance Bill protests – Also known as the Gen Z protests
- Myanmar protests (2021–present) – Similar anti-government protests launched in response to the ruling State Administration Council
- Nomenklatura – High bureaucrats/ruling class in Eastern Bloc countries
- 2022 Sri Lankan protests – Protests against the Sri Lankan government
- August 2025 Indonesian protests – Simultaneous protests similarly spurred by criticism of inequality and police brutality
- 2025 Kenyan protests – Anti-government protests in Kenya in 2025

=== Nepal ===
- 2025 Nepalese pro-monarchy protests
- 2026 Nepalese general election – 2026 election for members of the House of Representatives
- Corruption in Nepal
- TikTok ban in Nepal – Restriction of access to TikTok by the government of Nepal
