= List of foreign criminals in Nepal =

This is a list of notable foreign criminals living, arrested or imprisoned in Nepal. There are about 1000 foreigners in prison in Nepal. Most of them are from India followed by Bhutan, Bangladesh, Pakistan, China, Africa, Europe and America. They are serving for kidnap, drug trafficking, murder, wildlife poaching or IT fraud. About 100 inmates are jailed in Jagannath Deval jail in Kathmandu.

== List ==
- Charles Sobhraj was arrested and is imprisoned in Nepal for killing multiple people.
- Arij Khan- a member of Indian bomb blast was arrested in Nepal on 2018.
- Abdul Subhan Qureshi a member of Indian bomb blast lived in Nepal from 2008 to 2015. He was arrested in India in 2018.
- Yasin Bhatkal-a convicted Indian Islamist terrorist, was arrested in Nepal-India border at Raxual in 2013. He was transferred to India where he was given a death sentence by Indian court.
- Khaja Moideen, an operative of Islamic state from Tamil Nadu (India) hid in Nepal. He was arrested in Delhi, India in 2020.
- Abdul Samad, an operative of Islamic state from Tamil Nadu (India) hid in Nepal. He was arrested in Delhi, India in 2020.
- Syed Ali Nawaz, an operative of Islamic state from Tamil Nadu (India) hid in Nepal. He was arrested in Delhi, India in 2020.
- Syed Abdul Karim Tunda, a bomb maker and master mind of 1993 Indian bombing was arrested in Nepal-India border at Banbasa in 2013.
- Yunus Ansari, an associate of Dawood Ibrahim was shot in the Central jail in Kathmandu. He was serving for carrying fake Indian currency.
- Mohammed Arshad Cheema, a Pakistani diplomat, was arrested in 2001 in possession of 16 kg RDX. He was expelled from country in 24 hours.
