= Salyan, Solukhumbu =

Salyan, Solukhumbu सल्यान
- Village development committee
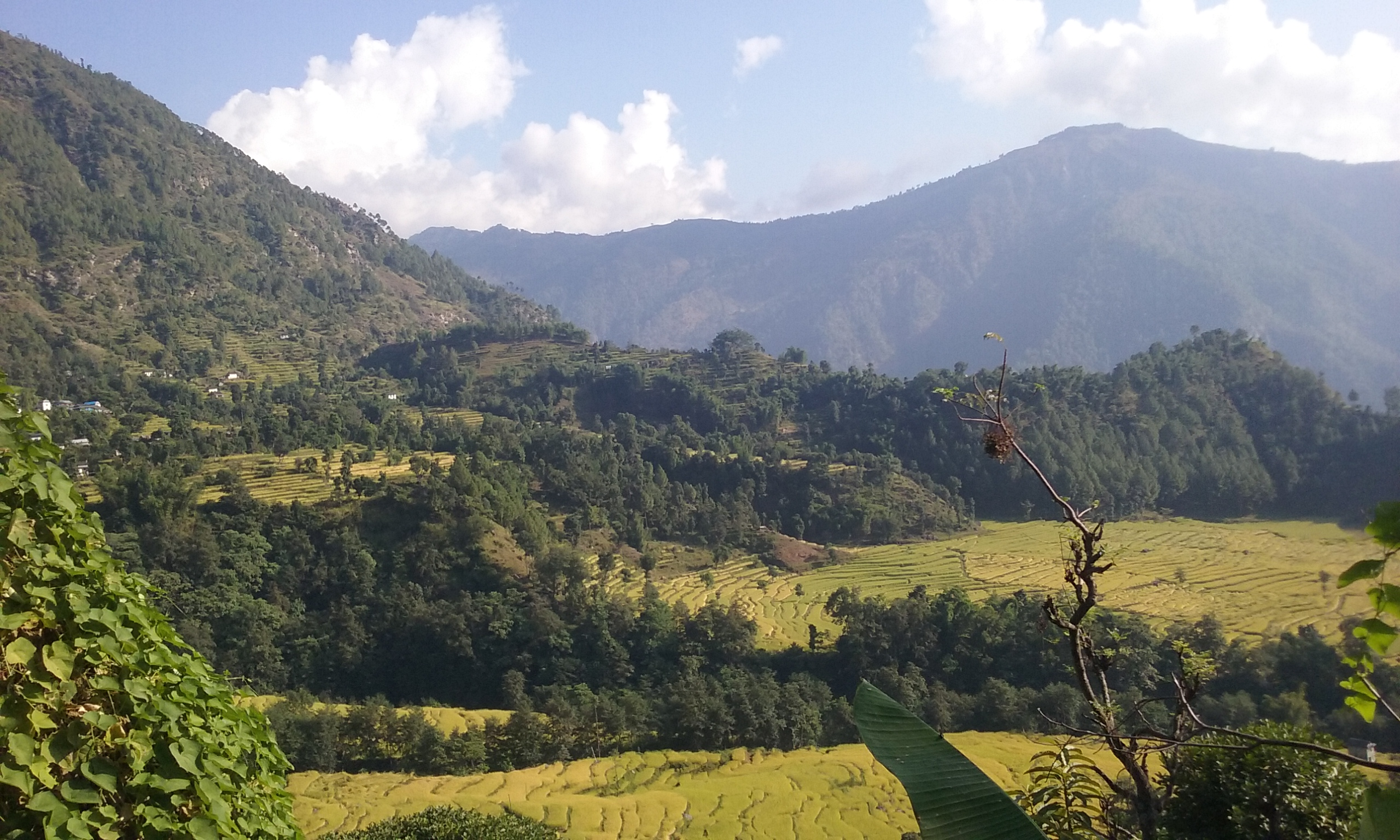
- Salyan Fedi ricefield and portion of Dyamde ricefield

- Location in Nepal
- Coordinates: 27.38°N 86.60°E
- Country: Nepal
- Zone: Sagarmatha Zone
- District: Solukhumbu District

Population (1991)
  - Total: 5,307
- Time zone: UTC+5:45 (Nepal Time)

Salyan, Solukhumbu was a village development committee in Solukhumbu District in the Sagarmatha Zone of north-eastern Nepal. At the time of the 1991 Nepal census it had a population of 5307 people living in 1034 individual households.

It is now part of Nechasalyan Rural Municipality.

== Geography ==
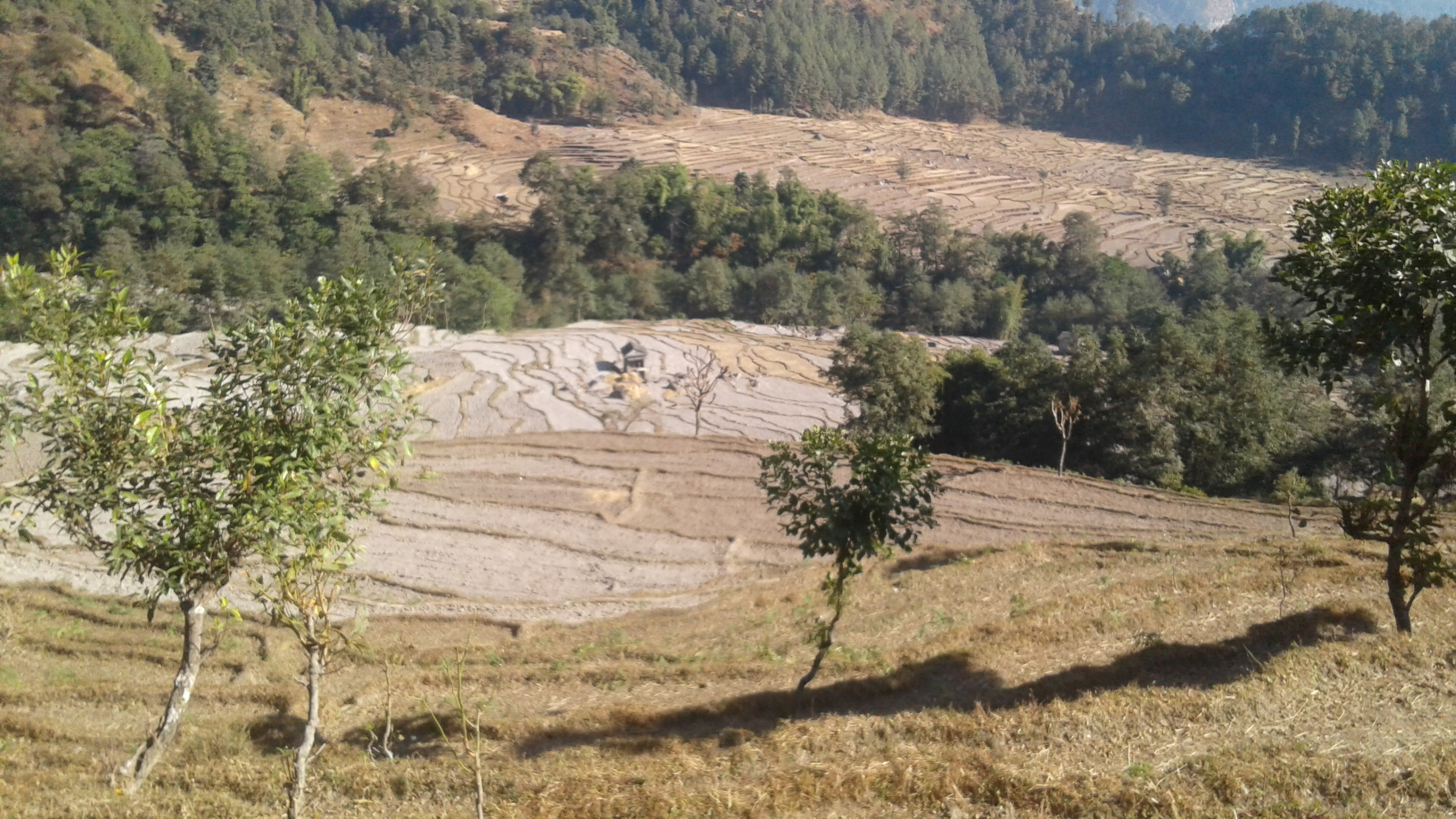
Salyan Fedi village and Dyamde ricefield basin

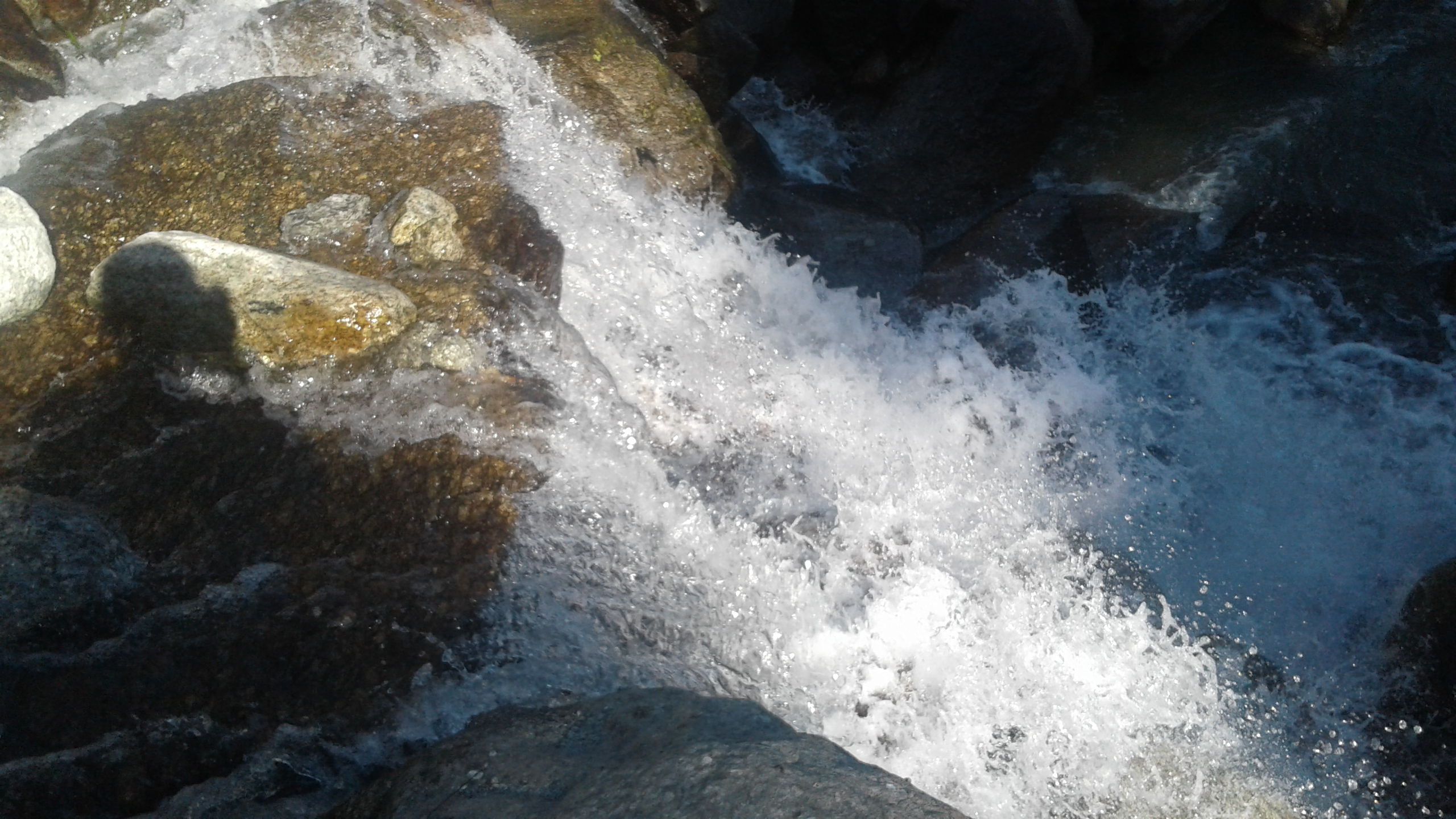
Thade Khola river in Salyan Junbesi village
