= Bal Bahadur KC =

Nepalese politician

- बलबहादुर केसी

Minister for Culture, Tourism and Civil Aviation of Nepal
- In office July 25, 2001 – ----
- Monarch: Gyanendra of Nepal
- Prime Minister: Sher Bahadur Deuba

Ministry of Housing and Physical Planning
- In office June 30, 1999 – ---
- Monarch: Birendra of Nepal
- Prime Minister: Krishna Prasad Bhattarai

Ministry of General Administration and Labor
- In office May 31, 1999 – ---
- Monarch: Birendra of Nepal
- Prime Minister: Krishna Prasad Bhattarai

Minister of Youth, Sports and Culture of Nepal
- In office --, 1997 – ----
- Monarch: Birendra of Nepal
- Prime Minister: Sher Bahadur Deuba

Member of Legislature Parliament of Nepal from Solukhumbu District Constituency No. 1
- Incumbent
- Assumed office 2013

Personal details
- Born: July 17, 1953 A.D. Salyan, Solukhumbu
- Party: Nepali Congress

Bal Bahadur KC (Nepali: बलबहादुर केसी) was a former minister of Nepal. Currently, he is the member of working committee of Nepali Congress. He has a great influence in Nepali congress Party as well as Nepali Politics.

== Family ==
He was born on July 17, 1953, in Salyan VDC, Solukhumbu District to father Lal Bahadur KC and mother Maheshwari KC.He is Married to Reena Upreti Kc who is also former president of Free Student Union of Padmakanya Multiple Campus also former central committee member of Nepal Student Union and former central committee member of Nepal Woman Association (नेपाल महिला संघ) which are the students and women wings of Nepali congress party. .

== Education ==
He has done his M.A. in political science from Tribhuvan University.

== Political life ==
=== Student leader and democracy activist ===
Bal Bhadur Kc was elected as the president of the Free Student Union of Mahendra Ratna Campus, Tahachal in 1970 to 1972. Bal Bahadur Kc was appointed as an Executive Chairman by BP Koirala(Party President) in 2035 B.S.He led the 2036 B.S mass movement in student frame and led Nepal Students Union as an executive chairman. He was the president of Nepal Students Union from 1983 to 1987.

- He worked as a central operation committee member of Satyagraha movement of Nepali Congress.
- He worked as a central operation committee member of mass movement of 1989 also called as 2046 JanaAandolan.

=== Way to the Parliament(2048 BS) ===
He was elected as a Parliament Member in 2048 B.S.(1991 AD) from Solukhumbu District.

- He has been a central committee member of Nepali congress since 2049 BS to Present.

=== Way to the Parliament(2051 BS) ===
He was again elected as a Parliament Member in 2051 B.S.(1994 AD) from Solukhumbu District.

- He became the First Sports Minister of Nepal.He was appointed as Minister of Youth, Sports and Culture of Nepal.

- He became the Minister of General Administration and Labor in 2056 BS.(1999 AD)
- He also became Minister of Housing and Physical Planning

in 2056 BS.(1999 AD)

=== Way to the Parliament(2056 BS) ===
He was again elected as a member of Parliament in 2056 BS.(1999 AD)

- Later he became a Minister for Culture, Tourism and Civil Aviation of Nepal in 2058 BS.(2001)

=== Mass Movemoment 2062/2063BS(2006 AD) ===
He played a major role in 2062/2063 Jana Aandolan. He had a role of commander to handle the area of chabahil kathmandu.

=== Way to the Parliament(2070 BS) ===
He was elected as Member of Legislature Parliament of Nepal from Solukhumbu District.He is the one of parliament member to sign on constitution of Nepal 2072.(2015 AD)He has a major role in making the constitution of Nepal 2072.

== Remarkable Work For a Country ==
- He had contributed to reform a Pashupatinath Temple.(World Heritage Site)
- He implemented the Mayadevi Temple Lumbini Master Plan.
- He build a Dharmashala in Banaras India.

He played a vital role to declare Pasang Lahmu Sherpa as a National Hero.He upgraded the Phaplu and Lukla airport and has done a remarkable work in tourism avaiation and cultural sector.

- He also established the pollution control center in Mt.Everest (World Highest Mountain)

He played a vital role in development of solukhumbu District and also a country.He is known as a guardian of Solukhumbu.
