= TikTok ban in Nepal =

Restriction of access to TikTok by the government of Nepal

A ban of the social media and video platform TikTok began in Nepal on November 13, 2023, with the government attributing it to the disruption of social harmony. It was lifted in August 2024.

== Background ==
Nepal has over 2.2 million TikTok users. Nepal banned TikTok due to concerns over its contents' impact on society. Home Minister Narayan Kaji highlighted worries about harmful content and youth influence. Despite failed attempts to address these concerns with TikTok directly, the government imposed the ban to protect public interests and promote responsible social media use.

== Impact ==
The ban on TikTok in Nepal has sparked concerns like hindrances to business promotions, speculation about political motives, discontent among users reliant on the platform, and criticism regarding democratic principles and freedom of expression.

== Reactions ==
=== Protests ===
The ban on TikTok in Nepal had sparked widespread protests and debates across the country, both offline and on social media platforms. Citizens conducted street protests to voice their opposition to the ban, highlighting their concerns about freedom of expression and the impact on livelihoods. Additionally, a petition challenging the ban was filed in the Supreme Court, although an interim order was not granted.

=== Lifting ===
In August 2024, the ban was lifted after TikTok reached an agreement with government authorities to help identify misuse of the app in real-time and monitor cybercrimes.

== See also ==
- September 2025 Nepalese protests
