= Corruption in Nepal =

Corruption in Nepal (Nepali: नेपालमा भ्रष्टाचार) is widespread and extends to every sector from the government to the judiciary, police, health services, and education.

== Overview ==
Transparency International's 2025 Corruption Perceptions Index, which scored 182 countries on a scale from 0 ("highly corrupt") to 100 ("very clean"), gave Nepal a score of 34. When ranked by score, Nepal ranked 109th among the 182 countries in the Index, where the country ranked first is perceived to have the most honest public sector. For comparison with regional scores, the best score among those countries of the Asia Pacific region that appeared in the Index (Note: Afghanistan, Australia, Bangladesh, Bhutan, Brunei Darussalam, Cambodia, China, Fiji, Hong Kong, India, Indonesia, Japan, North Korea, South Korea, Laos, Malaysia, Maldives, Mongolia, Myanmar, Nepal, New Zealand, Pakistan, Papua New Guinea, Philippines, Singapore, Solomon Islands, Sri Lanka, Taiwan, Thailand, Timor-Leste, Vanuatu, Vietnam) was 84, the average score was 45 and the worst score was 15. For comparison with worldwide scores, the best score was 89 (ranked 1), the average score was 42, and the worst score was 9 (ranked 181, in a two-way tie).

== Notable scandals ==
- Tax stamp scandal.
- Tax Settlement Commission scandal – for corruption of 10.02 billion Nepalese rupees (NPR).
- Cooperative scandal in Nepal
- Visit visa extortion scandal
- Bhutanese refugees scam
- Lalita Niwas Land Scam

== See also ==
- Commission for the Investigation of Abuse of Authority
- 2025 Nepalese Gen Z protests
