= Central Jail Kathmandu =

Jail in Nepal

Central Jail
- Location within Kathmandu Location within Bagmati Province Location within Nepal
- Location: Nepal; 27.69732°N 85.31263°E
- Capacity: 1250
- Population: 2750 (2020)
- Opened: 1971 BS (1914–1915)

Central Jail (Nepali: केन्द्रिय कारागार, Kendriya Karagar) is the largest prison facility of Nepal. It was established in 1971 BS (1914–1915). It is located near Newroad of central Kathmandu. The jail is also called Bhadragol jail (भद्रगोल कारागार). To the east of the jail lies the office of the drinking water corporation, Bhotebahal in the west, office of Kathmandu metropolitan in the north. This jail occupies an area of 42 ropanies (about 2.2 hectare). Inside the compound lies Bhadra Jail, Women Jail and Central Jail. There are nine blocks in Central Jail, three blocks in Bhadra Jail and three in the Women Jail. In 2070 BS (2013–2014), a hospital was also set up inside the jail for inmates. A small textile factory with 74 machines has also been set up inside the jail.

The jail has the capacity for 1250 inmates but it hosts 2,750 prisoners including 350 foreign prisoners. There are plans to expand the jail by relocating it to Nuwakot.

== Notable inmates ==
- Durgananda Jha, following an attempt to bomb King Mahendra in 1964. He was executed inside the jail later.
- Charles Sobhraj, for murder of multiple people. He was listed to be free due to COVID-19 vulnerability, but the decision has not been executed.
- Ram Prasad Rai, political prisoner.
- Chudamani Upreti aka Gore, mastermind of the biggest gold smuggling racket in Nepal.
- Yunus Ansari, an associate of Dawood Ibrahim was shot in the jail. He was serving for carrying fake Indian currency.
- Tsongkha Lhamo Tsering - Tibetan freedom fighter, imprisoned with eight other Tibetans around 1974 after ending their resistance operations in Mustang, Nepal.

== See also ==
- List of prisons in Nepal
