= Rautahat =

Village development committee in Sagarmatha Zone, Nepal

Rautahat रौतहट
- Village development committee
- Location in Nepal
- Coordinates: 26.57°N 86.53°E
- Country: Nepal
- Province: Madhesh Province
- District: Saptari District

Population (2011 (2068))
  - Total: 3,612
- Time zone: UTC+5:45 (Nepal Time)

Rautahat is a VDC located in Saptari district of Nepal. At the time of the 2011 Nepal Census it had a population of 3612 people living in 660 individual households. Jung Bahadur Rana died there in 1877.
