= Nakhu Jail =

Jail in Nepal

- Location within Kathmandu Location within Bagmati Province Location within Nepal
- Location: Kathmandu, Nepal; 27.663°N 85.3024°E
- Capacity: 500
- Opened: 1950 (2007 BS)

Nakhu Jail (Nepali:नख्खु कारागार, Nakhu Karagar) is a jail in Nepal that was established in 1950 (2007 BS) in the existing, money printing area (Taksar department) in Lalitpur District. The facility has an area of 35 ropanies and 12 ana (about 1.8 hectares). There is a road to the east of the jail, a school in the west, residential area in the north and Nakhu river in the south.

There are two separate blocks for males and females in the jail. Each block has the sanctioned capacity to accommodate 250 inmates. There were plans to upgrade the jail to accommodate 1,000 inmates in 2020 (2077 BS) but this was postponed. There is also a Community Rehabilitation Center and a Drug Rehabilitation Center inside the jail. A psychiatric hospital was announced in 2017, to be completed by 2018.

== Notable inmates ==
- Mohammad Aftab Alam - suspended member of the House of Representatives on charges of production of explosives and murder.
- Rabi Lamichhane - co-operative scam case convict.
- KP Sharma Oli - political prisoner.
- Padma Ratna Tuladhar - political prisoner.

== Jailbreaks ==
- C. P. Mainali escaped the jail when he was taken as political prisoner
- A British inmate escaped the jail in October 2018. He was arrested the next day.
- During the 2025 Nepalese Gen Z protests, the prison was attacked and set on fire by protesters on 9 September, triggering a jailbreak that led to the escape of all inmates.

== See also ==
- List of prisons in Nepal
