= Rajdevi =

Rajdevi राजदेवी
- Municipality
- Location in Nepal
- Coordinates: 27.77°N 85.32°E
- Country: Nepal
- Development Region: Central
- District: Rautahat
- Province: Province No. 2
- Established: 2016 A.D. (2073 B.S.)

Government
  - Mayor: Bhikhari Prasad Yadav (CPN (US))
  - Deputy Mayor: Raj Kumari Devi (CPN (US))

Area
  - Total: 28.21 km^{2} (10.89 sq mi)

Population (2011)
  - Total: 31,212
  - Density: 1,106/km^{2} (2,866/sq mi)
  - Religions: Hindu Muslim Christian

Languages
  - Local: Bajjika
- Time zone: UTC+5:45 (NST)
- Postal Code: 44500
- Area code: 055
- Website: http://www.rajdevimun.gov.np/

Rajdevi (Nepali: राजदेवी) is a municipality in Rautahat District, a part of Province No. 2 in Nepal. It was formed in 2016 occupying current 9 sections (wards) from previous 9 former VDCs. It occupies an area of 28.21 km^{2} with a total population of 31,212.
