= Siddhi Mishra =

Mountaineer

Siddhi Mishra is the youngest person in the world to have climbed the Everest Base Camp (EBC) in Nepal, which is situated at an altitude of 5364 meters above sea level. Expedition Himalaya awarded her a certificate, and her name was featured in the 2024 India Book of Records.

== Early life ==
Siddhi was born in the city of Bhopal, Madhya Pradesh. Her mother, Bhawna Dehariya, is also a mountaineer who climbed to the summit of Mount Everest in 2019. She was honored with the Guinness World Records title for promoting and popularizing the Indian Himalayas with the Himalayan Mountaineering Institute on August 15, 2020 (Independence Day). She is also the vice president and brand ambassador of Jan Parishad. In 2020, Bhawna was awarded the Devi Award by chief minister Kamal Nath of Madhya Pradesh in Indore. Siddhi's father is Mahim Mishra.

== Journey to EBC ==
Siddhi began her journey to EBC with her parents on March 12, 2024. This journey covered about 53 kilometers from Lukla, located on the northeastern edge of Everest. Siddhi and her mother arrived in Lukla from Kathmandu on March 12, where the temperature was 2-4 degrees Celsius. They then traveled on foot to Phakding, where the temperature ranged from 2 to -2 degrees, on the same day. On March 13, they trekked from Phakding to Namche Bazaar, which is at an altitude of 3440 meters with temperatures between 2 and -6 degrees Celsius. After a day of acclimatization, on March 15, they trekked from Namche Bazaar to Tengboche, at an altitude of 3860 meters, in a wind chill of minus 12 degrees Celsius. On March 16, the fifth day of the trek, they traveled from Deboche (3820m) to Dingboche (4410m), where the temperature ranged from 2 to 10 degrees Celsius. On the seventh day, they trekked from Dingboche to Lobuche. On March 19, the eighth day, Siddhi and Bhawna reached Gorak Shep, the last village on the route to Everest Base Camp. Gorak Shep is situated above a frozen lake covered with sand at an altitude of 5146 meters, with temperatures ranging from -7 to -16 degrees Celsius. On March 22, the duo reached Everest Base Camp at an altitude of 5164 meters.

During their journey, the family encountered a new landmark at the base camp, a signboard featuring images of Hillary and Tenzing, which was erected by the Khumbu Pasang Lhamu Rural Municipality as a symbol of welcome for visitors. Siddhi completed the EBC trek in 10 days on March 22 and was awarded a certificate by Expedition Himalaya. Siddhi completed this trek with her mother under the banner of the 'Beti Bachao, Beti Padhao' campaign in collaboration with the Department of Women and Child Development, Government of Madhya Pradesh.
