= Phakding =

- Village
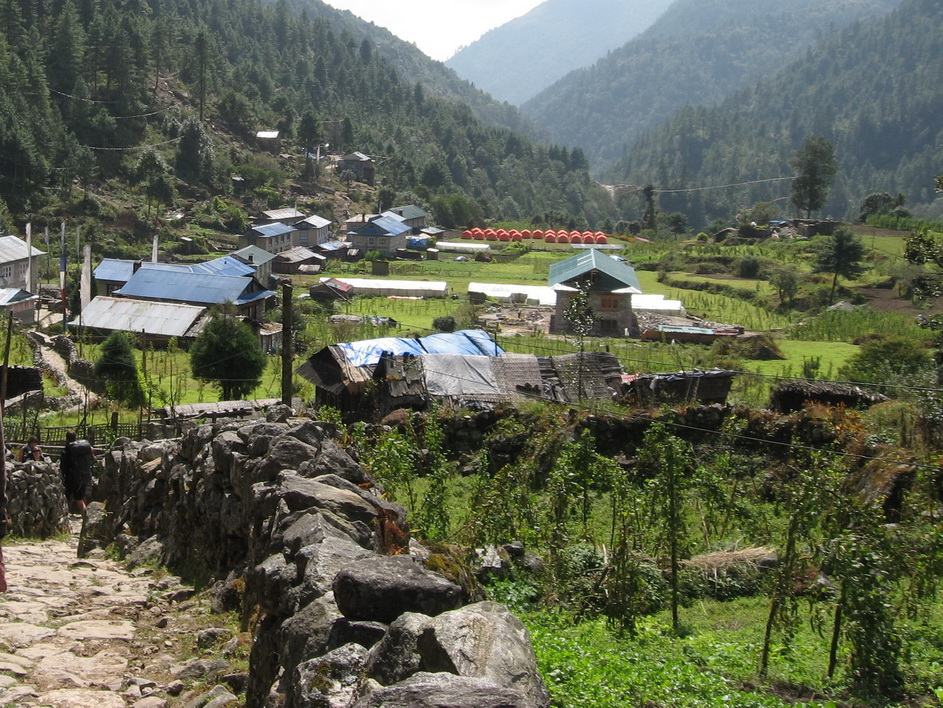
- Trail exiting the village of Phakding leading to Lukla.

- Location in Nepal Phakding (Nepal)
- Coordinates: 27°45′N 86°43′E
- Country: Nepal
- Province: Province No. 1
- District: Solukhumbu District
- Rural municipality: Khumbu Pasanglhamu

Government
  - Type: Ward division
- Elevation: 2,610 m (8,560 ft)
- Time zone: UTC+5:45 (Nepal Time)
- Area code: 038

Phakding is a small village in the Khumbu region of Nepal. It lies in the Dudh Kosi river valley just north of Lukla and south of Monjo, at an altitude of 2,610 m. It has been a UNESCO World Heritage Site since 1979. Phakding has a population of 550 locals, mostly Sherpa and Tamang. All of these people belong to Tibetan Buddhism and pray in a small Gompa at the centre of the village. Phakding lies on ward no 3 of Khumbu Pasanglhamu Rural Municipality.

The trail starts at Lukla and Phakding is often the main stopping point for trekkers on their way to Mount Everest via the Gokyo Ri route or Tengboche route.

The primary function of the village is to support the tourism industry and as such consists of a number of guesthouses. There are around 25 hotels ranging from basic homestay to 4-start Luxury hotels in Phakding. The village can accommodate a maximum of 300 tourists at one time.

Phakding

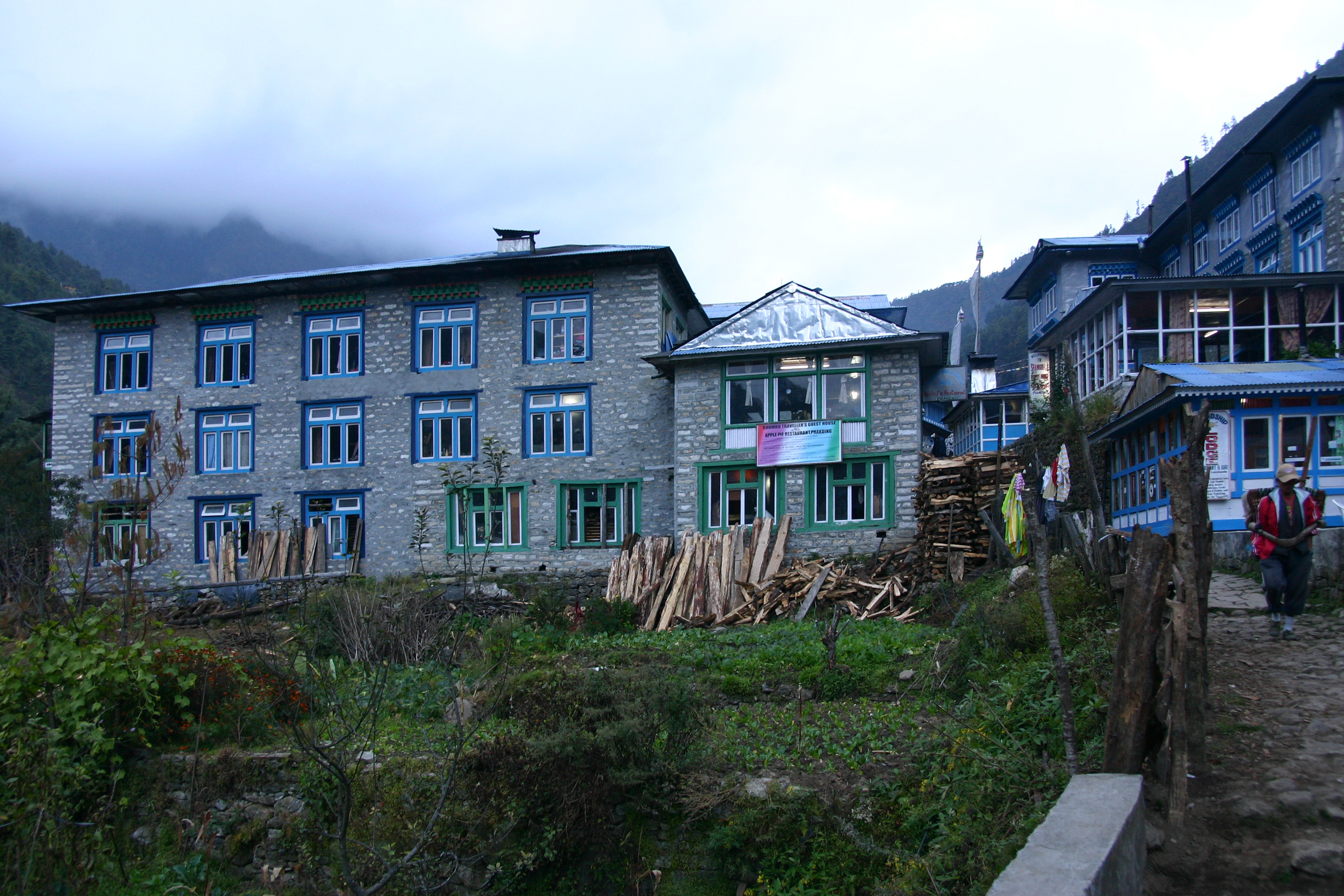

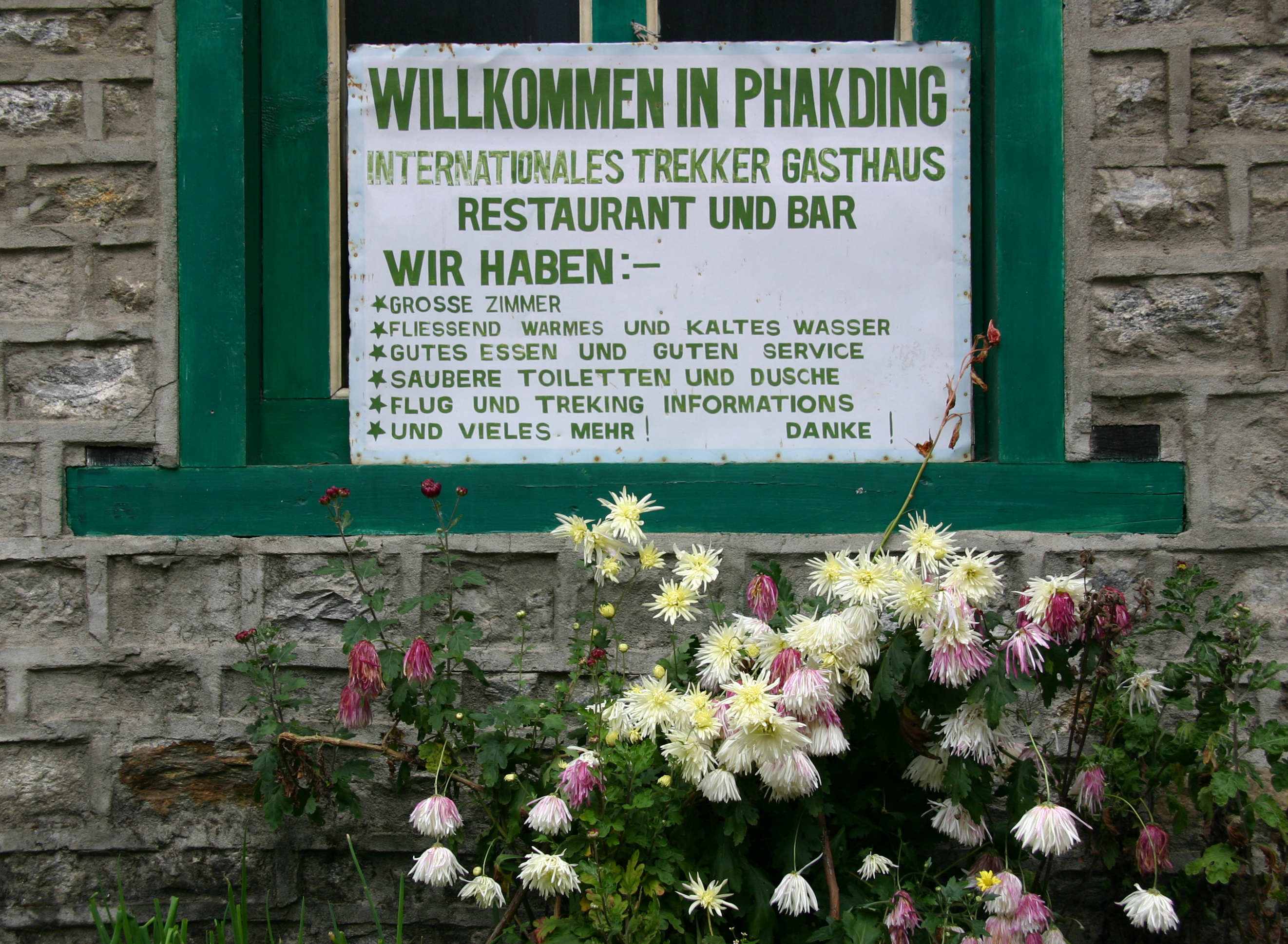

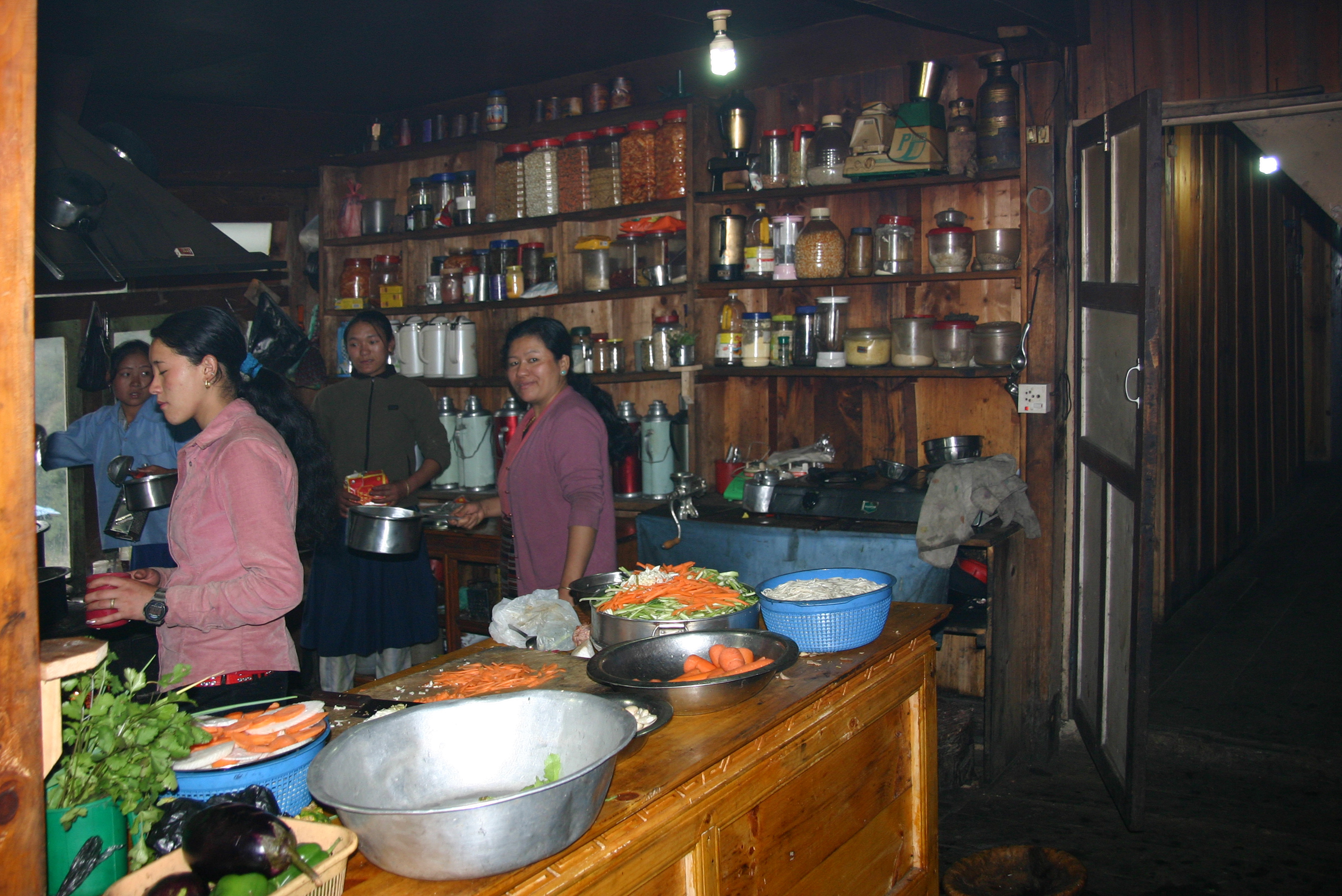

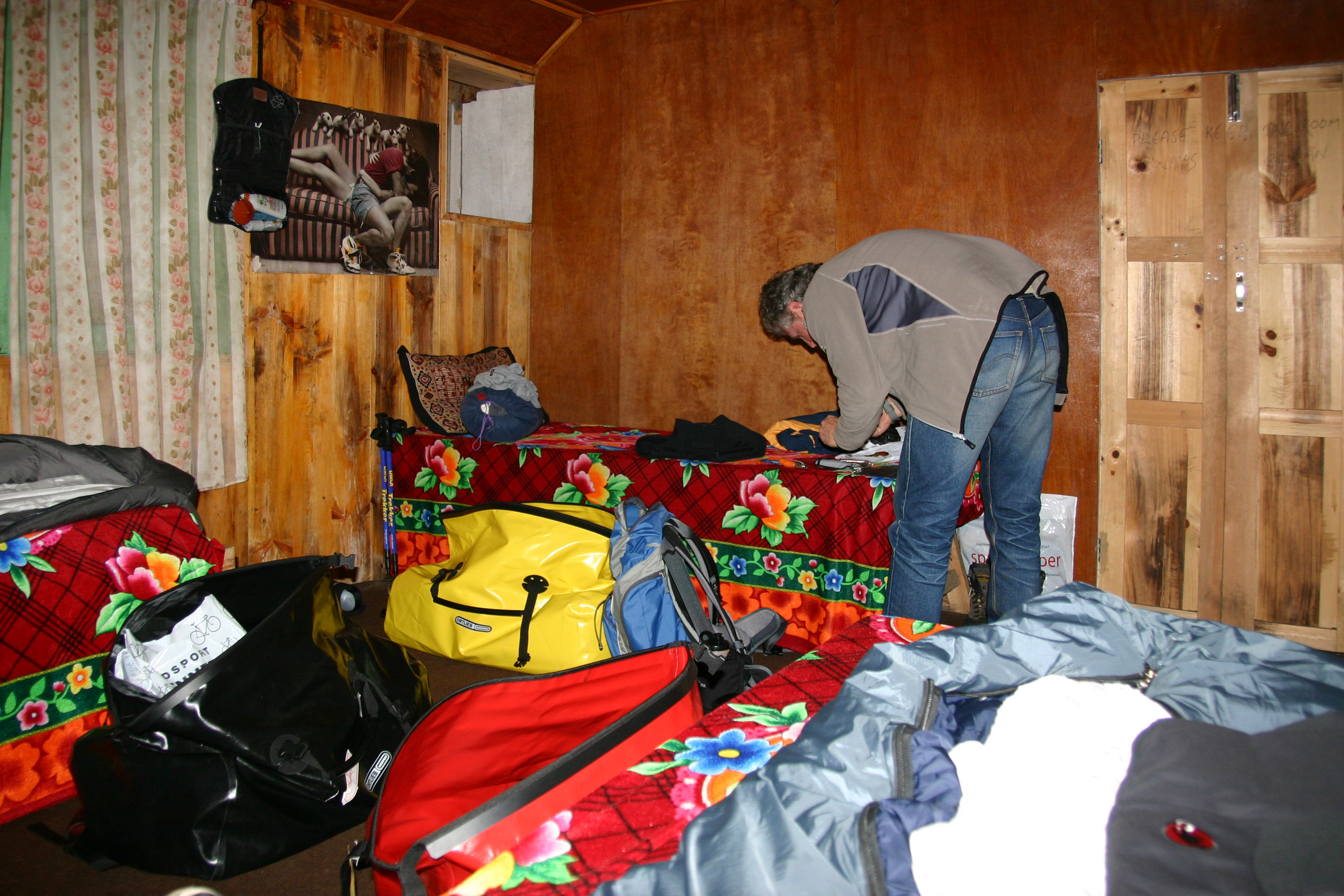

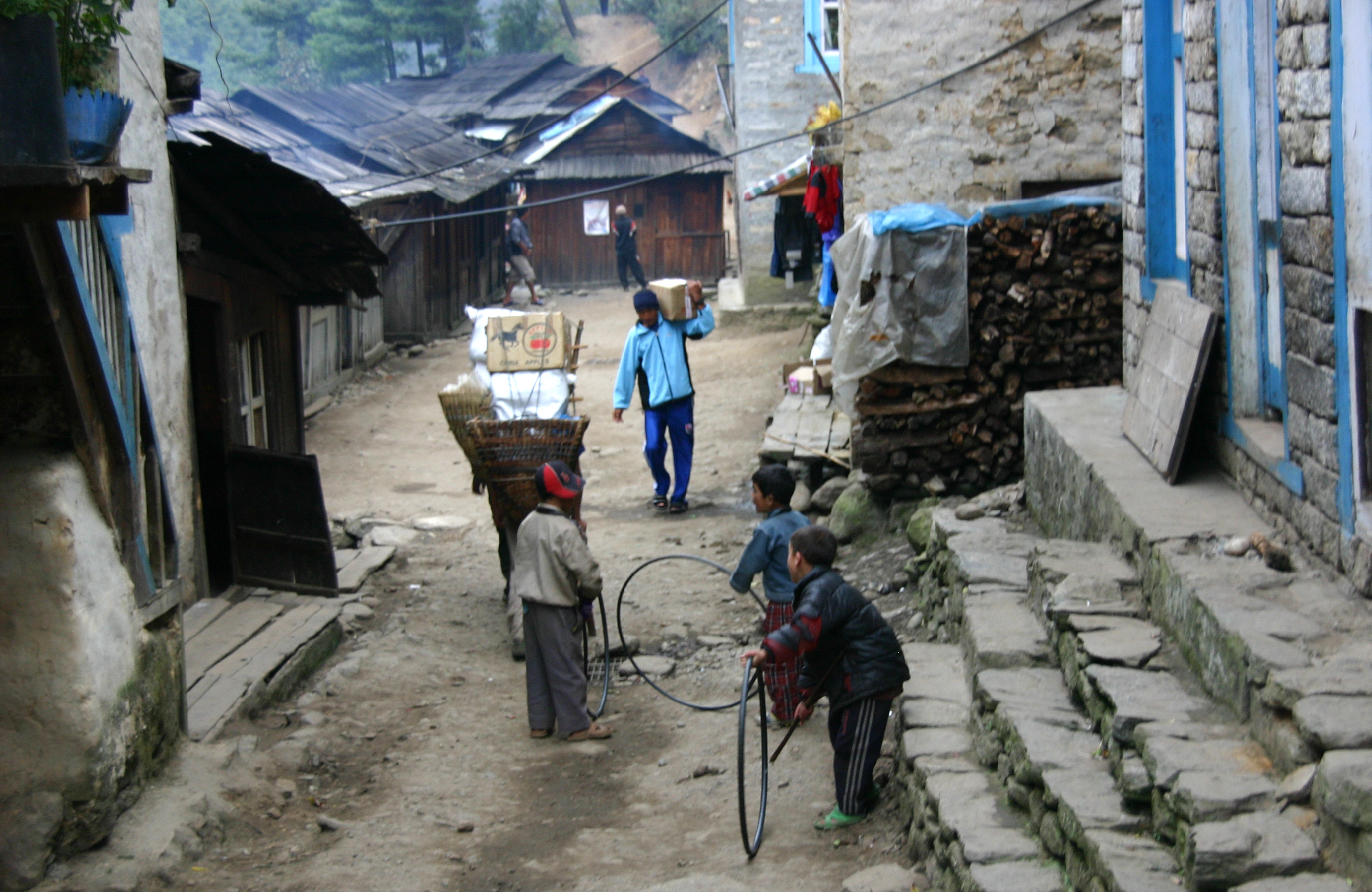

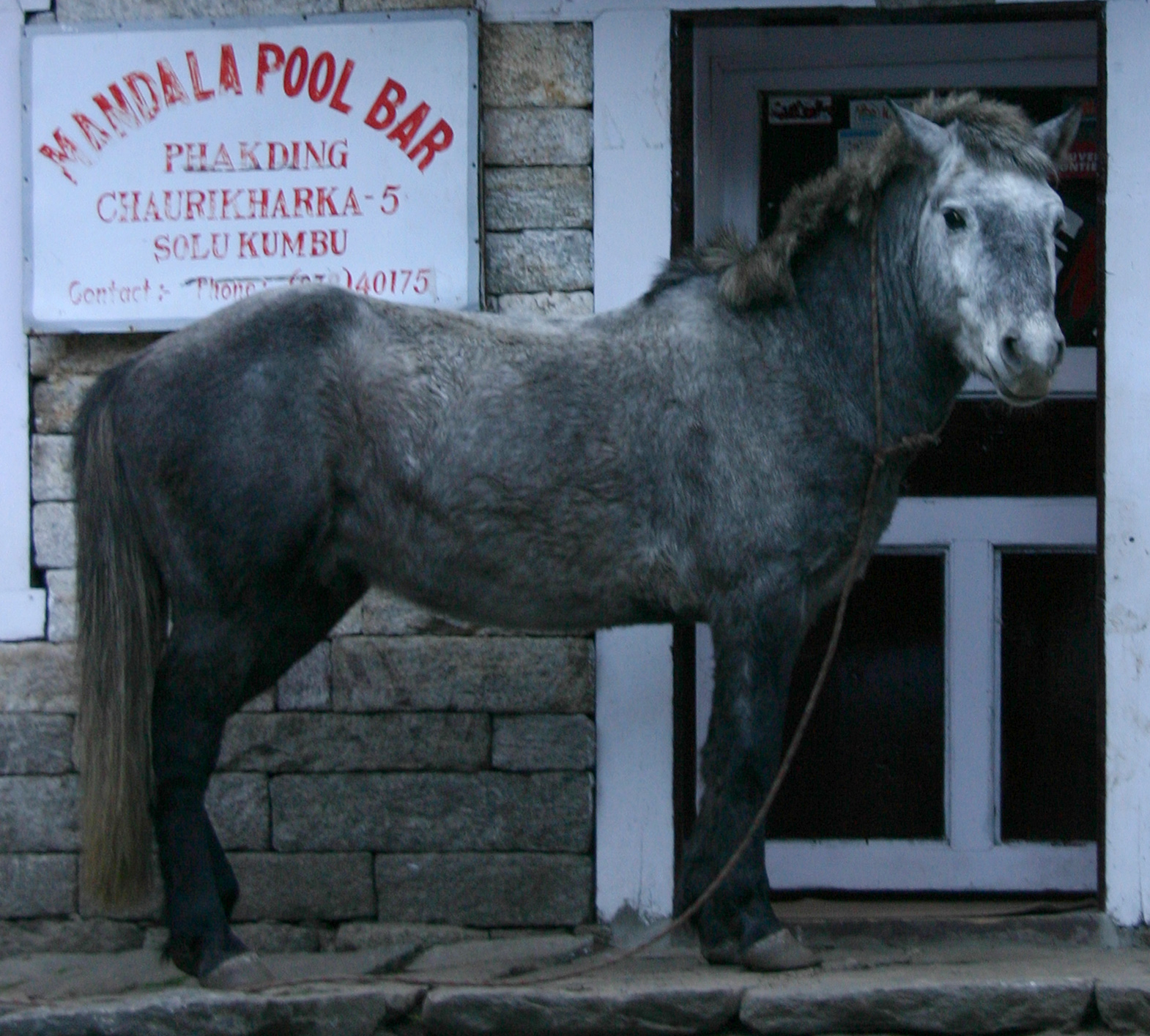

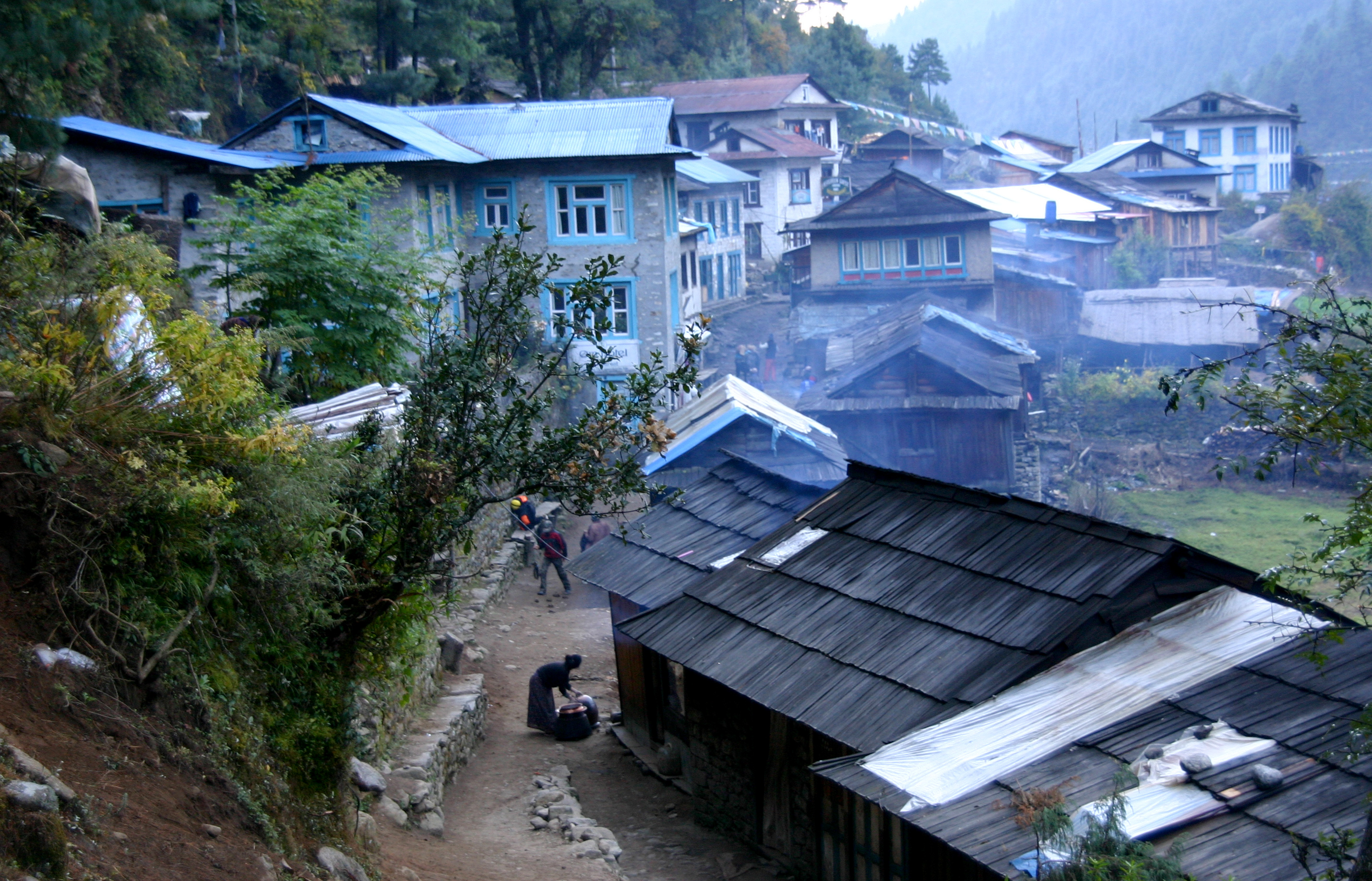

== Climate ==
Climate data for Phakding (Chaurikharka), elevation 2,619 m (8,593 ft)
Month	Jan	Feb	Mar	Apr	May	Jun	Jul	Aug	Sep	Oct	Nov	Dec	Year
Mean daily maximum °C (°F)	9.8 (49.6)	11.0 (51.8)	13.6 (56.5)	18.1 (64.6)	19.2 (66.6)	19.5 (67.1)	19.2 (66.6)	19.6 (67.3)	18.3 (64.9)	17.5 (63.5)	14.0 (57.2)	11.3 (52.3)	15.9 (60.7)
Daily mean °C (°F)	4.0 (39.2)	5.4 (41.7)	8.3 (46.9)	12.1 (53.8)	13.6 (56.5)	15.3 (59.5)	15.6 (60.1)	15.6 (60.1)	14.5 (58.1)	12.3 (54.1)	8.1 (46.6)	5.4 (41.7)	10.9 (51.5)
Mean daily minimum °C (°F)	−1.5 (29.3)	−0.3 (31.5)	3.0 (37.4)	6.0 (42.8)	8.3 (46.9)	11.3 (52.3)	12.1 (53.8)	11.6 (52.9)	10.6 (51.1)	7.0 (44.6)	2.2 (36.0)	−0.5 (31.1)	5.8 (42.5)
Average precipitation mm (inches)	18.3 (0.72)	30.3 (1.19)	27.0 (1.06)	60.1 (2.37)	106.7 (4.20)	321.5 (12.66)	583.1 (22.96)	570.1 (22.44)	297.7 (11.72)	63.6 (2.50)	13.0 (0.51)	14.7 (0.58)	2,106.1 (82.91)
Source 1: FAO
Source 2: Agricultural Extension in South Asia (precipitation 1976–2005)

=== Hotels/Lodges/Tea house in Phakding ===
Phakding is Popular overnight station for many travelers who are trekking in to Everest region. Phakding is 7.5km from Lukla and also below the elevation of Lukla. So, it is considered as good station for first day overnight.

- Mountain Lodges of Nepal - Phakding
- International Trekker’s Guest House & Restaurant
- Green Village Guest House &Restaurant
- See You Lodge & Restaurant
- Darjeeling Exotic Lodge Restaurant and Bar
- Sherpa Eco Home Lodge
- New Royal Sherpa Lodge Restaurant and bar
- Sherpa Guide Lodge
- Snowland Hotel & Restaurant
- Buddha Lodge
- Four Seasons Lodge and Restaurant
- Shangri-La
- Khumbu Traveler's Guest House Phakding
- Tashi Inn Lodge, Restaurant & Khmbu Bar
- Kalapathar Lodge
- Trekker's Lodge & Restaurant
- Everest Bakery Phakding
- THE IRISH BAR And Phakding View Point Cafe
- Himalayan Adventure Guest House
- Tribeni Lodge Restaurant and Bar

== See also ==
- Everest Base Camp
- Lukla
- Namche Bazar
