= Monjo, Nepal =

Village in Nepal

Coordinates: 27°47′N 86°43′E

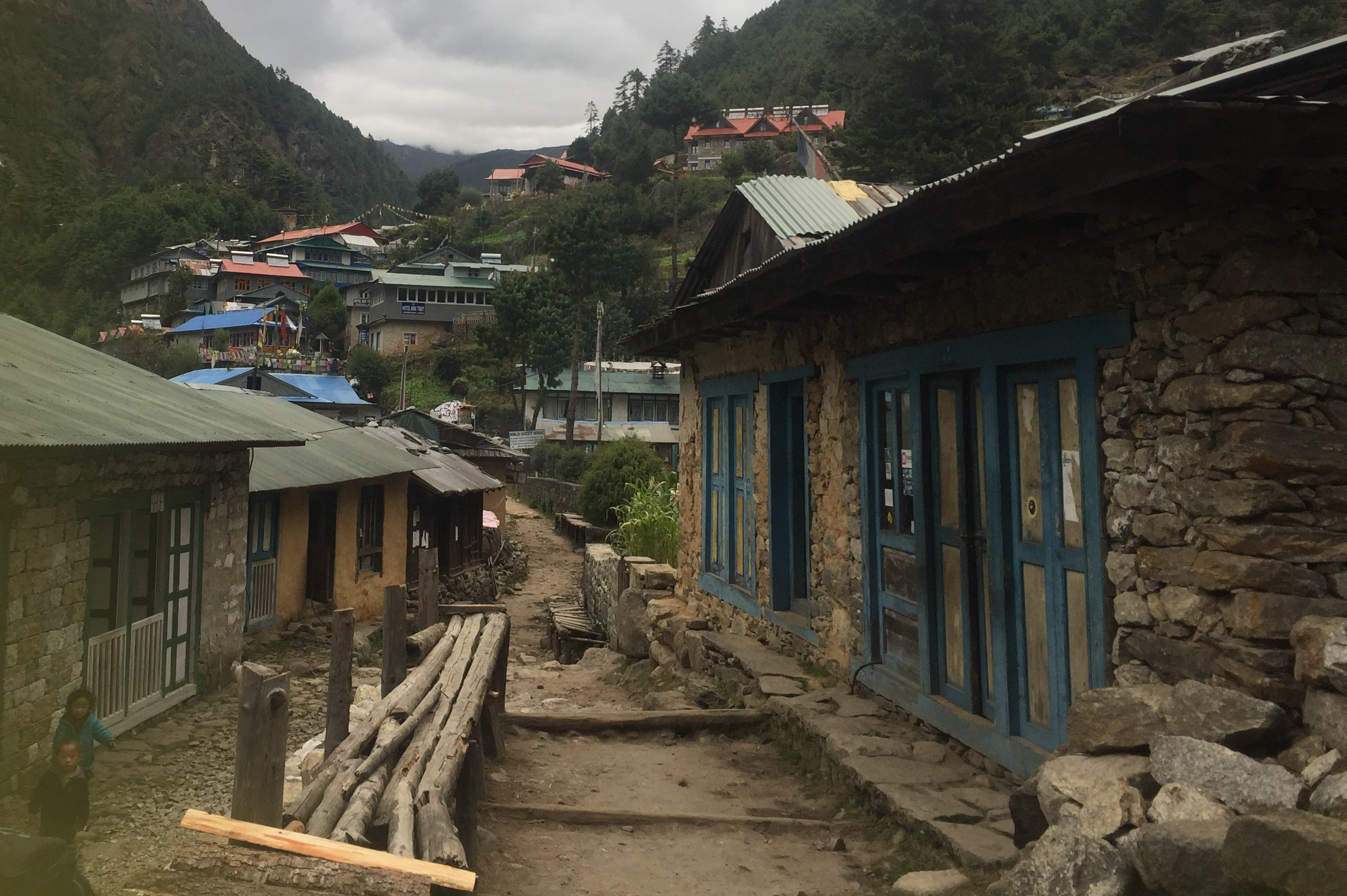
Partial view of Monjo

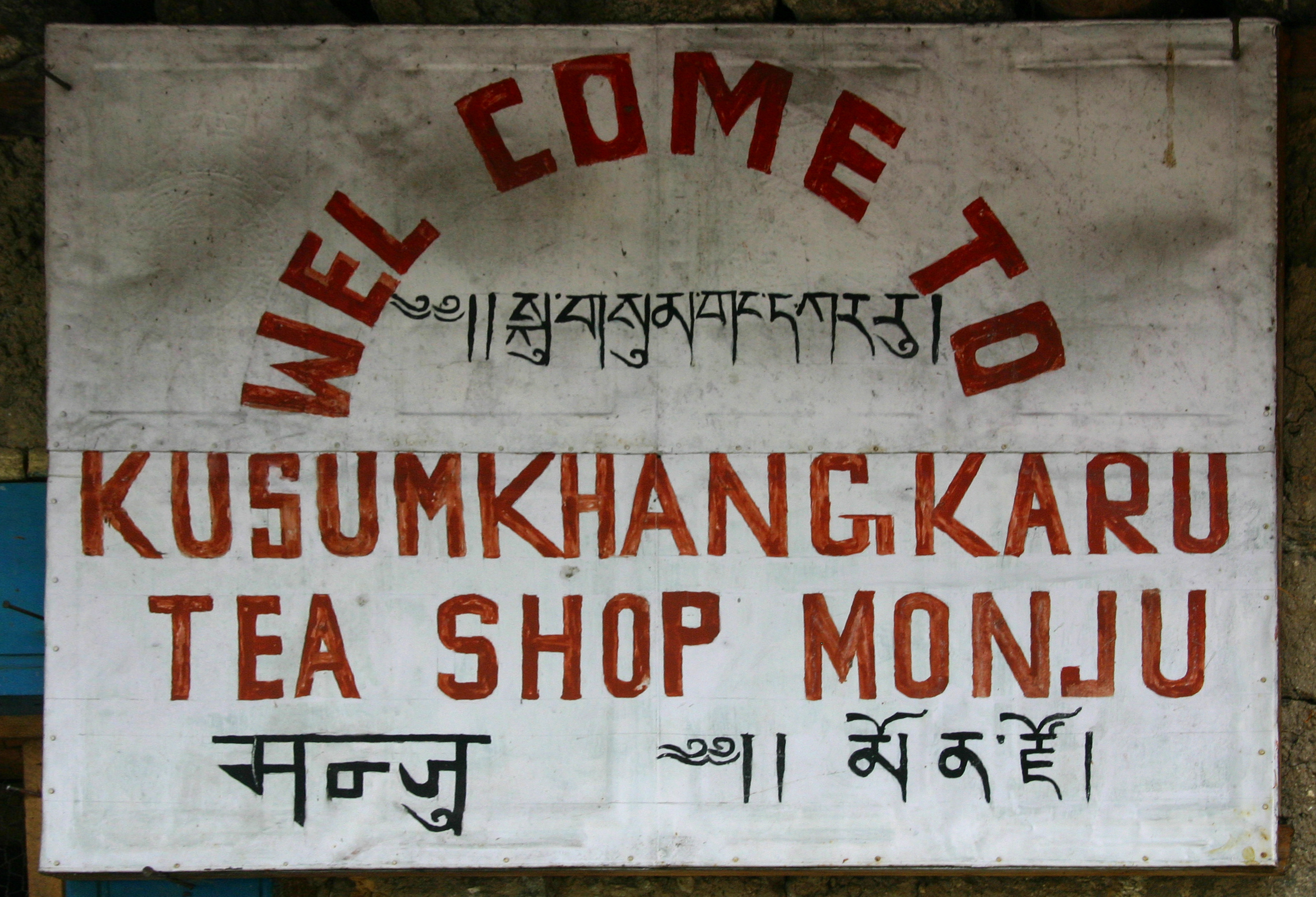
Tea shop of Monjo

Monjo is a small village in the Khumbu region of Nepal. It lies in the Dudh Kosi river valley just north of Phakding and south of Jorsale, at an altitude of 2,835 m, just below the Sagarmatha National Park entrance gate and check-point, one of the UNESCO World Heritage Site since 1979. As per the census of 2011, Monjo village has a population of 114 people. All of them are followers of Buddhism and engaged in the tourism business.

The trail start at Lukla and Monjo is often a stopping point for trekkers, as an alternative of Phakding, on their way to Sagarmartha (Mount Everest) via the Gokyo Ri route or Tengboche route.

Its primary function of the village is to support the tourism industry and as such consists of a number of guesthouses.

== See also ==
- Everest Base Camp
