= Jorsale =

Village in the Khumbu region of Nepal

Coordinates: 27°47′N 86°43′E

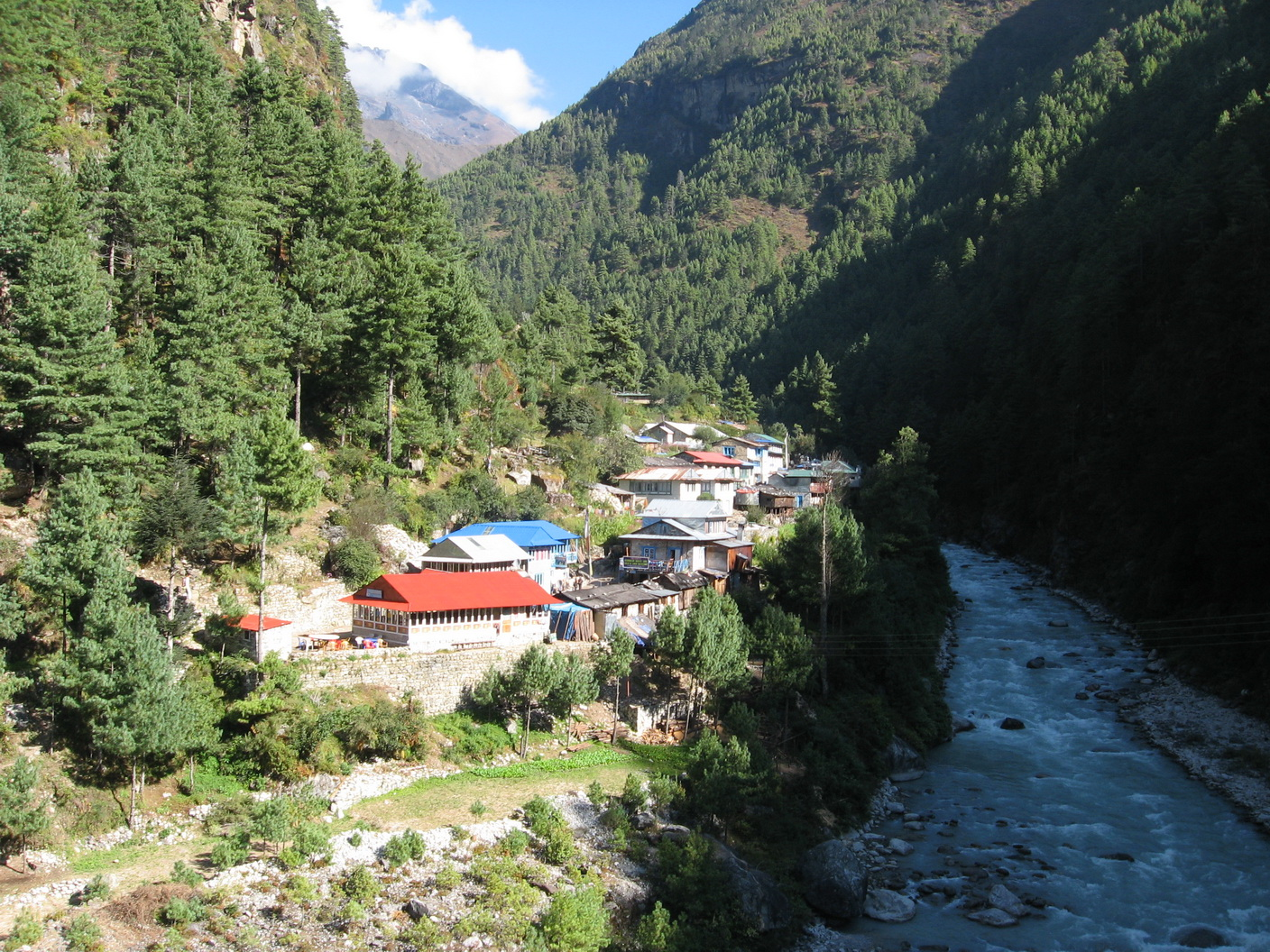
Jorsale village and Duth Kosi river

Jorsale is a small village in the Khumbu region of Nepal. It lies on the west side of the Dudh Kosi river, just north of Monjo and south of Namche Bazaar, at an altitude of 2,740 m.

The trail starts at Lukla, and Jorsale is the last settlement before Namche, the main stopping point for trekkers on their way to Sagarmartha (Mount Everest), one of the UNESCO World Heritage Sites since 1979, via the Gokyo Ri route or Tengboche route.

The primary function of the village is to support the tourism industry and as such consists of a number of guesthouses and a bakery.

== See also ==
- Everest Base Camp
