= Chaurikharka =

Village development committee in Sagarmatha Zone, Nepal

Chaurikharka चौरीखर्क
- Village development committee
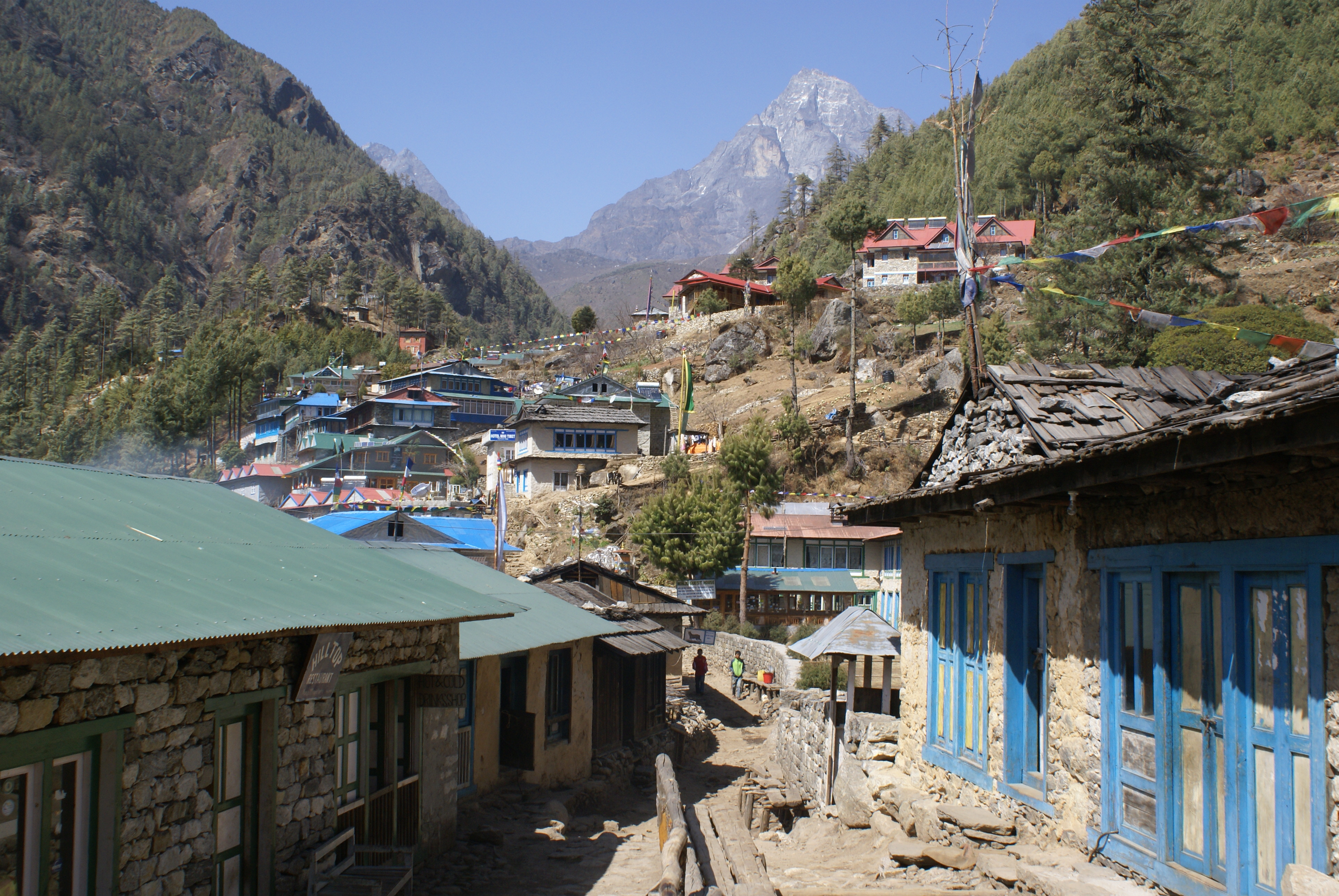

- Location in Nepal
- Coordinates: 27.74°N 86.73°E
- Country: Nepal
- Zone: Sagarmatha Zone
- District: Solukhumbu District

Population (1991)
  - Total: 2,422
- Time zone: UTC+5:45 (Nepal Time)

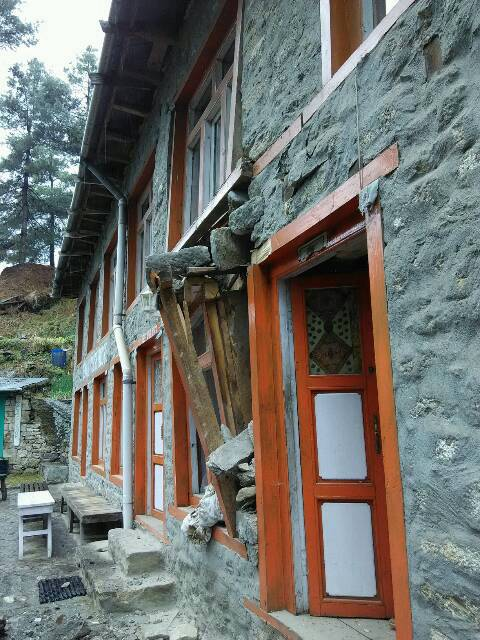
Damage following the April 2015 Nepal earthquake at Benkar, Chaurikharka on the way to Everest Base

Chaurikharka is a village development committee in Solukhumbu District in the Sagarmatha Zone of northeastern Nepal. At the time of the 1991 Nepal census it had a population of 2422 people living in 502 individual households.

== Gallery ==
Chaurikharka - from Lukla to Namche

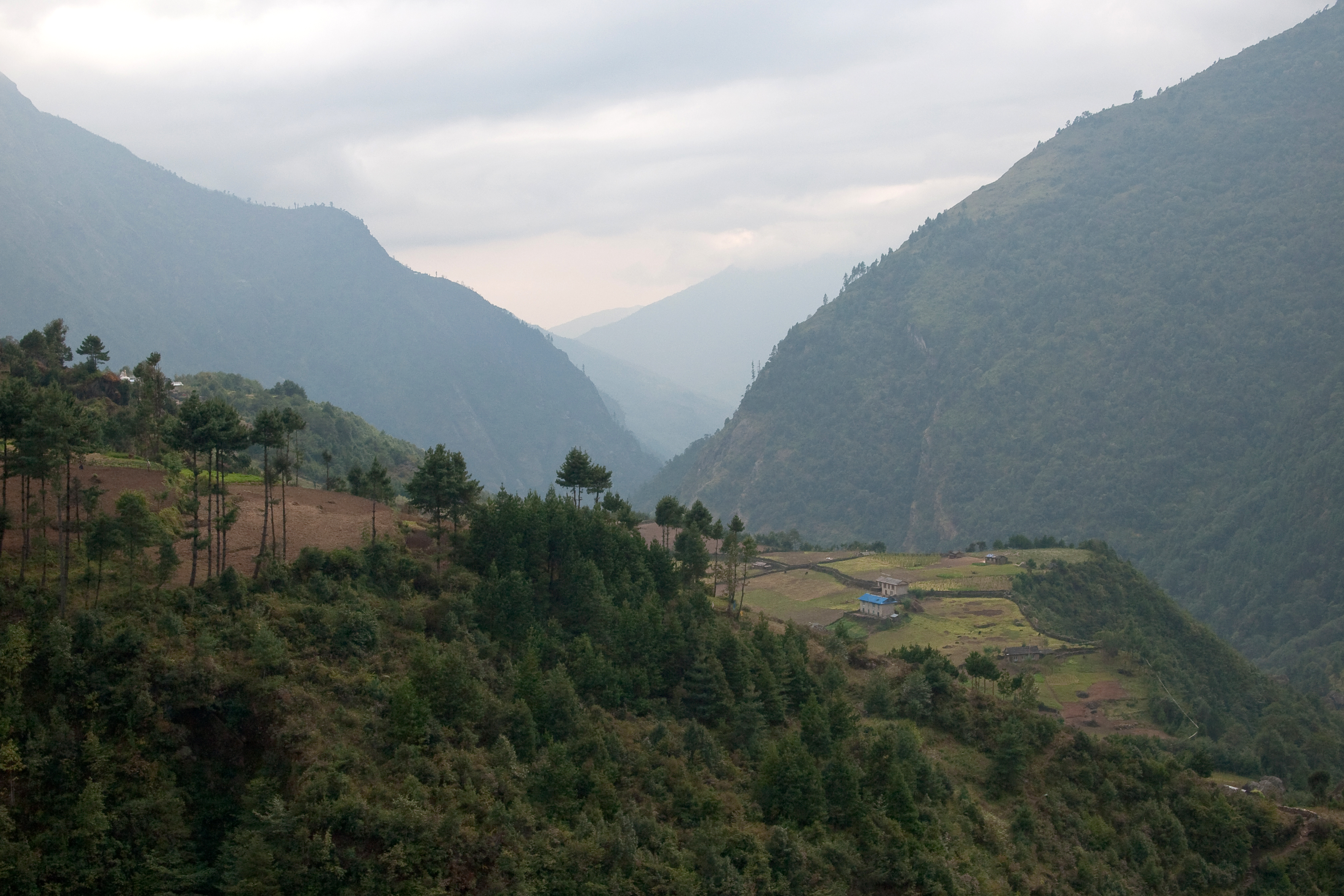
From Lukla to Chheplung

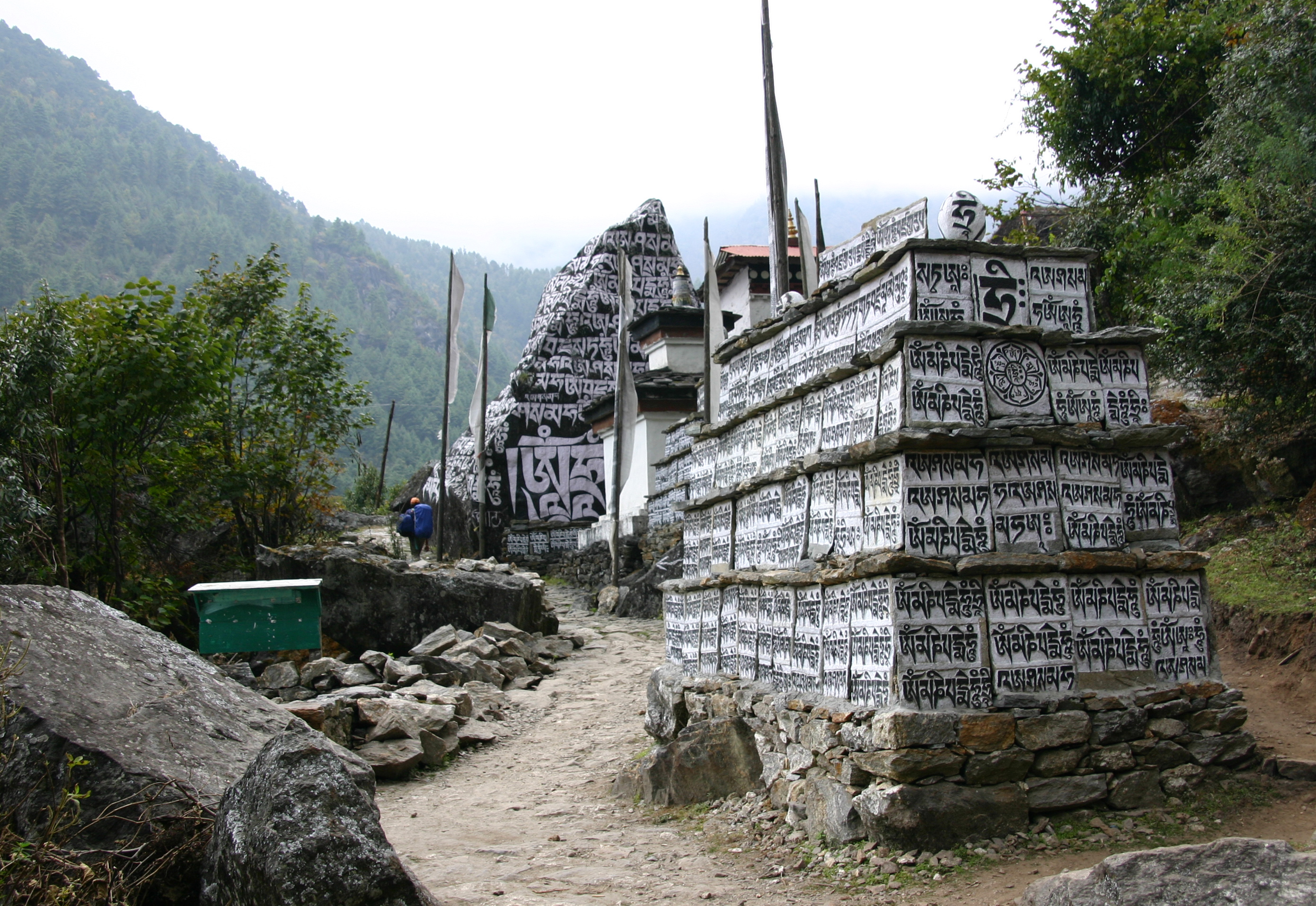
Chhuthawa

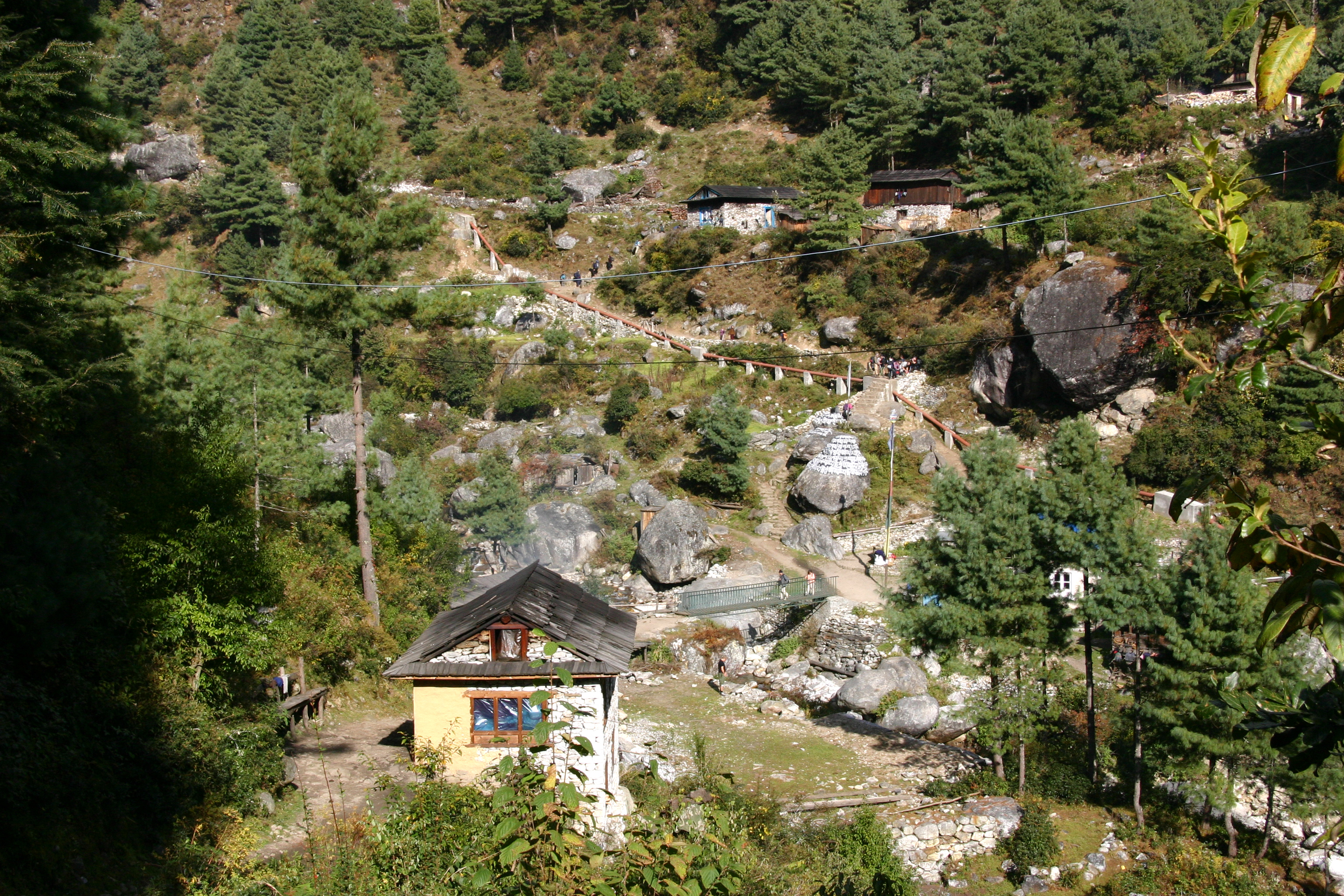
Nyambua Thyang

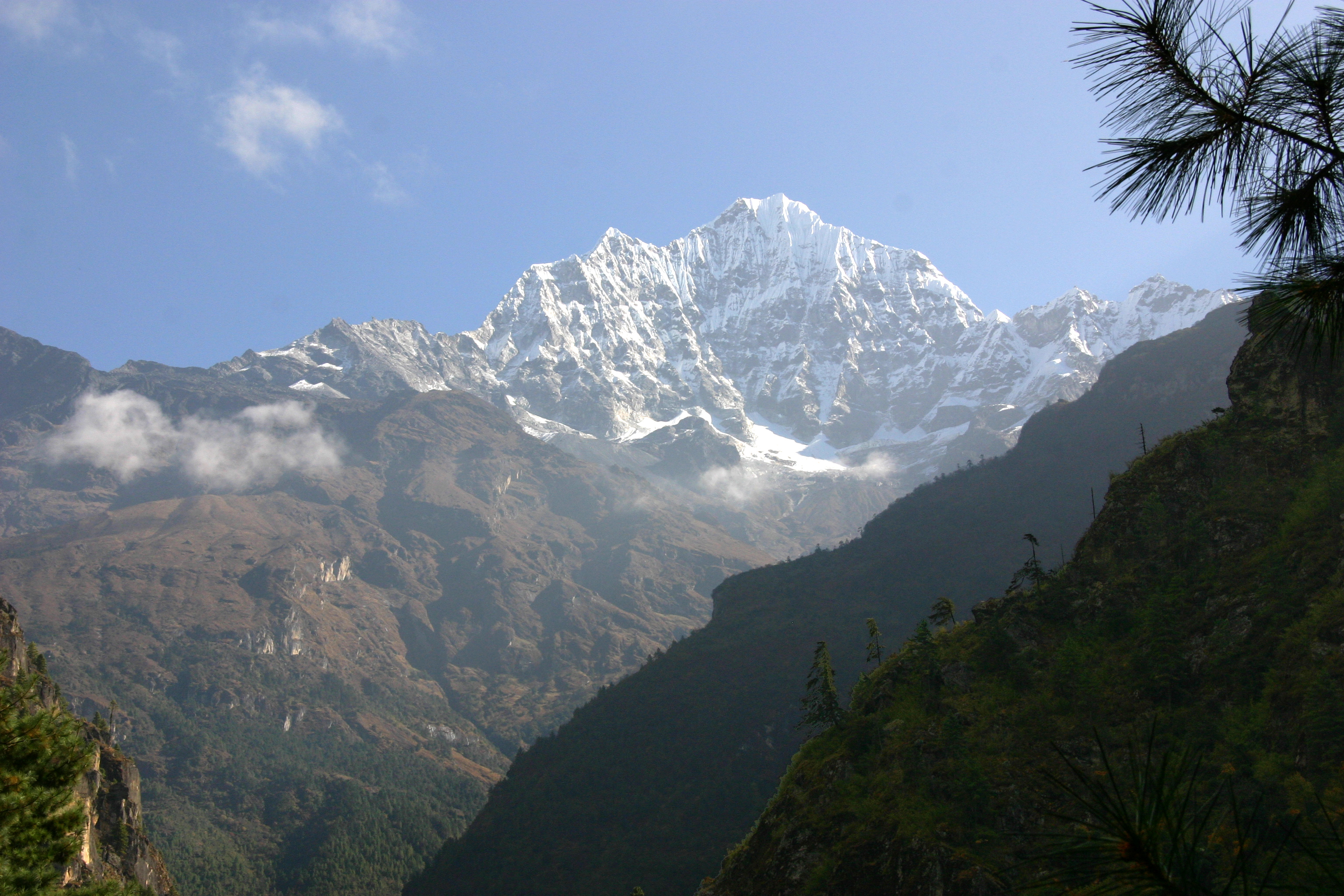
Mountain view

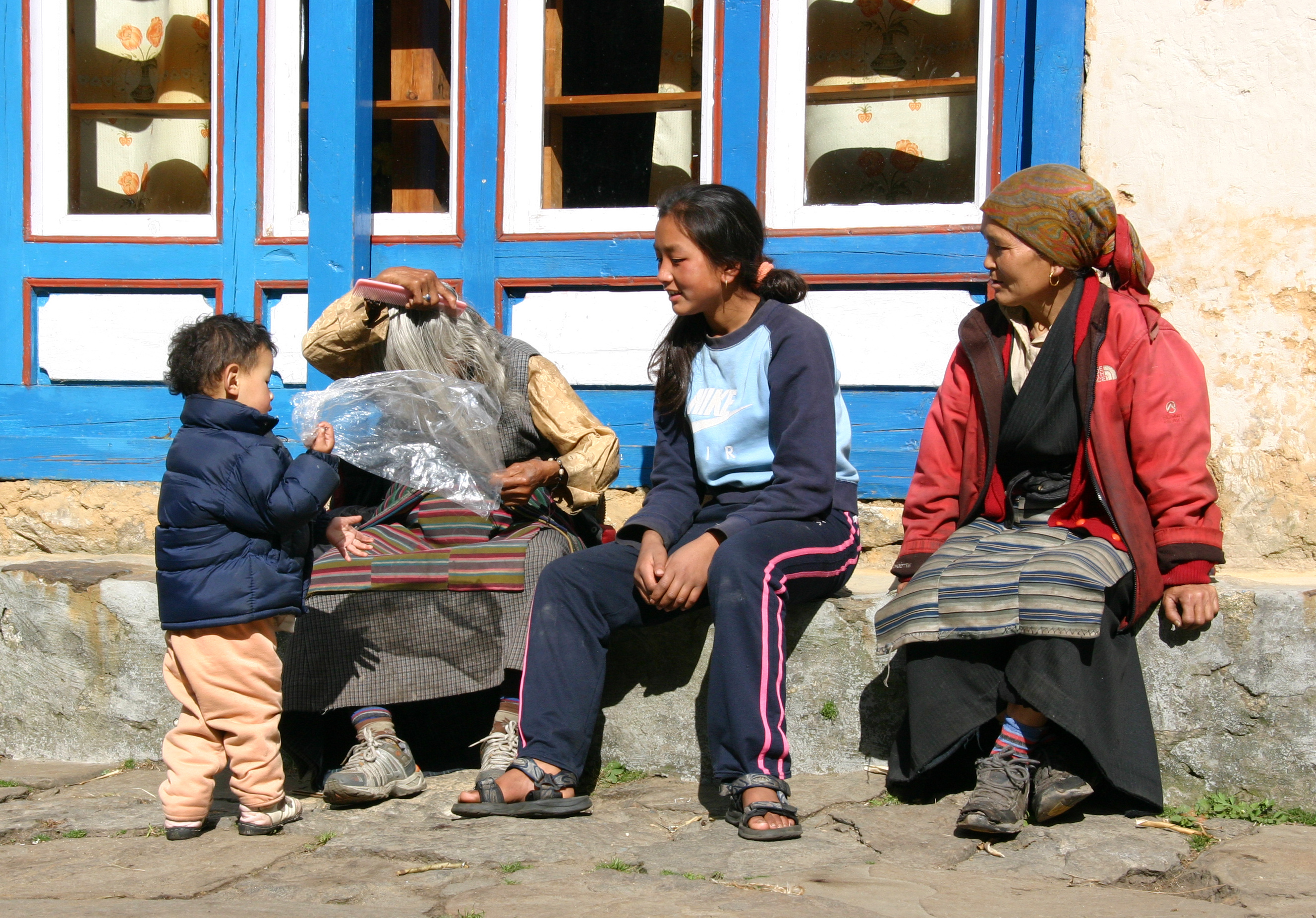
Benkar

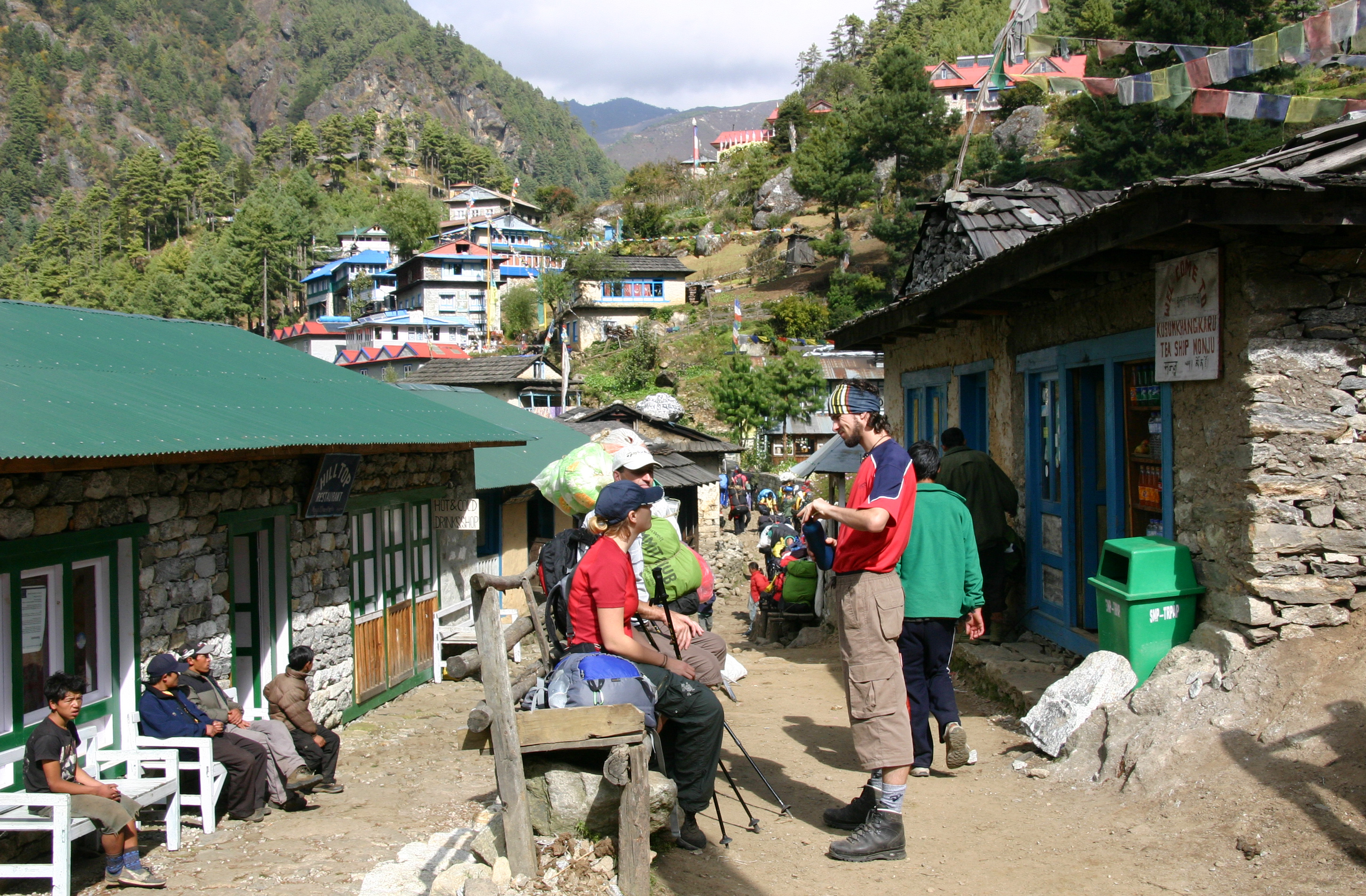
Monju

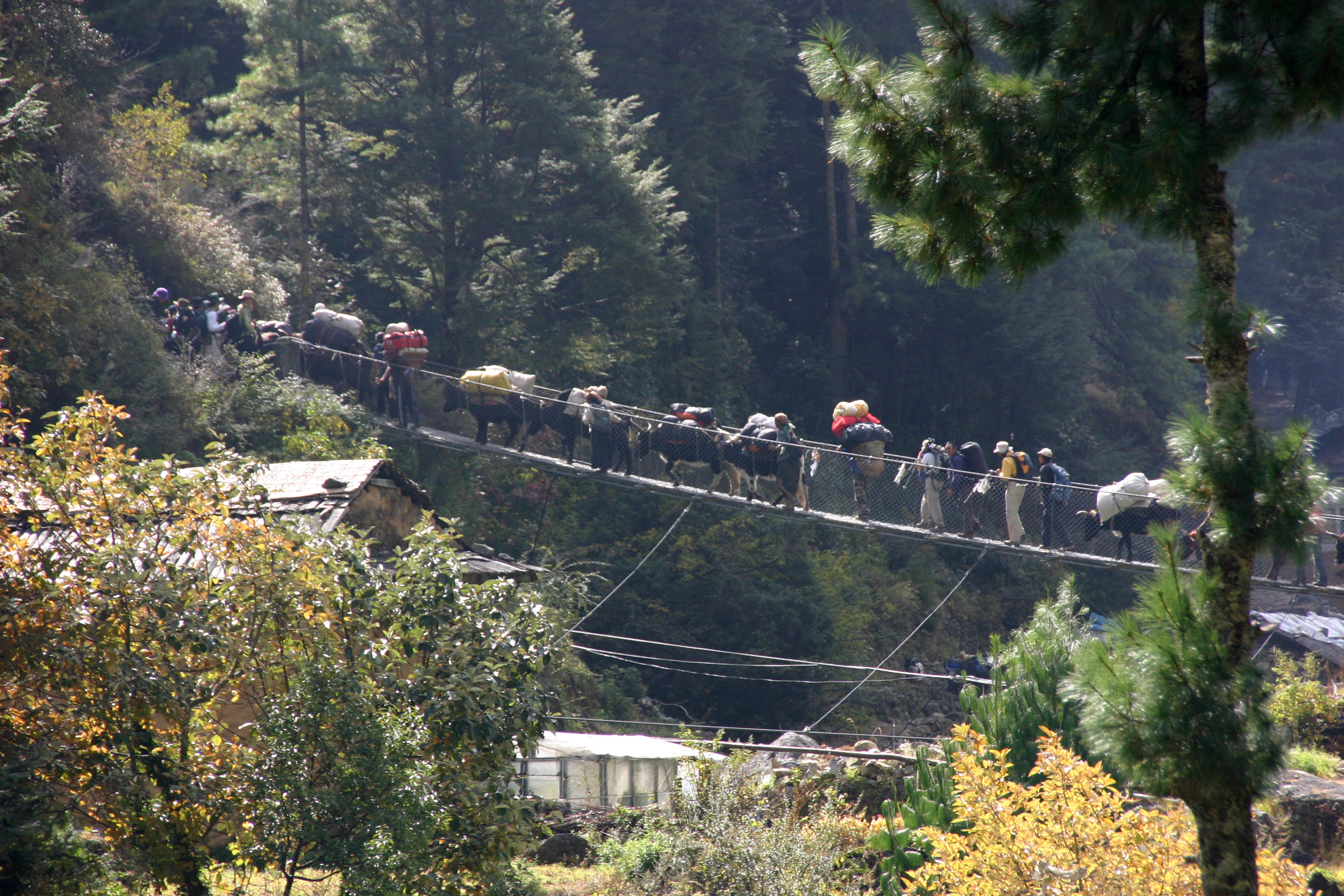
Tawa bridge

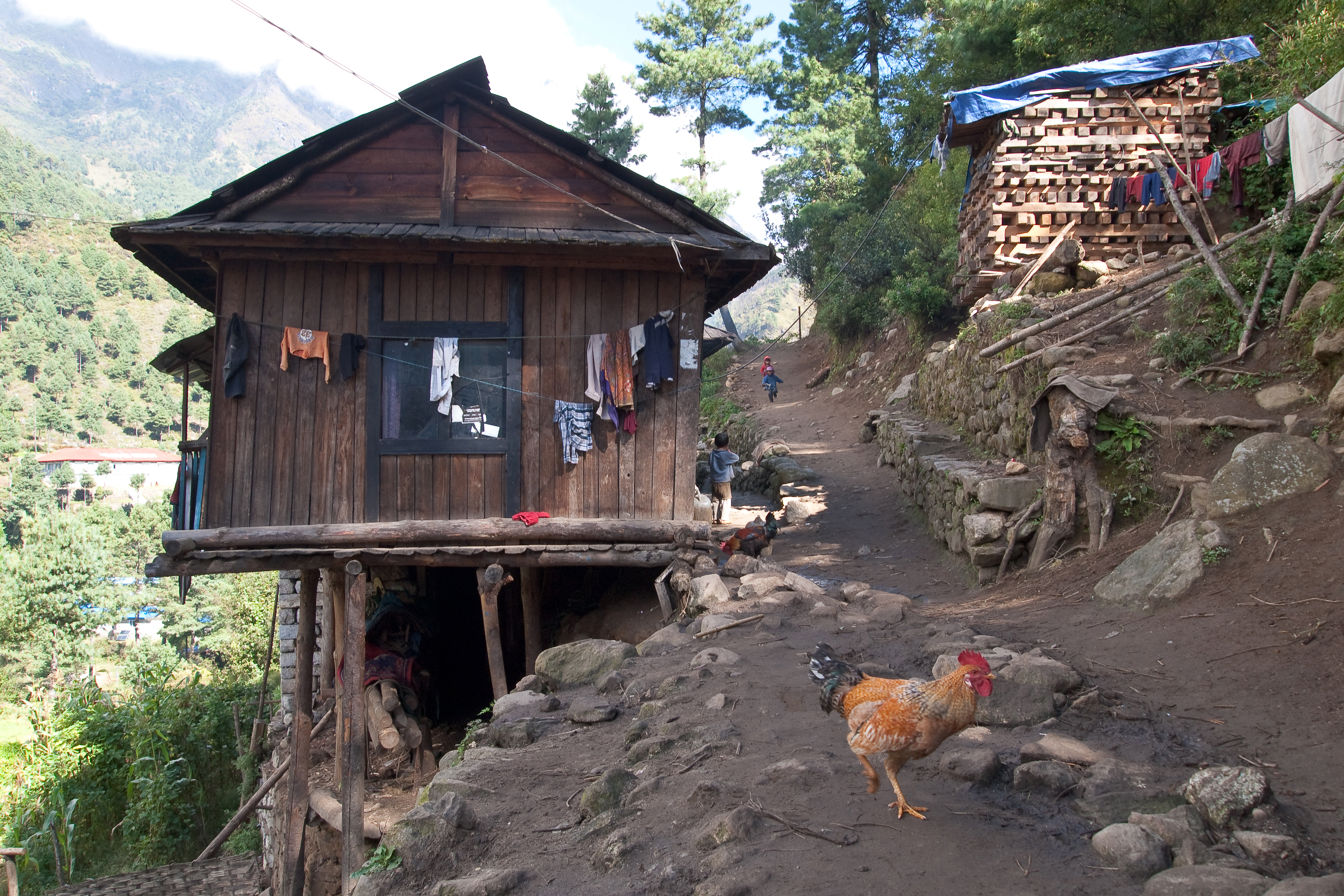
Jorsale

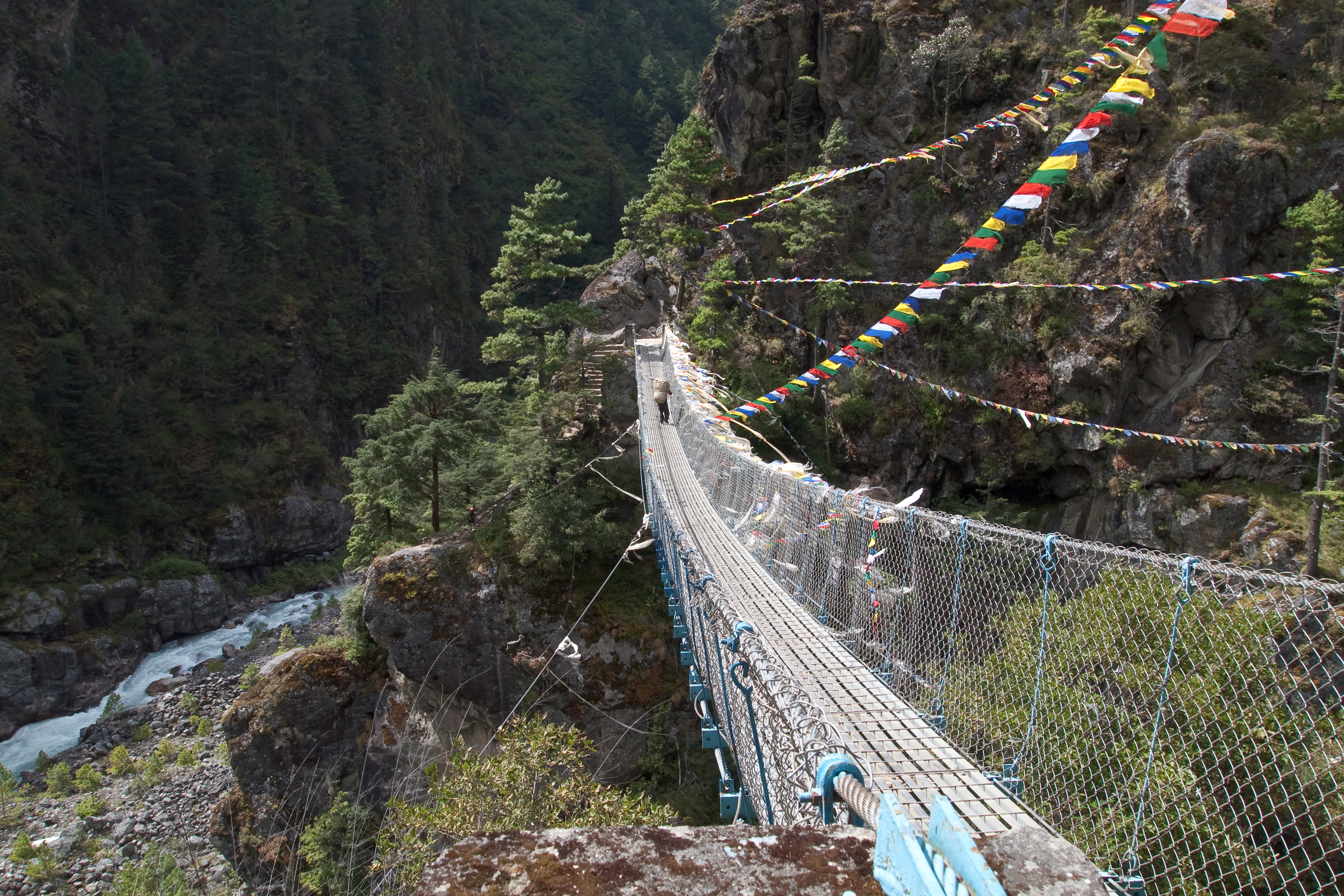
Larja bridge

== Climate ==
Climate data for Chaurikharka, elevation 2,619 m (8,593 ft)
Month	Jan	Feb	Mar	Apr	May	Jun	Jul	Aug	Sep	Oct	Nov	Dec	Year
Mean daily maximum °C (°F)	9.8 (49.6)	11.0 (51.8)	13.6 (56.5)	18.1 (64.6)	19.2 (66.6)	19.5 (67.1)	19.2 (66.6)	19.6 (67.3)	18.3 (64.9)	17.5 (63.5)	14.0 (57.2)	11.3 (52.3)	15.9 (60.7)
Daily mean °C (°F)	4.0 (39.2)	5.4 (41.7)	8.3 (46.9)	12.1 (53.8)	13.6 (56.5)	15.3 (59.5)	15.6 (60.1)	15.6 (60.1)	14.5 (58.1)	12.3 (54.1)	8.1 (46.6)	5.4 (41.7)	10.9 (51.5)
Mean daily minimum °C (°F)	−1.5 (29.3)	−0.3 (31.5)	3.0 (37.4)	6.0 (42.8)	8.3 (46.9)	11.3 (52.3)	12.1 (53.8)	11.6 (52.9)	10.6 (51.1)	7.0 (44.6)	2.2 (36.0)	−0.5 (31.1)	5.8 (42.5)
Average precipitation mm (inches)	18.3 (0.72)	30.3 (1.19)	27.0 (1.06)	60.1 (2.37)	106.7 (4.20)	321.5 (12.66)	583.1 (22.96)	570.1 (22.44)	297.7 (11.72)	63.6 (2.50)	13.0 (0.51)	14.7 (0.58)	2,106.1 (82.91)
Source 1: FAO
Source 2: Agricultural Extension in South Asia (precipitation 1976–2005)
