= Pachyserica =

Scientific classification
- Kingdom: Animalia
- Phylum: Arthropoda
- Class: Insecta
- Order: Coleoptera
- Suborder: Polyphaga
- Infraorder: Scarabaeiformia
- Family: Scarabaeidae
- Subfamily: Sericinae
- Tribe: Sericini
- Genus: Pachyserica; Brenske, 1898

Genus of leaf beetles

Pachyserica is a genus of beetles belonging to the family Scarabaeidae.

== Species ==
- Pachyserica albopunctata Zhao & Ahrens, 2023
- Pachyserica albosignata (Moser, 1915)
- Pachyserica albosquamosa Brenske, 1898
- Pachyserica ambiversa Ahrens, 2004
- Pachyserica balkei Ahrens, 2006
- Pachyserica bistriata Ahrens, 2006
- Pachyserica bituberculata Ahrens, 2006
- Pachyserica chenchangchini Ahrens, Zhao, Pham & Liu, 2024
- Pachyserica cipingensis Ahrens, 2006
- Pachyserica collaris Ahrens, 2006
- Pachyserica conspersa Ahrens, 2006
- Pachyserica darjeelingensis Ahrens, 2004
- Pachyserica desenderi Ahrens, 2006
- Pachyserica dieuthuyae Ahrens, Zhao, Pham & Liu, 2024
- Pachyserica dongnanensis Zhao & Ahrens, 2023
- Pachyserica garoensis Ahrens, 2006
- Pachyserica gracilis Ahrens, 2004
- Pachyserica himalayensis Ahrens, 2004
- Pachyserica hoabinhensis Ahrens, Zhao, Pham & Liu, 2024
- Pachyserica horishana (Niijima & Kinoshita, 1927)
- Pachyserica huanglianensis Ahrens, 2006
- Pachyserica interruptolineata Ahrens, 2006
- Pachyserica janbezdeki Ahrens, 2006
- Pachyserica jendeki Ahrens, 2004
- Pachyserica jianfengensis Zhao & Ahrens, 2023
- Pachyserica marmorata (Blanchard, 1850)
- Pachyserica minax Ahrens & Fabrizi, 2009
- Pachyserica motuo Ahrens, Zhao, Pham & Liu, 2024
- Pachyserica nantouensis Kobayashi & Yu, 1993
- Pachyserica natmatoung Ahrens, Zhao, Pham & Liu, 2024
- Pachyserica nepalica Ahrens, 2004
- Pachyserica numensis Ahrens, 2004
- Pachyserica olafi Ahrens, 2004
- Pachyserica pellingensis Ahrens, 2004
- Pachyserica putaoensis Ahrens, 2006
- Pachyserica rubrobasalis Brenske, 1897
- Pachyserica sanqingshanensis Ahrens, Zhao, Pham & Liu, 2024
- Pachyserica sapae Ahrens, 2006
- Pachyserica scalaris Arrow, 1946
- Pachyserica squamifera (Frey, 1972)
- Pachyserica stabilis Ahrens, 2004
- Pachyserica striatipennis Moser, 1908
- Pachyserica sunfengyii Ahrens, Zhao, Pham & Liu, 2024
- Pachyserica tayyentu Ahrens, Zhao, Pham & Liu, 2024
- Pachyserica tianxuani Ahrens, Zhao, Pham & Liu, 2024
- Pachyserica vorax Ahrens, 2006
- Pachyserica wangzizhaoi Ahrens, Zhao, Pham & Liu, 2024
- Pachyserica yanoi Nomura, 1959
- Pachyserica yaonani Ahrens, Zhao, Pham & Liu, 2024
- Pachyserica yinhengi Ahrens, Zhao, Pham & Liu, 2024
- Pachyserica zhanbaoxiangi Ahrens, Zhao, Pham & Liu, 2024

== Selected former species ==
- Pachyserica brevitarsis Kobayashi & Yu, 1993
