= Pachyserica natmatoung =

Scientific classification
- Kingdom: Animalia
- Phylum: Arthropoda
- Class: Insecta
- Order: Coleoptera
- Suborder: Polyphaga
- Infraorder: Scarabaeiformia
- Family: Scarabaeidae
- Genus: Pachyserica
- Species: P. natmatoung

Binomial name
- Pachyserica natmatoung Ahrens, Zhao, Pham & Liu, 2024

Species of beetle

Pachyserica natmatoung is a species of beetle of the family Scarabaeidae. It is found in Myanmar.

== Description ==
Adults reach a length of about 8.6–9.6 mm. They have a dark brown, oblong-oval and convex body. The punctures of the elytra, elytral stripes and legs are reddish brown. The elytra with dark spots. The antennae are yellow. The dorsal surface is dull, partly with a weak iridescent shine and with fine, dense, short, white setae. There are long, fine, erect, yellow setae on the head and a few on the pronotum.

== Etymology ==
The species is named after its type locality, Nat Ma Toung.
