= Pachyserica tayyentu =

Scientific classification
- Kingdom: Animalia
- Phylum: Arthropoda
- Class: Insecta
- Order: Coleoptera
- Suborder: Polyphaga
- Infraorder: Scarabaeiformia
- Family: Scarabaeidae
- Genus: Pachyserica
- Species: P. tayyentu

Binomial name
- Pachyserica tayyentu Ahrens, Zhao, Pham & Liu, 2024

Species of beetle

Pachyserica tayyentu is a species of beetle of the family Scarabaeidae. It is found in Vietnam.

== Description ==
Adults reach a length of about 7.5–7.7 mm. They have a dark brown, oval and strongly convex body. The dorsal surface has a greenish shine and the elytra have darker spots. The antennae are yellow. The ventral surface and legs are brown. The dorsal surface has an iridescent shine, with fine, partly patchily distributed or dense, short, white or yellowish setae.

== Etymology ==
The species is named after its type locality, the Tay Yen Tu Nature Reserve.
