= Pachyserica dongnanensis =

Scientific classification
- Kingdom: Animalia
- Phylum: Arthropoda
- Class: Insecta
- Order: Coleoptera
- Suborder: Polyphaga
- Infraorder: Scarabaeiformia
- Family: Scarabaeidae
- Genus: Pachyserica
- Species: P. dongnanensis

Binomial name
- Pachyserica dongnanensis Zhao & Ahrens, 2023

Species of beetle

Pachyserica dongnanensis is a species of beetle of the family Scarabaeidae. It is found in China (Fujian, Guangdong, Guangxi, Hunan, Zhejiang).

== Description ==
Adults reach a length of about 8–9.7 mm. They have a dark brown, elongated ovoid body, with greenish toment. The sutural interval of the elytra is reddish brown, the abdomen is iridescent, the legs are reddish brown and the antennae are yellowish brown.

== Etymology ==
The species name is derived from Dong’nan, which refers to a geographic zone that includes the Chinese provinces of Guangxi, Guangdong, Fujian and Zhejiang.
