= Pachyserica yaonani =

Scientific classification
- Kingdom: Animalia
- Phylum: Arthropoda
- Class: Insecta
- Order: Coleoptera
- Suborder: Polyphaga
- Infraorder: Scarabaeiformia
- Family: Scarabaeidae
- Genus: Pachyserica
- Species: P. yaonani

Binomial name
- Pachyserica yaonani Ahrens, Zhao, Pham & Liu, 2024

Species of beetle

Pachyserica yaonani is a species of beetle of the family Scarabaeidae. It is found in China (Xizang).

== Description ==
Adults reach a length of about 10.1–10.5 mm. They have a dark brown, oval and strongly convex body. The dorsal surface has a strong greenish or partly weak iridescent shine. The elytra are slightly lighter, with dark spots. The antennae are yellow. The dorsal surface has fine, partly patchily distributed, or dense, short, lanceolate or oblong setae. There are fine, erect, long, yellow setae on the head, pronotum and anterior elytra. The ventral surface is strongly iridescent.

== Etymology ==
The species is named after its collector, Mr. Yao-Nan Zhang.
