= Pachyserica nepalica =

Scientific classification
- Kingdom: Animalia
- Phylum: Arthropoda
- Class: Insecta
- Order: Coleoptera
- Suborder: Polyphaga
- Infraorder: Scarabaeiformia
- Family: Scarabaeidae
- Genus: Pachyserica
- Species: P. nepalica

Binomial name
- Pachyserica nepalica Ahrens, 2004

Species of beetle

Pachyserica nepalica is a species of beetle of the family Scarabaeidae. It is found in Nepal.
