= Pachyserica sunfengyii =

Scientific classification
- Kingdom: Animalia
- Phylum: Arthropoda
- Class: Insecta
- Order: Coleoptera
- Suborder: Polyphaga
- Infraorder: Scarabaeiformia
- Family: Scarabaeidae
- Genus: Pachyserica
- Species: P. sunfengyii

Binomial name
- Pachyserica sunfengyii Ahrens, Zhao, Pham & Liu, 2024

Species of beetle

Pachyserica sunfengyii is a species of beetle of the family Scarabaeidae. It is found in China (Guangxi).

== Description ==
Adults reach a length of about 11 mm. They have a dark brown, oval and strongly convex body. The dorsal surface has a strongly greenish, iridescent shine. The elytra are without dark spots and the antennae are yellow. The dorsal and ventral surface have fine, partly patchily distributed, or dense, short, yellow, scale-like setae. There are a few long, fine, erect, yellow setae on the head, pronotum and anterior elytra.

== Etymology ==
The species is named after its collector, Mr. Feng-Yi Sun.
