= Pachyserica nantouensis =

Scientific classification
- Kingdom: Animalia
- Phylum: Arthropoda
- Class: Insecta
- Order: Coleoptera
- Suborder: Polyphaga
- Infraorder: Scarabaeiformia
- Family: Scarabaeidae
- Genus: Pachyserica
- Species: P. nantouensis

Binomial name
- Pachyserica nantouensis Kobayashi & Yu, 1993

Synonyms
- Pachyserica similis Kobayashi & Yu, 1993

Species of beetle

Pachyserica nantouensis is a species of beetle of the family Scarabaeidae. It is found in Taiwan.

== Description ==
Adults reach a length of about 8.2–9 mm. They have a dark green to brown, elongate-oval body. The legs, pronotal and elytral margins are reddish-brown and the antennae are yellowish-brown. The surface is almost entirely dull. The upper surface has numerous white scale-like hairs and the elytra are without erect setae.
