= Pachyserica tianxuani =

Scientific classification
- Kingdom: Animalia
- Phylum: Arthropoda
- Class: Insecta
- Order: Coleoptera
- Suborder: Polyphaga
- Infraorder: Scarabaeiformia
- Family: Scarabaeidae
- Genus: Pachyserica
- Species: P. tianxuani

Binomial name
- Pachyserica tianxuani Ahrens, Zhao, Pham & Liu, 2024

Species of beetle

Pachyserica tianxuani is a species of beetle of the family Scarabaeidae. It is found in China (Chongqing).

== Description ==
Adults reach a length of about 9.7 mm. They have an oblong-oval and convex body. The body (including antennae and legs) is reddish brown, the elytra with dark, green spots. The dorsal surface is dull, partly with a weak iridescent shine, while the frons and pronotum have dark green toment and long, erect, yellow setae. The entire body has dense, white, scale-like setae, the elytra also with some longer and erect setae.

== Etymology ==
The species is named after the collector of the holotype, Mr. Tian-Xuan Gu.
