= Pachyserica bituberculata =

Scientific classification
- Kingdom: Animalia
- Phylum: Arthropoda
- Class: Insecta
- Order: Coleoptera
- Suborder: Polyphaga
- Infraorder: Scarabaeiformia
- Family: Scarabaeidae
- Genus: Pachyserica
- Species: P. bituberculata

Binomial name
- Pachyserica bituberculata Ahrens, 2006

Species of beetle

Pachyserica bituberculata is a species of beetle of the family Scarabaeidae. It is found in India (Meghalaya), Myanmar and China (Xizang).

== Description ==
Adults reach a length of about 6.9–7.8 mm. They have a dark reddish-brown, elongate-oval body, with dark spots or a greenish tinge. The antennae are yellowish-brown. The surface is entirely dull, except for the shiny labroclypeus. The upper surface has numerous fine, white scale-like hairs arranged in patches and dense, erect, moderately long, thin setae.

== Etymology ==
The species name is derived from Latin bituberculata (meaning with two humps).
