= Pachyserica zhanbaoxiangi =

Scientific classification
- Kingdom: Animalia
- Phylum: Arthropoda
- Class: Insecta
- Order: Coleoptera
- Suborder: Polyphaga
- Infraorder: Scarabaeiformia
- Family: Scarabaeidae
- Genus: Pachyserica
- Species: P. zhanbaoxiangi

Binomial name
- Pachyserica zhanbaoxiangi Ahrens, Zhao, Pham & Liu, 2024

Species of beetle

Pachyserica zhanbaoxiangi is a species of beetle of the family Scarabaeidae. It is found in China (Guangdong).

== Description ==
Adults reach a length of about 9.2 mm. They have an oblong and convex body. The body (including legs) is reddish brown. The antennae are yellowish brown, the pronotum and ventral surface darker and the frons and elytral intervals dark green. The dorsal surface is dull, the head and pronotum with yellow, long, erect setae, as well as lanceolate or oblong, white setae, The elytra additionally have a few longer, lanceolate or fine semierect setae.

== Etymology ==
The species is named after one of the collectors, Mr. Bao-Xiang Zhan.
