= Pachyserica rubrobasalis =

Scientific classification
- Kingdom: Animalia
- Phylum: Arthropoda
- Class: Insecta
- Order: Coleoptera
- Suborder: Polyphaga
- Infraorder: Scarabaeiformia
- Family: Scarabaeidae
- Genus: Pachyserica
- Species: P. rubrobasalis

Binomial name
- Pachyserica rubrobasalis Brenske, 1897

Species of beetle

Pachyserica rubrobasalis is a species of beetle of the family Scarabaeidae. It is found in China (Fujian, Guangdong, Guangxi, Hunan, Jiangxi, Zhejiang).

== Description ==
Adults reach a length of about 11.3 mm. They have a dark brown, elongate-oval body, with a greenish sheen. The antennae are yellowish-brown, the surface entirely matte tomentose except for the shiny labroclypeus. The dorsum has numerous white scale-like hairs, while the pronotum and elytra are without erect setae.
