= Pachyserica jianfengensis =

Scientific classification
- Kingdom: Animalia
- Phylum: Arthropoda
- Class: Insecta
- Order: Coleoptera
- Suborder: Polyphaga
- Infraorder: Scarabaeiformia
- Family: Scarabaeidae
- Genus: Pachyserica
- Species: P. jianfengensis

Binomial name
- Pachyserica jianfengensis Zhao & Ahrens, 2023

Species of beetle

Pachyserica jianfengensis is a species of beetle of the family Scarabaeidae. It is found in China (Hainan).

== Description ==
Adults reach a length of about 8.1 mm. They have a dark reddish brown, ovoid body. The frons, pronotum, scutellum and impunctate portions on the elytra with a rather strong greenish sheen, while the abdomen is strongly iridescent. The legs are reddish brown and the antennae are yellowish brown.

== Etymology ==
The species name is derived from its type locality, Jianfengling.
