= Pachyserica numensis =

Scientific classification
- Kingdom: Animalia
- Phylum: Arthropoda
- Class: Insecta
- Order: Coleoptera
- Suborder: Polyphaga
- Infraorder: Scarabaeiformia
- Family: Scarabaeidae
- Genus: Pachyserica
- Species: P. numensis

Binomial name
- Pachyserica numensis Ahrens, 2004

Species of beetle

Pachyserica numensis is a species of beetle of the family Scarabaeidae. It is found in the Himalaya in eastern Nepal.

== Description ==
Adults reach a length of about 8.4 mm. They have a dark brown, elongate-oval body, but reddish-brown in some areas or with a greenish sheen. The antennae are yellowish-brown and the dorsal surface is dull with white hairs and erect, long, thin setae.

== Etymology ==
The species is named for the village of Num near the type location.
