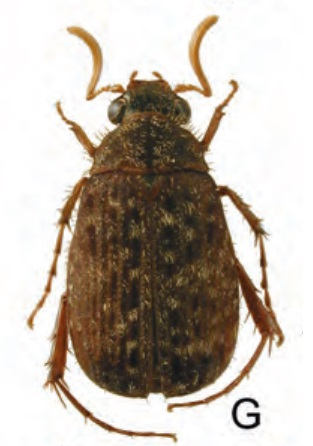

Scientific classification
- Kingdom: Animalia
- Phylum: Arthropoda
- Class: Insecta
- Order: Coleoptera
- Suborder: Polyphaga
- Infraorder: Scarabaeiformia
- Family: Scarabaeidae
- Genus: Pachyserica
- Species: P. pellingensis

Binomial name
- Pachyserica pellingensis Ahrens, 2004

= Pachyserica pellingensis =

Species of beetle

Pachyserica pellingensis is a species of beetle of the family Scarabaeidae. It is found in eastern Nepal and India (Sikkim).

== Description ==
Adults reach a length of about 6.7-7.1 mm. They have a dark brown, elongate body, with some reddish-brown areas. The antennae are yellowish-brown and the dorsal surface is dull with white hairs and erect, long, thin setae.

== Etymology ==
The species is named for the type locality, Pelling.
