= Pachyserica stabilis =

Scientific classification
- Kingdom: Animalia
- Phylum: Arthropoda
- Class: Insecta
- Order: Coleoptera
- Suborder: Polyphaga
- Infraorder: Scarabaeiformia
- Family: Scarabaeidae
- Genus: Pachyserica
- Species: P. stabilis

Binomial name
- Pachyserica stabilis Ahrens, 2004

Species of beetle

Pachyserica stabilis is a species of beetle of the family Scarabaeidae. It is found in India (Darjeeling).

== Description ==
Adults reach a length of about 7.7–9 mm. They have a reddish-brown brown, elongate-oval body, with some dark spots. The antennae are yellowish-brown and the dorsal surface is dull with white hairs and erect, long, thin setae.

== Etymology ==
The species name is derived from Latin stabilis (meaning firm).
