= Pachyserica striatipennis =

Scientific classification
- Kingdom: Animalia
- Phylum: Arthropoda
- Clade: Pancrustacea
- Class: Insecta
- Order: Coleoptera
- Suborder: Polyphaga
- Infraorder: Scarabaeiformia
- Family: Scarabaeidae
- Genus: Pachyserica
- Species: P. striatipennis

Binomial name
- Pachyserica striatipennis Moser, 1908

Species of beetle

Pachyserica striatipennis is a species of beetle of the family Scarabaeidae. It is found in Vietnam and China (Guangxi, Yunnan).

== Description ==
Adults reach a length of about 10.6 mm. They have a dark brown, oblong-ovate body, with a greenish sheen. The antennae are yellowish-brown. The surface is entirely dull tomentose, except for the shiny labroclypeus. The upper surface has numerous white scale-like hairs and the pronotum and elytra have some erect, long, thin setae.
