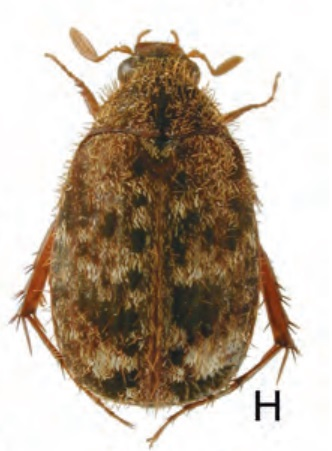

Scientific classification
- Kingdom: Animalia
- Phylum: Arthropoda
- Class: Insecta
- Order: Coleoptera
- Suborder: Polyphaga
- Infraorder: Scarabaeiformia
- Family: Scarabaeidae
- Genus: Pachyserica
- Species: P. olafi

Binomial name
- Pachyserica olafi Ahrens, 2004

= Pachyserica olafi =

Species of beetle

Pachyserica olafi is a species of beetle of the family Scarabaeidae. It has been recorded from the central and eastern Nepal Himalaya.

== Description ==
Adults reach a length of about 6.1-8.4 mm. They have a dark brown, elongate-oval body, but reddish-brown in some areas or with a greenish sheen. The antennae are yellowish-brown and the dorsal surface is dull with white hairs and erect, long, thin setae.

== Etymology ==
The species is named for Olaf Jäger, a friend of the author.
