= Pachyserica ambiversa =

Scientific classification
- Kingdom: Animalia
- Phylum: Arthropoda
- Class: Insecta
- Order: Coleoptera
- Suborder: Polyphaga
- Infraorder: Scarabaeiformia
- Family: Scarabaeidae
- Genus: Pachyserica
- Species: P. ambiversa

Binomial name
- Pachyserica ambiversa Ahrens, 2004

Species of beetle

Pachyserica ambiversa is a species of beetle of the family Scarabaeidae. It is found in central Nepal.

== Description ==
Adults reach a length of about 8.1–9 mm. They have a dark brown, elongate-oval body, but reddish-brown in some areas or with a greenish sheen. The antennae are yellowish-brown and the dorsal surface is dull with white hairs and erect, long, thin setae.

== Etymology ==
The species name is derived from the Latin words ambo (meaning both) and versus (meaning rotated).
