= Pachyserica yanoi =

Scientific classification
- Kingdom: Animalia
- Phylum: Arthropoda
- Class: Insecta
- Order: Coleoptera
- Suborder: Polyphaga
- Infraorder: Scarabaeiformia
- Family: Scarabaeidae
- Genus: Pachyserica
- Species: P. yanoi

Binomial name
- Pachyserica yanoi Nomura, 1959

Species of beetle

Pachyserica yanoi is a species of beetle of the family Scarabaeidae. It is found in Japan (Ryukyu islands) and Taiwan.
