= Pachyserica janbezdeki =

Scientific classification
- Kingdom: Animalia
- Phylum: Arthropoda
- Class: Insecta
- Order: Coleoptera
- Suborder: Polyphaga
- Infraorder: Scarabaeiformia
- Family: Scarabaeidae
- Genus: Pachyserica
- Species: P. janbezdeki

Binomial name
- Pachyserica janbezdeki Ahrens, 2006

Species of beetle

Pachyserica janbezdeki is a species of beetle of the family Scarabaeidae. It is found in Laos.

== Description ==
Adults reach a length of about 9-9.8 mm. They have a reddish-brown, elongate-oval body, with dark spots and a partially greenish sheen. The head is dark and the antennae are yellowish-brown. The surface is entirely dull tomentose, except for the shiny labroclypeus. The upper surface has numerous white scale-like hairs forming almost uniform transverse stripe patterns on the intervals. The pronotum and elytra have erect, long, thin setae.

== Etymology ==
The species is named after its collector, Jan Bezdek.
