= Pachyserica squamifera =

Scientific classification
- Kingdom: Animalia
- Phylum: Arthropoda
- Class: Insecta
- Order: Coleoptera
- Suborder: Polyphaga
- Infraorder: Scarabaeiformia
- Family: Scarabaeidae
- Genus: Pachyserica
- Species: P. squamifera

Binomial name
- Pachyserica squamifera (Frey, 1972)

Synonyms
- Serica squamifera Frey, 1972

Species of beetle

Pachyserica squamifera is a species of beetle of the family Scarabaeidae. It is found in China (Fujian).

== Description ==
Adults reach a length of about 8.3 mm. They have a reddish-brown, oblong-oval body. The antennae are yellowish-brown. The surface is almost entirely dull. The upper surface has numerous white scale-like hairs and the elytra is without erect setae.
