= Pachyserica albosignata =

Scientific classification
- Kingdom: Animalia
- Phylum: Arthropoda
- Clade: Pancrustacea
- Class: Insecta
- Order: Coleoptera
- Suborder: Polyphaga
- Infraorder: Scarabaeiformia
- Family: Scarabaeidae
- Genus: Pachyserica
- Species: P. albosignata

Binomial name
- Pachyserica albosignata (Moser, 1915)

Synonyms
- Serica albosignata Moser, 1915

Species of beetle

Pachyserica albosignata is a species of beetle of the family Scarabaeidae. It is found in China (Guangdong, Shandong).

== Description ==
Adults reach a length of about 6.9–8.4 mm. They have a dark reddish-brown, elongate-oval body, with the elytral stripes and legs somewhat lighter. The antennae are yellowish-brown. The surface is almost entirely dull. The upper surface has numerous white scale-like hairs and the elytra is without long, erect setae.
