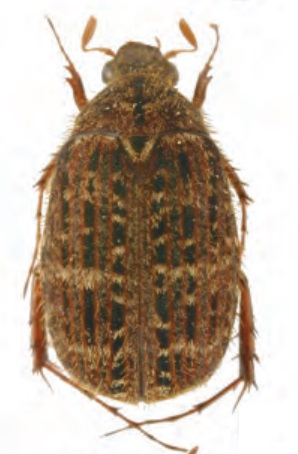

Scientific classification
- Kingdom: Animalia
- Phylum: Arthropoda
- Class: Insecta
- Order: Coleoptera
- Suborder: Polyphaga
- Infraorder: Scarabaeiformia
- Family: Scarabaeidae
- Genus: Pachyserica
- Species: P. darjeelingensis

Binomial name
- Pachyserica darjeelingensis Ahrens, 2004

= Pachyserica darjeelingensis =

Species of beetle

Pachyserica darjeelingensis is a species of beetle of the family Scarabaeidae. It is found in eastern Nepal and India (Sikkim, Darjeeling).

== Description ==
Adults reach a length of about 8.6-9.3 mm. They have a reddish to dark brown, elongate-oval body. The antennae are yellowish-brown and the dorsal surface is dull with white hairs and erect, long, thin setae.

== Etymology ==
The species is named for its occurrence in Darjeeling.
