= Pachyserica huanglianensis =

Scientific classification
- Kingdom: Animalia
- Phylum: Arthropoda
- Class: Insecta
- Order: Coleoptera
- Suborder: Polyphaga
- Infraorder: Scarabaeiformia
- Family: Scarabaeidae
- Genus: Pachyserica
- Species: P. huanglianensis

Binomial name
- Pachyserica huanglianensis Ahrens, 2006

Species of beetle

Pachyserica huanglianensis is a species of beetle of the family Scarabaeidae. It is found in China (Yunnan).

== Description ==
Adults reach a length of about 9.4–10 mm. They have a dark brown, elongate-oval body, partly with a greenish iridescent sheen. The antennae are yellowish-brown. The surface is entirely dull (except for the shiny labroclypeus). The upper surface has numerous fine, diffusely arranged, white scale-like hairs and a few erect, short, thin scale-like hairs.

== Etymology ==
The species is named after its type locality, Huanglian Shan.
