= Pachyserica putaoensis =

Scientific classification
- Kingdom: Animalia
- Phylum: Arthropoda
- Class: Insecta
- Order: Coleoptera
- Suborder: Polyphaga
- Infraorder: Scarabaeiformia
- Family: Scarabaeidae
- Genus: Pachyserica
- Species: P. putaoensis

Binomial name
- Pachyserica putaoensis Ahrens, 2006

Species of beetle

Pachyserica putaoensis is a species of beetle of the family Scarabaeidae. It is found in Myanmar.

== Description ==
Adults reach a length of about 8.6–9.4 mm. They have a dark brown, elongate-oval body, partly with a reddish-brown or greenish sheen. The antennae are yellowish-brown. The surface is completely dull, except for the shiny labroclypeus. The upper surface has numerous white, elongated scale-like hairs and numerous dense, erect, long, thin setae.

== Etymology ==
The species name refers to its type locality, Putao.
