= Pachyserica jendeki =

Scientific classification
- Kingdom: Animalia
- Phylum: Arthropoda
- Class: Insecta
- Order: Coleoptera
- Suborder: Polyphaga
- Infraorder: Scarabaeiformia
- Family: Scarabaeidae
- Genus: Pachyserica
- Species: P. jendeki

Binomial name
- Pachyserica jendeki Ahrens, 2004

Species of beetle

Pachyserica jendeki is a species of beetle of the family Scarabaeidae. It is found in India (Darjeeling, Meghalaya, Assam), northern Myanmar and northern Thailand.

== Description ==
Adults reach a length of about 7 mm. They have a dark brown, elongate-oval body, but reddish-brown in some areas or with a greenish sheen. The antennae are yellowish-brown and the dorsal surface is dull with white hairs and erect, long, thin setae.

== Etymology ==
The species is named for Eduard Jendek.
