= Pachyserica cipingensis =

Scientific classification
- Kingdom: Animalia
- Phylum: Arthropoda
- Class: Insecta
- Order: Coleoptera
- Suborder: Polyphaga
- Infraorder: Scarabaeiformia
- Family: Scarabaeidae
- Genus: Pachyserica
- Species: P. cipingensis

Binomial name
- Pachyserica cipingensis Ahrens, 2006

Species of beetle

Pachyserica cipingensis is a species of beetle of the family Scarabaeidae. It is found in China (Hunan, Jiangxi).

== Description ==
Adults reach a length of about 8.3 mm. They have a reddish-brown, oval body. The pronotum and the head are dark brown with a greenish sheen, while the antennae are yellowish-brown. There are numerous white, very short scale-like hairs on the upper surface, while the elytra are without erect setae.

== Etymology ==
The species is named after its type locality, Ciping.
