= Pachyserica garoensis =

Scientific classification
- Kingdom: Animalia
- Phylum: Arthropoda
- Class: Insecta
- Order: Coleoptera
- Suborder: Polyphaga
- Infraorder: Scarabaeiformia
- Family: Scarabaeidae
- Genus: Pachyserica
- Species: P. garoensis

Binomial name
- Pachyserica garoensis Ahrens, 2006

Species of beetle

Pachyserica garoensis is a species of beetle of the family Scarabaeidae. It is found in India (Meghalaya) and Myanmar.

== Description ==
Adults reach a length of about 10.4–11 mm (0.41–0.43 in). They have a dark brown, elongate-oval body, with a partially greenish sheen. The antennae are yellowish-brown. The surface is completely dull tomentose, except for the shiny labroclypeus. The upper surface has numerous white scale-like hairs and the pronotum and elytra have some erect, long, thin setae.

== Etymology ==
The species name refers to its occurrence in the Garo Hills.
