= Pachyserica dieuthuyae =

Scientific classification
- Kingdom: Animalia
- Phylum: Arthropoda
- Class: Insecta
- Order: Coleoptera
- Suborder: Polyphaga
- Infraorder: Scarabaeiformia
- Family: Scarabaeidae
- Genus: Pachyserica
- Species: P. dieuthuyae

Binomial name
- Pachyserica dieuthuyae Ahrens, Zhao, Pham & Liu, 2024

Species of beetle

Pachyserica dieuthuyae is a species of beetle of the family Scarabaeidae. It is found in Vietnam.

== Description ==
Adults reach a length of about 8.8–9.5 mm. They have a dark brown, oval and strongly convex body. The dorsal surface has a strong greenish, iridescent shine. The elytra are without dark spots and the antennae are yellow. The dorsal and ventral surface have fine, partly patchily distributed or dense, short, white or yellowish setae or scales. There are a few long, fine, erect, yellow setae on the head, pronotum and anterior elytra.

== Etymology ==
The species is named after the collector of the species, Ms. Dinh Dieu Thuy.
