= Pachyserica scalaris =

Scientific classification
- Kingdom: Animalia
- Phylum: Arthropoda
- Class: Insecta
- Order: Coleoptera
- Suborder: Polyphaga
- Infraorder: Scarabaeiformia
- Family: Scarabaeidae
- Genus: Pachyserica
- Species: P. scalaris

Binomial name
- Pachyserica scalaris Arrow, 1946

Species of beetle

Pachyserica scalaris is a species of beetle of the family Scarabaeidae. It is found in Myanmar.

== Description ==
Adults reach a length of about 9.11–10.5 mm. They have a reddish-brown, elongate, egg-shaped oval body, with dark spots and partially with a greenish sheen. The antennae are yellowish-brown. The surface is entirely dull tomentose, except for the shiny labroclypeus. The upper surface has numerous white scale-like hairs forming almost uniform transverse stripe patterns on the intervals. The pronotum and elytra have a few erect, long, thin setae.
