= Pachyserica collaris =

Scientific classification
- Kingdom: Animalia
- Phylum: Arthropoda
- Class: Insecta
- Order: Coleoptera
- Suborder: Polyphaga
- Infraorder: Scarabaeiformia
- Family: Scarabaeidae
- Genus: Pachyserica
- Species: P. collaris

Binomial name
- Pachyserica collaris Ahrens, 2006

Species of beetle

Pachyserica collaris is a species of beetle of the family Scarabaeidae. It is found in India (Assam, Meghalaya).

== Description ==
Adults reach a length of about 8.6–9.3 mm. They have a dark reddish-brown, elongate-oval, partly with dark spots. The antennae are yellowish-brown. The surface is entirely dull, except for the shiny labroclypeus. The upper surface has numerous fine, white scale-like hairs arranged in patches, as well as dense, erect, long, thin setae.

== Etymology ==
The species name is derived from Latin collaris (meaning neck).
