= Pachyserica albopunctata =

Scientific classification
- Kingdom: Animalia
- Phylum: Arthropoda
- Class: Insecta
- Order: Coleoptera
- Suborder: Polyphaga
- Infraorder: Scarabaeiformia
- Family: Scarabaeidae
- Genus: Pachyserica
- Species: P. albopunctata

Binomial name
- Pachyserica albopunctata Zhao & Ahrens, 2023

Species of beetle

Pachyserica albopunctata is a species of beetle of the family Scarabaeidae. It is found in China (Guangdong, Guangxi).

== Description ==
Adults reach a length of about 9.7–10.5 mm. They have an ovoid body. The antennae, palpi and legs are shiny. The body is generally reddish brown with grass greenish toment, while the apical half of the elytra is somewhat paler. The antennae are yellow.

== Etymology ==
The species name is derived from Latin albus and punctatus and refers to the whitish markings on the elytra, aggregated with scale-like setae.
