= Pachyserica bistriata =

Scientific classification
- Kingdom: Animalia
- Phylum: Arthropoda
- Class: Insecta
- Order: Coleoptera
- Suborder: Polyphaga
- Infraorder: Scarabaeiformia
- Family: Scarabaeidae
- Genus: Pachyserica
- Species: P. bistriata

Binomial name
- Pachyserica bistriata Ahrens, 2006

Species of beetle

Pachyserica bistriata is a species of beetle of the family Scarabaeidae. It is found in Vietnam.

== Description ==
Adults reach a length of about 8.9–9.5 mm. They have a dark reddish-brown, elongate, egg-shaped oval body, with a metallic greenish sheen. The antennae are yellowish-brown. The surface is entirely dull, except for the shiny labroclypeus. The upper surface has numerous white scale-like hairs and the pronotum and elytra have some erect, long, thin setae.

== Etymology ==
The species name is derived from Latin bi (meaning two) and striata (meaning striped).
