= Pachyserica conspersa =

Scientific classification
- Kingdom: Animalia
- Phylum: Arthropoda
- Class: Insecta
- Order: Coleoptera
- Suborder: Polyphaga
- Infraorder: Scarabaeiformia
- Family: Scarabaeidae
- Genus: Pachyserica
- Species: P. conspersa

Binomial name
- Pachyserica conspersa Ahrens, 2006

Species of beetle

Pachyserica conspersa is a species of beetle of the family Scarabaeidae. It is found in China (Guizhou, Hubei).

== Description ==
Adults reach a length of about 8.1–8.7 mm. They have a dark reddish-brown, elongate-oval body, partly with a greenish sheen. The antennae are yellowish-brown. The surface is entirely dull (except for the shiny labroclypeus). The upper surface has numerous fine, diffusely arranged, white scale-like hairs and loose, erect, long, thin setae.

== Etymology ==
The species name is derived from Latin conspersus.
