= Pachyserica hoabinhensis =

Scientific classification
- Kingdom: Animalia
- Phylum: Arthropoda
- Class: Insecta
- Order: Coleoptera
- Suborder: Polyphaga
- Infraorder: Scarabaeiformia
- Family: Scarabaeidae
- Genus: Pachyserica
- Species: P. hoabinhensis

Binomial name
- Pachyserica hoabinhensis Ahrens, Zhao, Pham & Liu, 2024

Species of beetle

Pachyserica hoabinhensis is a species of beetle of the family Scarabaeidae. It is found in Vietnam.

== Description ==
Adults reach a length of about 10.6 mm. They have a dark brown, oval and strongly convex body. The dorsal surface has a strong greenish, iridescent shine. The elytra are without dark spots and the antenna are yellow. The dorsal and ventral surface have fine, partly patchily distributed, or dense, short, white or yellowish setae. There are a few long, fine, erect, yellow setae on the head, pronotum and anterior elytra.

== Etymology ==
The species is named after its occurrence in the Hoa Binh Province.
