= Pachyserica albosquamosa =

Scientific classification
- Kingdom: Animalia
- Phylum: Arthropoda
- Class: Insecta
- Order: Coleoptera
- Suborder: Polyphaga
- Infraorder: Scarabaeiformia
- Family: Scarabaeidae
- Genus: Pachyserica
- Species: P. albosquamosa

Binomial name
- Pachyserica albosquamosa Brenske, 1898

Species of beetle

Pachyserica albosquamosa is a species of beetle of the family Scarabaeidae. It has been recorded from Nepal and India (Garhwal Himalayas, Assam and the Khasi Hills).

== Description ==
Adults reach a length of about 8.5-8.9 mm. They have a dark brown, elongate-oval body, but reddish-brown in some areas or with a greenish sheen. The antennae are yellowish-brown and the dorsal surface is dull with white hairs and erect, long, thin setae.
