= Pachyserica minax =

Scientific classification
- Kingdom: Animalia
- Phylum: Arthropoda
- Class: Insecta
- Order: Coleoptera
- Suborder: Polyphaga
- Infraorder: Scarabaeiformia
- Family: Scarabaeidae
- Genus: Pachyserica
- Species: P. minax

Binomial name
- Pachyserica minax Ahrens & Fabrizi, 2009

Species of beetle

Pachyserica minax is a species of beetle of the family Scarabaeidae. It is found in China (Xizang).

== Description ==
Adults reach a length of about 10.3 mm. They have a dark reddish brown, oval body. Part of the head, pronotum and spots on the elytra are also dark brown, but sometimes dark green. The antennae are yellowish brown and the legs are dark brown. The dorsal surface is mostly dull and densely setose.

== Etymology ==
The species name is derived from Latin minax (meaning prominent).
