= Pachyserica wangzizhaoi =

Scientific classification
- Kingdom: Animalia
- Phylum: Arthropoda
- Class: Insecta
- Order: Coleoptera
- Suborder: Polyphaga
- Infraorder: Scarabaeiformia
- Family: Scarabaeidae
- Genus: Pachyserica
- Species: P. wangzizhaoi

Binomial name
- Pachyserica wangzizhaoi Ahrens, Zhao, Pham & Liu, 2024

Species of beetle

Pachyserica wangzizhaoi is a species of beetle of the family Scarabaeidae. It is found in China (Guangdong).

== Description ==
Adults reach a length of about 9–10.3 mm. They have an oblong-oval and convex body. The body (including legs) is reddish brown, the antennae are more yellowish, the midline of the pronotum and irregular markings on the elytra are dark green. The dorsal surface is dull, the frons with dark toment and the head and pronotum with yellow, erect, long setae. The entire body has dense, white, lanceolate setae, the elytra additionally with sparse, longer but semierect setae.

== Etymology ==
The species is named after one of the collectors, Mr. Zi-Zhao Wang.
