= Pachyserica sapae =

Scientific classification
- Kingdom: Animalia
- Phylum: Arthropoda
- Class: Insecta
- Order: Coleoptera
- Suborder: Polyphaga
- Infraorder: Scarabaeiformia
- Family: Scarabaeidae
- Genus: Pachyserica
- Species: P. sapae

Binomial name
- Pachyserica sapae Ahrens, 2006

Species of beetle

Pachyserica sapae is a species of beetle of the family Scarabaeidae. It is found in Vietnam.

== Description ==
Adults reach a length of about 9.7 mm. They have a dark reddish-brown, elongate, egg-shaped oval body, with a metallic greenish sheen. The antennae are yellowish-brown. The surface is entirely dull, except for the shiny labroclypeus. The upper surface has numerous white scale-like hairs and the pronotum and elytra have several erect, long, thin setae.

== Etymology ==
The species is named after its type locality, Sa Pa.
