= Pachyserica interruptolineata =

Scientific classification
- Kingdom: Animalia
- Phylum: Arthropoda
- Class: Insecta
- Order: Coleoptera
- Suborder: Polyphaga
- Infraorder: Scarabaeiformia
- Family: Scarabaeidae
- Genus: Pachyserica
- Species: P. interruptolineata

Binomial name
- Pachyserica interruptolineata Ahrens, 2006

Species of beetle

Pachyserica interruptolineata is a species of beetle of the family Scarabaeidae. It is found in Myanmar.

== Description ==
Adults reach a length of about 7.2–7.3 mm. They have a reddish or dark brown, elongate-oval body, partly with dark spots. The antennae are yellowish-brown. The surface is entirely dull, except for the shiny labroclypeus. The upper surface has numerous fine, white, patchy, scale-like hairs and dense, erect, moderately long, thin setae.

== Etymology ==
The species name is derived from Latin interruptus (meaning interrupted) and lineatus (meaning lined).
