= Pachyserica horishana =

Scientific classification
- Kingdom: Animalia
- Phylum: Arthropoda
- Class: Insecta
- Order: Coleoptera
- Suborder: Polyphaga
- Infraorder: Scarabaeiformia
- Family: Scarabaeidae
- Genus: Pachyserica
- Species: P. horishana

Binomial name
- Pachyserica horishana (Niijima & Kinoshita, 1927)

Synonyms
- Serica horishana Niijima & Kinoshita, 1927

Species of beetle

Pachyserica horishana is a species of beetle of the family Scarabaeidae. It is found in Taiwan.

== Description ==
Adults reach a length of about 10.1 mm. They have a dark brown, oval body. The elytral stripes and legs are reddish-brown and the antennae are yellowish-brown. The surface is almost entirely tomentose except for the labroclypeus and the upper surface has white scale-like hairs. The elytra are without erect setae.
