= Pachyserica sanqingshanensis =

Scientific classification
- Kingdom: Animalia
- Phylum: Arthropoda
- Class: Insecta
- Order: Coleoptera
- Suborder: Polyphaga
- Infraorder: Scarabaeiformia
- Family: Scarabaeidae
- Genus: Pachyserica
- Species: P. sanqingshanensis

Binomial name
- Pachyserica sanqingshanensis Ahrens, Zhao, Pham & Liu, 2024

Species of beetle

Pachyserica sanqingshanensis is a species of beetle of the family Scarabaeidae. It is found in China (Jiangxi).

== Description ==
Adults reach a length of about 9.7 mm. They have an oblong-oval and convex body. The body (including legs) is reddish brown. Each centre of the elytron has a darker patch behind the middle and before the apex. The antennae are more yellowish, the midline of the pronotum and irregular markings on the elytra are dark green. The dorsal surface is dull, the frons with dark toment. The head and pronotum have yellow, erect long setae and the entire body has dense, white, scale-like setae. The elytra has sparse, larger but semierect ones.

== Etymology ==
The species is named after its type locality, Mount Sanqingshan in Jiangxi.
