= Pachyserica chenchangchini =

Scientific classification
- Kingdom: Animalia
- Phylum: Arthropoda
- Class: Insecta
- Order: Coleoptera
- Suborder: Polyphaga
- Infraorder: Scarabaeiformia
- Family: Scarabaeidae
- Genus: Pachyserica
- Species: P. chenchangchini

Binomial name
- Pachyserica chenchangchini Ahrens, Zhao, Pham & Liu, 2024

Species of beetle

Pachyserica chenchangchini is a species of beetle of the family Scarabaeidae. It is found in China (Yunnan).

== Description ==
Adults reach a length of about 8 mm. They have a reddish brown, oval and strongly convex body. The legs are also reddish brown, and the frons has dark green toment. The pronotum has a green shine and the elytra have large, dark spots. The antennae are yellow. The dorsal surface is weakly iridescent, with fine, partly patchily distributed, or dense, short, white setae. There are long, fine, erect, yellow setae on the head, pronotum and anterior elytra.

== Etymology ==
The species is named after Mr. Chang-Chin Chen.
