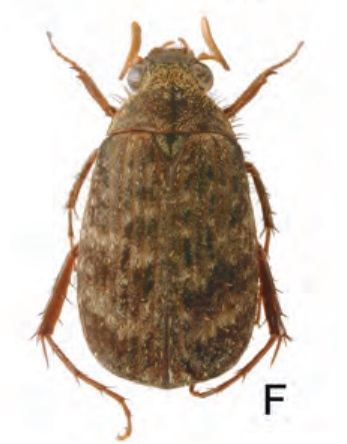

Scientific classification
- Kingdom: Animalia
- Phylum: Arthropoda
- Class: Insecta
- Order: Coleoptera
- Suborder: Polyphaga
- Infraorder: Scarabaeiformia
- Family: Scarabaeidae
- Genus: Pachyserica
- Species: P. marmorata

Binomial name
- Pachyserica marmorata (Blanchard, 1850)

Synonyms
- Omaloplia marmorata Blanchard, 1850; Serica marmorata

= Pachyserica marmorata =

Species of beetle

Pachyserica marmorata is a species of beetle of the family Scarabaeidae. It is found in India (Kumaon) and the Himalaya in Nepal.

== Description ==
Adults reach a length of about 8.4–9 mm. They have a dark brown, elongate body, but reddish-brown in some areas or with a greenish sheen. The antennae are yellowish-brown and the dorsal surface is dull with white hairs and erect, long, thin setae.
