= Pachyserica motuo =

Scientific classification
- Kingdom: Animalia
- Phylum: Arthropoda
- Class: Insecta
- Order: Coleoptera
- Suborder: Polyphaga
- Infraorder: Scarabaeiformia
- Family: Scarabaeidae
- Genus: Pachyserica
- Species: P. motuo

Binomial name
- Pachyserica motuo Ahrens, Zhao, Pham & Liu, 2024

Species of beetle

Pachyserica motuo is a species of beetle of the family Scarabaeidae. It is found in China (Xizang).

== Description ==
Adults reach a length of about 11.2–11.5 mm. They have a dark brown, oval and strongly convex body. The dorsal surface has a greenish shine. The elytra are slightly lighter, with dark spots. The antennae are yellow. The dorsal surface has a weak iridescent shine, and fine, partly patchily distributed, or dense, short, white or yellowish setae. There are long fine erect, yellow setae on the head, pronotum and anterior elytra.

== Etymology ==
The species is named after its type locality, Mutuo.
