= Serica chingkinyui =

Scientific classification
- Kingdom: Animalia
- Phylum: Arthropoda
- Class: Insecta
- Order: Coleoptera
- Suborder: Polyphaga
- Infraorder: Scarabaeiformia
- Family: Scarabaeidae
- Genus: Serica
- Species: S. chingkinyui

Binomial name
- Serica chingkinyui Kobayashi, 1993

Synonyms
- Pachyserica brevitarsis Kobayashi & Yu, 1996

Species of beetle

Serica chingkinyui is a species of beetle of the family Scarabaeidae. It is found in Taiwan.
