= Sunkoshi River =

River in Nepal

Sunkoshi
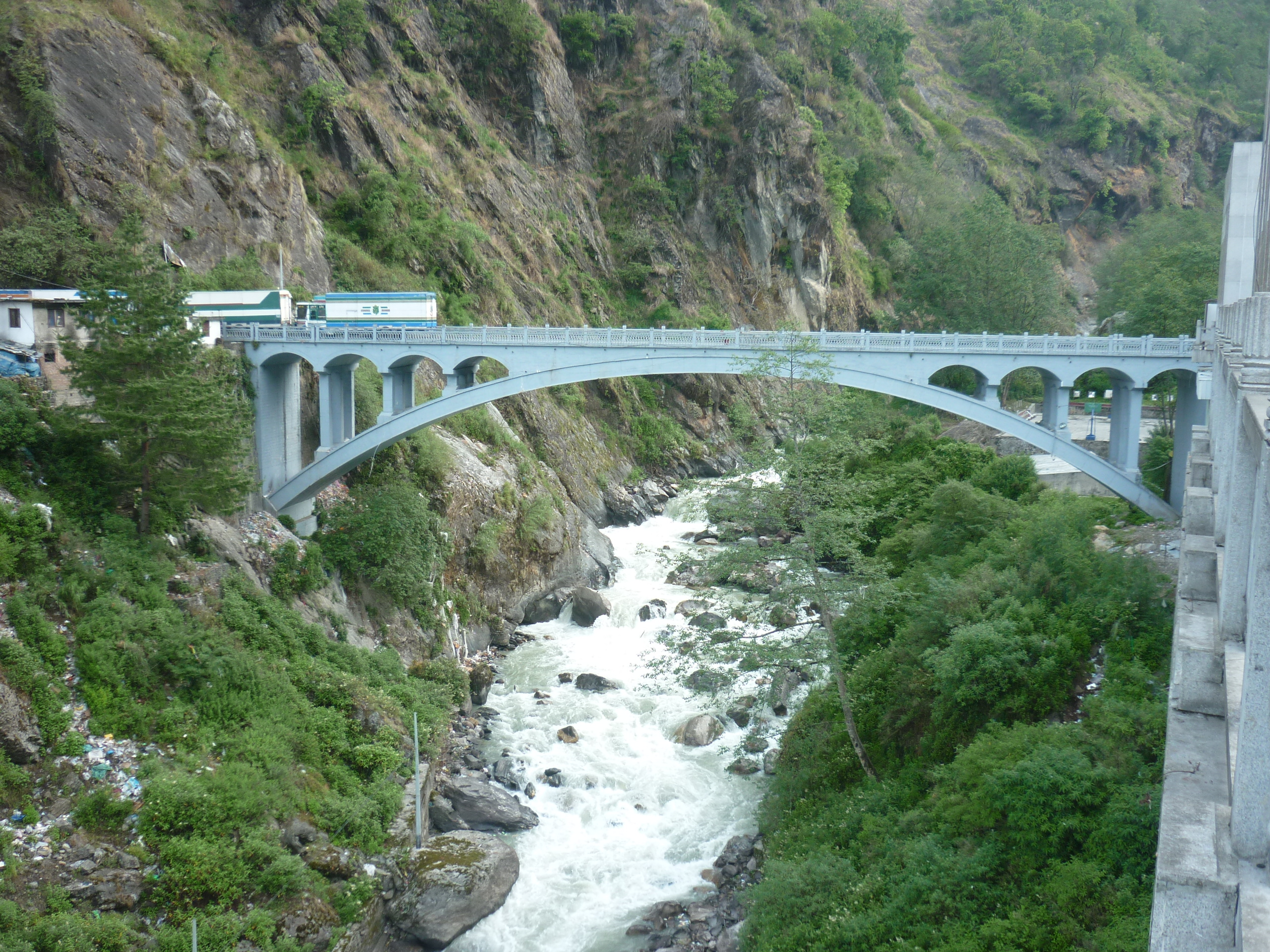
- The Sino-Nepal Friendship Bridge over Bhote Koshi at Kodari

Location
- Country: Tibet, Nepal

Physical characteristics
- Source
  - location: Choukati, Nepal
  - coordinates: 27°45′23″N 86°00′11″E
  - elevation: 2,400 m (7,900 ft)
- 2nd source
  - location: Nyalam County, Tibet
  - coordinates: 28°27′09″N 86°18′24″E
  - elevation: 5,300 m (17,400 ft)
- Mouth
  - location: Confluence with Arun and Tamur to form Saptkoshi at Trivenighat, Nepal
  - coordinates: 26°54′37″N 87°09′41″E
  - elevation: 640 m (2,100 ft)

Basin features
- River system: Koshi River
- Tributaries
  - left: Tamba Koshi, Likhu Khola, Dudh Koshi
  - right: Bhote Koshi, Indravati River

The Sunkoshi, also spelled Sunkosi, is a river that is part of the Koshi or Saptkoshi River system in Nepal. Sunkoshi has two source streams, one that arises within Nepal in Choukati, and the other more significant stream that flows in from Nyalam County in the Tibet region of China. The latter is called Bhote Koshi in Nepal and Matsang Tsangpo in Tibet. (Note: An alternative Tibetan name Bö Chu (Tibetan: བོད་ཆུ, Wylie: bod chu), also spelt Po Chu or Poi Chu, is also used in sources. It would appear to be a literal translation of Bhote Kosi ("Tibetan river").) Due to the significant flows from Bhote Koshi, the Sun Koshi river basin is often regarded as a trans-border river basin.

== River course ==
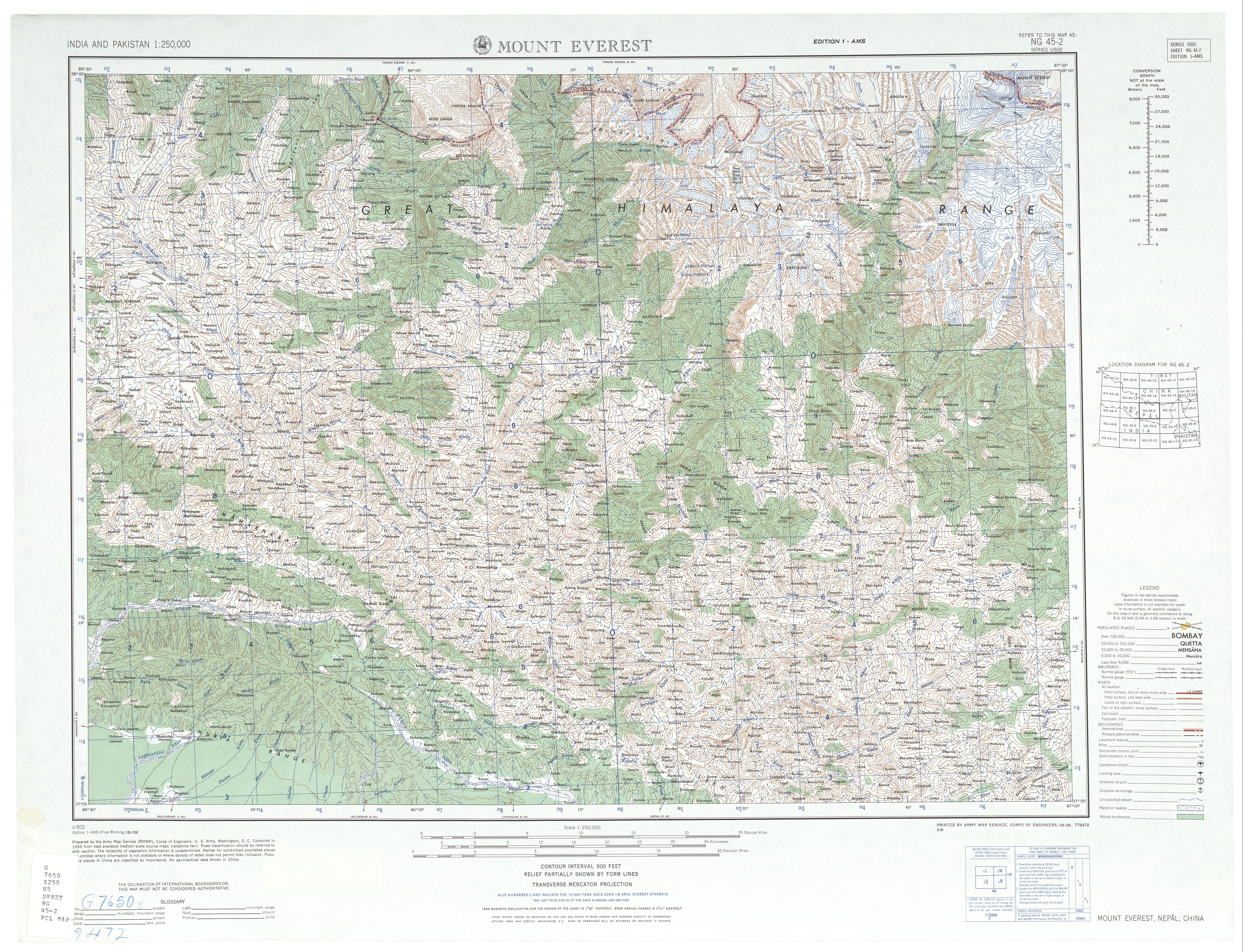
Map showing the course of Sun Koshi (AMS, 1955)

The Sunkoshi's headwaters are located in the Zhangzangbo Glacier in Tibet. Both Sunkoshi and Bhote Koshi river courses together form one basin that covers an area of about 3,394 km^{2} (1,310 sq mi).

The Indravati meets the Sunkoshi at Dolaghat, where it is followed by the Arniko Rajmarg. From there, the Sunkoshi flows eastwards through the valley formed between the Mahabharat Range and the Himalayas. The Tamakosi, Likhu, Dudhkosi, Arun and Tamor are its left tributaries and Indravati is the right tributary.

The average annual flow is 2.2 × 10^{10} m^{3}. The average sediment load is 5.4 × 10^{7} m^{3}.

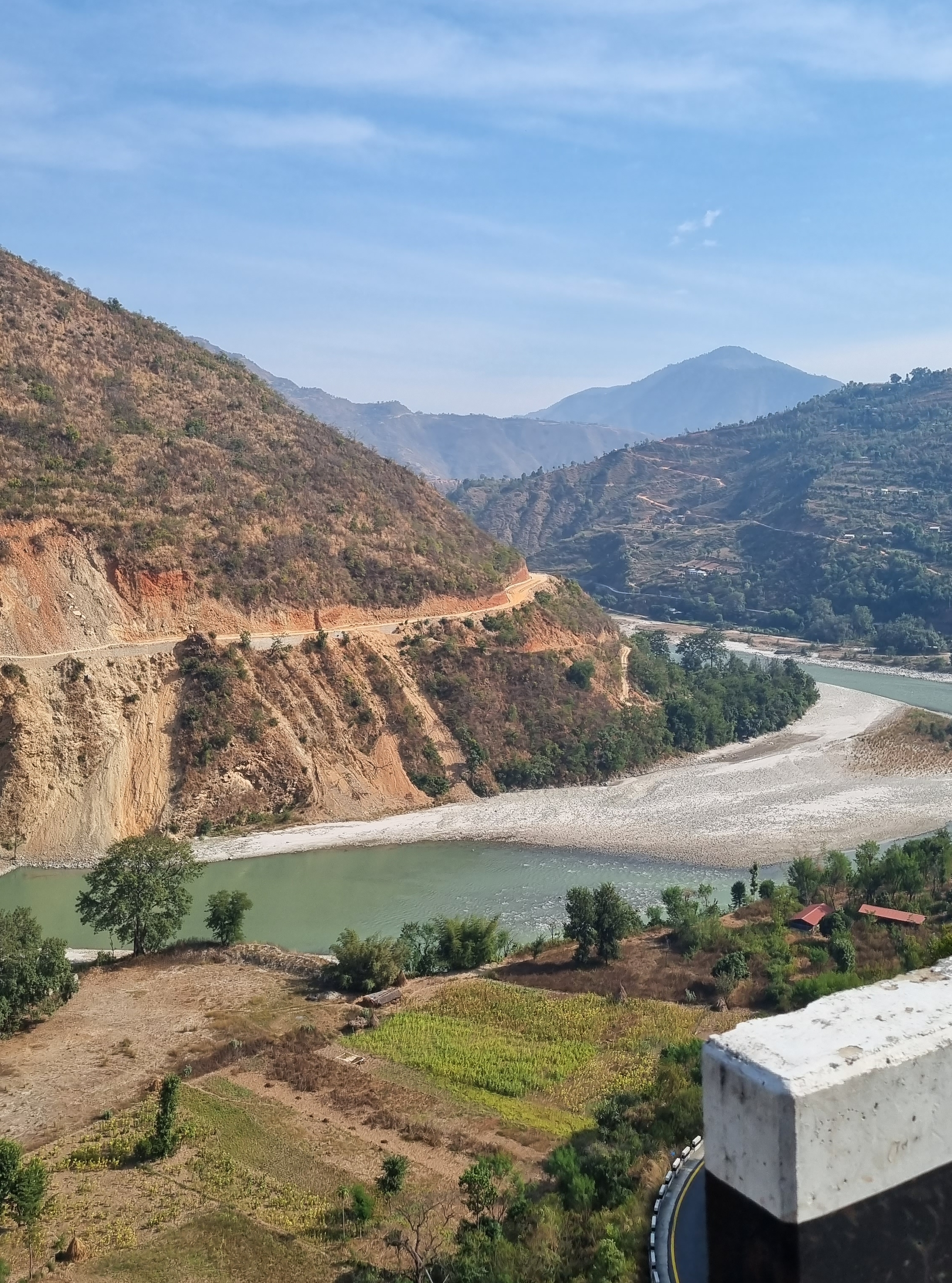
Sunkoshi river in December 2023

The Tamur and the Arun rivers join the Sunkoshi at Tribenighat to form the Saptkoshi, which flows through the Chatra Gorge across the Mahabharat Range onto the Gangetic plain.

== Names and etymology ==
In Nepali language, the word "sun" means gold and golden; and the word "kosi" means river.

== Koshi River system ==
The Koshi River drains eastern Nepal. It is also known as Saptkoshi River because of the seven rivers joining in east-central Nepal to form this river. The main rivers forming the Koshi River system are Sunkoshi, Indravati, Tamba Koshi, Bhote Koshi, Dudh Kosi, Arun and Tamur Rivers. The Saptkoshi River flows through the Chatra Gorge in a southerly direction into northern Bihar and joins the Ganges.

The Sunkoshi contributes about 44% of the total water of the Saptakoshi, the Arun 37% and the Tamur 19%.

== Infrastructures ==
- Sunkosi–Kamala multipurpose project: The Sunkoshi has a 90% reliable flow of 126 cubic metres per second (4,400 cu ft/s). It was proposed to divert the water from a small weir across the river near Kurule through a 16.6 km (10.3 mi) tunnel and a 61.4 MW associated powerhouse to the Kamala River, flowing through central Nepal. Some 72 cubic metres per second (2,500 cu ft/s) of water would be transferred to the Kamala River for the irrigation and further generation of power.

== Hazards ==
In July 1981, a sudden ice avalanche caused a glacial lake outburst flood in the moraine-dammed Zhangzangbu-Cho Lake in the headwaters of the Poiqu in Tibet. The ensuing debris flow destroyed bridges, and sections of both the Arniko and the Nepal–China highways.

On 2 August 2014, a landslide at Jure blocked the river downstream from Barabise and created a large lake that submerged a hydropower station. This huge rockslide of approximately 5,000,000 m^{3} (180,000,000 cu ft) blocked the Sunkoshi River upstream of Jure village. This landslide killed approximately 155 people and destroyed approximately 120 houses completely and 37 partially. The area was declared a flood crisis zone, and local communities were evacuated. The power supply was interrupted, and the Arniko Highway was blocked.

== Water sports ==
The Sunkoshi is used for both rafting and intermediate kayaking. It has grade III-IV rapids. The most common put-in point of a Sunkoshi river trip is Dolaghat, at an elevation of 620 m (2,030 ft) and it ends at the Chatra Gorge at 115 m (377 ft), a distance of around 272 km (169 mi).

The first successful descent of the Sunkoshi was made in late September 1970 by Daniel C. Taylor, Terry Bech, Cheri Bremer-Kamp, and Carl Schiffler. They entered the river at Dolaghat and exited at the Nepal-India border. Their expedition took four days. Before this successful trip, there were four known unsuccessful attempts to descend the river, and one unsuccessful attempt to ascend the river in a jet boat under the leadership of Edmund Hillary.
