= Chatra Gorge =

River gorge in Nepal

- Location within Nepal
- Length: 10 kilometres (6.2 mi) N-S
- Width: 5 to 8 kilometres (3.1 to 5.0 mi)

Geography
- Location: The Kosi cuts through Mahabharat Range, Nepal creating Chatra Gorge
- Coordinates: 26°52′07″N 87°09′07″E
- Interactive map of Chatra Gorge

The Chatra Gorge is a canyon cut by the Kosi River across the Mahabharat Range in Nepal.

== Kosi river system ==
The Kosi, or Sapt Kosi, drains eastern Nepal. It is known as Sapt Koshi because of the seven rivers which join together in east-central Nepal to form this river. The main rivers forming the Kosi system are – the Sun Kosi, the Indravati River, the Bhote Koshi, the Dudh Kosi, the Arun River, Barun River, and Tamur River. The combined river flows through the Chatra Gorge in a southerly direction to emerge from the hills.

The Sun Kosi contributes 44 per cent of the total water in the Sapt Koshi, the Arun 37 per cent and the Tamur 19 per cent.

Of the rivers that form the Sapt Kosi, the three main tributaries, the Sun Kosi, Arun and Tamur converge at Tribeni and enter Chatra Gorge.

== The Gorge ==
The Chatra Gorge is about 10 km long and is about 5–8 km wide. Downstream of the gorge, the river enters the alluvial plains forming a huge megafan covering around 16,000 km^{2}.

The gorge is located at 26°52′07″N 87°09′07″E. The initial or northern portion of the gorge is at an altitude of 115 metres (377 ft).

== Sapta Kosi High Dam ==
A 269 metres (883 ft) high dam is proposed to be built near Barahakshetra across the Sapta Kosi in the Chatra gorge. It will have a 3,000 MW power station and a barrage 8 km downstream with canals on both sides for irrigation.
