= Barun River =

Barun River Nepali: बरुण नदी
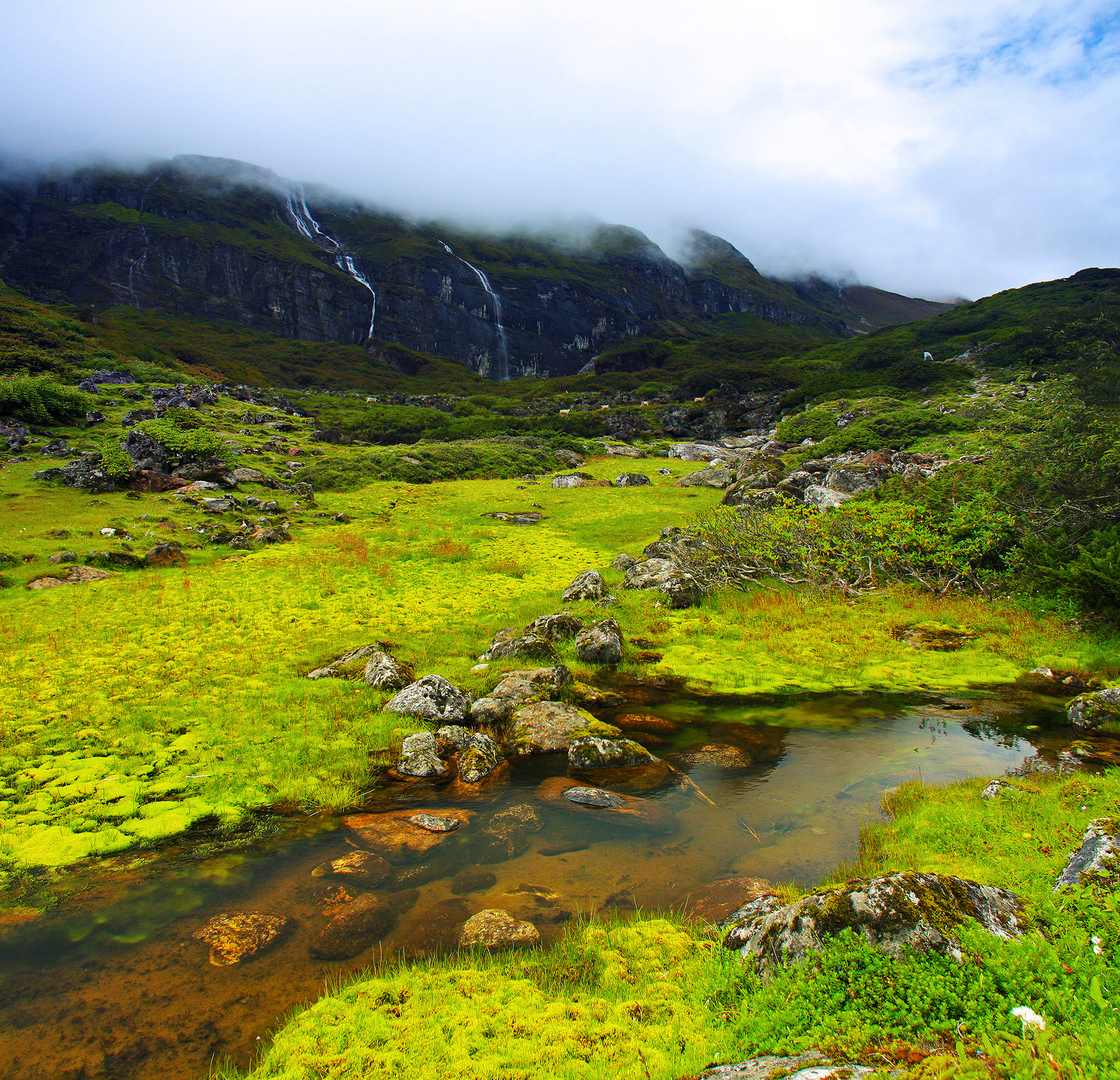
- Barun Valley

Location
- Country: Nepal

Physical characteristics
- Source
  - location: Makalu Glacier
- Mouth
  - location: Arun River
  - coordinates: 27°41′31″N 87°21′49″E

Basin features
- River system: Kosi River

The Barun River (Nepali: बरुण नदी) is a tributary of the Arun River and is part of the Koshi river system in Nepal.

== Koshi River System ==
The Koshi or Sapta Koshi drains eastern Nepal. It is known as Sapta Koshi because of the seven rivers which join together in east-central Nepal to form this river. The main rivers forming the Kosi system are – the Sun Kosi River, the Indravati River, the Bhote Koshi, the Dudh Kosi, the Arun River, Barun River, and Tamor River. The combined river flows through the Chatra Gorge in a southerly direction to emerge from the hills.

== Course ==
The Barun River originates from the Barun glacier at the base of Makalu, one of the eight-thousanders. The river freezes in winter and in summer outburst floods in the Barun valley are inevitable but lose much of their power and sediment passing through two broad flat areas.

The Barun is known as Chukchuwa in local Kirat language. Studies have shown that the area had been initially habituated by Yakkha and Limbu .

== Bird watching ==
The Upper Barun Valley is among the richest for birds in Nepal. It is virtually untouched by man. Birdwatchers have rarely visited the region because it is not easily accessible. There are no trekkers lodges within Makalu-Barun National Park. There is one small tea house at Langmale (near the Base Camp) run by a third-generation native of the upper Barun Valley. In an effort to control and consolidate the impacts of camping, the pitching of tents is only allowed in designated campsites.
