= Tamur River =

River in Nepal

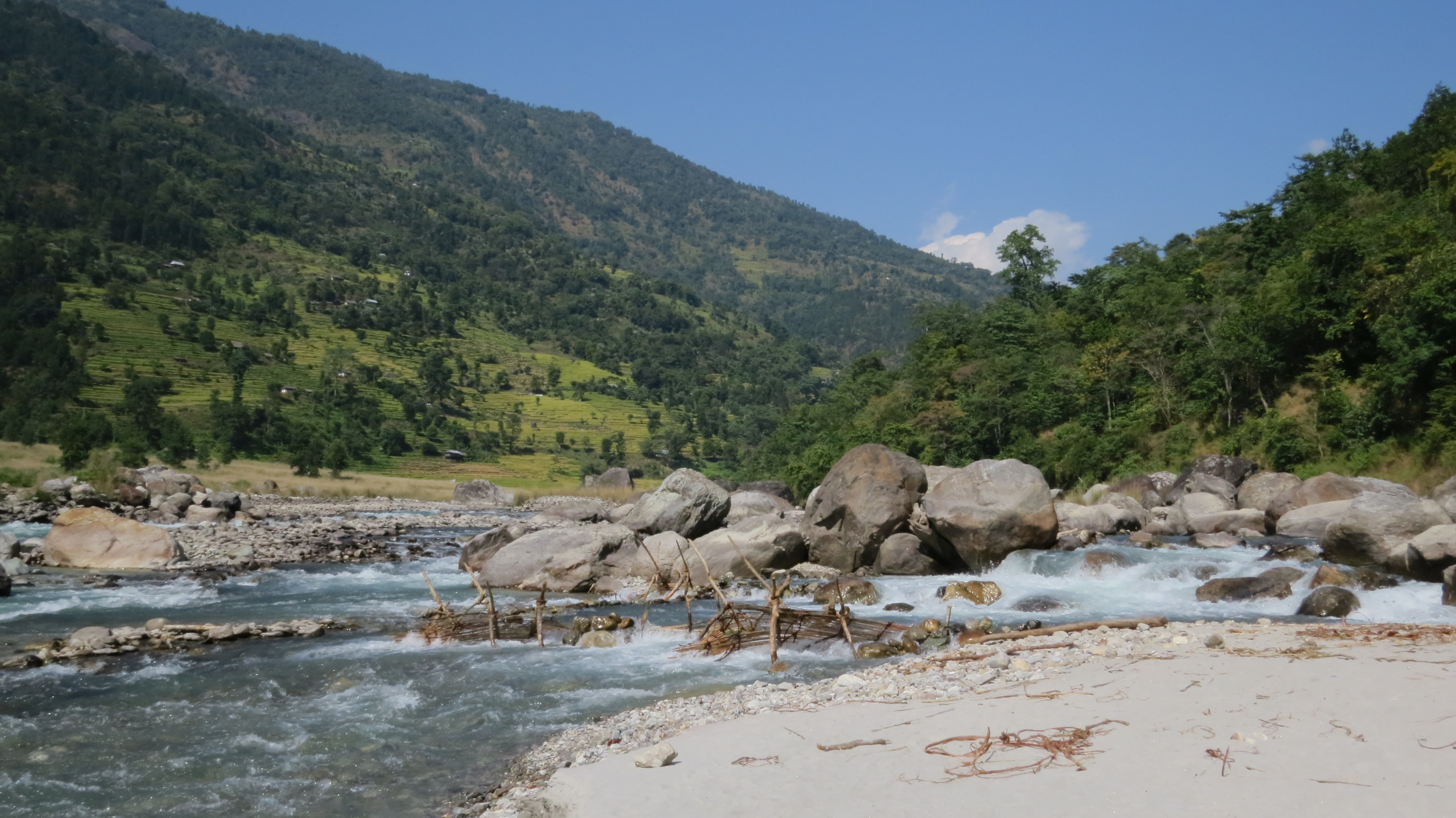

Location
- Country: Nepal

Physical characteristics
- Source
  - location: near Kanchenjunga
- Mouth
  - location: Confluence with Arun and Sun Koshi to form Sapta Koshi at Tribeni, Nepal
  - coordinates: 26°54′47″N 87°9′30″E

Basin features
- River system: Koshi River

The Tamur River is a major river in eastern Nepal, which begins around Kanchenjunga. The Tamor and the Arun join the Sun Koshi at Tribenighat to form the giant Saptakoshi which flows through Mahabharat Range on to the Gangetic plain.

== Koshi river system ==
The Koshi or Sapta Koshi drains eastern Nepal. It has been known as Sapta Koshi because of the seven rivers which join in east-central Nepal to form this river. The main rivers forming the Koshi system are – the Sun Koshi, the Indravati River, the Bhote Koshi, the Dudh Koshi, Arun River, Barun River, and Tamur River. The combined river flows through the Chatra Gorge in a southerly direction to emerge from the hills.

The Sun Koshi contributes 44 percent of the total water in the Sapta Koshi, the Arun 37 per cent and the Tamur 19 percent.
