= Tutse =

Mountain in Nepal

- Peak 6
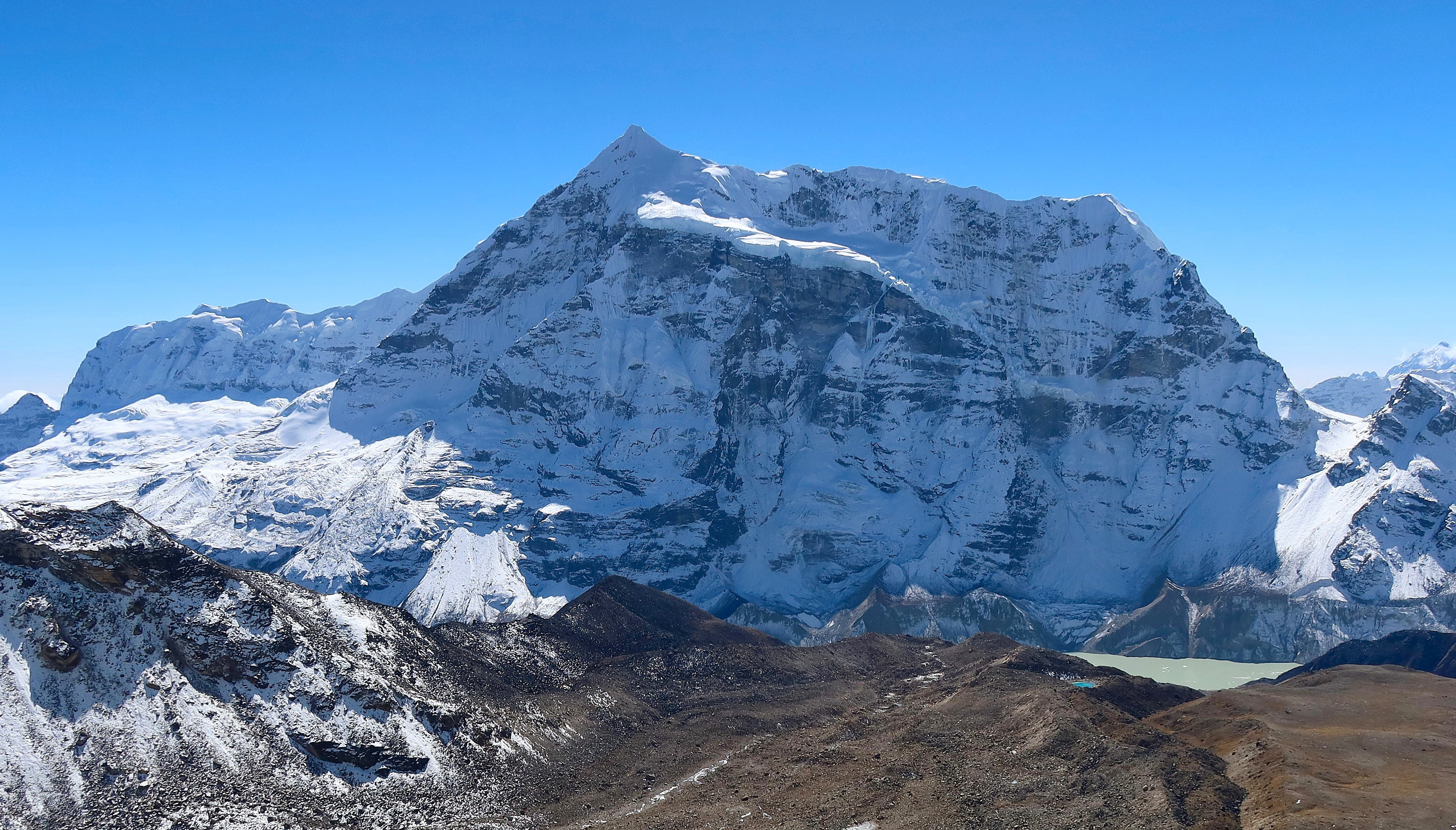
- North aspect

Highest point
- Elevation: 6,758 m (22,172 ft)
- Prominence: 1,438 m (4,718 ft)
- Parent peak: Chamlang
- Isolation: 7.98 km (4.96 mi)
- Coordinates: 27°46′19″N 87°06′05″E

Geography
- Location within Nepal
- Interactive map of Tutse
- Country: Nepal
- Province: Koshi
- District: Sankhuwasabha
- Protected area: Makalu Barun National Park
- Parent range: Himalaya; Mahalangur Himal

Tutse, also known as Tu Tse and Peak 6, is a mountain in Nepal.

== Description ==
Tutse is a 6,758-metre (22,172-foot) glaciated summit in the Nepalese Himalaya. It is situated 12 kilometres (7.5 mi) south of Makalu in Makalu Barun National Park. Precipitation runoff from the mountain's slopes drains into tributaries of the Arun River. Topographic relief is significant as the north face rises 2,150 metres (7,054 ft) above the Barun River Valley in two kilometres (1.2 mi). The first authorized attempt to climb the mountain was made in 2003, however the attempt to reach the summit was unsuccessful.

== Climate ==
Based on the Köppen climate classification, Tutse is located in a tundra climate zone with cold, snowy winters, and cool summers. Weather systems coming off the Bay of Bengal are forced upwards by the Himalaya mountains (orographic lift), causing heavy precipitation in the form of rainfall and snowfall. Mid-June through early-August is the monsoon season. The months of April, May, September, and October offer the most favorable weather for viewing or climbing this peak.

== Gallery ==
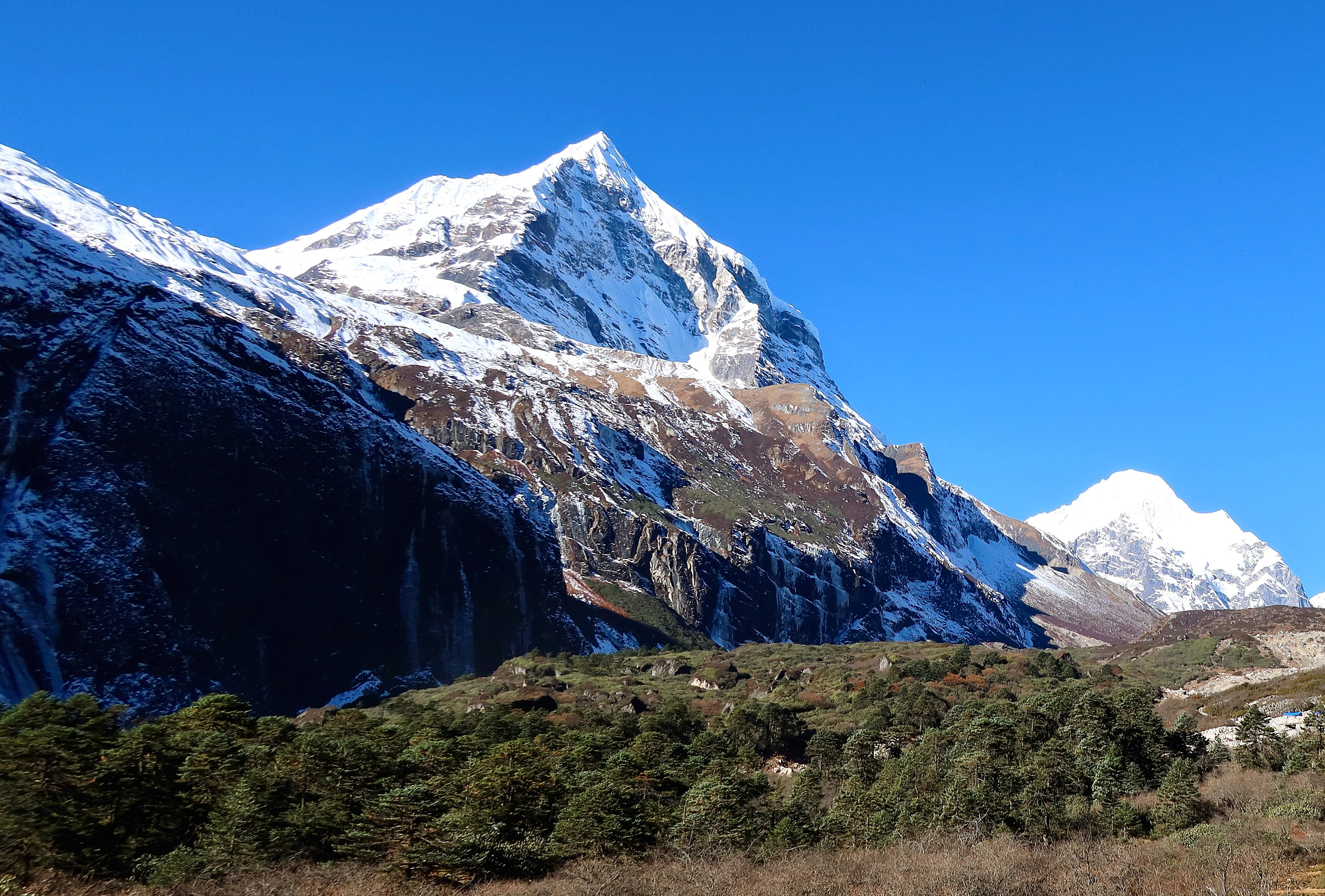
Northeast aspect

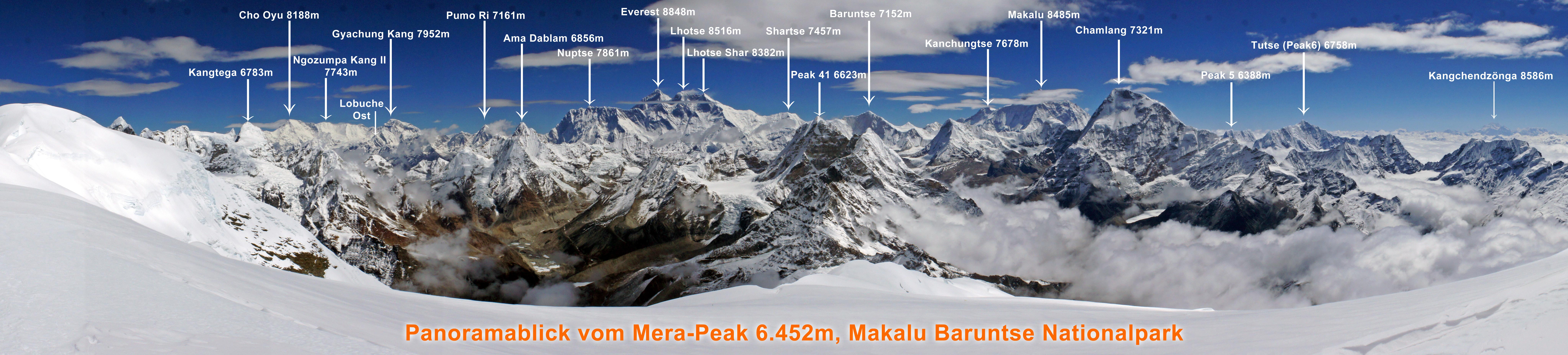
Tutse to right

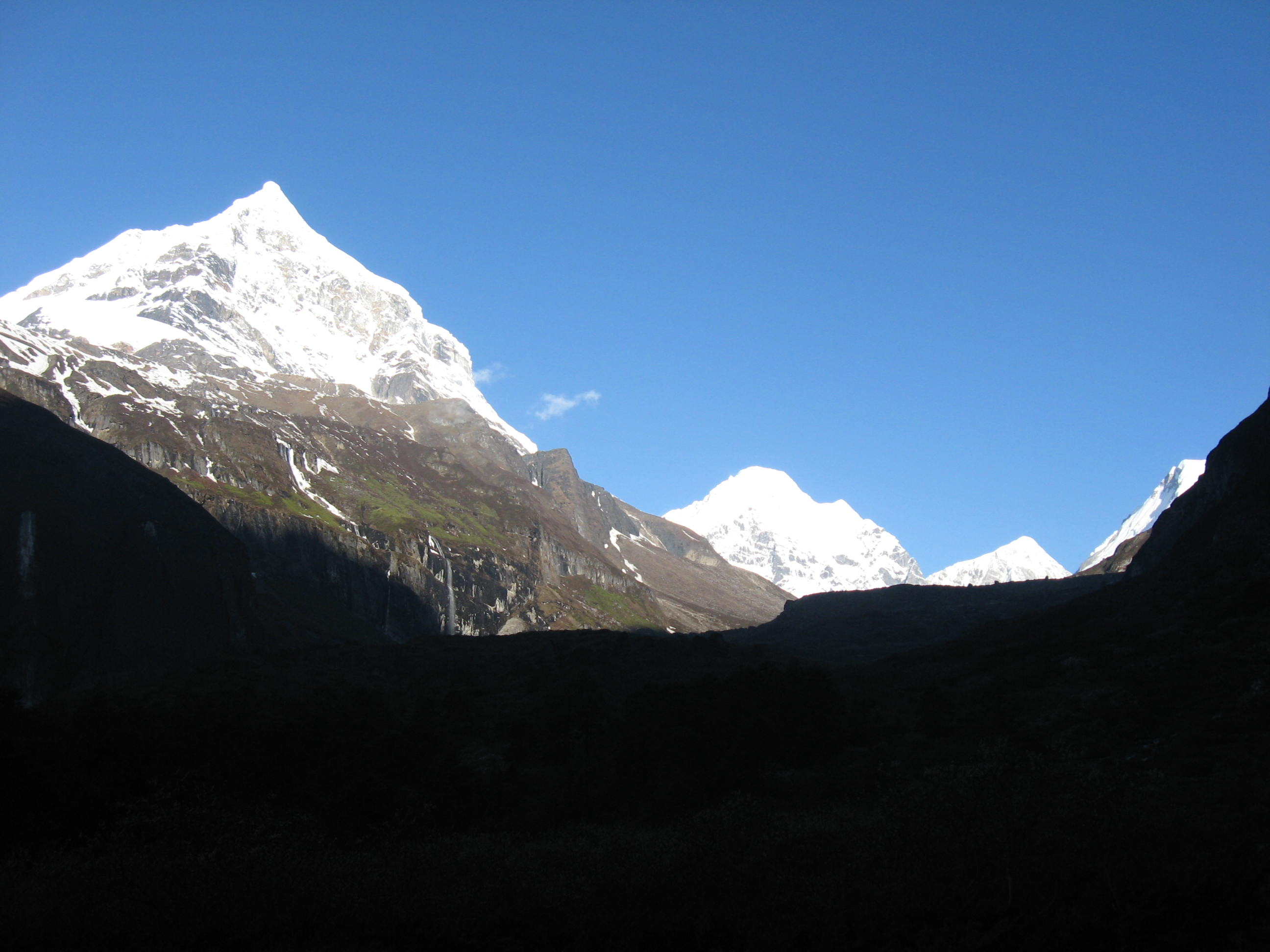
Tutse to left, from northeast

== See also ==
- Geology of the Himalayas
