= Arun River (China–Nepal) =

River in China and Nepal

Arun अरुण नदी
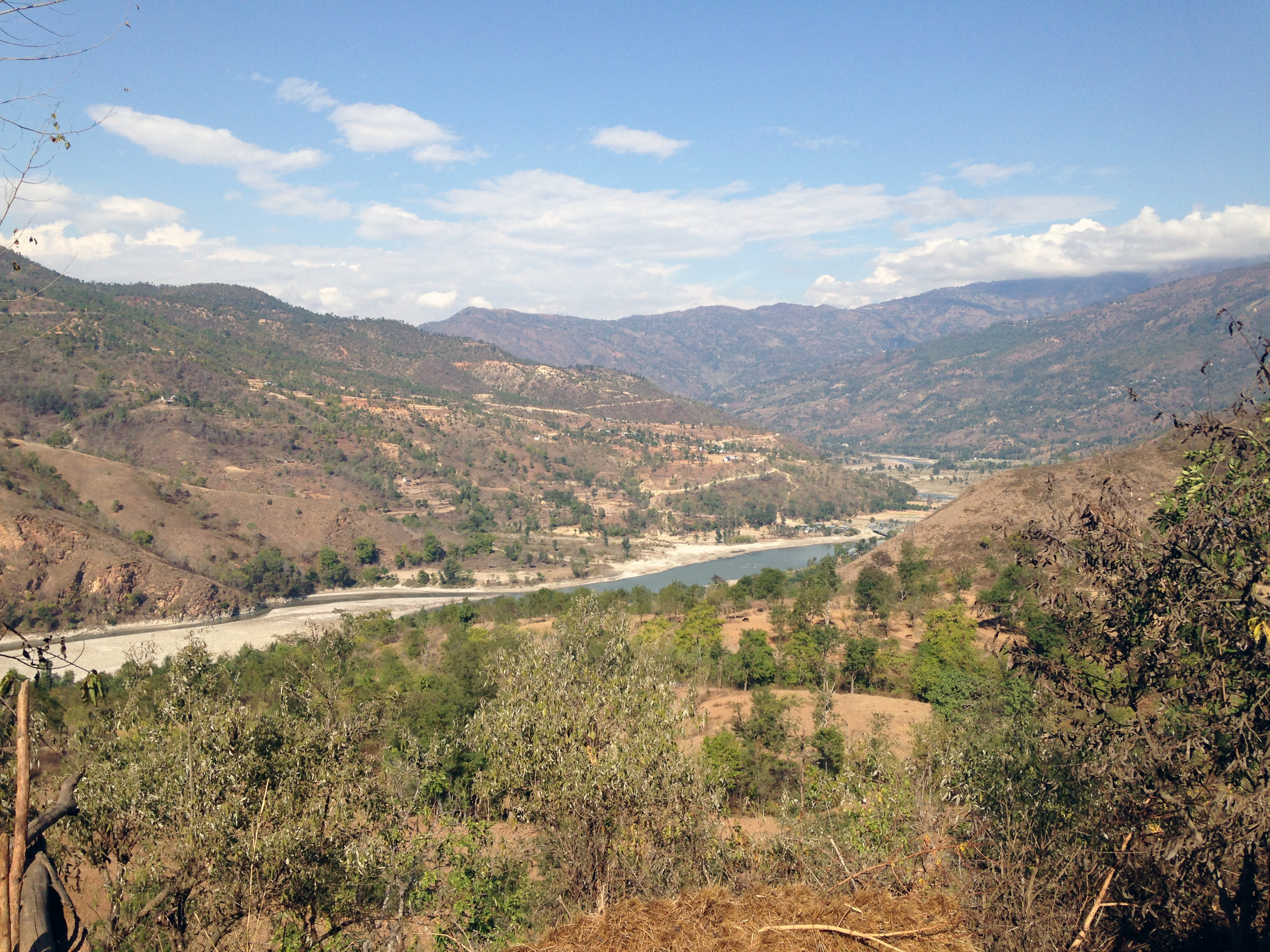
- View of Arun River from Leguwa VDC of Nepal.

- Location of mouth in Nepal
- Native name: Bum-chu (Standard Tibetan)

Location
- Country: Nepal, China
- State: Tibet

Physical characteristics
- Source: Gutso
  - location: Tibet
- Mouth: Confluence with Sun Koshi and Tamur River to form Sapta Koshi
  - location: Tribenighat, Nepal
  - coordinates: 26°54′57″N 87°09′21″E
- Discharge
  - location: Koshi river

Basin features
- Tributaries
  - left: Yeru Tsanpo, Trakar-chu
  - right: Barun River

The Arun River (Nepali: अरुण नदी) is a trans-boundary river that is part of the Koshi or Sapta Koshi river system in Nepal. It originates in the Tibet Autonomous Region of the People's Republic of China where it is called the Phung Chu or Bum-chu.

== Name ==
In Tibet, the river is called Bum-chu, also transliterated Phung-Chu or from Chinese as Peng Qu or Pumqu. The Men Qu or Moinqu is an upper tributary draining glaciers from Shishapangma. In Nepal, the river's name changes to Arun.

== Tibet ==
The Tibetan name Bum-chu may refer to a religious ceremony attempting to divine prospects for the coming year from the level of water in a pot or well, chu is the Tibetan word for water. The river originates near Gutso in Nyalam County of Tibet. Around 17 kilometres (11 mi) downstream, the Men-chu joins it. The Tingri county occupies the upper reaches of the Bum-chu and the lateral valleys formed by its tributaries, the foremost of which are Lolo-chu, Shel-chu, Rongpu-chu, Trakar-chu, Kharda-chu, Ra-chu Tsangpo, and Langkor Gya-chu. The Yeru Tsanpo converges with Bum-chu in Tingkye County, which accommodates the lower Bum-chu valley. Another river that meets Bum-chu is Trakar-chu. The river flows past the town of Kharda, gateway to the Khangzhung east face of Mount Everest. The force of its accumulated waters carves its way, south of Drengtrang, through the main chain of the Himalayas directly between the mountain massifs of Makalu and Kangchenjunga into Nepal. Since the river's elevation is about 3,500 metres (11,500 ft) at the border, while Makalu and Kangchenjunga are both about 8,500 metres (27,900 ft), the valley is some 5,000 metres (16,000 ft) deep, one of the world's deepest.

== Koshi River System ==
The Koshi or Sapta Koshi drains eastern Nepal. It is known as Sapta Koshi because of the seven rivers which join in east-central Nepal to form this river. The main rivers forming the Koshi system are – the Sun Koshi, the Indravati River, the Bhoté Koshi, the Dudh Koshi, the Arun River, Barun River, and Tamur River. The combined river flows through the Chatra Gorge in a southerly direction to emerge from the hills.

The Sun Koshi contributes 44 per cent of the total water in the Sapta Koshi, the Arun 37 per cent and the Tamur 19 per cent.

== Nepal ==
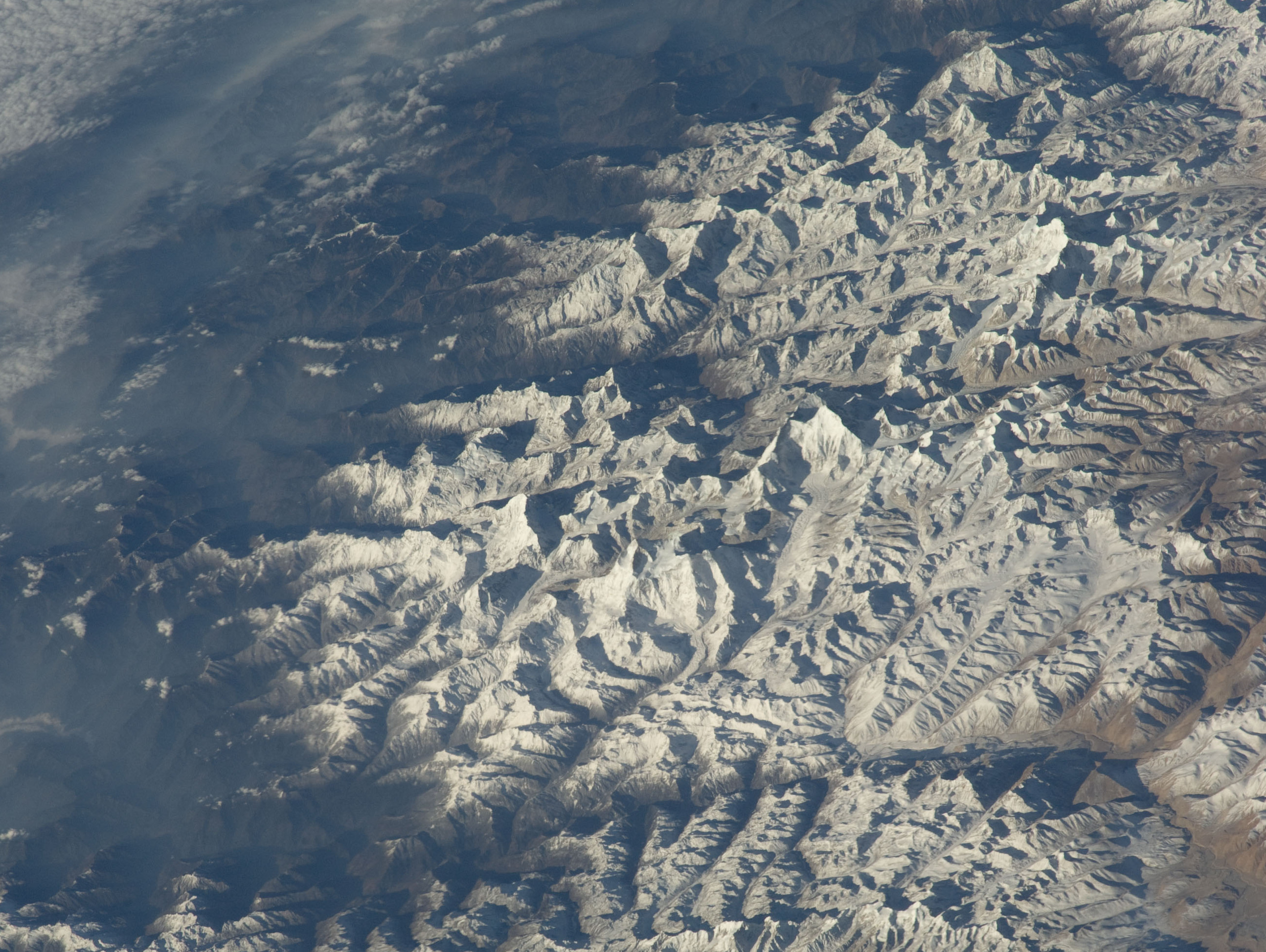
Arun River - Bum Chu valley, Nepal is left in photo, Tibet in North, Umbak Himal peaks in foreground, a view to Chomo Lonzo and Mount Everest East Face (middle)

The Arun is the largest trans-Himalayan river passing through Nepal and also has the greatest snow and ice-covered area of any Nepalese river basin. The Arun drains more than half of the area contributing to the Sapta Koshi river system but provides only about a quarter of the total discharge. This apparent contradiction is caused by the location of more than 80 percent of the Arun's drainage area in the rain shadow of the Himalayas. Average annual rainfall in Tibet is about 300 millimetres (12 in).

The river leaves the Tibet region at a height of about 3,500 metres (11,500 ft) and crosses the main Himalayan ranges. Leaving their rain shadow, the river's flow increases substantially in the monsoonal climate of east Nepal. The landscape south of the border tends to be steep with less than 15 percent of the area having a sustained slope of less than 15° and is strongly dissected by stream channels. Many of the hill slopes are structurally unstable, and the region is seismically active. The August 1988 Nepal earthquake, with an epicentre around 50 km south of the Arun basin, had a moment magnitude of 6.9 and resulted in more than 100 deaths in the basin alone.

The northern third of the Nepalese portion of the Arun basin supports a rich, though human-modified, forest of mixed hardwoods, Chir pine, fir, and rhododendron at elevations of over 1,000 metres (3,300 ft). The vegetation in the southern two-thirds of the area has been extensively modified for subsistence agriculture. Most of the half million people in the Arun basin live in this southern area between 300 metres (980 ft) and 1,000 metres (3,300 ft) in widely scattered villages near the slopes they farm.
