= Geography of Koshi Province =

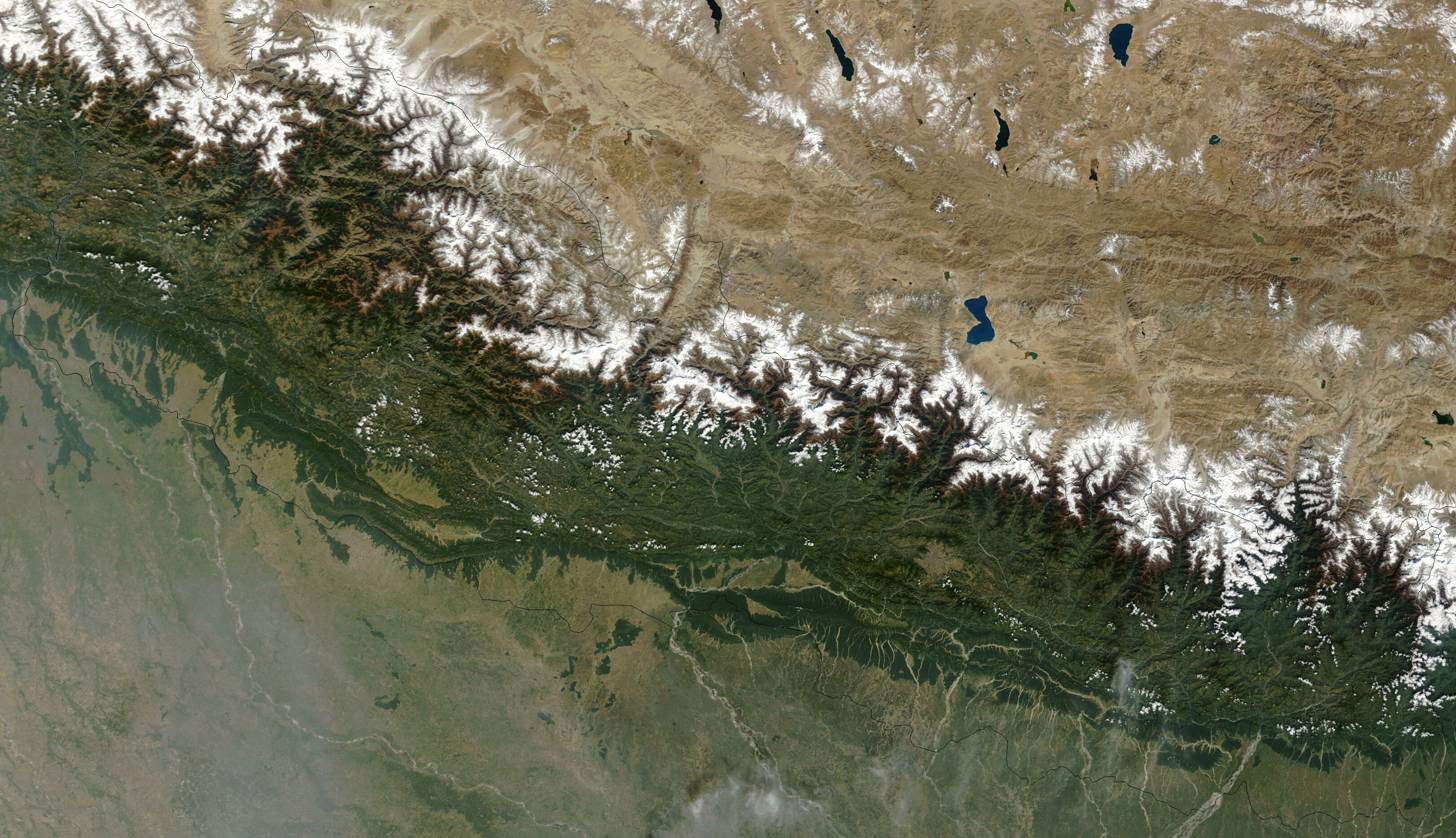
Satellite map of Koshi Province within Nepal

Koshi Province covers an area of 25,905 square kilometres (10,002 sq mi). It is located at easternmost part of Nepal bordering by Tibet Autonomous Region of China in north Bagmati Province in west, Province No. 2 in south-west, Bihar of India in south, North Bengal of India in south-east and Sikkim of India in north-east. Sikkim and part of North Bengal of India forms ethno-linguistic relation with Nepal. Geography of Koshi Province in eastern Nepal is very diverse, of highest peaks of Himalayas in northern extremes to terai region to south. It lies between 86 degree 1 minute and 88 degree 3 minutes east longitude and 28 degree 2 minutes and 26 degree 3 minutes north longitude. Biratnagar, the industrial capital of Nepal, is the temporary capital of this province.t

== Landforms ==
Koshi Province has three folds; northern higher mountains, mid-hills and southern terai. The low land surrounded with hills known as inner-terai.

=== Higher Himalayas region ===
Higher Himalayas are northern parts of the Koshi Province which ranges above 3,000 m (9,800 ft). It consists of sub-alpine and alpine climates. It comprises 3 districts of Koshi Province: Taplejung, Sankhuwasabha and Solukhumbu.

=== Mid-hills region ===
Mid-hills region or lesser Himalayas (Pahad) is a middle region between higher Himalayas and terai of Koshi Province which lies north of terai and south of higher himalayas. It also known as Mahabharat range. The elevation of Mid-hills region ranges from 1,000 and 3,000 m (3,300 and 9,800 ft). This region comprises 8 districts of Koshi Province: Panchthar, Tehrathum, Dhankuta, Bhojpur, Khotang, Okhaldhunga, Ilam and Udayapur.

=== Terai region ===
The southern part of the province has fertile agricultural plain land which is called terai. The elevations of the terai of Koshi Province ranges from 70 and 1,000 m (230 and 3,280 ft). The terai region of Koshi Province comprises 3 districts: Jhapa, Morang and Sunsari.

==== Inner-terai region ====
The plain land area between Shiwalik hills and Mahabharat hills known as inner terai. Udayapur District of Koshi Province has part of Inner terai. Udayapur District's elevation ranges from 360 and 2,310 m (1,180 and 7,580 ft) above sea level, so 360m to 1000m of elevation's area of Udayapur District is Inner terai.
