= Indravati River (disambiguation) =

Indravati River may also refer to:

1. Indravati River, a river in Nepal.
2. Indravati River, a river in India.
