= Kosi River =

River in Tibet, Nepal, and India

Koshi Nepali: कोशी, koshī, Hindi: कोसी, kosī
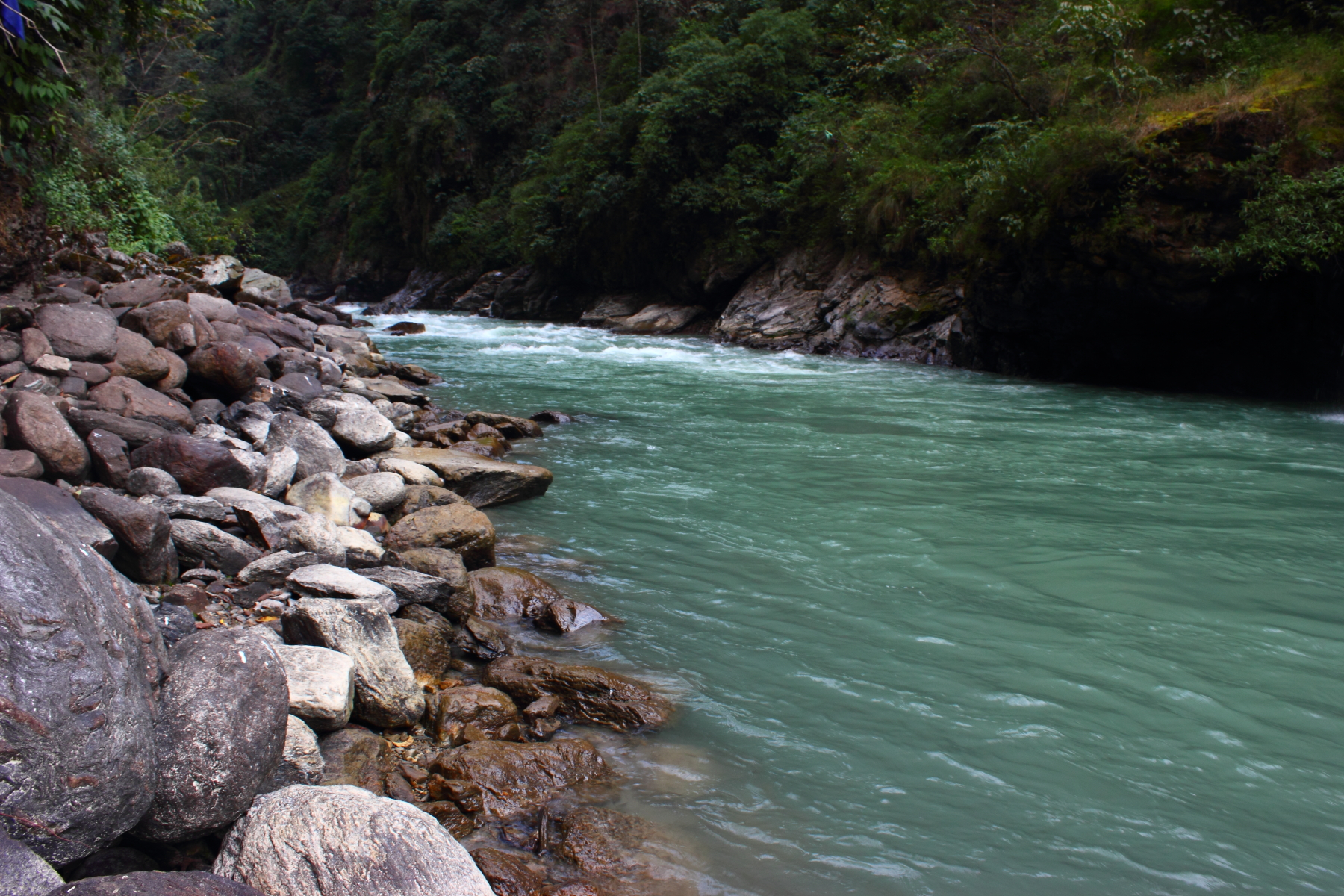
- Kosi River at Kosi Mahasetu, Supaul

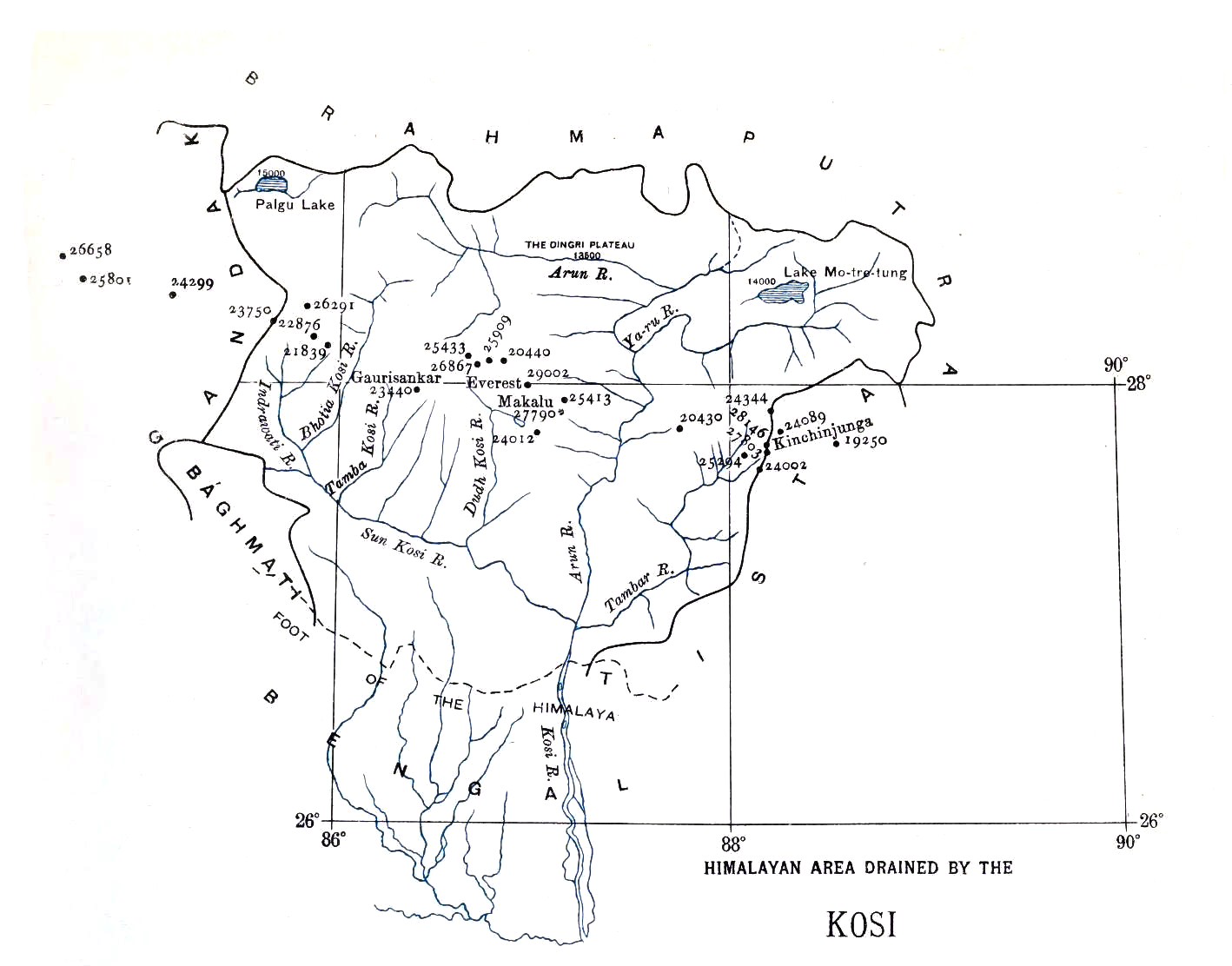
- Map showing Koshi Tributaries

Location
- Country: China, Nepal, India
- State: Tibet Autonomous Region, Koshi province, Bihar
- Cities: Saptari, Sunsari, Supaul, Katihar, Bhagalpur

Physical characteristics
- Source: Sun Kosi, Arun and Tamur Rivers form Saptakoshi
  - location: Triveni, Nepal
- Mouth: Ganges
- Length: 729 km (453 mi)
- Basin size: 74,500 km^{2} (28,800 sq mi)
- Discharge
  - average: 2,500 m^{3}/s (88,000 cu ft/s)

The Kosi or Koshi is a transboundary river which flows through China, Nepal and India. It drains the northern slopes of the Himalayas in Tibet and the southern slopes in Nepal. From a major confluence of tributaries north of the Chatra Gorge onwards, the Kosi River is also known as the Saptakoshi (Nepali: सप्तकोशी, saptakoshī) for its seven upper tributaries. These include the Tamur River originating from the Kanchenjunga area in the east and Arun River and the Sun Kosi from Tibet. The Sun Koshi's tributaries from east to west are the Dudh Koshi, Likhu Khola, Tamakoshi River, Bhote Koshi and Indravati. The Saptakoshi crosses into northern Bihar, India where it branches into distributaries before joining the Ganges near Kursela in Katihar district. The Kosi is the third-largest tributary of the Ganges by water discharge after the Ghaghara and the Yamuna.

The Kosi is 720 km (450 mi) long and drains an area of about 74,500 km^{2} (28,800 sq mi) in Tibet, Nepal and Bihar. In the past, several authors proposed that the river has shifted its course by more than 133 km (83 mi) from east to west during the last 200 years. But a review of 28 historical maps dating 1760 to 1960 revealed a slight eastward shift for a long duration, and that the shift was random and oscillating in nature.

The river basin is surrounded by ridges which separate the Kosi from the Yarlung Tsangpo River in the north, the Gandaki River in the west and the Mahananda River in the east. The river is joined by major tributaries in the Mahabharat Range approximately 48 km (30 mi) north of the Indo-Nepal border. Below the Siwaliks, the river has built up a megafan some 15,000 km^{2} (5,800 sq mi) in extent, breaking into more than 12 distinct channels, all with shifting courses due to flooding. The Kamalā and Bagmati Rivers are the major tributaries of Kosi River in India, besides minor tributaries such as Bhutahi Balān.

Its unstable nature has been attributed to the power it can build up as it passes through the steep and narrow Chatra Gorge in Nepal. During the monsoon season, it picks up a heavy silt load, which it redeposits at times, causing it to change its channel. This leads to flooding in India with extreme effects. Fishing is an important enterprise on the river but fishing resources are being depleted and youth are leaving for other areas of work.

== Geography ==
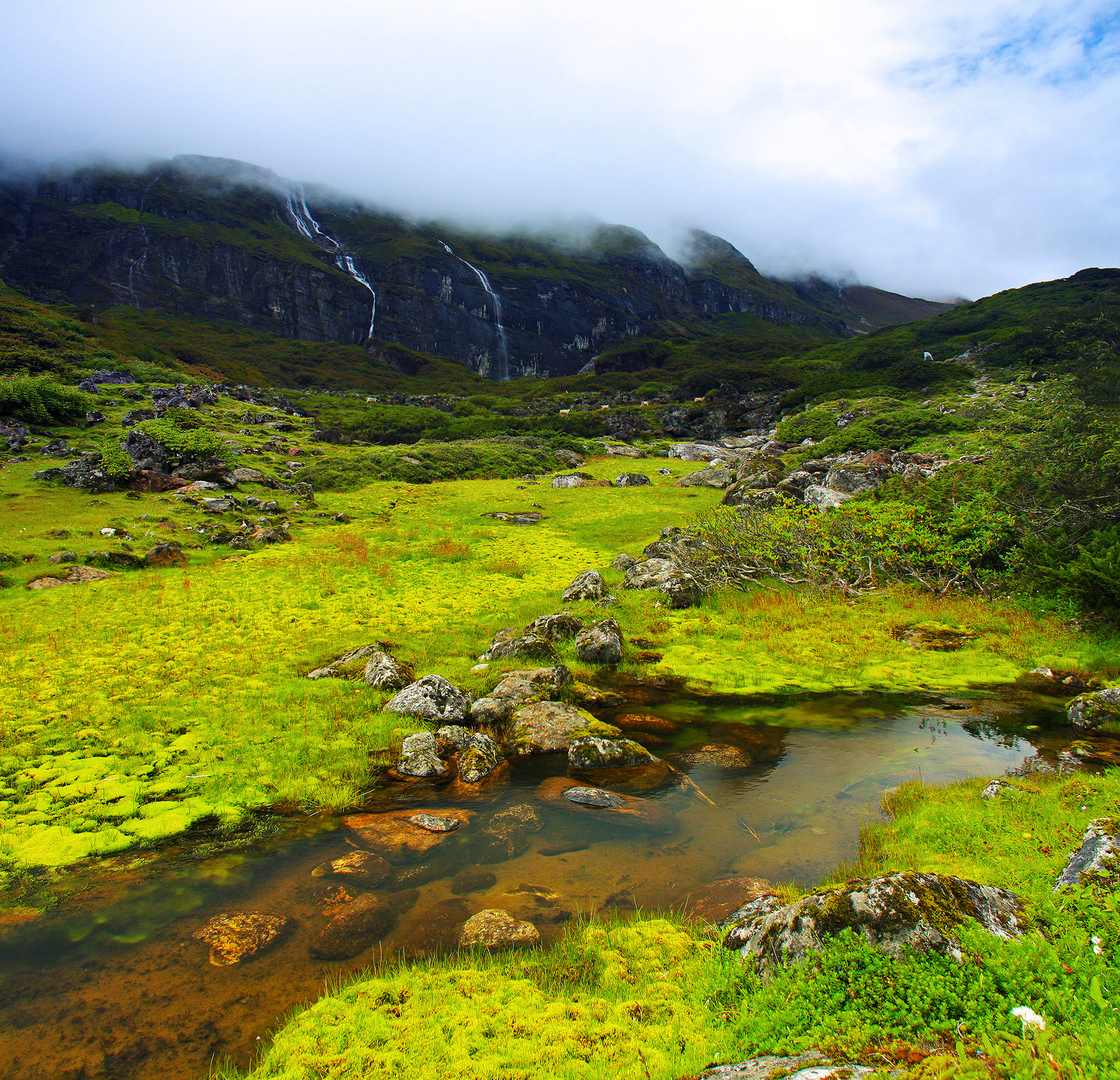
Streams in Barun river valley Nepal – they join and merge into Arun river, another tributary of Koshi river

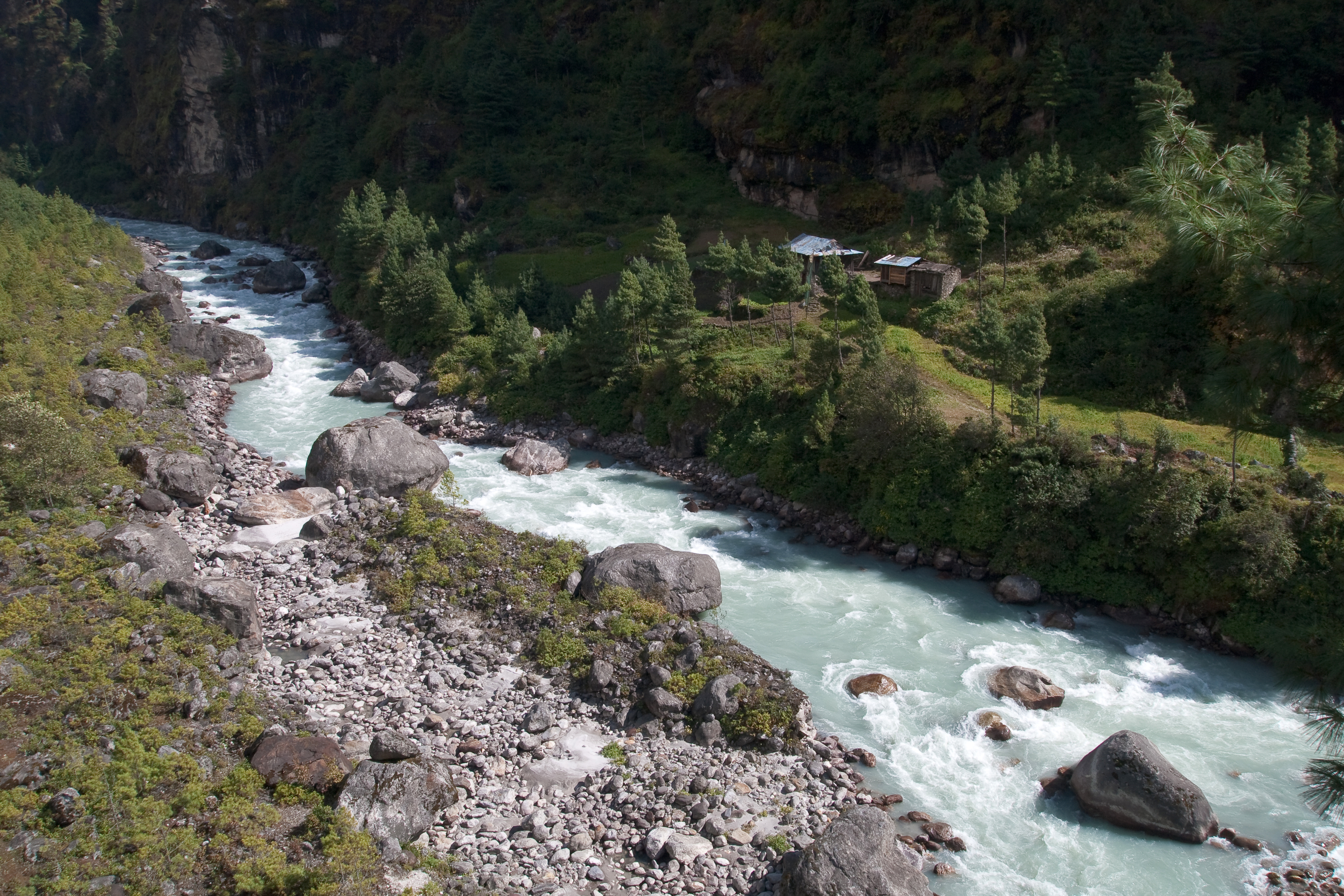
Dudh Koshi, one of the seven Himalayan tributaries of Kosi River

The Kosi River catchment covers six geological and climatic belts varying in altitude from above 8,000 m (26,000 ft) to 95 m (312 ft) comprising the Tibetan Plateau, the Himalayas, the Himalayan mid-hill belt, the Mahabharat Range, the Siwalik Hills and the Terai. The Dudh-Koshi sub-basin alone consists of 36 glaciers and 296 glacier lakes. The Kosi River basin borders the Tsangpo River basin in the north, the Mahananda River basin in the east, the Ganges Basin in the south and the Gandaki River basin in the west. The eight tributaries of the basin upstream the Chatra Gorge include from east to west:

- Tamur River with an area of 6,053 km^{2} (2,337 sq mi) in eastern Nepal;
- Arun River with an area of 33,500 km^{2} (12,900 sq mi), most of which is in Tibet;
- Sun Kosi with an area of 4,285 km^{2} (1,654 sq mi) in Nepal and its northern tributaries Dudh Kosi, Likhu Khola, Tama Koshi, Bhote Koshi and Indravati.

The three major tributaries meet at Triveni, from where they are called Sapta Koshi meaning Seven Rivers. After flowing through the Chatra Gorge the Sapta Koshi is controlled by the Koshi Barrage before it drains into the Gangetic plain.

The reason for such a large, deep gorge is that the river is antecedent to the Himalayas, meaning that it had existed before them and has entrenched itself since they started rising.

Peaks located in the basin include Mount Everest, Kangchenjunga, Lhotse, Makalu, Cho Oyu and Shishapangma. The Bagmati river sub-basin forms the south-western portion of the overall Kosi basin.

The Kosi alluvial fan is one of the largest in the world. It shows evidence of lateral channel shifting exceeding 120 km (75 mi) during the past 250 years, via at least twelve major channels. The river, which flowed near Purnea in the 18th century, now flows west of Saharsa. A satellite image shows old channels with a confluence before 1731 with the Mahananda River north of Lava.

== Floods ==
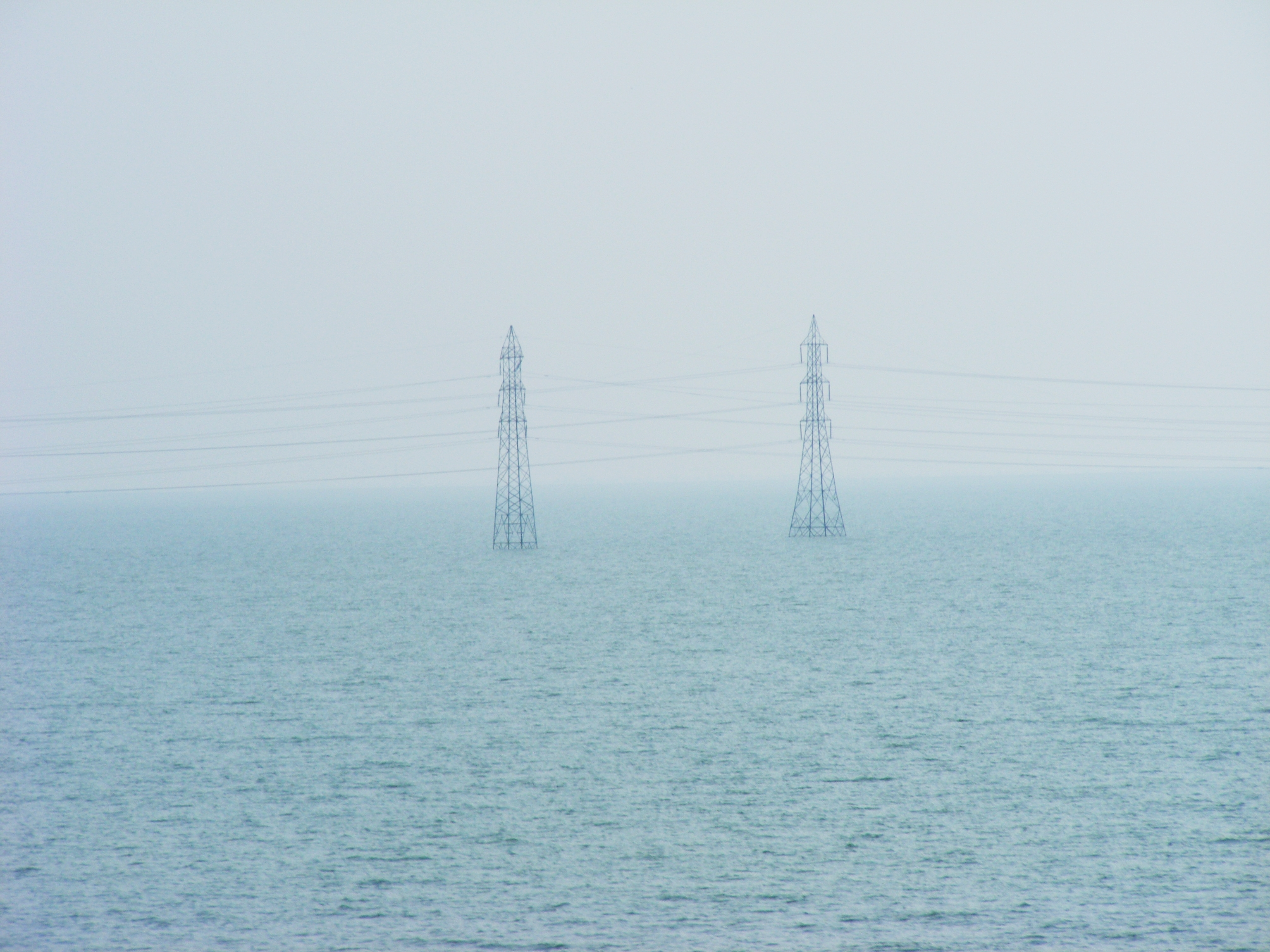
Flooded north Bihar, India

The Kosi River is known as the "Sorrow of Bihar" as the annual floods affect about 21,000 km^{2} (8,100 sq mi) of fertile agricultural lands thereby disturbing the rural economy. It has an average water flow (discharge) of 2,166 cubic metres per second (76,500 cu ft/s).

=== 2008 flood in Bihar ===
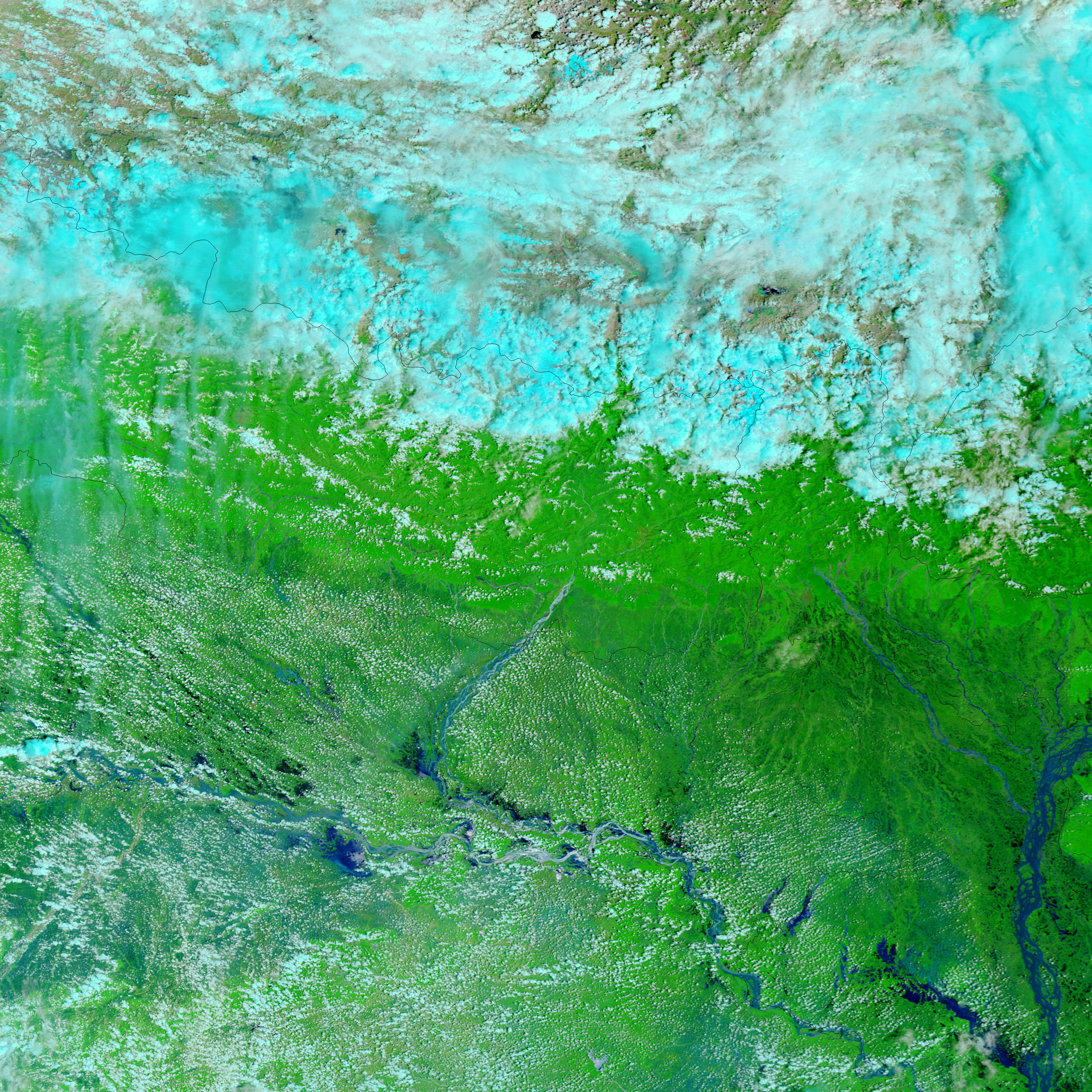
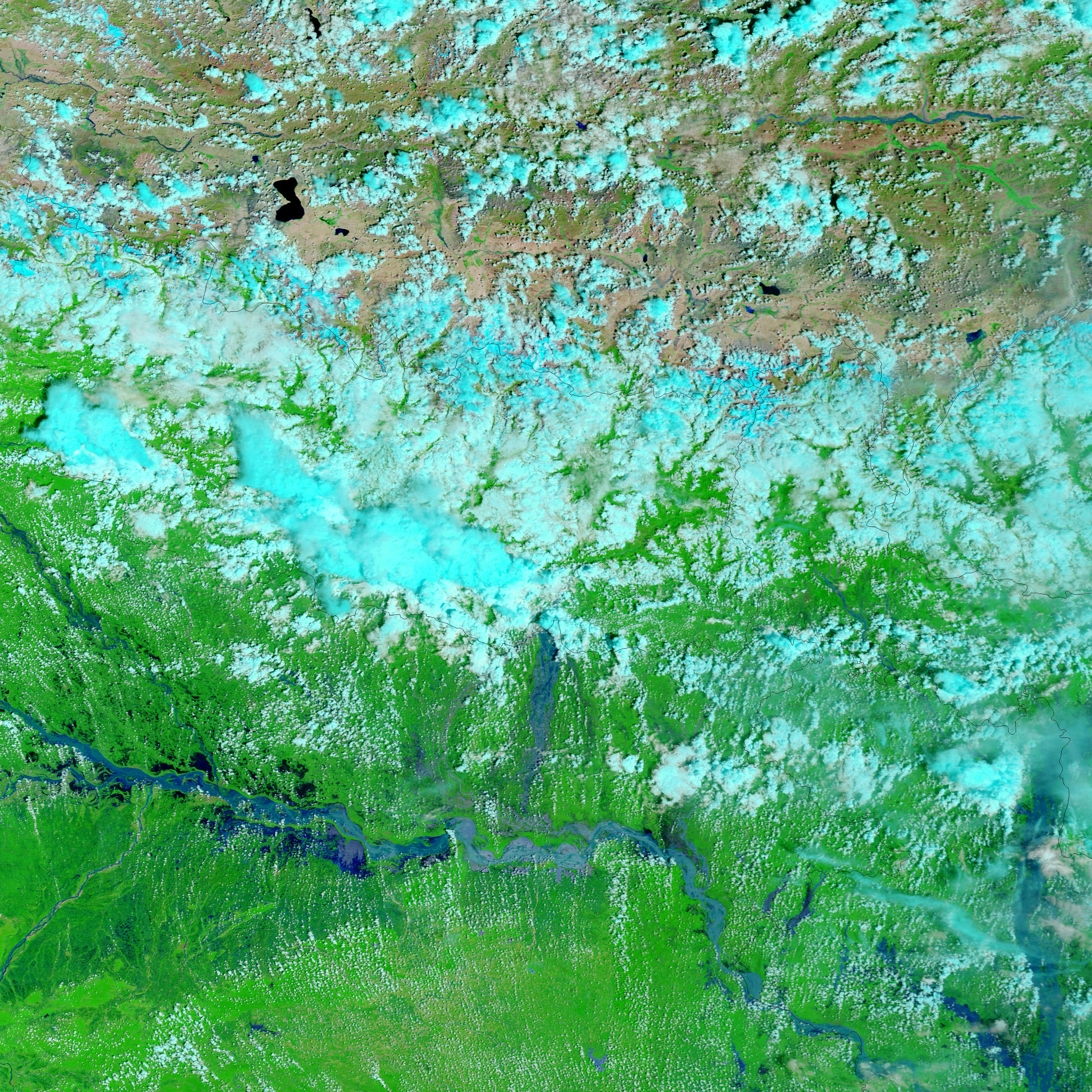
Kosi before flood (upper image), and flooded in August 2008. Courtesy: NASA Satellites (USA).

On 18 August 2008, the Kosi River picked up an old channel it had abandoned over 100 years previously near the border with Nepal and India. Approximately 2.7 million people were affected as the river broke its embankment at Kusaha in Nepal, submerging several districts of Nepal and India. 95% of the Kosi's water flowed through the new course. The worst affected districts included Supaul, Araria, Saharsa, Madhepura, Purnia, Katihar, parts of Khagaria and northern parts of Bhagalpur, as well as adjoining regions of Nepal. Relief work was carried out with Indian Air Force helicopters by dropping relief materials from Purnia in the worst hit districts where nearly two million persons were trapped. The magnitude of deaths or destruction were hard to estimate, as the affected areas were inaccessible. 150 people were reported washed away in a single incident. Another news item stated that 42 people had died.

The Government of Bihar convened a technical committee, headed by a retired engineer-in-chief of the water resource department to supervise the restoration work and close the breach in the East Kosi afflux embankment. Indian authorities worked to prevent widening of the breach, and channels were to be dug to direct the water back to the main river bed.

The fury of the Kosi River left at least 2.5 million people marooned in eight districts and inundated 400 sq mi (1,000 km^{2}). The prime Minister of India declared it a national calamity. The Indian Army, National Disaster Response Force (NDRF) and non-government organizations operated the biggest flood rescue operation in India in more than 50 years.

== Kosi Project ==
The National Flood Control Policy in 1954 (following the disastrous floods of 1954 in a large part of the Kosi river basin) planned to control floods through a series of dams, embankments and river training works. The Kosi project, a bilateral initiative between India and Nepal, was thus conceptualized (based on investigations between 1946 and 1955), in three continuous interlinked stages

- Firstly, a barrage will be built at Bhimnagar to anchor the river that had migrated about 120 km (75 mi) westward in the last 250 years laying waste to a huge tract in north Bihar and to provide irrigation and power benefits to Nepal and India.
- Secondly, embankments will be built both below and above the barrage to hold the river within the defined channel.
- Thirdly, a high multipurpose dam was envisaged within Nepal at Barakshetra to provide a substantial flood cushion along with large irrigation and power benefits to both countries.

This was followed by the Kosi Agreement between Nepal and India signed on 25 April 1954 and revised on 19 December 1966 to address Nepal's concerns. Further letters of Exchange to the Agreement between the two countries identified additional schemes for providing benefits of irrigation. While the first two parts of the plan were implemented by the Government of India, the Kosi High dam, the linchpin of the whole plan, for various political reasons has yet precluded any action for several years but has since been revived under a fresh agreement, in a modified form for further investigations and studies.

=== Kosi barrage ===
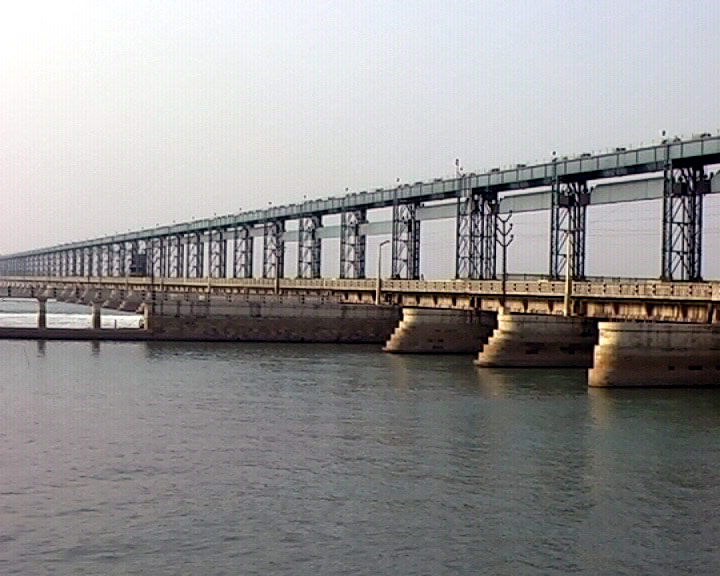
Koshi Barrage

Kosi Barrage, also called Bhimnagar Barrage, was built between 1959 and 1963 and straddles the Indo-Nepal border. It is an irrigation, flood control and hydropower generation project on the Kosi River built under a bilateral agreement between Nepal and India: the entire cost of the project was borne by India. The catchment area of the river is 61,788 km^{2} (23,856 sq mi) in Nepal at the barrage site. The highest peaks lie in its catchment. About 10% is snow-fed. The Eastern Canal and the Western Canal taking off from the barrage, were designed for a discharge capacity of 455 cubic metres per second (16,100 cu ft/s) to irrigate 6,125 square kilometres (1,514,000 acres) and 210 cubic metres per second (7,400 cu ft/s) to irrigate 3,566.1 square kilometres (881,200 acres), respectively. A hydropower plant has been built on the Eastern Canal, at a canal drop (3.6 km (2.2 mi) from the Kosi Barrage), to generate 20 MW. The Western Koshi Canal provides irrigation to 250 square kilometres (62,000 acres) in Nepal. A valuable bridge over the barrage opened up the east–west highway in the eastern sector of Nepal.

An inundation canal taking off at Chatra, where the Kosi River debouches into the plains, has been built to irrigate a gross area of 860 km^{2} in Nepal. The project was renovated with IDA assistance after Nepal took over the project in 1976.

=== Kosi embankment system ===
Silt deposition near Kosi embankment at Navbhata, Saharsa, Bihar, India

The Koshi barrage, with earth dams across the river, as well as afflux bunds and embankments above and below the river, confines the river to flow within embankments. Embankments on both sides downstream of the barrage with a length of 246 km (153 mi) were constructed to check the westward movement of the river. The embankments have been kept far apart, about 12 to 16 km (9.9 mi), to serve as a silt trap.

=== Sapta Koshi High Multipurpose Project (Indo-Nepal) ===
The governments of India and Nepal agreed to conduct joint investigations and other studies for the preparation of a detailed project report of Sapta Koshi High Dam Multipurpose Project and Sun Koshi Storage-cum-Diversion Scheme to meet the objectives of both countries for development of hydropower, irrigation, flood control and management and navigation. As currently outlined, the dam would displace approximately 10,000 people.

Envisaged are a 269-meter (883 ft) high concrete or rock-filled dam, a barrage, and two canals. The dam is on the Sapta Koshi River with an underground powerhouse, producing 3,000 MW at 50% load factor. The barrage is planned for the Sapta Koshi about 8 km (5.0 mi) downstream of Sapta Koshi High Dam to re-regulate the diverted water. The Eastern Chhatra Canal and Western Chhatra Canal, off-take from the barrage site to provide water for irrigation both in Nepal and India and navigation through Koshi up to Kursela and also in the reservoir of Sapta Koshi dam.

A power canal existing Kosi barrage at Hanuman Nagar is proposed for conveying water for irrigation from the Eastern Chatra Canal and also water that may be required downstream for navigation. To utilize the head available between Chatra and Hanuman Nagar barrages for power generation, three canal power houses, each of 100 MW installed capacity are proposed on the power canal.

Extra storage capacity of Sapta Koshi High Dam would be provided to moderate downstream flooding. Chatra Canal System would provide irrigation to large areas in Nepal and India, particularly in Bihar. A Joint Project Office (JPO) has been set up in Nepal for investigation of the project.

== Hydropower ==
Nepal has a total estimated potential of 83,290 MW with economically exploitable potential of 42,140 MW. The Kosi River basin contributes 22,350 MW of this potential including 360 MW from small schemes and 18750 MW from major schemes. The economically exploitable potential is assessed as 10,860 MW (includes the Sapta Koshi Multipurpose Project [3300MW] mentioned above).

== Protected areas ==
In Nepal two protected areas are located in the Koshi River basin.

=== Sagarmatha National Park ===
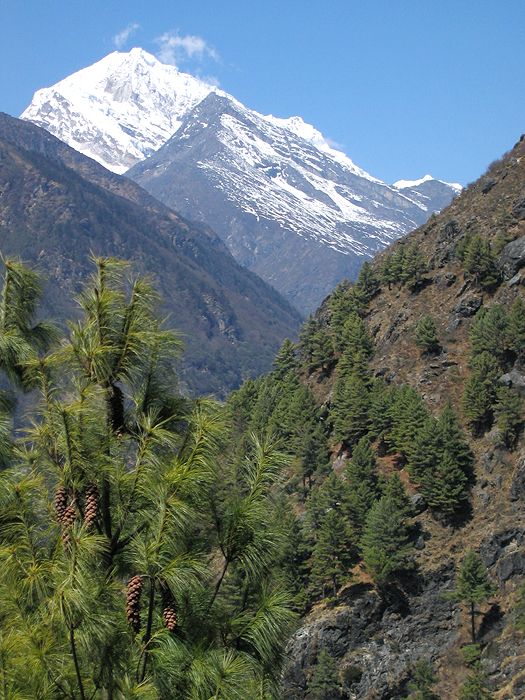
Pinus wallichiana in Sagarmatha National Park

The Sagarmatha National Park encompasses the upper catchments of the Dudh Koshi River system. The park covers an area of 1,148 km^{2} (443 sq mi) and ranges in elevation from 2,845 m (9,334 ft) to 8,848 m (29,029 ft) at the summit of Mount Everest. Established in 1976 the park was declared a UNESCO World Heritage Site in 1979. The landscape in the park is rugged consisting of mountain peaks, glaciers, rivers, lakes, forests, alpine scrubs and meadows. The forests comprise stands of oak, blue pine, fir, birch, juniper and rhododendron. The park provides habitat for snow leopards, red pandas, musk deer, Himalayan tahrs, and 208 bird species including impeyan pheasant, bearded vulture, snow cock, and the yellow-billed chough.

About 3500 Sherpa people live in villages and seasonal settlements situated along the main tourist trails. Tourism to the region began in the early 1960s. In 2003, about 19,000 tourists arrived in the area.

=== Koshi Tappu Wildlife Reserve ===
The Koshi Tappu Wildlife Reserve is situated in the flood plains of the Saptkoshi River in the eastern Terai. It covers an area of 175 km^{2} (68 sq mi) comprising grasslands and khair–sissoo riverine forests. It was established in 1976 and was declared a Ramsar site in 1987. The reserve provides habitat for hog deer, spotted deer, wild boar, blue bull, gaur, smooth-coated otter, jackal, 485 bird species including 114 water bird species, 200 fish species, 24 reptile and 11 amphibian species. The last surviving population of wild water buffalo in Nepal is found in the reserve, as well as Gangetic dolphin, swamp francolin and rufous-vented prinia. A small population of the critically endangered Bengal florican is present along the Koshi River. There are also records of white-throated bush chat and Finn's weaver. The bristled grassbird breeds in the reserve. The reserve together with the Koshi Barrage was identified as one of 27 Important Bird Areas of Nepal.

== List of Cities and towns ==
Here is the list of Cities and Towns at the bank of this River.

- Baraha Kshetra
- Birpur, Supaul
- Nirmali
- Supaul
- Kursela

== See also ==
- List of rivers of India
- List of rivers of Nepal
- Kolasi
- Katihar
- Dharmamoola
