= Likhu Khola =

Liku (Likhu) Himganga, Sanokoshi
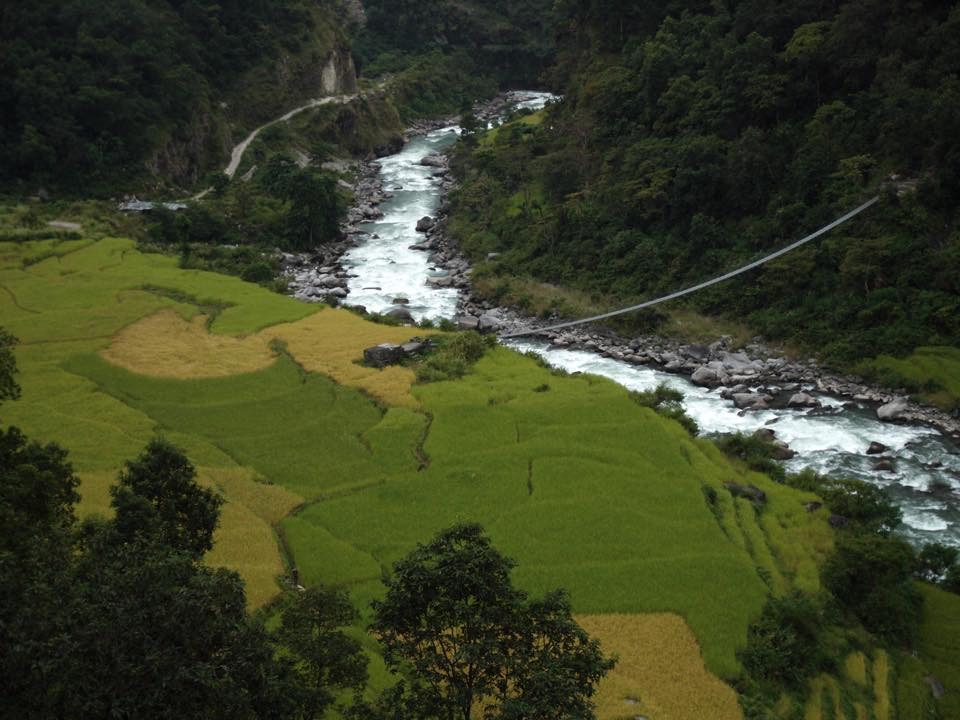
- Liku (Likhu) Serse

- Location in Nepal

Location
- Country: Nepal

Physical characteristics
- Source: Glacier Zurmoche, Sun Kosi, Thamakoshi and Tamur, Saptakoshi
  - location: Sagarmatha, Janakpur, Nepal
  - coordinates: 27°45′40″N 86°31′56″E
- Mouth: Confluence with the Sun Koshi
  - coordinates: 27°15′2.8″N 86°12′16.91″E

The Likhu Khola is a left tributary of the Sun Koshi in the Himalayas in eastern Nepal. Named by the Kirat kingdom, Likhu or Liku in the Sunuwar language (Li- top, Hill, Ku-water) means Top (Hill) Water.

The river's headwater is in Zurmoche Glacier on the southern slope of Likhu Chuli. It flows in a south-southwest direction, mainly through the mountains. Th Likhu Khola flows along the border between the administrative regions of Ramechhap in the west and the east Okhaldhunga Sagarmatha. The catchment area of the Likhu Khola is bordered on the west by that of Tamakoshi and on the east by that of Dudh Kosi. The Likhu Khola has a length of about 75 km.
