= Indravati River (Nepal) =

River in Nepal

Indravati River/Indrawati River/ Melamchi Khola
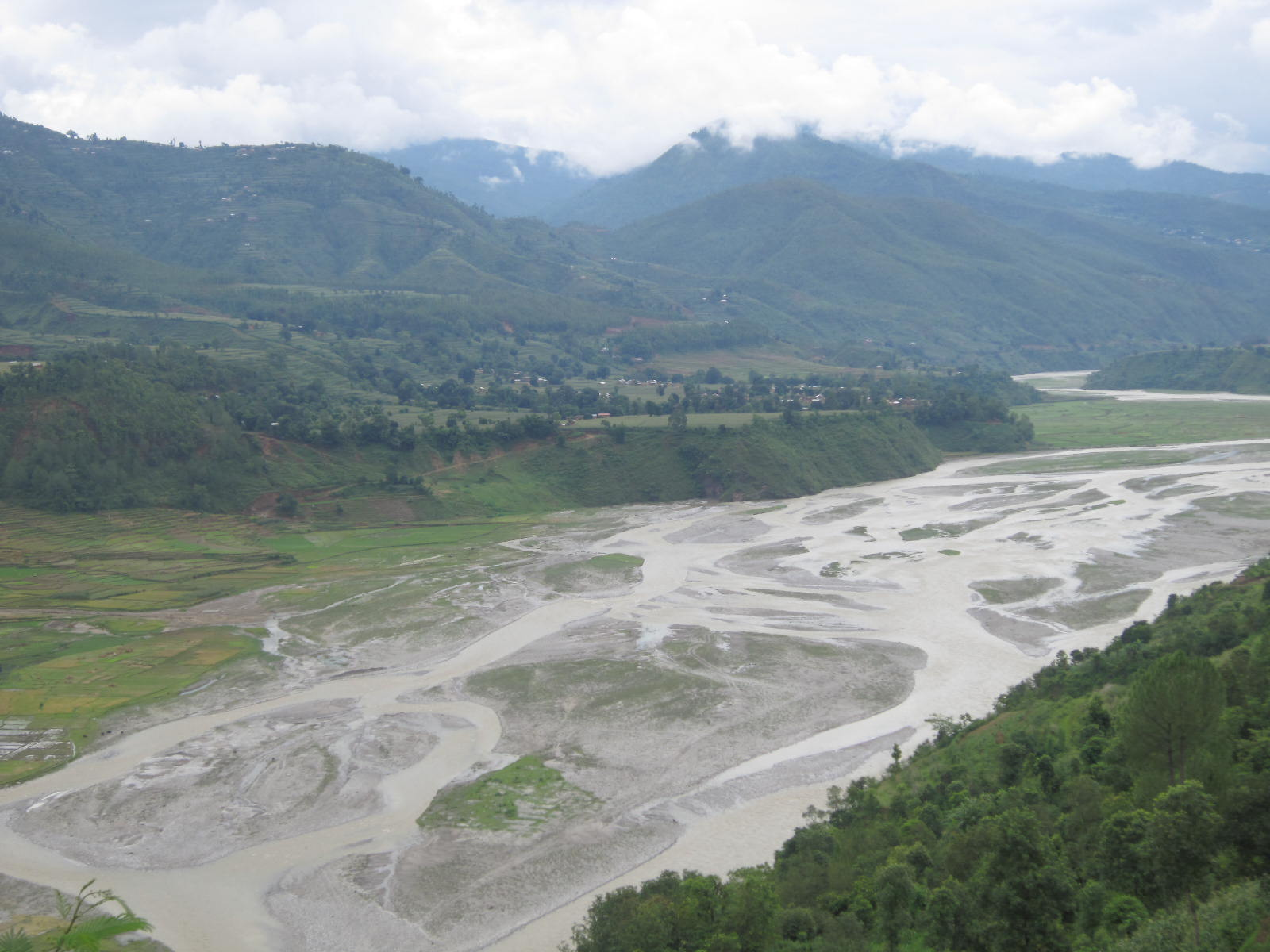
- Indravati River

Location
- Country: Nepal

Physical characteristics
- Source
  - location: Himalayas
- Mouth
  - location: Sun Kosi at Dolalghat
  - coordinates: 27°38′46″N 85°42′14″E

Basin features
- River system: Koshi River

The Indravati River (Nepali: इन्द्रावती नदी) in Nepal is a tributary of the Sun Koshi River. It used to be called "Melamchi" or "Melamchu" until the 19th century.

== Course ==
The source of the Indravati River is located in the south-facing slopes of the Himalayas. Its upper course is characterized by a steep gradient, precipitous slopes, huge boulders and rocks in the river valley, and large rapids. It flows through alpine, sub-alpine and temperate forests. Settlements occur along its lower course. The Indravati's catchment area includes the eastern slopes of the Kathmandu basin and extends to the Indravati – Sun Koshi water divide.

The Indravati meets the Sun Koshi at Dolalghat, located on the Arniko Highway that links Kathmandu with the Nepal-Tibet border.

== Koshi River system ==
The Koshi River drains eastern Nepal. It is also known as the Saptkoshi because of the seven rivers joining in east-central Nepal to form this river. The main rivers forming the Koshi River system are the Sun Koshi, Indravati, Tamma Koshi, Bhote Koshi, Dudh Kosi, Arun and Tamur Rivers. The Saptkoshi River flows through the Chatra Gorge in a southerly direction into northern Bihar in India and joins the Ganges.

== Quake ==
The April 2015 Nepal earthquake rupture began 80 km (50 mi) to the northwest of Kathmandu and propagated eastward for about 130 km (81 mi), rupturing the area directly located under the capital city of Nepal. The rupture ends in the zone of the western fringes of the Indravati river.
