= Melamchi River =

River of Nepal

Coordinates: 27°50′00″N 85°34′38″E

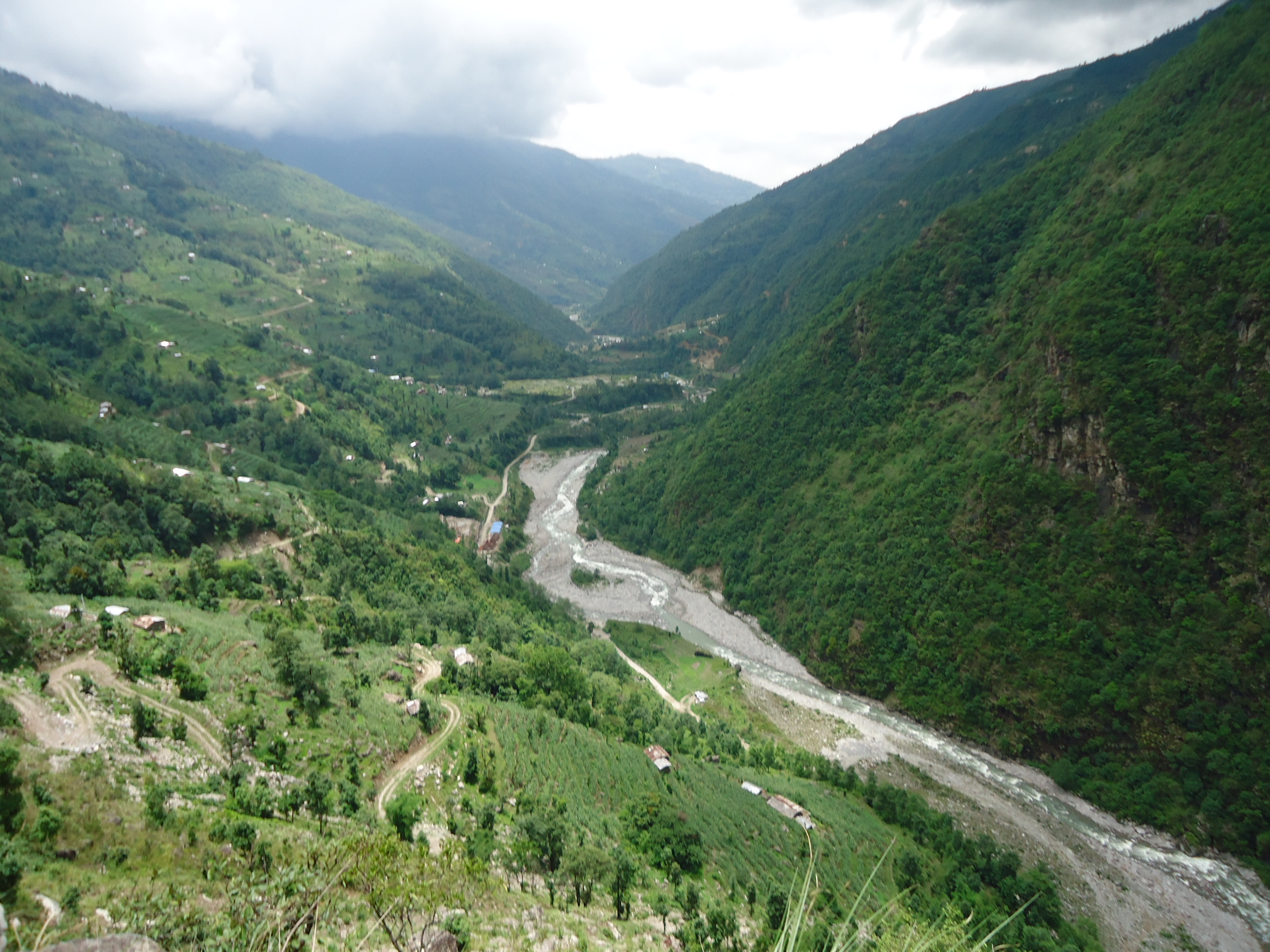
Melamchi river valley

Melamchi River (Nepali: मेलम्चि खोला) is a tributary of the Indrawati River. It originates from the Jugal Himal at an elevation of about 5,875 m (19,275 ft). It joins the Indrawati River at Melamchi Bazaar.

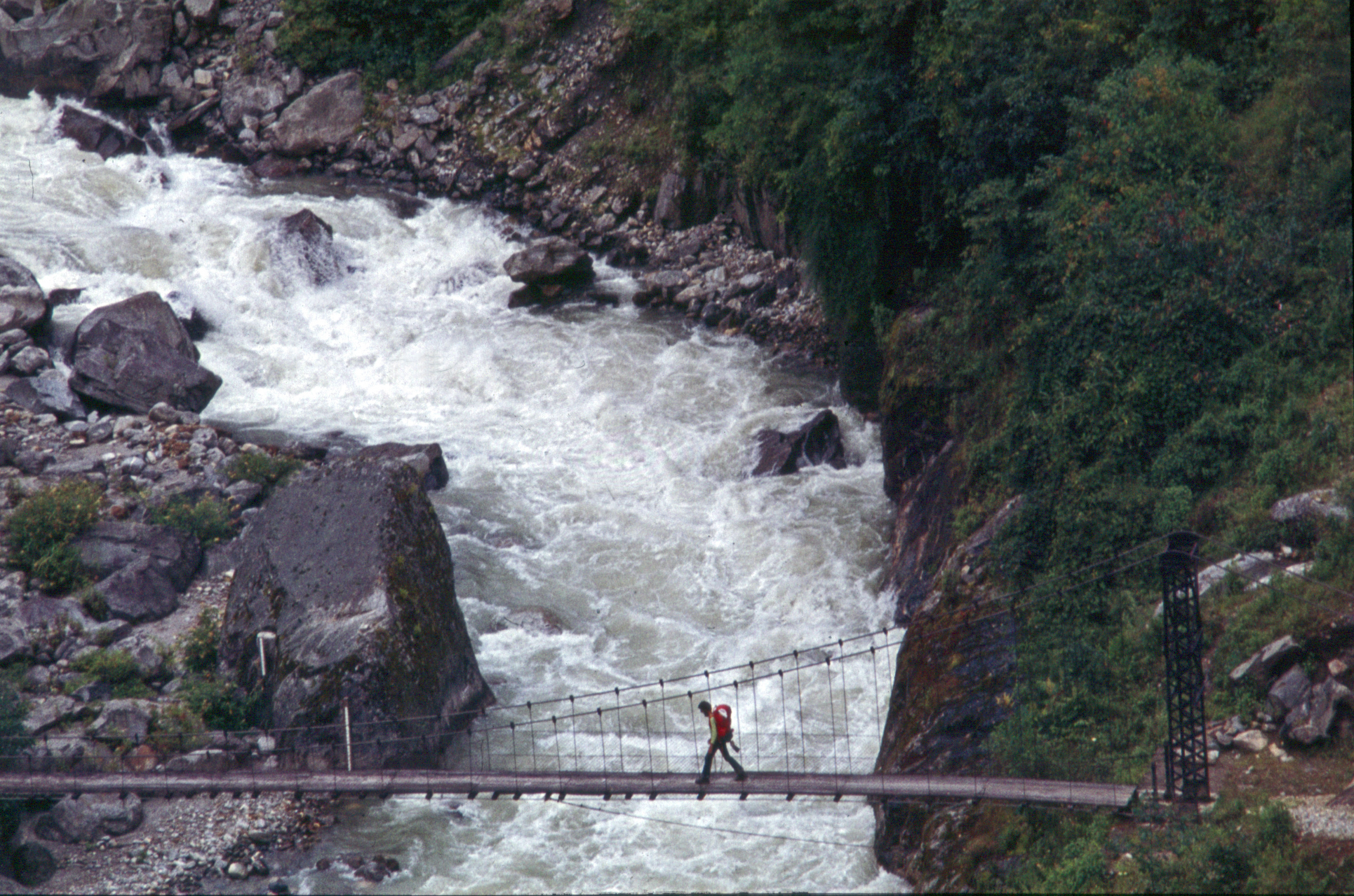
Hiking in Langtang area of Nepal

The Melamchi River is 41 km (25 mi) long and has a catchment area of 330 km^{2} (130 sq mi) up to the confluence. The river flows southwards and widens downstream. Its mean annual flow is 9.7 m^{3}/s. The maximum flow is 289 m^{3}/s. The Melamchi Water Supply Project diverts drinking water from the river to Kathmandu.

In June 2021, a flood in the river damaged the Melamchi Bazaar, killing several locals and some foreigners.

== See also ==
- List of rivers of Nepal
