= Dudh Koshi =

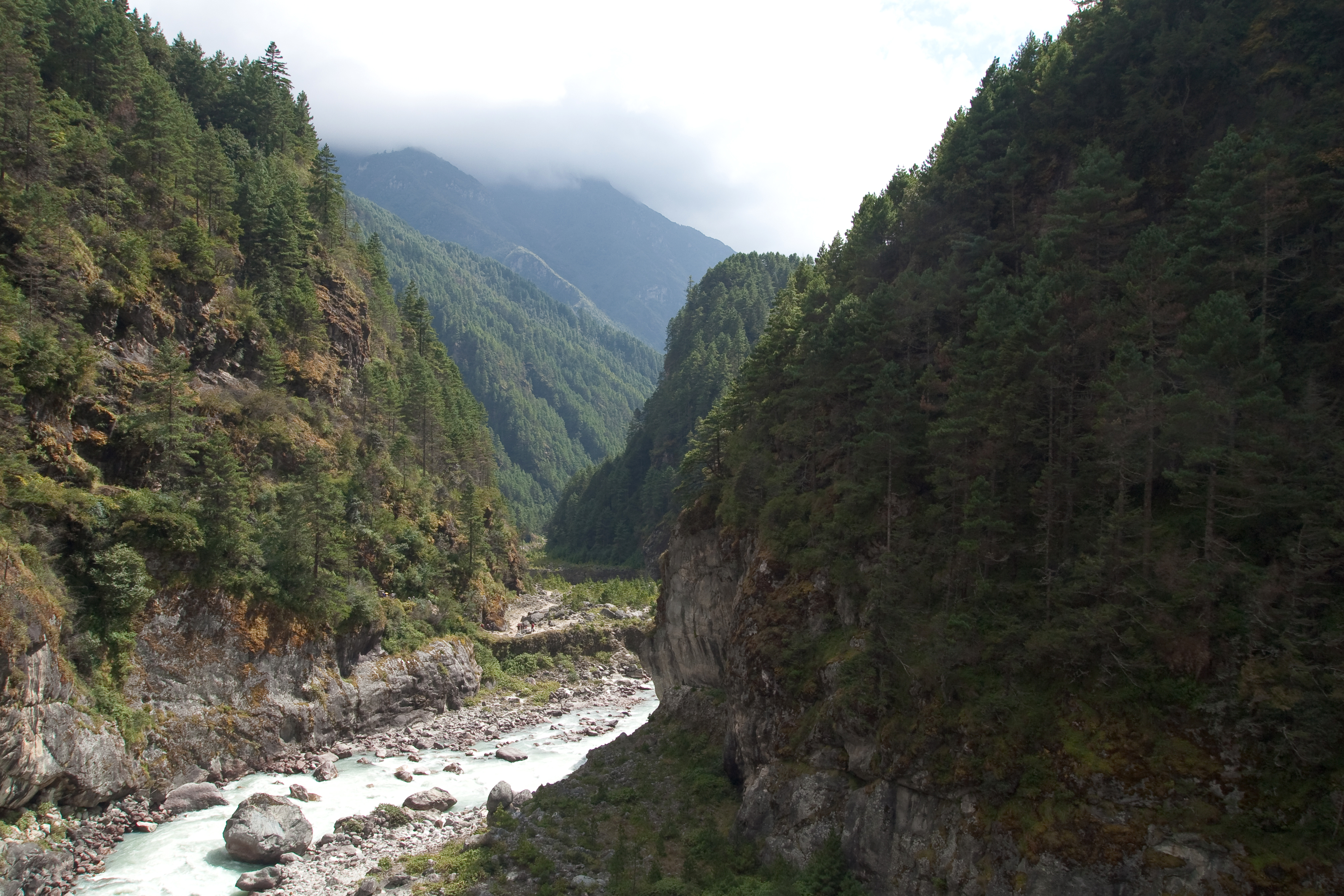

Location
- Country: Nepal

Physical characteristics
- Source
  - location: East of Gokyo Lakes
  - coordinates: 27°56′05″N 86°42′34″E
- Mouth
  - location: Sun Kosi near Harkapur
  - coordinates: 27°08′58″N 86°26′00″E

Basin features
- River system: Koshi River
- Tributaries
  - left: Imja Khola

Dudh Koshi (दुधकोशी नदी, Milk-Koshi River) is a river in eastern Nepal. It is the highest river in terms of elevation. Dudh Koshi originates from the glacier lakes at the height of 5,100 meters above sea level and meets Sapta Koshi at the altitude of 1,245 meters.

== Koshi river system ==
The Kosi River, or Sapt Koshi, drains eastern Nepal. It is known as Sapta Koshi because of the seven rivers which join together in east-central Nepal to form this river. The main rivers forming the Sapta Koshi River system are – the Sun Koshi (सुन कोशी)], the Melamchi River Indravati River (इन्द्रावती), the tama Koshi (तामा कोशी), the Dudh Koshi (दुध कोशी), the Arun River (अरुण), Tamor River (तमोर) and Likhu River. The Dudh Kosi river originates from the high-altitude areas of Mount Everest (8848 metres) and the snow and glacier melt contributes significant portion of streamflow, especially during the dry season. The combined river flows through the Chatra Gorge in a southerly direction to emerge from the hills.

== Course ==
The river drains the Mount Everest massif, the highest peak in the world. It begins just east of Gokyo Lakes and flows south to Namche Bazaar. Continuing south, the Dudh Koshi exits Sagarmatha National Park and passes to the west of Lukla. The Lamding Khola joins the Dudh Koshi to the southwest of Surkya and continues its southerly course to Harkapur, where it joins the Sun Kosi.

== Paddling ==
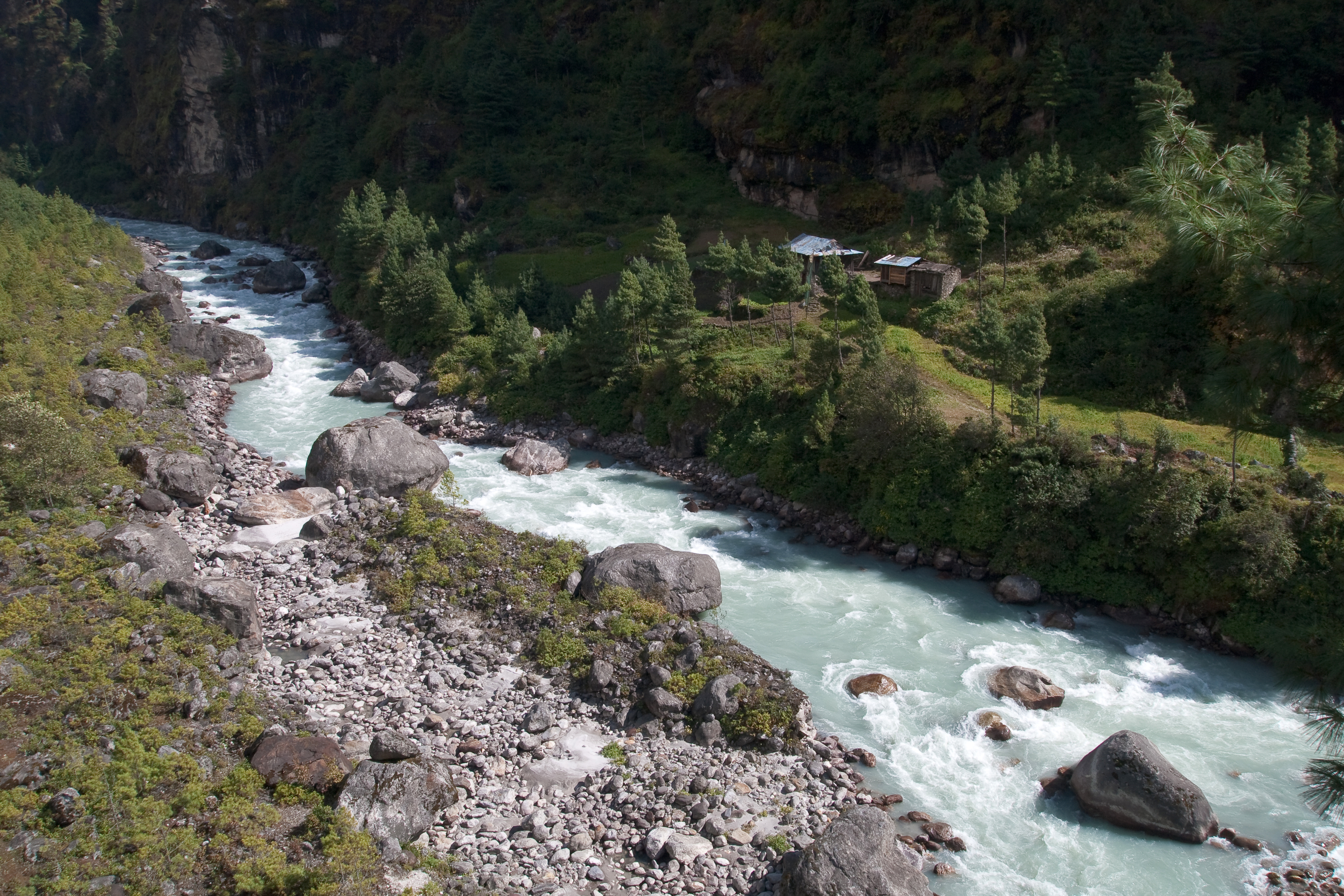

The river is characteristic of extreme white water and normally cannot be used for watersports. The descent is over 5% and there are rapids that reach WW VI difficulty (not yet rated by AWA) and places that need to be portaged even with the best equipment. In addition, the river often changes — big stones getting moved around by natural forces etc.

Flowing down from Mount Everest, the river is believed to be the highest navigable whitewater. As such, it came to the attention of teams participating in the world cup since Austrian paddlers made a world record descending from 3,200 m altitude in France. Czechoslovak sportsmen then agreed to take up the challenge. A team of sixteen men, including fourteen Czechs and two Slovaks, had been gathered and on 4 January 1973 they set on the journey from Děhylov by cars (notably using customized Tatra 138 that had to survive over 30,000 km forth and back). For the last part from Lukla to Pheriche, 110 porters were hired to carry the boats and other equipment. The actual river trip began on 1 April near Pheriche at 4,243 mamsl and ran for 126 km down to Sun Kosi. The paddlers used both covered tandem canoes (C2) of Vertex brand and solo kayaks (K1), all made of fiberglass. The expedition returned home safely in August the same year.

Three years later, in 1976, there was a British expedition of seven kayakers under the leadership of Mike Jones. They used 4 metres long fiberglass slalom-style kayaks specially designed by Pyranha Canoes with extra buoyancy and reinforcement. The expedition is notable for taking place in September to avoid ice and when the water was high to set new altitude record. They paddled at approximately 5300 mamsl on one of the lakes at the Khumbu Glacier. But the high water flow had its downside — many parts were too dangerous and had to be omitted; the result was that just two boats out of eleven survived to the end at the confluence with Sun Kosi. It is unclear which parts of the river were skipped, but the descent is generally considered incomplete. The next year, HTV documentary movie "Dudh Kosi: Relentless River of Everest" was released which is a source of common misconception that this was the first trip on the river.

Note that both expeditions didn't embark on Dudh Kosi but rather on Lobuche which is the river formed by the Khumbu Glacier and which runs around Pheriche. Just below Pheriche it merges with Imja Khola which then runs for about ten kilometres before it joins Dudh Kosi under Tengboche.

Since then, there were many expeditions using wide variety of boat constructions allowing to run some rapids that had to be portaged previously. However the access to upper parts above Lukla is now limited due to stricter regulations in and around national parks.
