= Choukati =

Chaukati चौकटी
- Village development committee
- Location in Nepal
- Coordinates: 27.76°N 85.97°E
- Country: Nepal
- Zone: Bagmati Zone
- District: Sindhupalchok District

Population (1991)
  - Total: 2,346
  - Religions: Hindu
- Time zone: UTC+5:45 (Nepal Time)

Chaukati is a village in Sindhupalchok District in the Bagmati Zone of central Nepal. At the time of the 1991 Nepal census it had a population of 2346 and had 539 houses in the village. By 2011 the population had become 2497 (1334 females and 1163 males) in 627 households.
