= Bhotekoshi River =

River in Nepal

Bhote Koshi / Poiqu
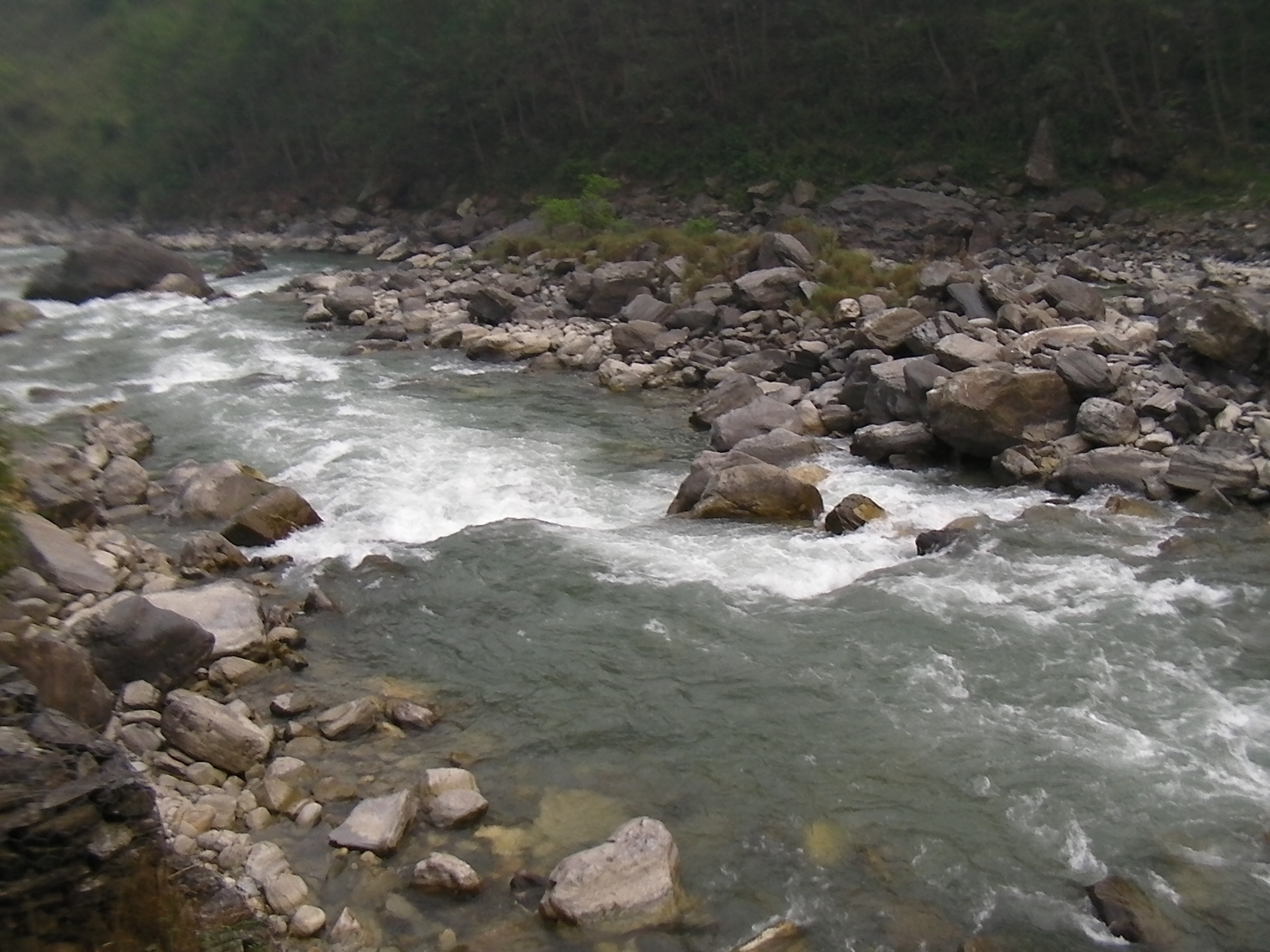
- Bhote Koshi near the Tibetan border during dry season

Physical characteristics
- Source
  - location: Zhangzangbo Glacier, Tibet Autonomous Region
  - elevation: 5,600 m (18,400 ft)
- Mouth
  - location: Sun Kosi near Balephi, Sindhupalchowk, Nepal
  - coordinates: 27°43′58″N 85°46′47″E
  - elevation: 640 m (2,100 ft)

Basin features
- River system: Koshi River

- Poiqu

Tibetan name
- Tibetan: བོད་ཆུ
- Literal meaning: river of Tibet
Transcriptions
- Wylie: bod chu
- THL: bö chu
- Tibetan Pinyin: Poi Qu

Chinese name
- Traditional Chinese: 波曲
Transcriptions
Standard Mandarin
- Hanyu Pinyin: Bō qū

- Matsang Tsangpo

Tibetan name
- Tibetan: མ་གཙང་གཙང་པོ།
Transcriptions
- Wylie: ma gtsang gtsang po
- THL: ma tsang tsang po
- Tibetan Pinyin: Mazang Zangbo

Chinese name
- Traditional Chinese: 麻章藏布
Transcriptions
Standard Mandarin
- Hanyu Pinyin: Mázhāng cángbù

Bhote Kosi
- Traditional Chinese: 波特科西
- Simplified Chinese: 波特科西
Transcriptions
Standard Mandarin
- Hanyu Pinyin: Bōtè Kēxī

Nepali name
- Nepali: भोटे कोशी

Bhote Koshi in Nepal and Poiqu in Tibet (both names roughly mean "Tibetan river") is the name given to the upper course (main tributary) of the Sun Koshi river. It is part of the Koshi River system in Nepal.

== Names and etymology ==
Bhote koshi is the Nepali name (Nepali: भोटे कोशी, romanized: Bhōṭē kōśī). In the Nepali language, bhote or bhotiya means Tibetan, while koshi means river. The name is not unique: a western tributary of the upper Dudh Kosi is also called Bhote Koshi. The upper course of the Trishuli River in Rasuwa District is likewise known as Bhote Koshi.

It was called Po Chu (Tibetan: བོད་ཆུ, ZWPY: Bod chu) by early 1990s Everest expeditions, which name means the "river of Tibet." It is spelt Poiqu or Boqu (Chinese: 波曲) in Chinese sources.

The Tibetan name of the river is Matsang Tsangpo (Tibetan: མ་གཙང་གཙང་པོ།).

== River course ==
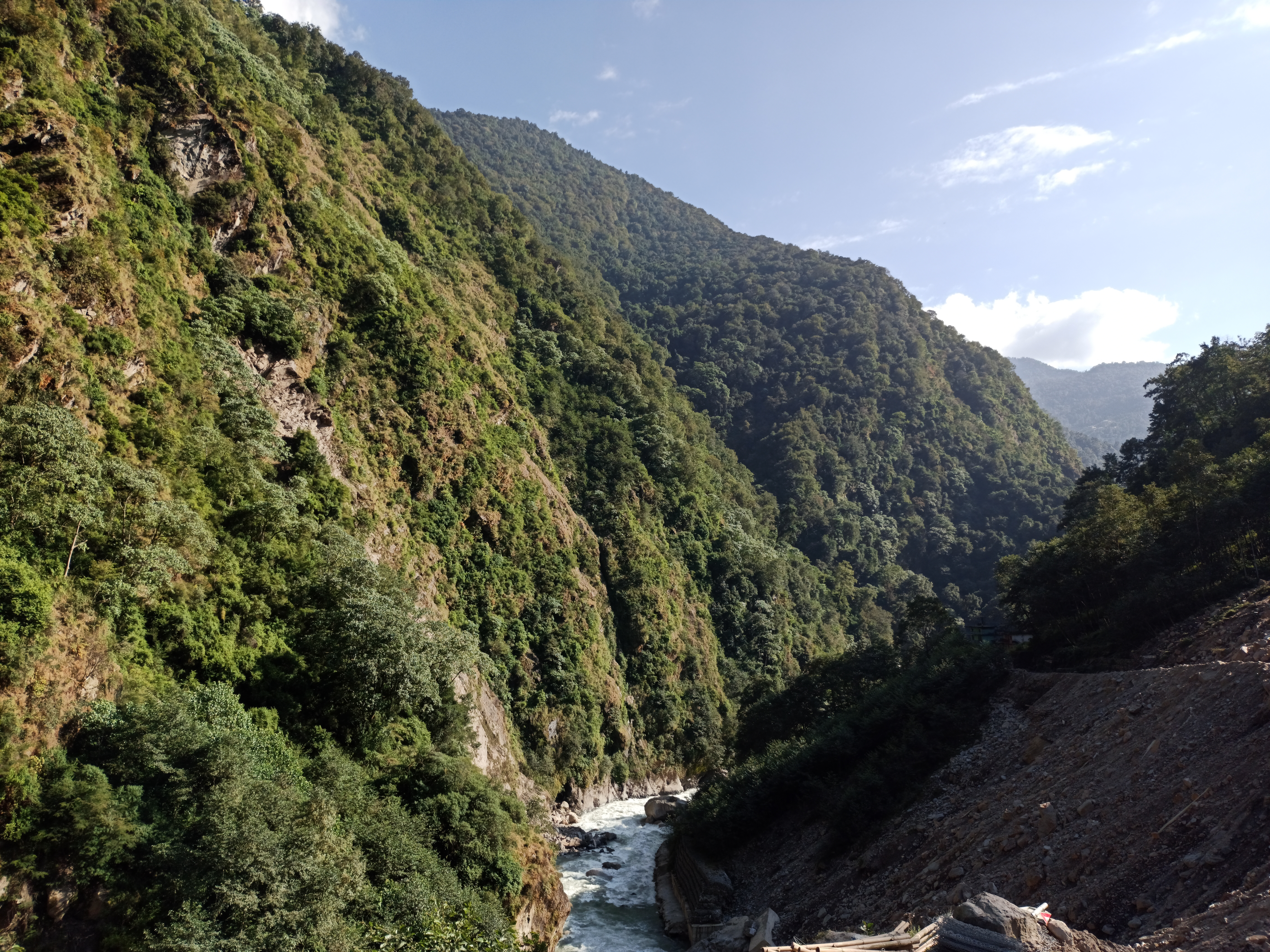
Bhote Koshi River in Tataopani, Sindhupalchok District, Nepal

The headwaters of the Poiqu and Bhote-Sun Koshi River are located at the Zhangzangbo Glacier in Tibet. The river flows out of the Lumi Chimi lake. When entering Nepal, it is called the Bhote Koshi. Further downstream, from the village of Bahrabise onwards, it is called the Sun Koshi.

== Hazards ==
In July 1981, a sudden ice avalanche caused a glacial lake outburst flood from the moraine-dammed Zhangzangbu-Cho Lake in the headwaters of the Bhote Koshi. The ensuing flow destroyed bridges, and sections of both the Arniko and the Nepal–China highways.

== Tourism and sports ==
The Bhote Kosi is used for both rafting and kayaking. It is the steepest river rafted in Nepal, with a gradient of 15 m per km. Bungee jumping or swinging over the Bhote Kosi has been described as the ‘ultimate experience’.

The river carves a steep and direct drop at the top that gradually eases to more placid streams and calmer pools with a 46-km run at the Lamosunga dam. The rapids are class IV-V at high flow, and III at lower levels. The river is steep and continuous with one rapid leading into another.
