= Lower Himalayan Range =

Inner mountain range of the Himalayas

Coordinates: 28°45′N 83°30′E

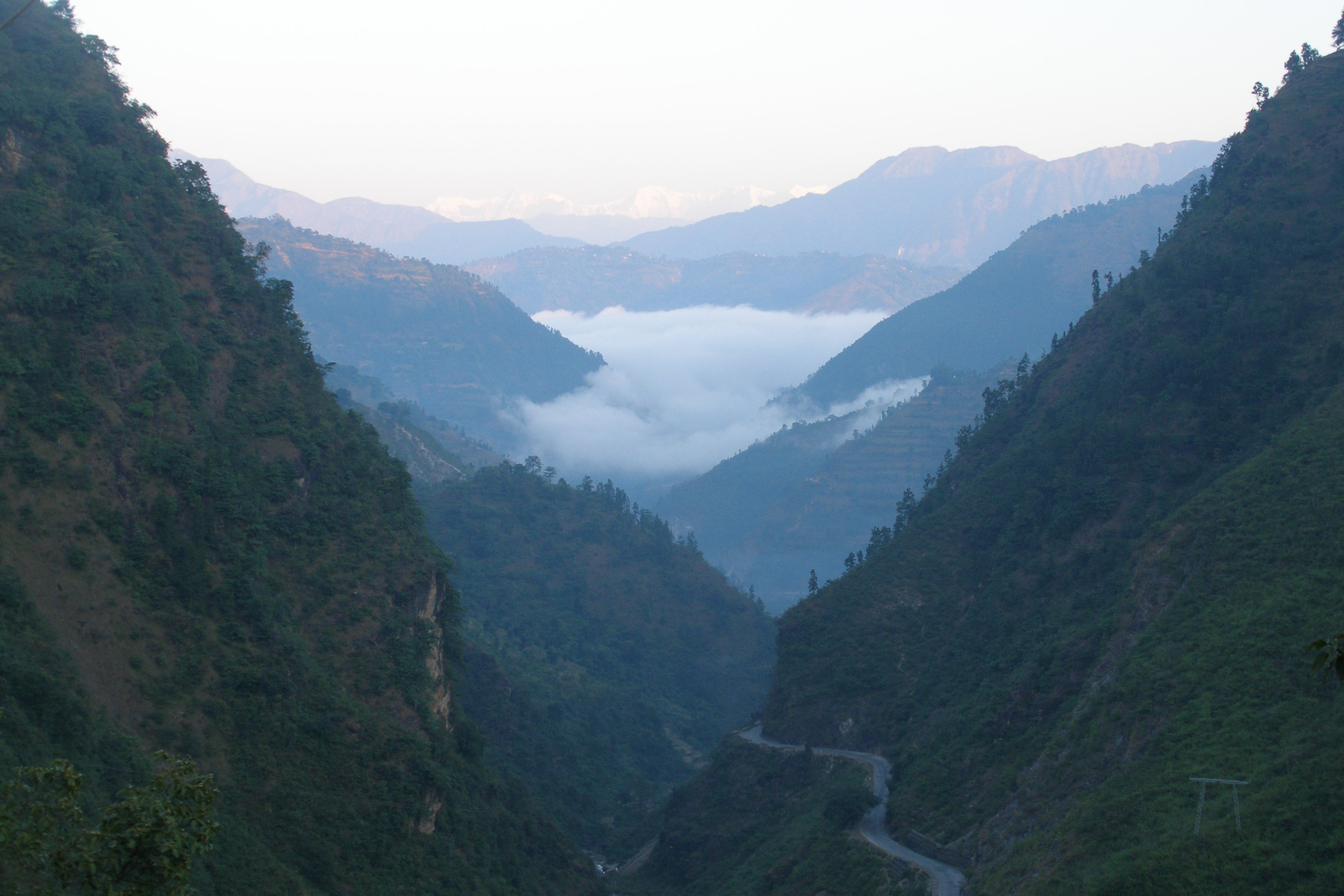
Lower Himalayan Range in Tansen, Nepal with the Great Himalayas in the background.

The Lower Himalayan Range, also called the Lesser Himalayas and Mahabharat Lekh or Himachal, is one of the four parallel sub-ranges of the Himalayas. It has the Great Himalayas to the north and the Sivalik Hills to the south. It extends from the Indus River Basin to the Brahmaputra Valley, traversing across Afghanistan, Pakistan, India, Nepal, China and Bhutan. The sub-range has an average elevation of 3,700–4,500 m (12,100–14,800 ft).

== Background ==
Southern slopes of the Himachal Range are steep and nearly uninhabited due to a major fault system called the 'Main Boundary Thrust". The crest and northern slopes slope gently enough to support upland pastures and terraced fields. Nepal's densely populated Middle Hills begin along the crest, extending north through lower valleys and other "hills" until population thins out above 2,000 m and cereal-based agriculture increasingly gives way to seasonal herding and cold-tolerant crops such as potatoes.

Most ethnic groups found along the Himachal Range and northward into the Middle Hills have Tibeto-Burman affinities including Nepalese origins of Newar, Magar, Gurung, Tamang, Rai and Limbu, however the most populous ethnic group is Indo-European Hindus called Paharis, mainly of the upper Brahman, and Kshatriya, or Chhetri castes. Lower terrain south of the escarpment was historically malarial and inhabited by apparently aboriginal peoples with evolved immunity, notably the Tharu and Maithil people.

The Himachal Range is an important hydrographic barrier crossed by relatively few rivers. Drainage systems have evolved candelabra configurations with numerous tributaries flowing south from the Himalaya through the Middle Hills, gathering immediately north of the Himachal Range and cutting through in major gorges as the Karnali in the west, the Gandaki or Narayani in central Nepal, and the Kosi in the east. With temperatures persisting around forty degrees Celsius in the plains of India from April until the onset of the summer monsoon in June, but ten to fifteen degrees cooler atop the Himachal Range, various hill Stations have developed in the region.
