= Tribeni, Udayapur =

Town in Sagarmatha Zone, Nepal

Coordinates: 26°57′N 86°18′E

Triveni त्रिवेणी
- Interactive map of Triveni
- Country: Nepal
- Zone: Sagarmatha Zone
- District: Udayapur District

Population (1991)
  - Total: 6,015
- Time zone: UTC+5:45 (Nepal Time)

Triveni is a town in Katari Municipality, Udayapur District, in the Sagarmatha Zone of south-eastern Nepal. The former Triveni village development committee was merged to form a new municipality in May 2014. At the 1991 Nepal census, Triveni had a population of 6,015 people, living in 1,105 individual households.
