= Tatopani Hot Spring (Sindhupalchok) =

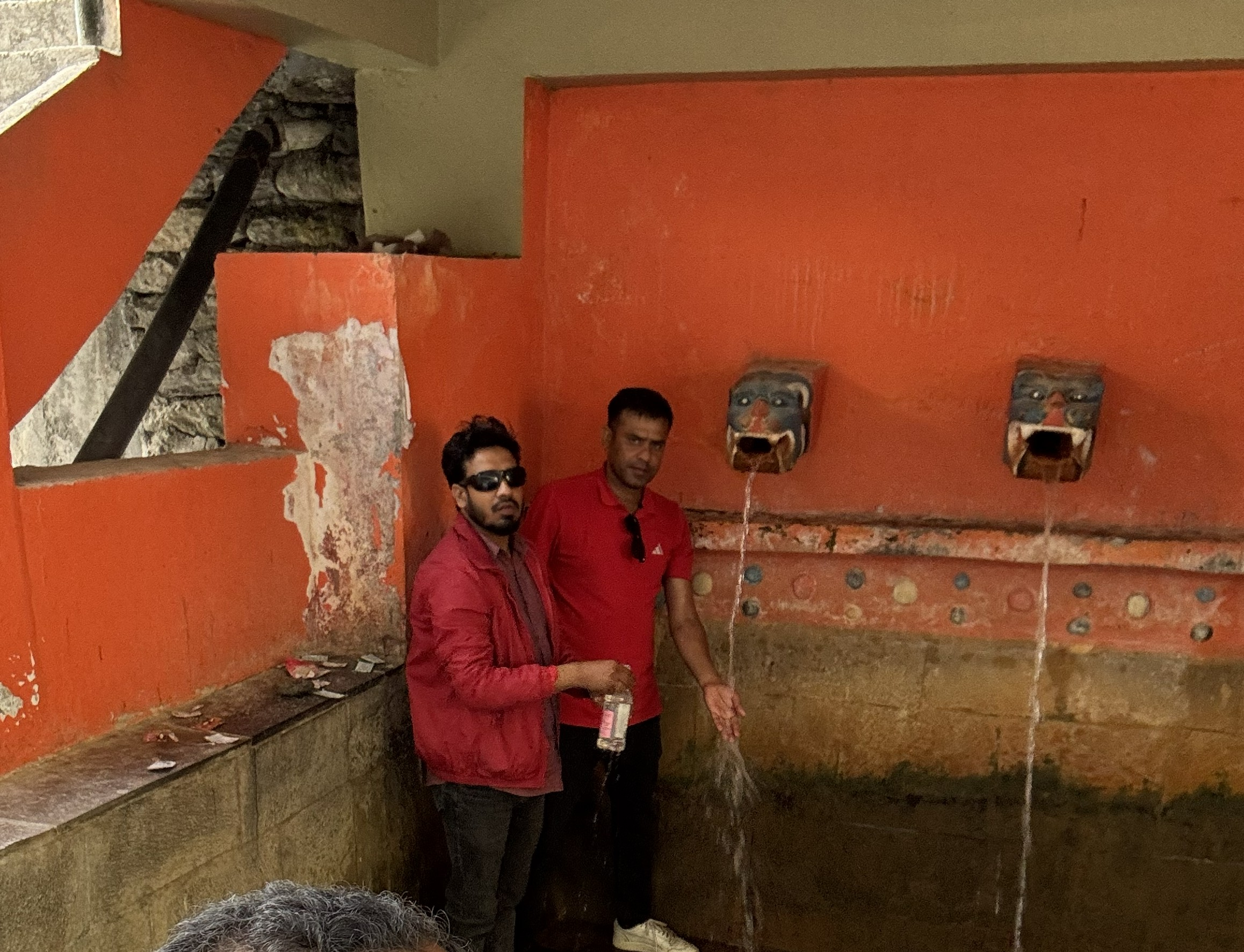
- Interactive map of Tatopani Hot Spring (Sindhupalchok)
- Location: Bhotekoshi Rural Municipality, Sindhupalchok, Bagmati Province, Nepal
- Coordinates: 27°59′N 85°56′E
- Type: Geothermal hot spring
- Temperature: 44 °C (111 °F)

Tatopani Hot Spring is a natural geothermal hot spring located in the Bhotekoshi Rural Municipality of Sindhupalchok District, Bagmati Province, central Nepal. Situated along the Araniko Highway near the Kodari border crossing between Nepal and China's Tibet Autonomous Region, it is one of the most prominent natural hot water springs in Nepal.

The name "Tatopani" literally translates to "hot water" in the Nepali language.
