= Friendship Highway (China–Nepal) =

Highway connecting Tibet with the Chinese/Nepalese border

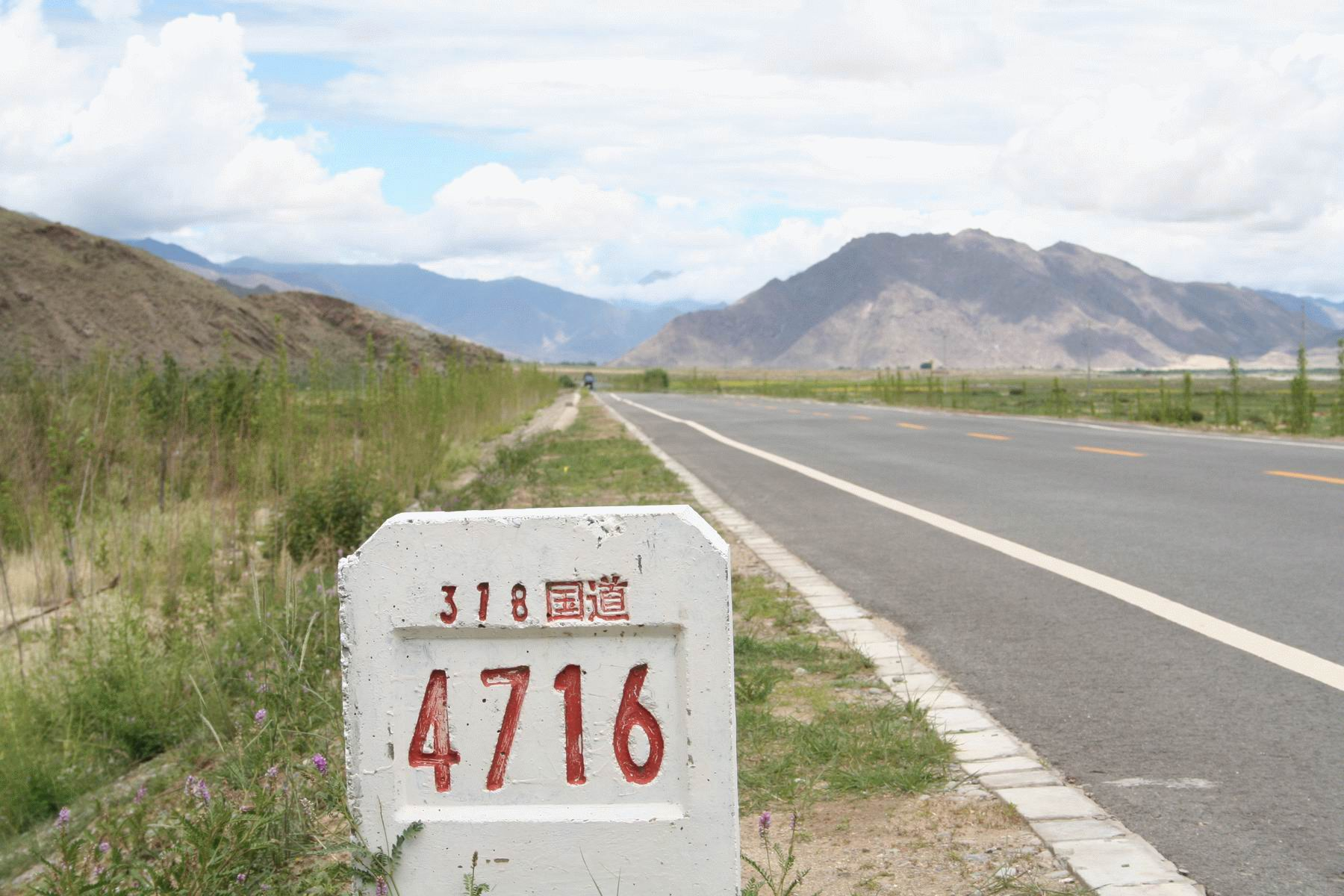

Route information
- Length: 806 km (501 mi)

Major junctions
- From: Lhasa, China
- To: Zhangmu, China

The Friendship Highway (also known as the China-Nepal Highway, Chinese: 中尼公路; pinyin: Zhongni Gonglu) is an 800-kilometre (500 mi) scenic route connecting the capital of Tibet, Lhasa, with the Chinese/Nepalese border at the Sino-Nepal Friendship Bridge between Zhangmu and Kodari. It includes the westernmost part of China National Highway 318 (Shanghai-Zhangmu) and crosses three passes over 5,000 m (16,400 ft) before dropping to 1,750 m (5,700 ft) at the border.

The 2015 earthquakes in the region closed the highway and caused many evacuations. By 2016, there were some repairs but trading on the route was not restored to pre-quake levels.

== Background ==
From Lhasa, the Friendship Highway follows the Kyi Chu river for about 60 km (40 mi) up to the confluence with the Yarlung Tsangpo River at Chushul. The main route continues along the Yarlung valley up to Shigatse, Tibet's second-largest city and formerly the home of the Panchen Lamas. A subsidiary branch crosses the Yarlung Tsangpo at Chushul and crosses the 4,800 m (15,750 ft) high Gampa La, passes along turquoise Yamdrok Yutso lake before crossing the 5,045 m (16,550 ft) high Karo La at the foot of Noijin Kangsang, and following downstream the Nyang Chu valley through Gyantse up to Shigatse.

From Shigatse, continuing west parallel to the Yarlung Tsangpo valley, the road passes Lhatse and forks just beyond at Chapu, where China National Highway 219 continues west and upriver, finally crossing the Brahmaputra/Indus divide near sacred Mount Kailash and Lake Manasarovar, then on to Ali in Gar County.

From Chapu near Lhatse, the Friendship Highway maintains the Hwy 318 route number and turns southwest and crosses the main Brahmaputra-Ganges divide at Gyatso La (5,260 m (17,260 ft)), the highest pass on the road. Descending 1,000 m (3,300 ft) onto alluvial plains of the Bum-Chu, also known as the Arun river in Nepal, the highway passes near Shelkar (New Tingri) then through Old Tingri, both gateways to Rongbuk Monastery and the north side of Mount Everest.

Continuing southwest, the highway climbs over Lalung La (5,050 m (16,570 ft)) and crosses shortly after the Tong La (also known as Thong La, Yakri Shung La or Yakrushong La) (5,150 m (16,900 ft)), which marks the water divide between the Bum-Chu/Arun and the (Matsang Tsangpo/Sun Kosi) rivers. The Friendship Highway then descends along the Matsang Tsangpo through Nyalam, then more steeply through a canyon to Zhangmu. The road ends at the Friendship Bridge on the China-Nepal border at a mere 1,750 m (5,740 ft) elevation. The continuation of the road between the border town of Kodari to Kathmandu is named Arniko Rajmarg.

Scenery along the highway features important cultural monuments, the upper valley of the Yarlung Tsangpo (Brahmaputra) River, vast grasslands and meadows, and mountain vistas including five of the world's highest peaks: Everest, Lhotse, Makalu, Cho Oyu and Shishapangma as well as partially unexplored and unclimbed peaks east of Tong La reaching 7,367 m (24,170 ft) at Labuche Kang.

== Gallery ==
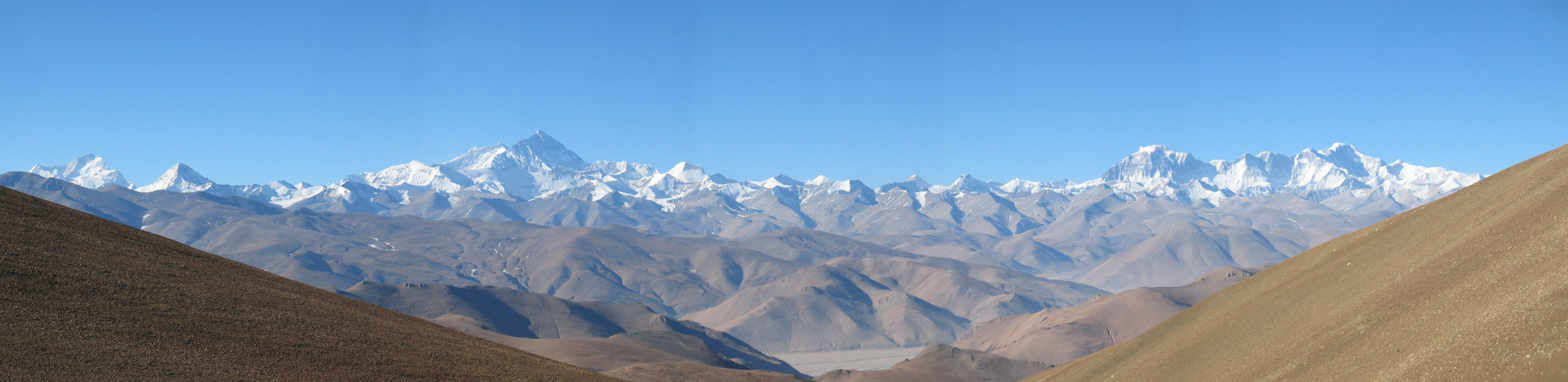
Northern panoramic view of Everest from below the Gyawu La pass on the Friendship Highway between Lhatse and Shelkar en route to Everest

== See also ==
- China National Highway 318
- Everest road
- Araniko Highway
- Gyirong Port
