= China National Highway 318 =

National highway from Shanghai to the China–Nepal border

China National Highway 318
- 318国道
- Shanghai–Nyalam Highway 上海—聂拉木公路 (沪聂线)

Route information
- Length: 5,476 km (3,403 mi)

Major junctions
- From: People's Square, Shanghai
- To: Sino-Nepal Friendship Bridge, Zhangmu, Tibet Autonomous Region; NH34

Location
- Country: China

Highway system
- National Trunk Highway System; Primary; Auxiliary
← G317	→ G319

China National Highway 318 (G318), officially the Shanghai–Nyalam Highway (Chinese: 上海—聂拉木公路), is an east–west national highway in China. The route extends approximately 5,476 kilometres (3,403 mi) from People's Square in Shanghai to the Sino-Nepal Friendship Bridge at Zhangmu Port in Nyalam County, Tibet Autonomous Region, on the China–Nepal border. At the border, it connects across the Friendship Bridge with Nepal's Araniko Highway, designated National Highway 34 (NH34), which continues towards Kathmandu.

G318 crosses the provincial-level divisions of Shanghai, Jiangsu, Zhejiang, Anhui, Hubei, Chongqing, Sichuan and the Tibet Autonomous Region. The 2022 National Highway Network Plan lists its principal control points as Shanghai, Qingpu, Wujiang, Huzhou, Xuancheng, Wuhan, Yichang, Chongqing, Chengdu, Ya'an, Kangding, Markam, Nyingchi, Lhasa, Shigatse, Tingri and Nyalam, terminating at Zhangmu Port.

The highway includes much of the southern route of the Sichuan–Tibet Highway between Sichuan and Lhasa. West of Lhasa, the route through Shigatse and Zhangmu forms part of the road connection between China and Nepal that is commonly called the Friendship Highway. The Lhasa–Zhangmu section is also part of Asian Highway 42 (AH42), which continues through Nepal and India.

At 5,476 kilometres (3,403 mi), G318 is one of China's longest national highways. It was formerly frequently described as the country's longest, but the expanded G219, which extends for approximately 10,065 kilometres (6,254 mi), is now longer.

== Route ==
G318 begins at People's Square in central Shanghai and runs west through the municipality towards Qingpu District. In Shanghai the road is also known as the Huqingping Highway (沪青平公路). It then crosses Wujiang District of Suzhou, Jiangsu, before entering Zhejiang near Huzhou.

From Zhejiang, G318 continues west across Anhui through Xuancheng, Chizhou and Anqing, and then enters Hubei. It passes through the Wuhan metropolitan area before continuing through Jingzhou, Yichang and the mountainous western part of Hubei towards Lichuan.

The highway then crosses the municipality of Chongqing, including Wanzhou and Liangping, before entering Sichuan. Its Sichuan route runs through the eastern part of the province to Nanchong, Suining and Chengdu, and then west through Ya'an, Luding, Kangding, Yajiang, Litang and Batang.

=== Sichuan–Tibet section ===
West of Ya'an, G318 follows much of the southern route of the Sichuan–Tibet Highway. Construction of the original Kangding–Tibet road began at Ya'an in 1950, and the road reached Lhasa in 1954. The route later became known as the Sichuan–Tibet Highway; the southern route was subsequently incorporated into G318.

The Sichuan–Tibet section crosses the eastern margin of the Tibetan Plateau through a succession of high mountain ranges and deeply incised river valleys. The national government continues to classify improvement of G318's Sichuan–Tibet corridor as a strategic transport priority; the 2022 National Highway Network Plan specifically calls for upgrading the G318 Sichuan–Tibet Highway.

Numerous sections have been realigned or bypassed by tunnels and bridges to avoid high mountain passes and landslide-prone slopes. The former route through the Tongmai area in eastern Tibet, once particularly vulnerable to landslides and debris flows, has for example been replaced by improved roads, tunnels and the Tongmai Bridge.

=== Tibet and Nepal connection ===
G318 enters the Tibet Autonomous Region at Markam, continuing through Zogang, Baxoi, Bomê, Nyingchi, Gongbo'gyamda, Maizhokunggar and Lhasa. From Lhasa it runs southwest through Qüxü, Nyêmo and Shigatse, then through Lhatse, Tingri and Nyalam County.

Between Lhasa and Zhangmu, G318 forms part of Asian Highway 42. The internationally designated AH42 route continues from Lhasa through Zhangmu, Kodari, Kathmandu, Narayanghat and Birgunj before entering India.

The final section descends from Nyalam through the steep Himalayan valley to Zhangmu. The 8.078-kilometre (5.019 mi) Zhangmu–Friendship Bridge section was reconstructed following the 2015 Nepal earthquake and reopened on 17 May 2019. The present Sino-Nepal Friendship Bridge opened later that month and forms the western terminus of G318.

At the bridge, G318 connects with Nepal's Araniko Highway (NH34). The bridge also carries the Zhangmu–Kodari international border crossing. Customs, immigration and the detailed history of the border port are covered at Sino-Nepal Friendship Bridge § Border port.

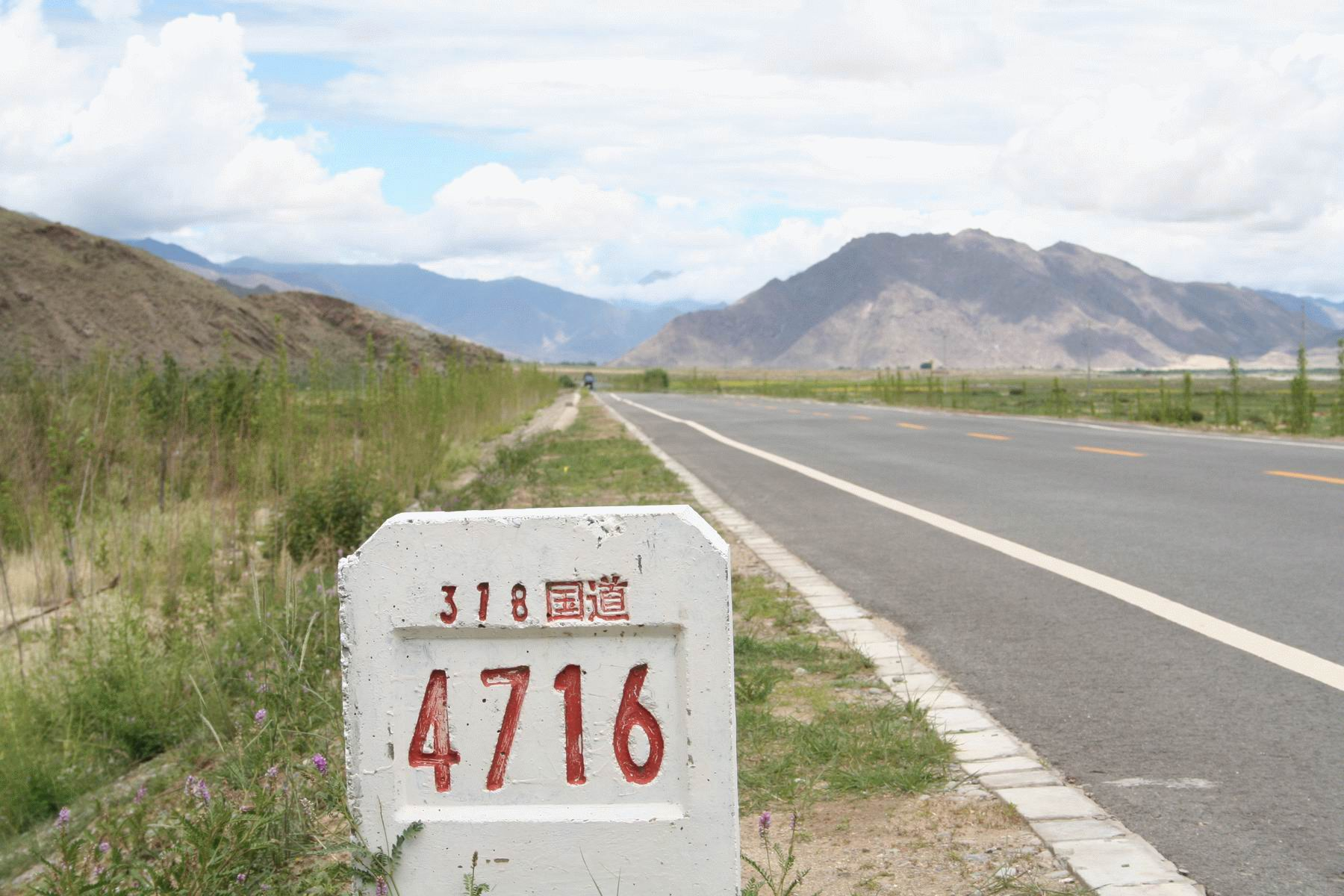
G318 between Doilungdêqên and Qüxü County

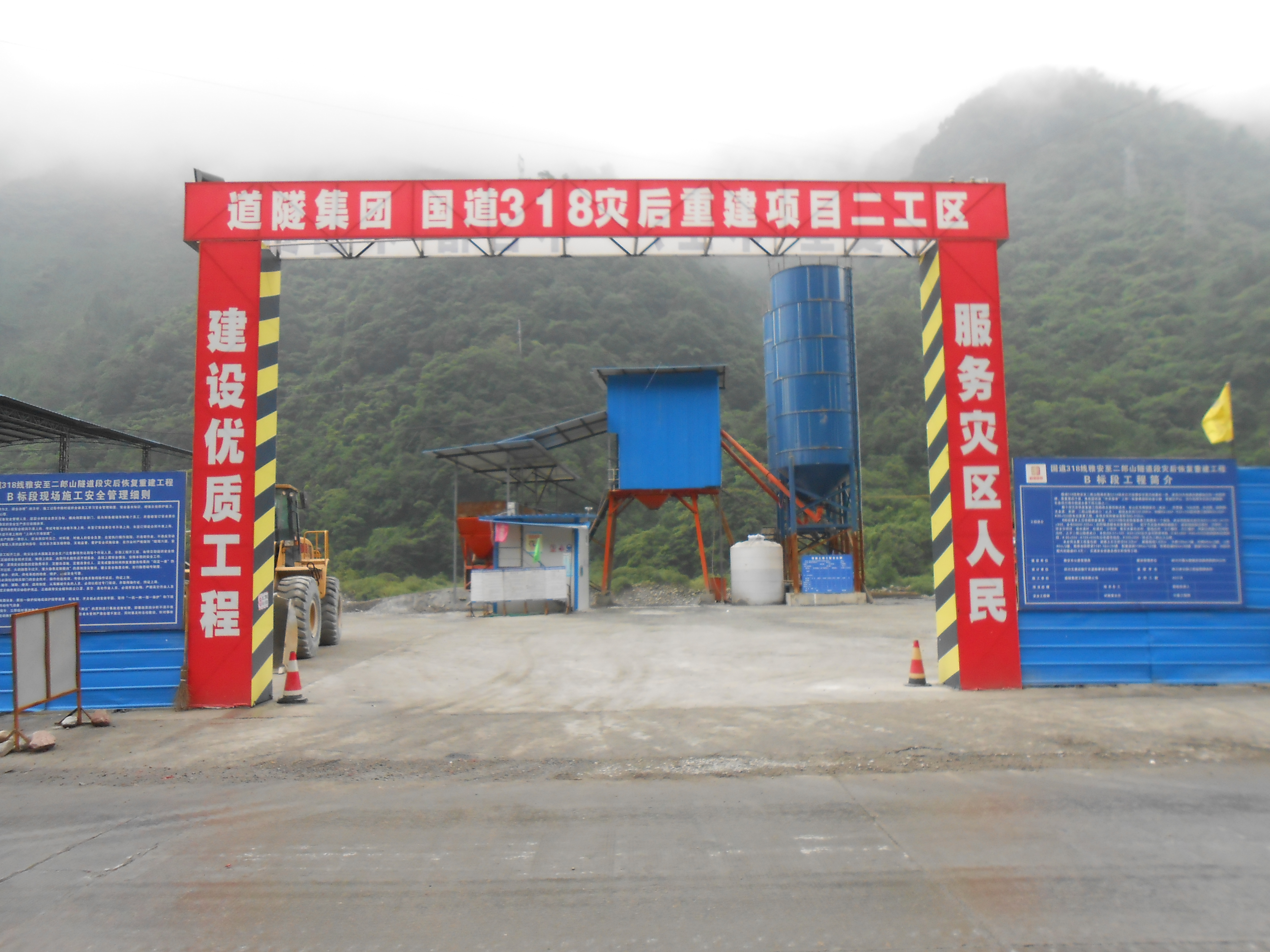
Road construction on G318

== Tourism ==
G318 has become a prominent long-distance driving and cycling route, particularly on its Sichuan–Tibet section. Chinese tourism authorities and local governments promote the highway for the diversity of landscapes along its route, which extends from the lowlands of eastern China through the Sichuan Basin and the mountains of western Sichuan to the Tibetan Plateau.

The route has frequently been promoted in China as the "scenic avenue of the Chinese people" (中国人的景观大道). Its tourism profile is particularly associated with the Chengdu–Lhasa section, which crosses high passes, river gorges, forests, grasslands and alpine landscapes. Tourism development along G318 has also led local governments to establish road-themed visitor facilities and long-distance self-driving tourism programmes.

== Route and distance ==
The following table retains selected cumulative mileage points traditionally published for the 5,476-kilometre (3,403 mi) Shanghai–Zhangmu route. G318 has undergone numerous local realignments and reconstruction projects, so these historical cumulative figures do not necessarily correspond to the engineering chainage of every present-day road section.

Selected cumulative mileage points on G318
Place	Provincial-level division	Distance from Shanghai (km)
Huangpu, Shanghai	Shanghai	0
Qingpu, Shanghai	Shanghai	38
Huzhou, Zhejiang	Zhejiang	158
Changxing, Zhejiang	Zhejiang	185
Guangde, Anhui	Anhui	240
Xuanzhou, Anhui	Anhui	308
Nanling, Anhui	Anhui	356
Qingyang, Anhui	Anhui	423
Guichi, Anhui	Anhui	466
Anqing, Anhui	Anhui	534
Huaining, Anhui	Anhui	571
Yuexi, Anhui	Anhui	651
Yingshan, Hubei	Hubei	761
Luotian, Hubei	Hubei	801
Xinzhou, Hubei	Hubei	874
Huangpi, Hubei	Hubei	926
Wuhan, Hubei	Hubei	979
Xiantao, Hubei	Hubei	1090
Qianjiang, Hubei	Hubei	1146
Jingzhou, Hubei	Hubei	1218
Zhijiang, Hubei	Hubei	1265
Xiaoting, Hubei	Hubei	1306
Yichang, Hubei	Hubei	1330
Lichuan, Hubei	Hubei	1721
Wanzhou, Chongqing	Chongqing	1871
Liangping, Chongqing	Chongqing	1953
Dazhu, Sichuan	Sichuan	2051
Qu County, Sichuan	Sichuan	2095
Nanchong, Sichuan	Sichuan	2198
Pengxi, Sichuan	Sichuan	2251
Suining, Sichuan	Sichuan	2369
Chengdu, Sichuan	Sichuan	2526
Shuangliu, Sichuan	Sichuan	2540
Xinjin, Sichuan	Sichuan	2562
Qionglai, Sichuan	Sichuan	2599
Mingshan, Sichuan	Sichuan	2654
Ya'an, Sichuan	Sichuan	2674
Tianquan, Sichuan	Sichuan	2711
Luding, Sichuan	Sichuan	2837
Kangding, Sichuan	Sichuan	2886
Yajiang, Sichuan	Sichuan	3037
Litang, Sichuan	Sichuan	3174
Batang, Sichuan	Sichuan	3345
Markam, Tibet Autonomous Region	Tibet	3450
Zogang, Tibet	Tibet	3608
Baxoi, Tibet	Tibet	3809
Bomê, Tibet	Tibet	4026
Nyingchi, Tibet	Tibet	4240
Gongbo'gyamda, Tibet	Tibet	4386
Maizhokunggar, Tibet	Tibet	4592
Dagzê, Tibet	Tibet	4639
Lhasa, Tibet	Tibet	4670
Doilungdêqên, Tibet	Tibet	4682
Qüxü, Tibet	Tibet	4731
Nyêmo, Tibet	Tibet	4807
Shigatse, Tibet	Tibet	4966
Lhatse, Tibet	Tibet	5123
Tingri, Tibet	Tibet	5214
Nyalam, Tibet	Tibet	5431
Sino-Nepal Friendship Bridge, Zhangmu, Tibet	Tibet	5476

== See also ==
- China National Highways
- Sichuan–Tibet Highway
- Friendship Highway (China–Nepal)
- Asian Highway 42
- Sino-Nepal Friendship Bridge
- Araniko Highway
