= Dolalghat =

Dolalghat दोलालघाट
- Village development committee
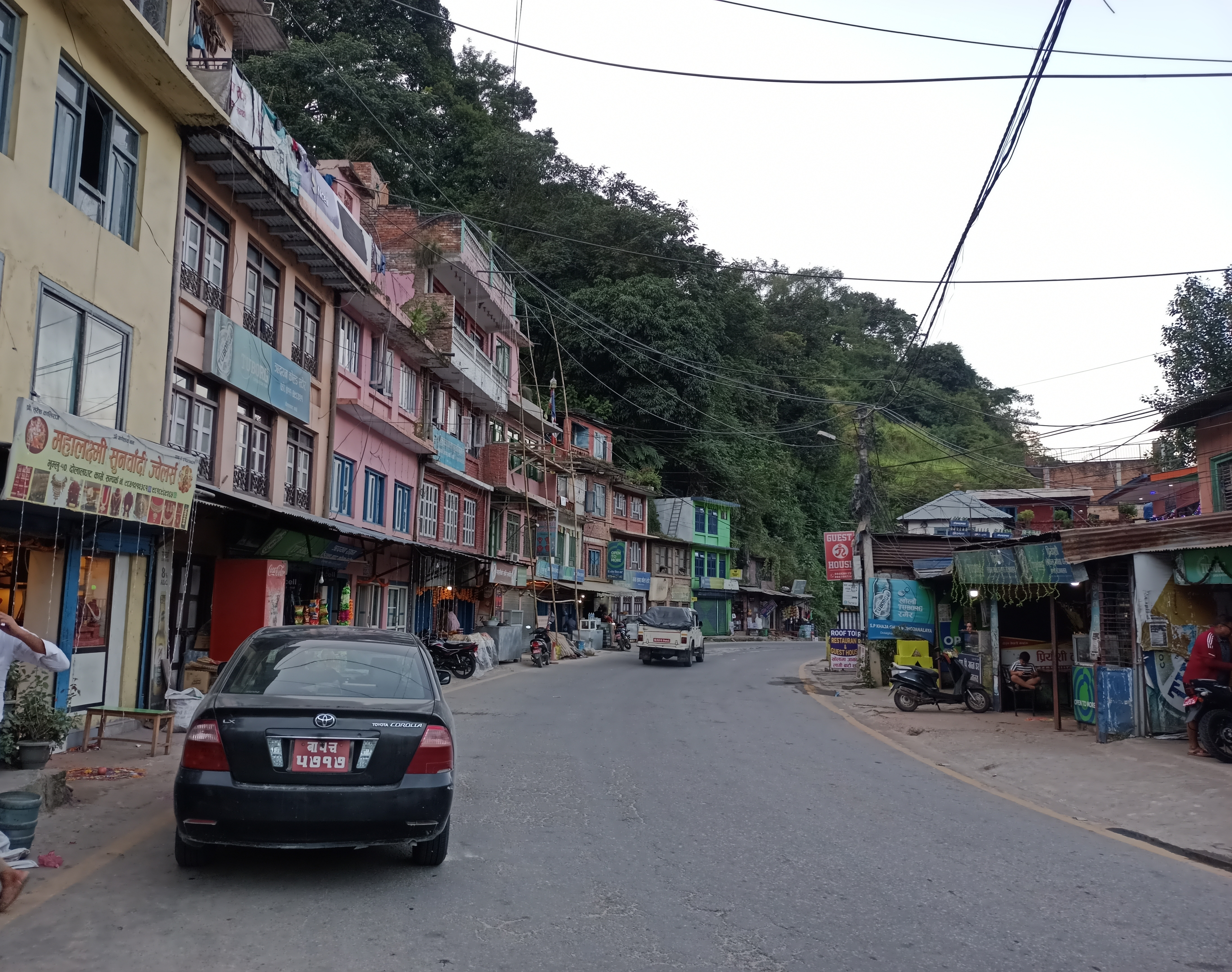
- Dolaghat Bazar in 2025

- Location in Nepal
- Coordinates: 27.6346°N 85.7023°E
- Country: Nepal
- Province: Bagmati Province
- District: Kabhrepalanchok District

Population (1991)
  - Total: 1,714
- Time zone: UTC+5:45 (Nepal Time)

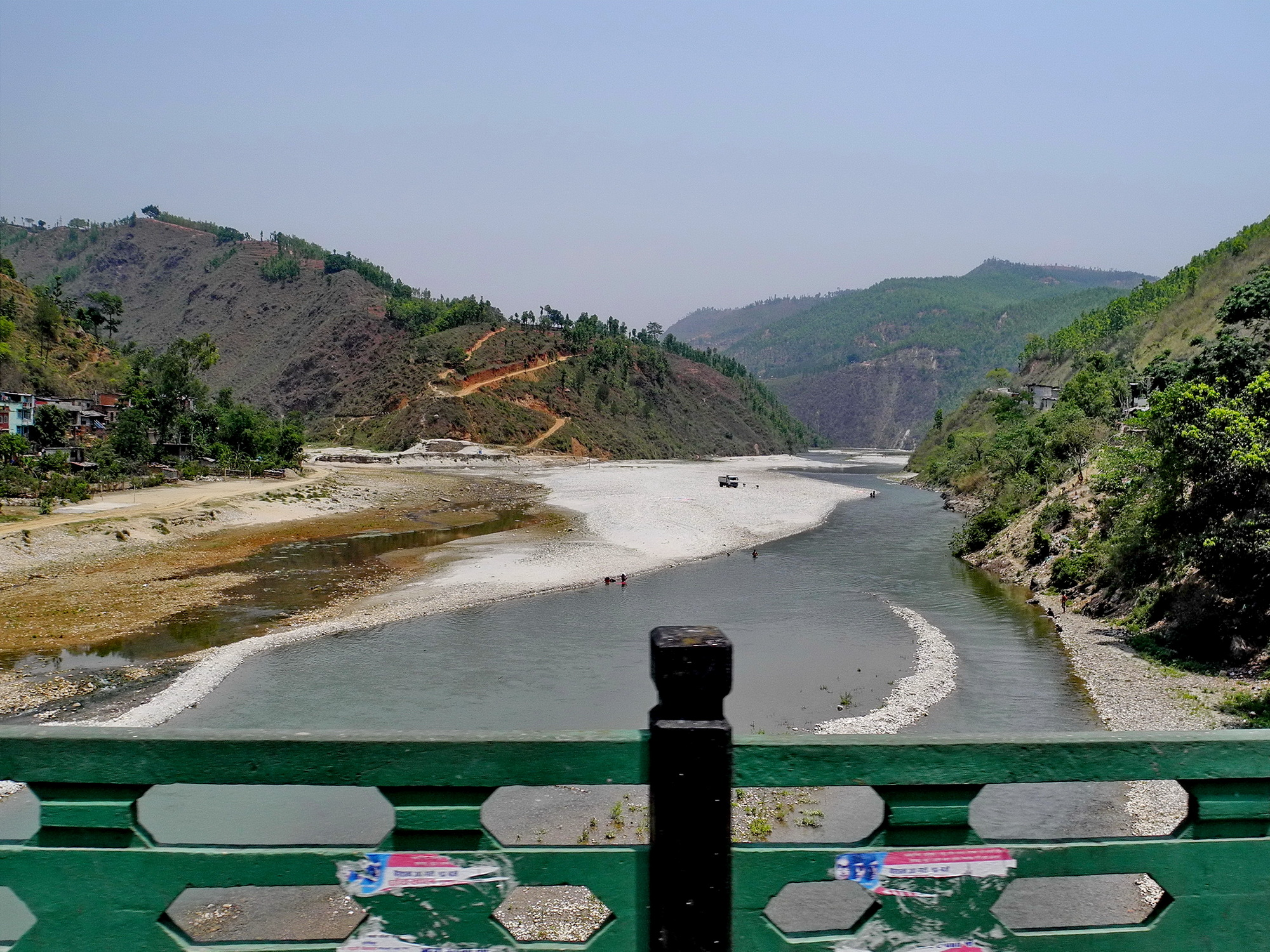
Dolalghat blue river

Dolalghat is a village development committee in Kavrepalanchok District in Bagmati Province of central Nepal.

== Demographics ==
At the time of the 1991 Nepal census it had a population of 1,714 and had 323 houses in it.

== Transport ==
It is linked by Araniko Highway which joins Kathmandu to Kodari.

== Climate ==
Climate data for Dolalghat, elevation 710 m (2,330 ft)
Month	Jan	Feb	Mar	Apr	May	Jun	Jul	Aug	Sep	Oct	Nov	Dec	Year
Mean daily maximum °C (°F)	20.1 (68.2)	22.7 (72.9)	28.0 (82.4)	32.0 (89.6)	32.6 (90.7)	31.9 (89.4)	30.1 (86.2)	29.8 (85.6)	29.5 (85.1)	28.7 (83.7)	24.9 (76.8)	21.1 (70.0)	27.6 (81.7)
Mean daily minimum °C (°F)	8.1 (46.6)	9.5 (49.1)	13.8 (56.8)	17.3 (63.1)	19.8 (67.6)	22.1 (71.8)	22.4 (72.3)	22.1 (71.8)	21.0 (69.8)	17.9 (64.2)	12.5 (54.5)	8.7 (47.7)	16.3 (61.3)
Average precipitation mm (inches)	12.3 (0.48)	15.1 (0.59)	26.3 (1.04)	50.0 (1.97)	93.1 (3.67)	190.9 (7.52)	288.8 (11.37)	264.4 (10.41)	135.2 (5.32)	44.1 (1.74)	6.4 (0.25)	9.2 (0.36)	1,135.8 (44.72)
Source 1: Australian National University
Source 2: Japan International Cooperation Agency (precipitation)
