= Araniko Highway =

Highway in central hilly Nepal

Araniko Highway अरनिको राजमार्ग
- राष्ट्रिय राजमार्ग ३४
- National Highway 34
- Araniko Highway in red

Route information
- Part of AH42
- Maintained by MoPIT (Department of Roads)
- Length: 112 km (70 mi)

Major junctions
- From: Kathmandu
- Road to Palanchowk at Lamidanda; Road to Jiri 14 km after Dolalghat
- To: Kodari (China) G318 Road

Location
- Country: Nepal
- Primary destinations: Banepa, Dhulikhel, Dolalghat, Lamosangu, Bahrabise

Highway system
- Roads in Nepal
← NH33	→ NH35

The Araniko Highway or NH 34 (Nepali: अरनिको राजमार्ग, Araniko Rājmārga) connects Kathmandu with Kodari, 112 kilometres (70 mi) northeast of the Kathmandu Valley, on the Nepal-China border. It is among the most dangerous of highways in Nepal due to extremely steep slopes on each side of the road from Tatopani Barabise onwards; massive landslides and bus plunges are not uncommon, especially after rains. The Sino-Nepal Friendship Bridge connects with China National Highway 318 to Lhasa, and eventually to Shanghai.

== History ==
The road was built in the 1960s with help from the Chinese on an older yak track. They also planned to expand the road in 2012, but keeping the route open was made more difficult by landslides from monsoons. The road became a conduit for a large amount of trade between China and Nepal, and also for some trade between India and China when it was open. Till 2021/023, this highway used to be named as National Highway 34.

== Etymology ==
The highway is named after Araniko, a 13th-century Nepalese architect who introduced Nepalese architectural styles to Tibet and China. It is said that he walked from Tibet to China by the route that is now named after him.

== Route ==
Dhulikhel, about 30 kilometres (19 mi) from Kathmandu and at an altitude of 1,585 metres (5,200 ft), is the last major town in the Kathmandu Valley through which the Araniko Highway passes. After Dhulikhel, the road descends into the beautiful Panchkhal Valley. A road junction at Lamidanda, around 12 km from Dhulikhel, leads to Palanchok, where Palanchok Bhagawati Temple is situated. About a minute's drive beyond the town of Panchkhal a dirt road takes off to the left, giving access to the Helambu region. About 8 km later, the highway touches Dolaghat, a thriving town at the confluence of the Indravati and the Sun Kosi rivers and the departure point for many rafting trips. The turn-off to Jiri is another 14 km away, on the right. Lamosangu is a few kilometres after the Jiri turn-off, on the Arniko Highway. Next comes Barabise and Tatopani, the final destination for many buses from Kathmandu. Just before Barabise is the confluence of the Bhote Kosi and Sun Kosi rivers. The remaining part to the Nepal border village of Kodari the road runs alongside the Sun Kosi with extremely steep Himalayan mountainsides that are very prone to landslides during and immediately after rains (including the monsoon). Beyond Kodari is the border town of Zhangmu in Tibet.

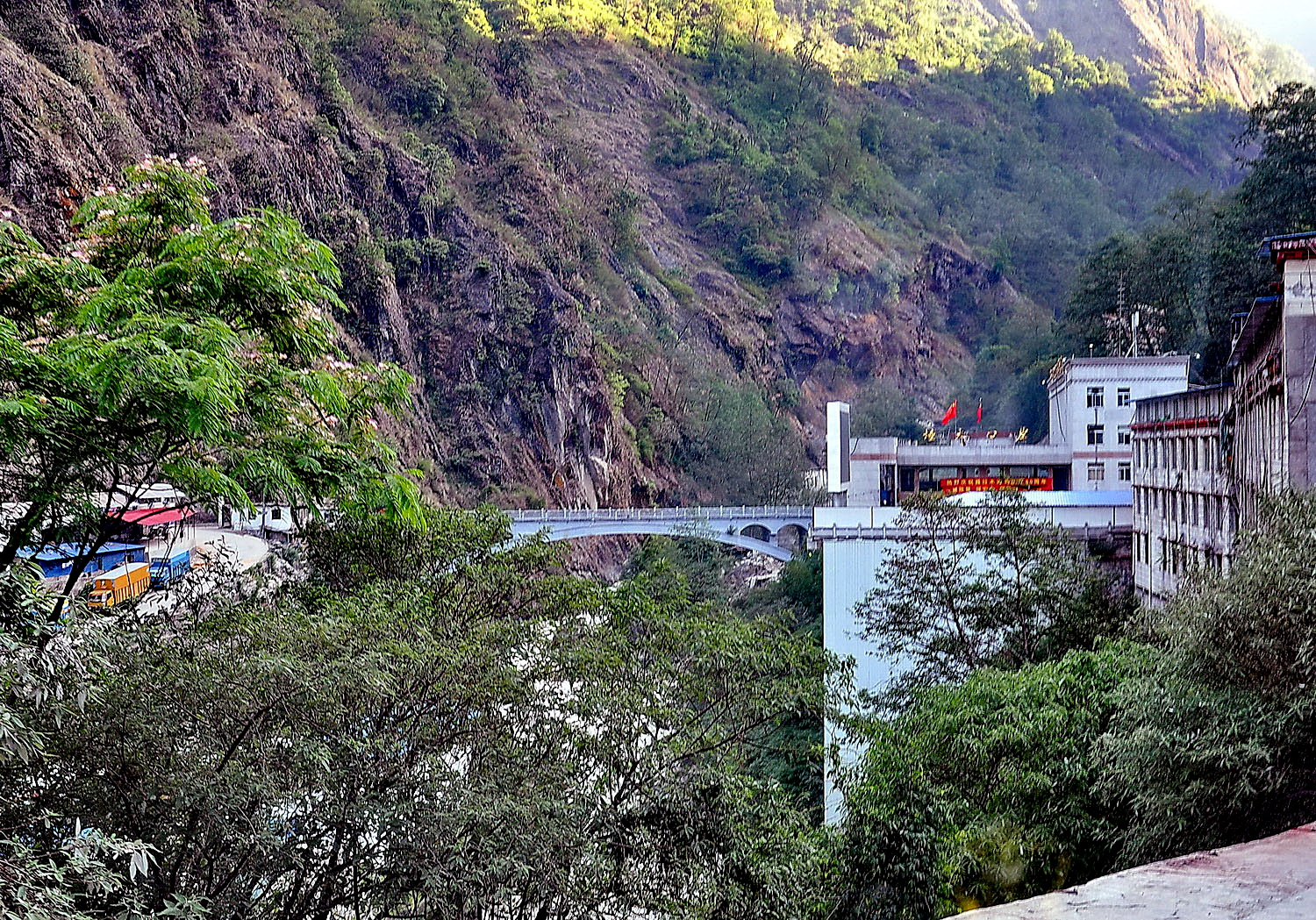
Friendship bridge between Zhangmu and Kodari

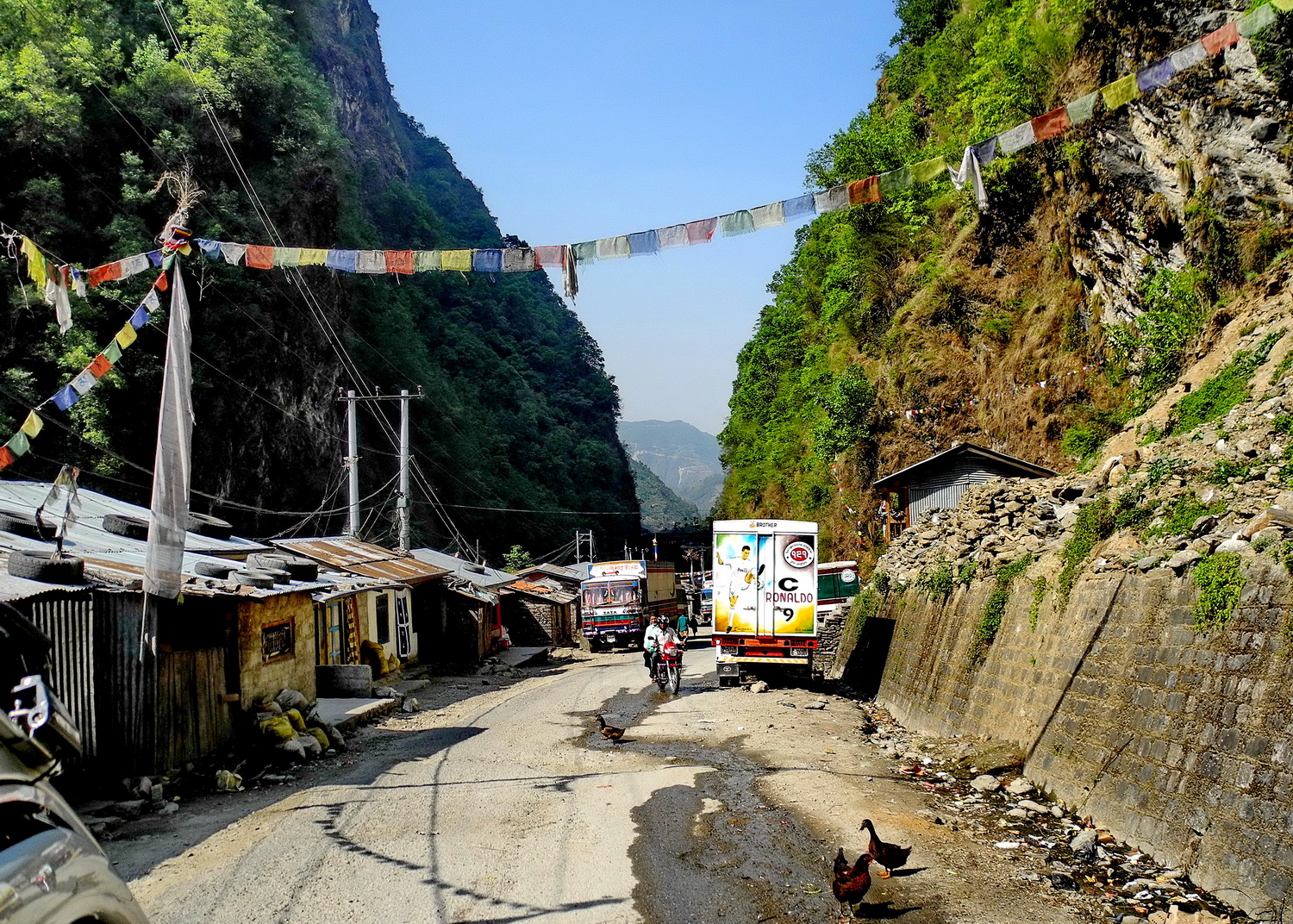
Arniko Highway in Kodari after the border with China

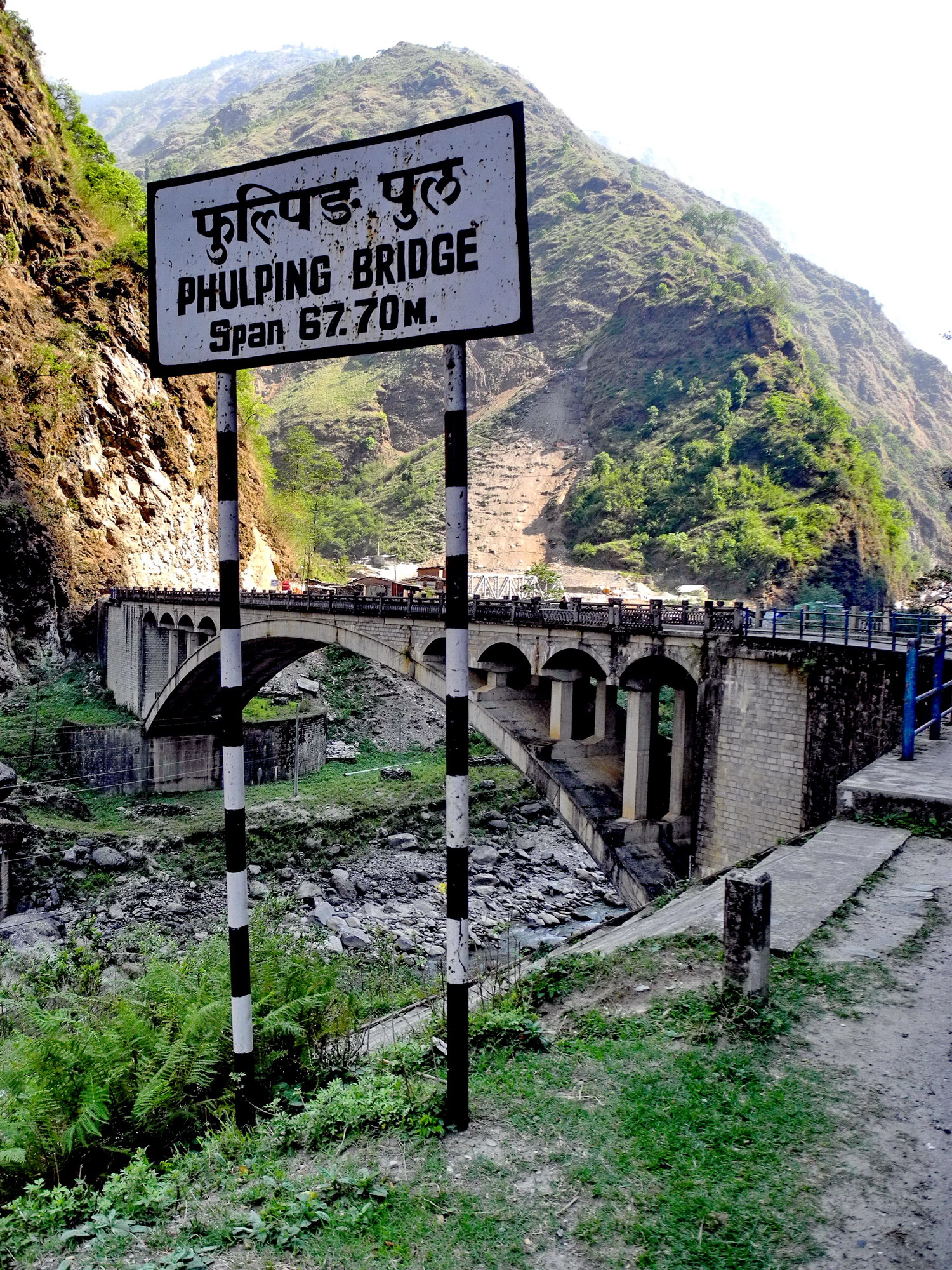
Araniko Highway: pulping bridge, just after the border with China

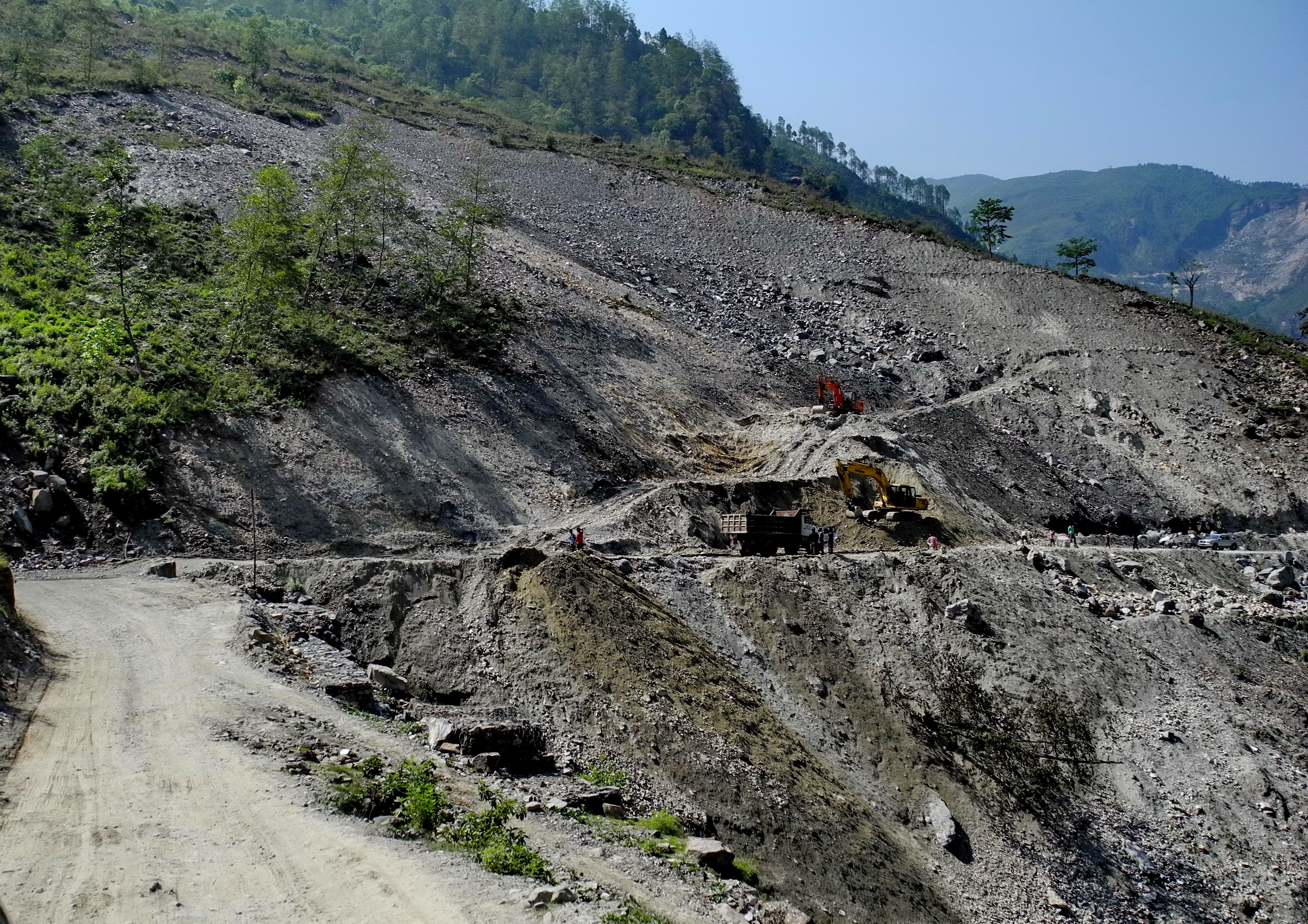
Araniko Highway in Kodari (Népal) just after border with China

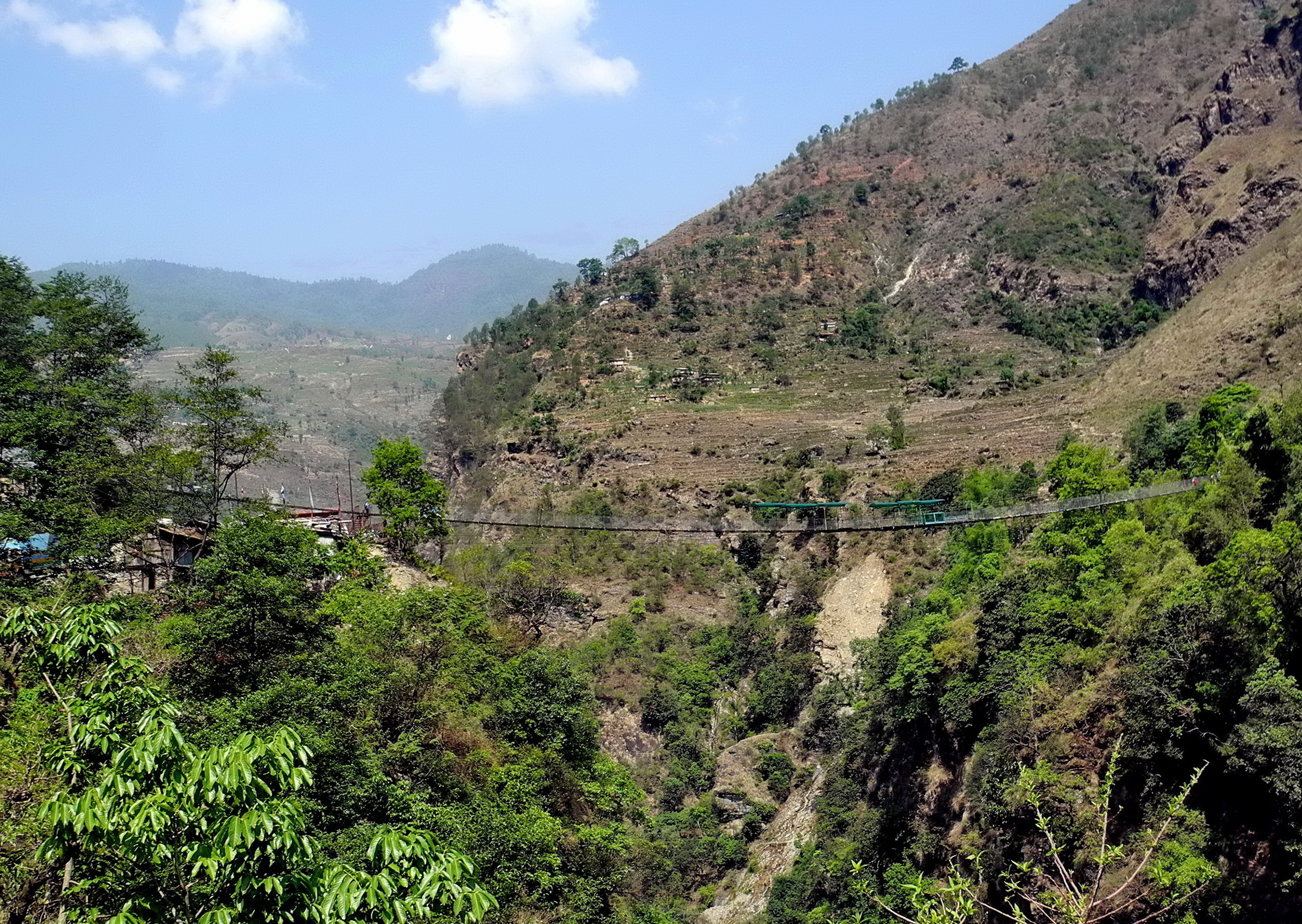
Koadri (Népal), last resort bridge on la Bothe-Kosi river

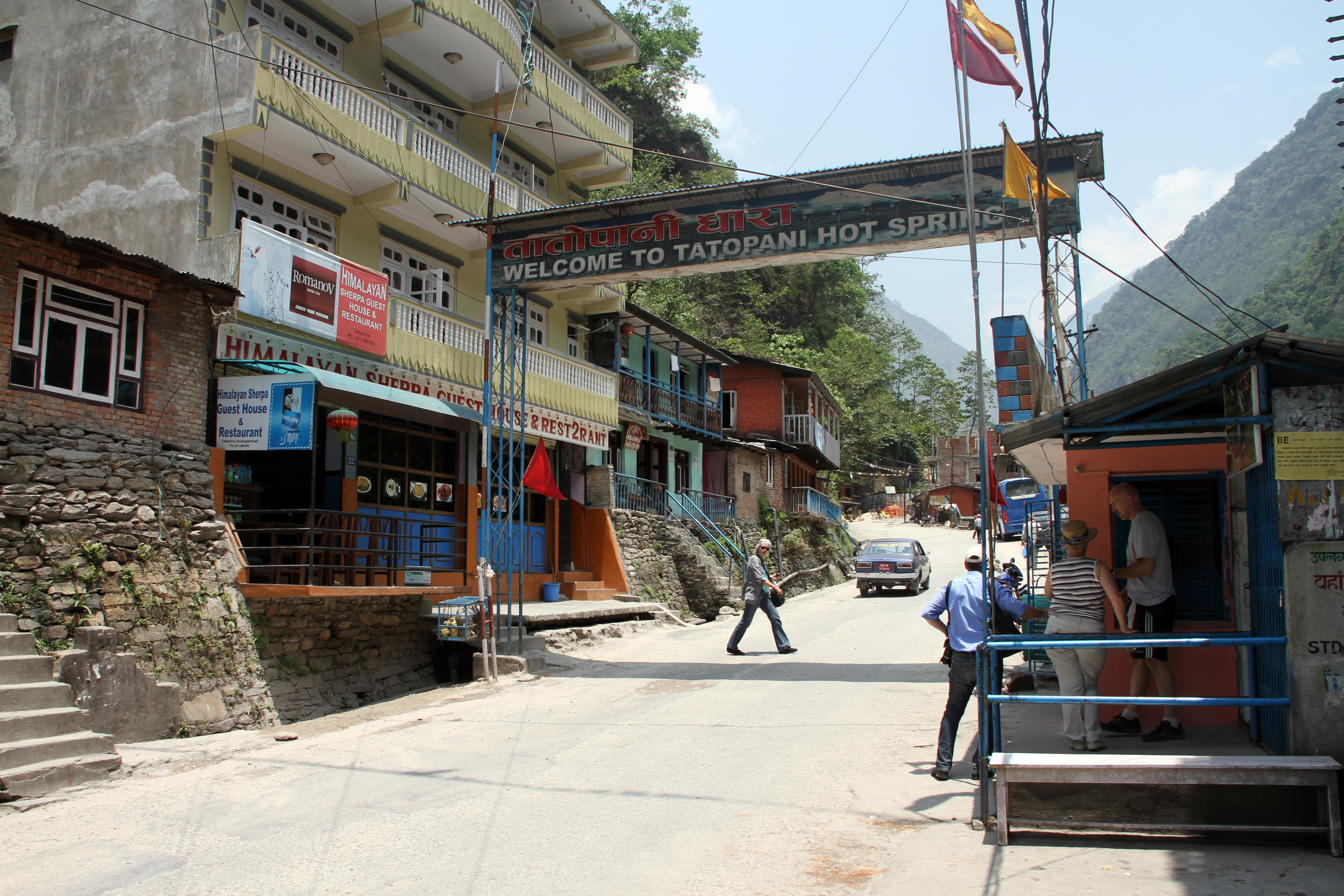
Tatopani spa

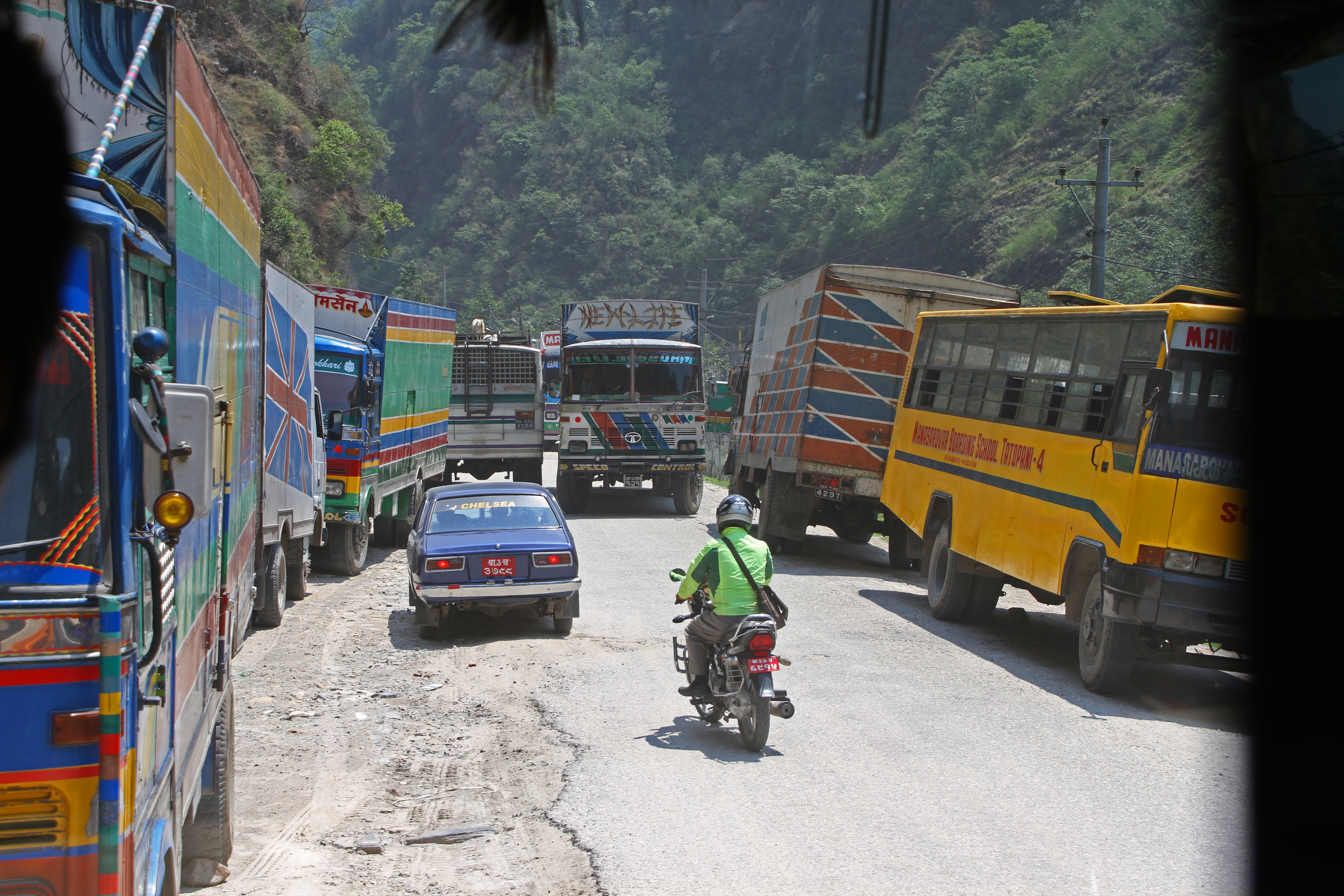
Checkpoint

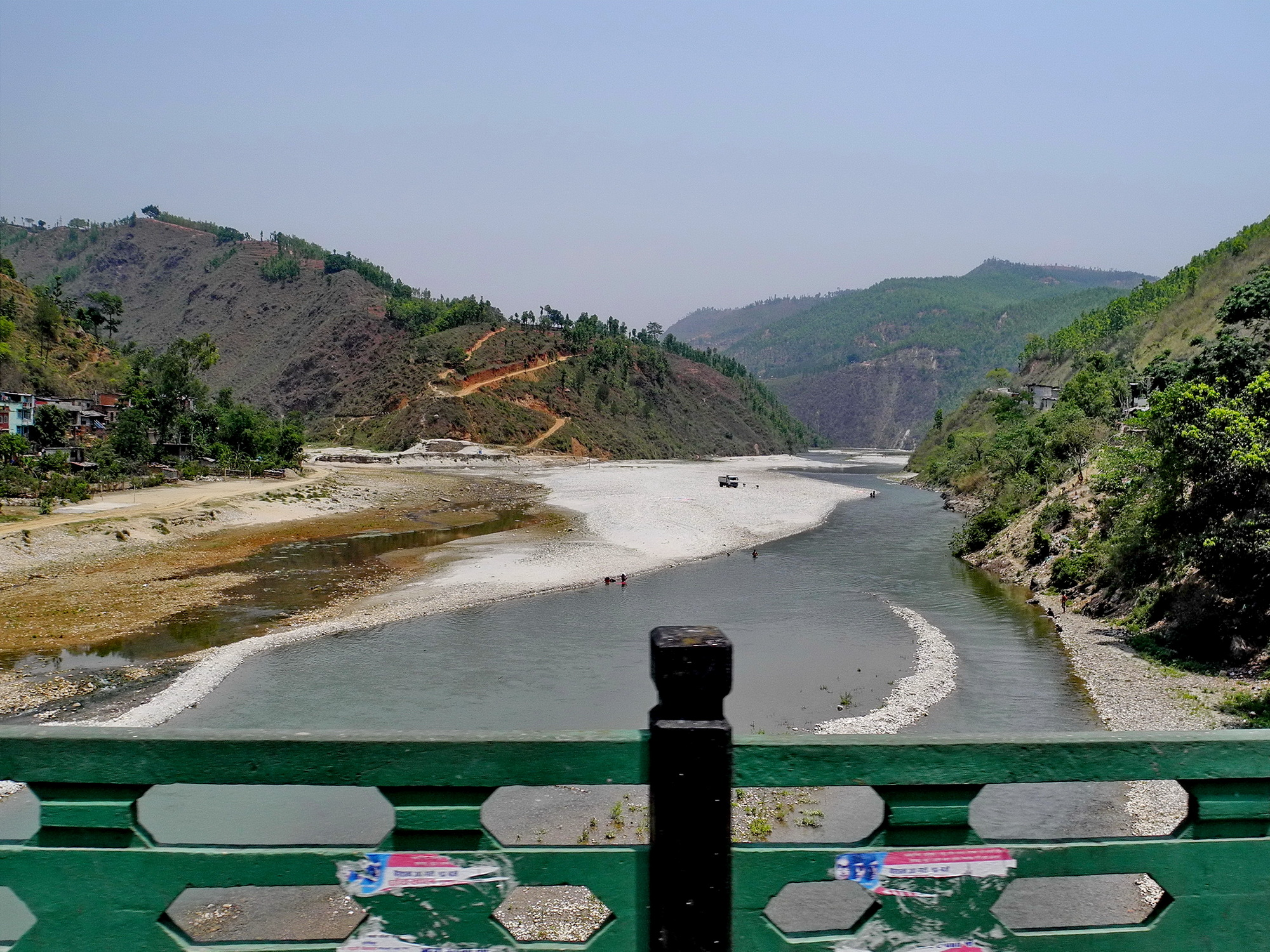
Dolaghbat on Bothé-Kosi river

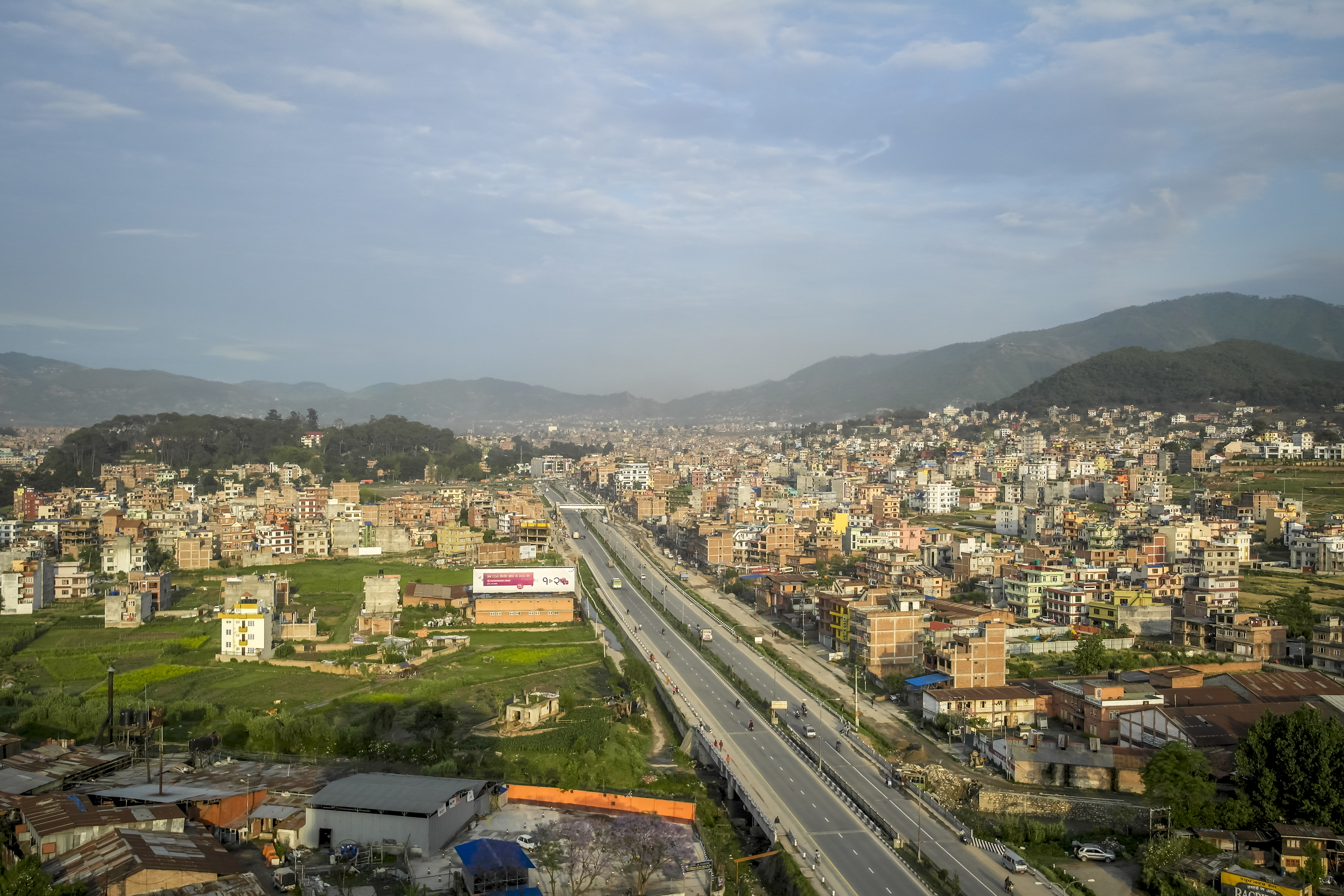
Araniko Highway as seen from Madhyapur, Thimi

== Significance ==
The Aarniko Rajmarg provides Nepal's overland link with China. However, it is of limited use as an alternative route for transport of goods, as it is cheaper to ship Chinese goods via Kolkata than to truck them through China's Tibet region. This situation is subject to change with major investment in road and rail on the Tibetan side.

== Closures ==
The route was closed by the April 2015 earthquakes, but was re-opened in early August 2015. The route sustained heavy damage because of landslides triggered by the earthquake.

In 2014 the highway was closed after landslides, but re-opened in September 2014. The landslide shut the route to Kathmandu for 46 days until a new alternate route could be built for Rs. 15.5 million. The landslides that closed it the summer of 2014 were called the Sunkoshi landslides, and the section of the highway near the Tibet border is especially prone to landslides.

== See also ==
- Friendship Highway (Tibet)
