= Zhangmu =

Border town in Tibet, China

Zhangmu 樟木镇 · འགྲམ
- Town
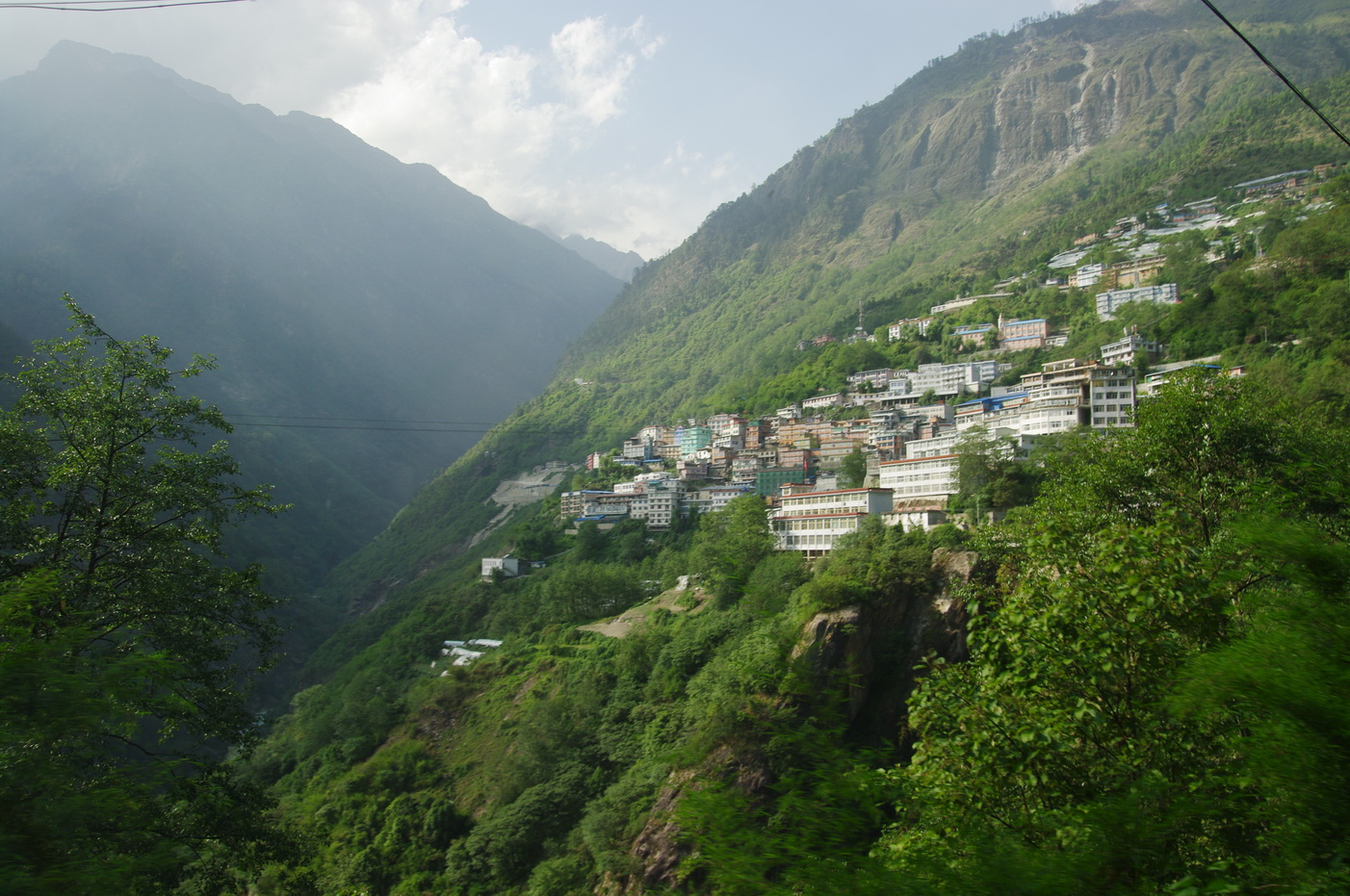
- View of Zhangmu

- Location within Tibet
- Coordinates (Zhangmu town government): 27°59′14″N 85°59′00″E
- Country: China
- Autonomous region: Tibet Autonomous Region
- Prefecture-level city: Shigatse
- County: Nyalam County
- Time zone: UTC+8 (China Standard Time)

Zhangmu

Chinese name
- Chinese: 樟木
Transcriptions
Standard Mandarin
- Hanyu Pinyin: Zhāngmù

Tibetan name
- Tibetan: འགྲམ།
Transcriptions
- Wylie: 'gram
- THL: Dram
- Tibetan Pinyin: Zham

Nepali name
- Nepali: खासा (Khasa)

Zhangmu (Chinese: 樟木), known in Tibetan as Dram (འགྲམ, Wylie: 'gram) and in Nepali as Khasa (खासा), is a town in Nyalam County, Shigatse, in the Tibet Autonomous Region of China. It is situated on the southern slope of the Himalayas close to the China–Nepal border, above the valley of the Poiqu, which becomes the Bhote Koshi in Nepal. Across the international boundary lies the Nepalese settlement of Kodari.

Zhangmu is the western terminus of China National Highway 318 (G318). The highway descends through the town to the Sino-Nepal Friendship Bridge, where it connects with Nepal's Araniko Highway. The international crossing there is formally designated the Zhangmu–Kodari border port; detailed coverage of the border facilities and their operation is included in the border port section of the Sino-Nepal Friendship Bridge article.

== Geography ==
Zhangmu occupies a steep, deeply incised Himalayan valley on the southern side of the Tibetan Plateau. The built-up area follows the mountainside and the winding course of G318, with little level ground. Chinese government sources have described the town's average elevation as approximately 2,200 to 2,300 m (7,200 to 7,500 ft) above sea level.

Because of its relatively low elevation and exposure to moist air from the south, Zhangmu has a much warmer and wetter environment than much of the Tibetan Plateau. Chinese sources describe its climate as humid and subtropical, with dense vegetation on the surrounding slopes.

The same topography also makes the town vulnerable to landslides, rockfalls and debris flows. Following the 2015 earthquake, authorities considered instability of the surrounding slopes sufficiently serious to order the complete evacuation of the town.

== Administration ==
Zhangmu is a town-level administrative division of Nyalam County. The Tibet Autonomous Region's 2026 administrative-division register lists Zhangmu Town under code 540235101 and identifies it as one of Nyalam County's two towns.

The town comprises four residents' committees: Zhangmu, Xuebugang, Lixin and Bang. Although the administrative town continues to exist, much of its resident population was resettled away from the original border settlement following the 2015 earthquake.

== History ==
=== Trans-Himalayan route ===
The valley through Zhangmu formed one of the traditional trade routes between Nepal and Tibet. A 2022 study of Himalayan trade networks identifies the Zhangmu route as running from Kathmandu through the Zhangmu valley to Nyalam and onward into Tibet. Together with the Gyirong route farther west, it was among the most frequently used and commercially important of the traditional Sino-Nepalese routes.

Newar merchants from the Kathmandu Valley were important participants in the historical Nepal–Tibet trade. The Kuti route, corresponding broadly to the modern Kodari–Zhangmu corridor, was one of the routes used by merchants travelling between Kathmandu and the Tibetan trading centres.

=== Modern road connection ===
The modern road connection between Kathmandu and the Chinese border was constructed with Chinese assistance during the 1960s. Nepal's Araniko Highway opened to traffic in May 1967. On the Chinese side, Zhangmu became the western terminus of G318, which runs eastwards through Shigatse and Lhasa and ultimately across China.

The resulting road corridor transformed Zhangmu into a major commercial border settlement. Before 2015, trade, transport, accommodation and services associated with the Nepal route formed a major part of the local economy.

=== 2015 earthquake and evacuation ===
The Gorkha earthquake of 25 April 2015 caused extensive damage in Zhangmu and the surrounding area. According to Xinhua, about 95 per cent of buildings in the town were leaning, cracked or otherwise damaged, while roads, water, electricity and communications were disrupted. Continuing aftershocks, rainfall and indications of unstable slopes increased concern over landslides and debris flows.

On 29 April 2015, authorities ordered a complete evacuation of Zhangmu. More than 4,250 residents, traders, workers and other people in the town were moved to temporary accommodation elsewhere in Shigatse, including an evacuation site in Lhatse County. The evacuation left the original settlement largely uninhabited for years while the border remained closed and geological risks were assessed.

The resident communities were subsequently resettled in a purpose-built development known as Zhangmu New Area in Samzhubzê District, Shigatse. An official 2018 report stated that residents from Zhangmu, Xuebugang, Lixin and Bang had moved there and that Zhangmu Town then comprised 514 households with 1,650 residents.

=== Reconstruction ===
Reconstruction initially concentrated on restoring the international road and border infrastructure. The 8.078 km (5.019 mi) section of G318 between Zhangmu and the Friendship Bridge was rebuilt and reopened on 17 May 2019. The reconstructed Friendship Bridge opened later that month.

Reconstruction of the town itself proceeded more slowly. In 2023, Shigatse authorities established a dedicated leadership group for Zhangmu's reconstruction, with plans to redevelop it as a modern border town while incorporating geological-hazard mitigation into the planning process. The Tibet Autonomous Region's 2024 government work programme called for high-standard reconstruction of Zhangmu, and the 2025 government report stated that full-scale reconstruction had begun during 2024.

By the end of 2025, the first phase of the Zhangmu town and port construction project was reported to be substantially complete. Reconstruction and further development remained under way in 2026.

== Transport ==
Zhangmu lies at the western end of China National Highway 318. From the higher Tibetan Plateau, G318 descends through Nyalam to Zhangmu and continues for approximately 8 km (5.0 mi) through the steep valley to the Sino-Nepal Friendship Bridge.

Across the bridge, the road becomes Nepal's Araniko Highway, which connects Kodari with Kathmandu. The formal international crossing is designated the Zhangmu–Kodari port under the 2012 China–Nepal agreement on border ports. Customs, immigration, bilateral trade and the detailed closure and reopening history of the crossing are covered at Sino-Nepal Friendship Bridge § Border port.

== Gallery ==
Zhangmu Port in 2025

Bhote Koshi River in Khasa (Zhangmu)

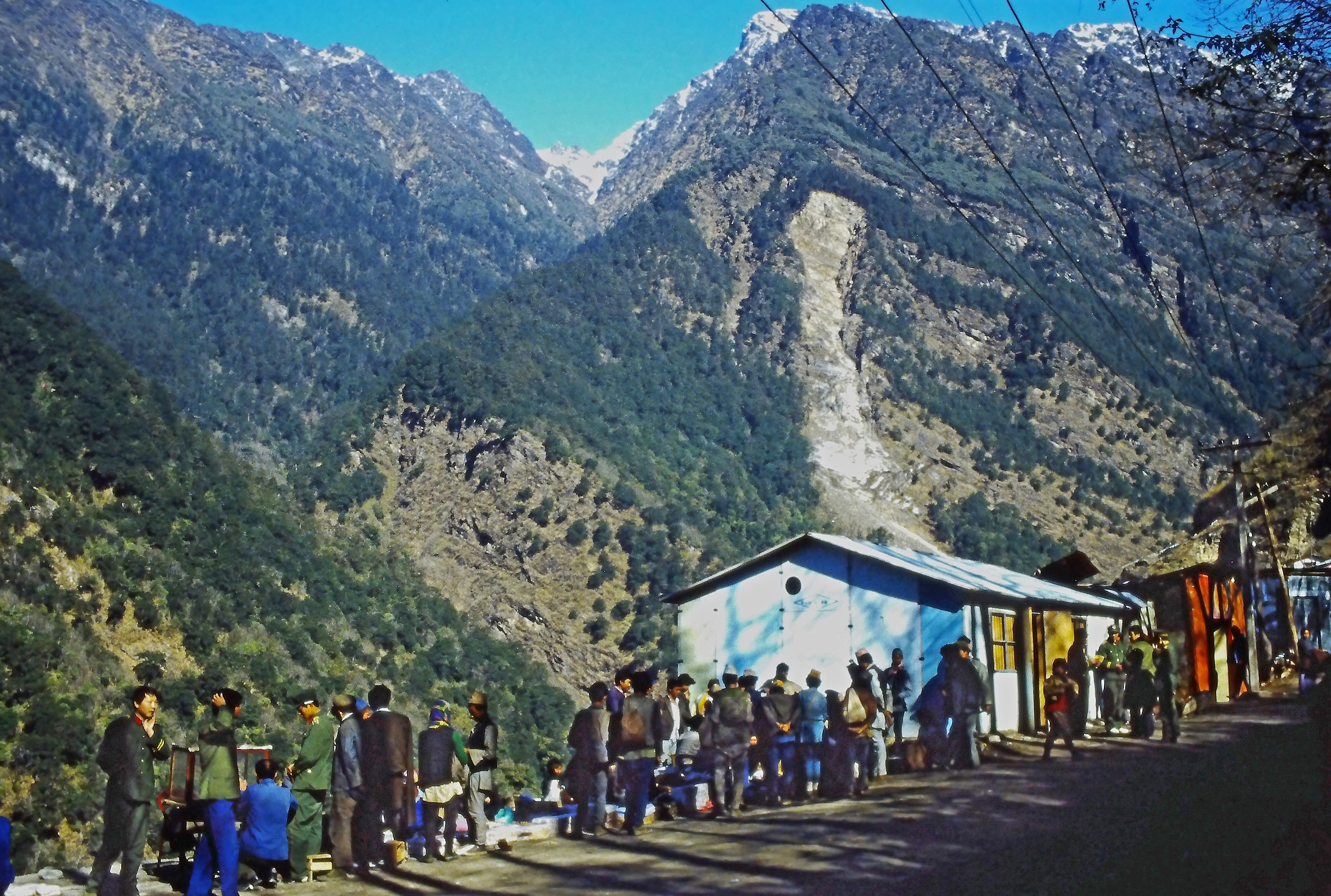
Zhangmu in 1987

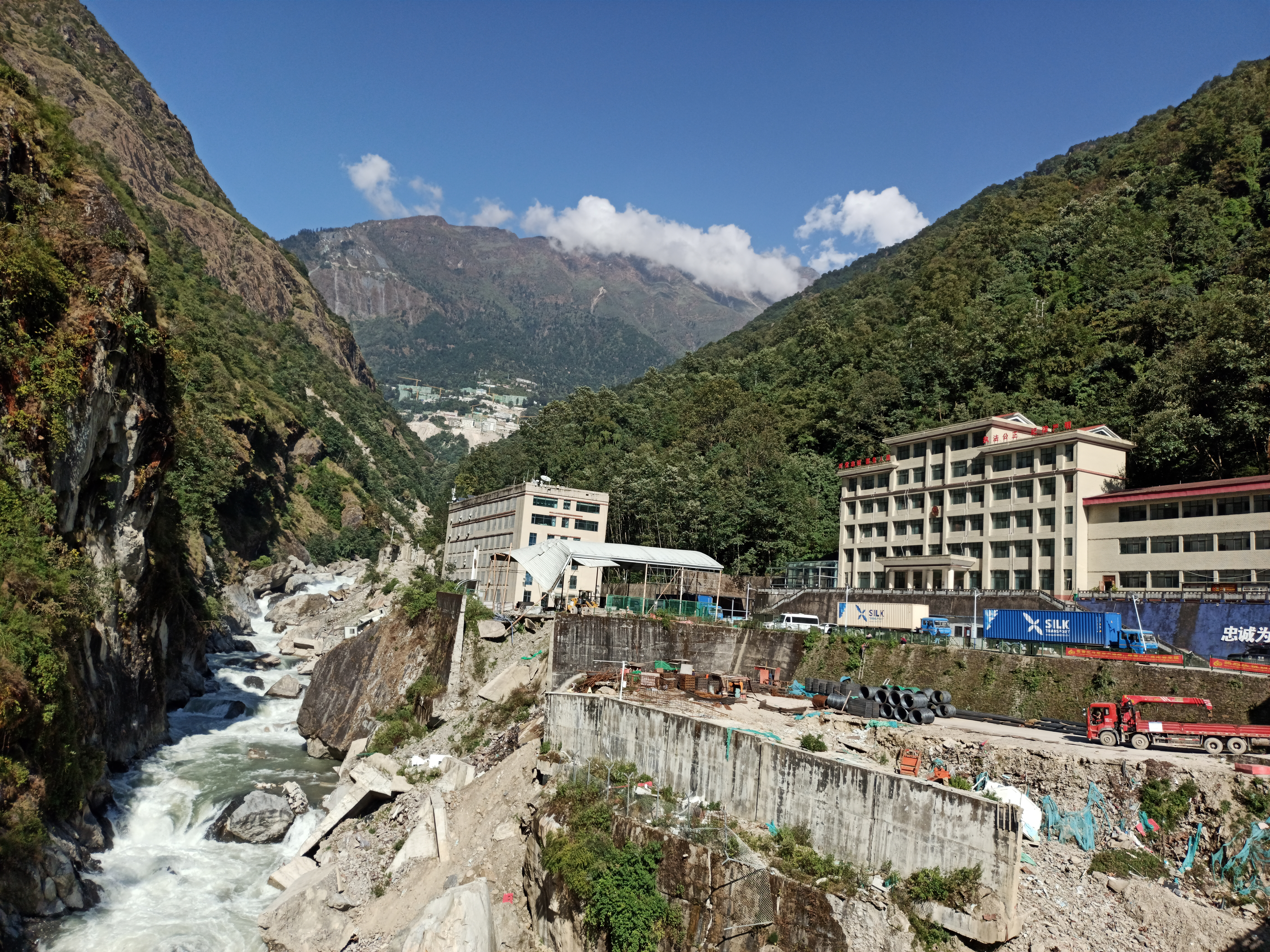
Zhangmu and the border area

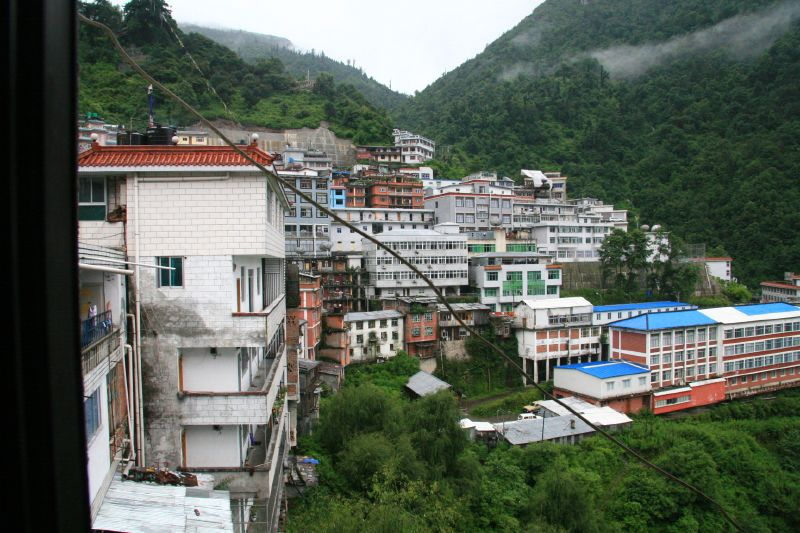
Buildings in Zhangmu

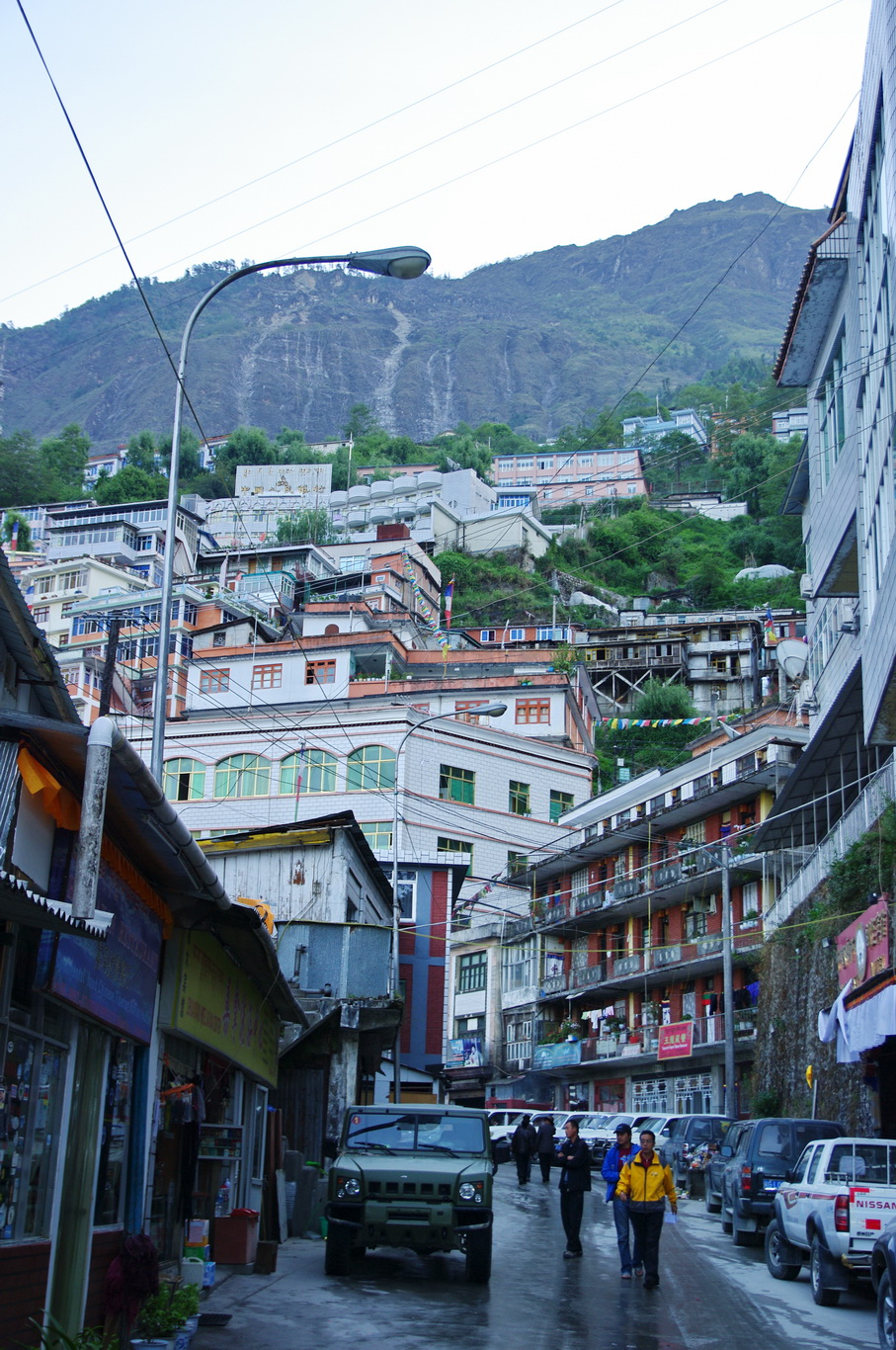
The main road through Zhangmu, part of China National Highway 318

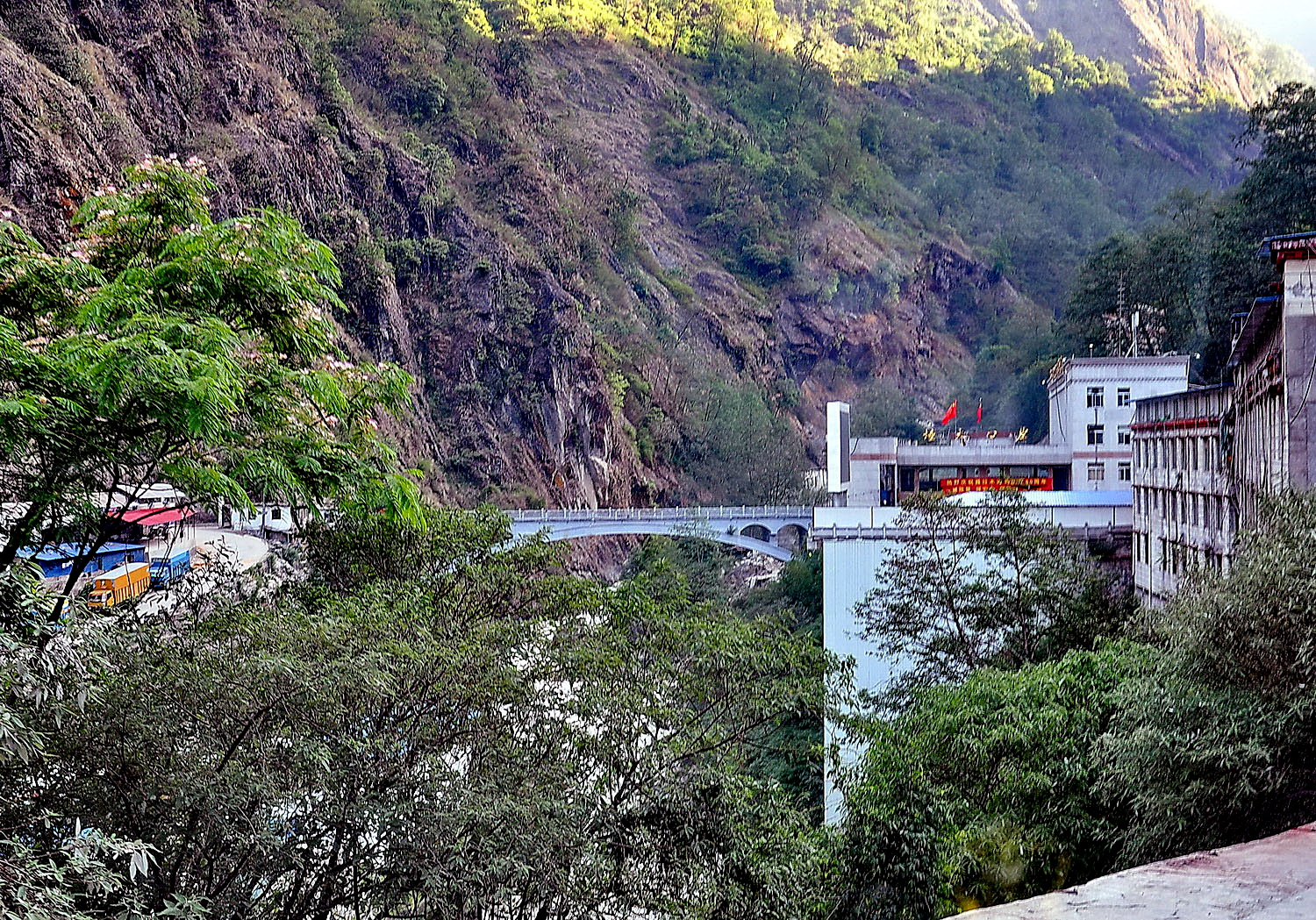
The former Sino-Nepal Friendship Bridge below Zhangmu, before its replacement

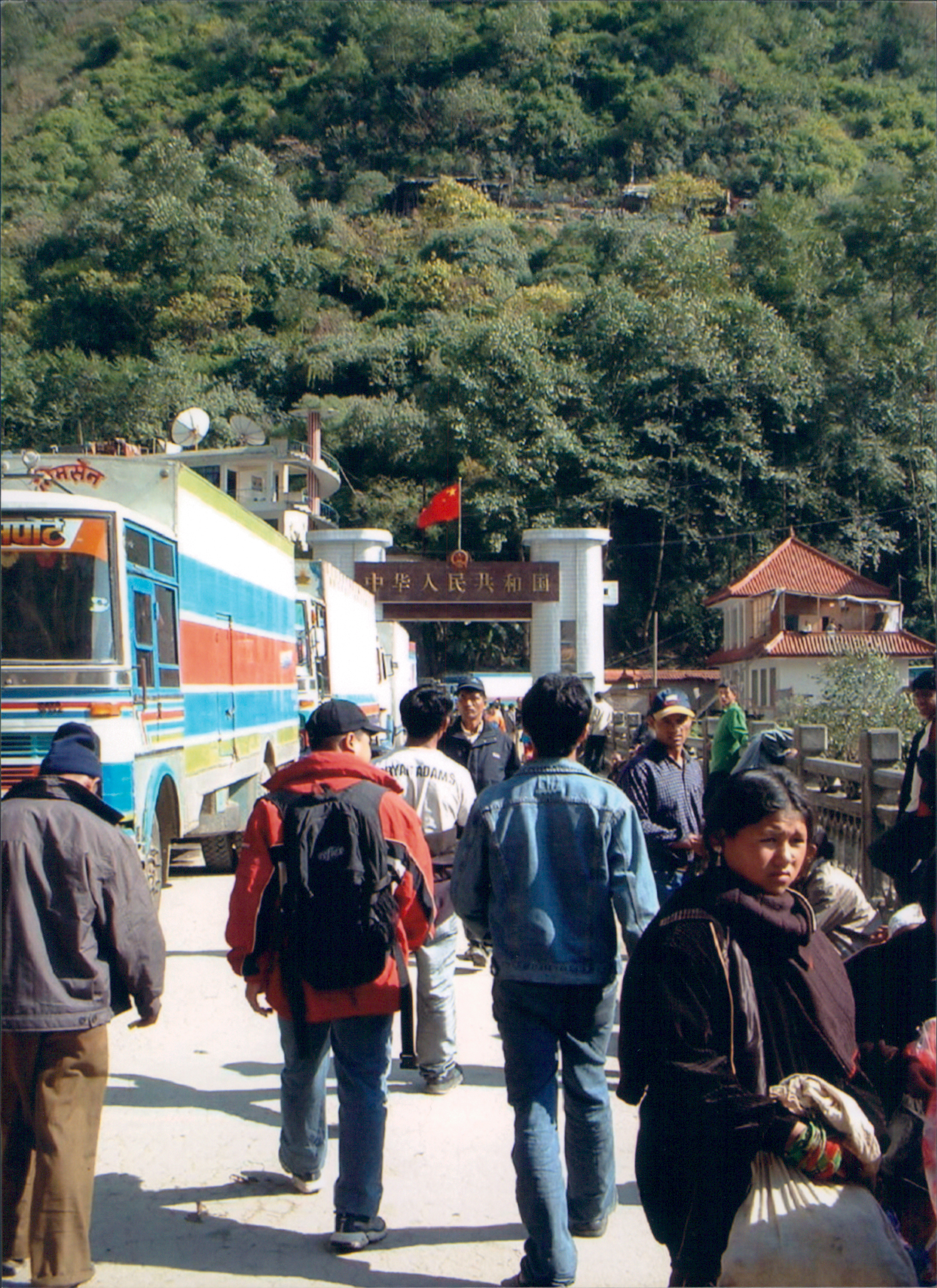
The former border gateway below Zhangmu

== See also ==
- Kodari
- Nyalam County
- Sino-Nepal Friendship Bridge
- List of towns in Tibet by elevation
