= Sino-Nepal Friendship Bridge =

Bridge linking Nepal and China

Sino-Nepal Friendship Bridge नेपाल-चीन मितेरी पुल
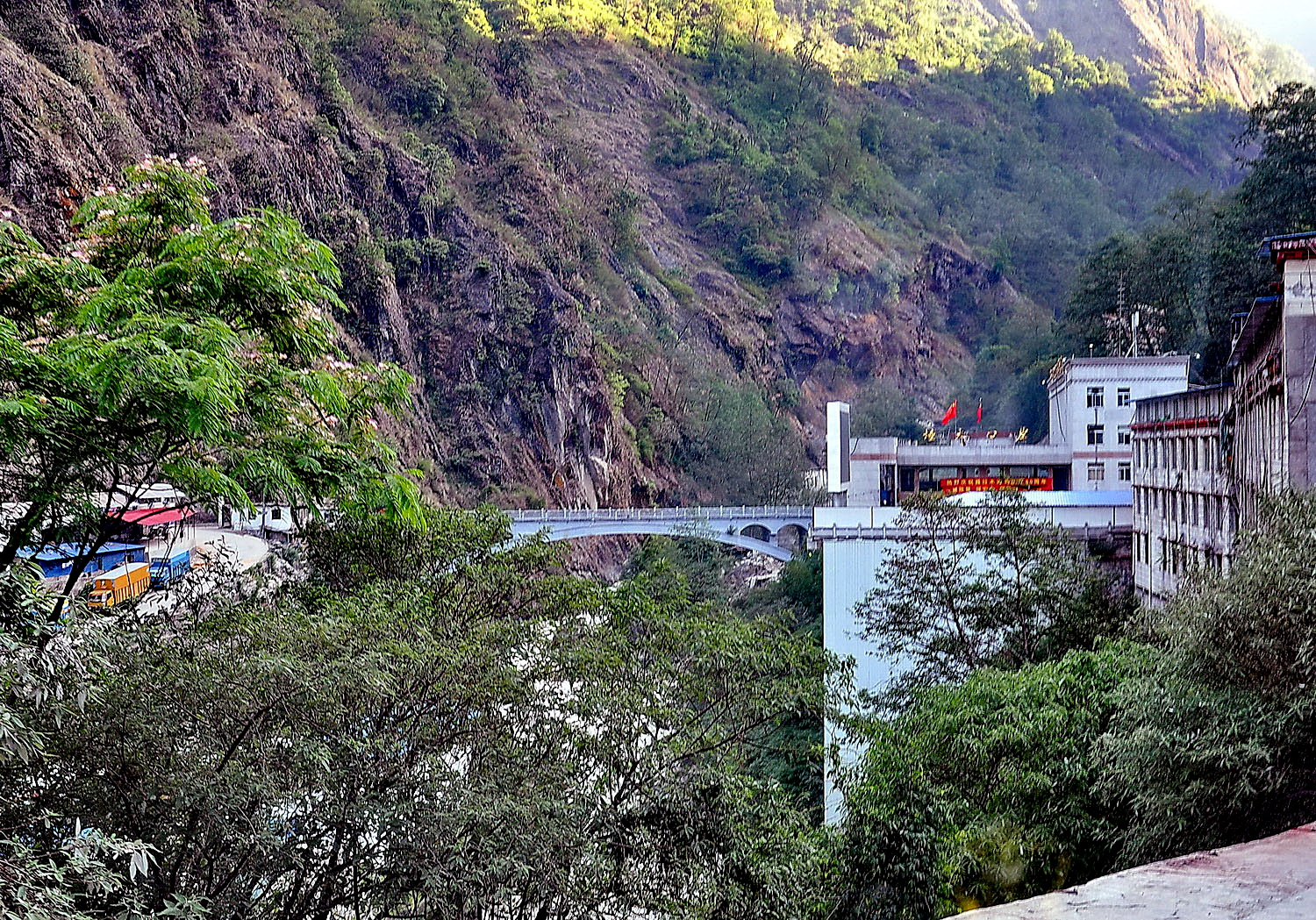
- The original bridge of Sino-Nepalese Friendship, damaged by the 2015 earthquake. Nepal is on the left, China on the right.
- Coordinates: 27.973413°N 85.964012°E
- Carries: Motor vehicles, pedestrians and bicycles
- Crosses: Bhote Koshi river
- Locale: Kodari, Sindhulpalchok District, Nepal; Zhangmu, Tibet Autonomous Region, China
- Official name: Sino-Nepal Friendship Bridge

Characteristics
- Design: Arc bridge (1964–2015); Girder bridge (from 2019)
- Material: Reinforced concrete
- Total length: 110 m (360 ft)
- Width: 8 m (26 ft)

History
- Construction start: 1962
- Opened: 1964
- Rebuilt: 2019

Location
- Interactive map of Sino-Nepal Friendship Bridge

The Sino-Nepal Friendship Bridge (Chinese: 中尼友谊桥; pinyin: Zhōng-Ní Yǒuyì Qiáo; Nepali: मितेरी पुल, romanized: Miterī Pula) is a bridge spanning the Bhote Koshi river (a tributary of Sun Koshi), linking Kodari in Sindhulpalchok District, Nepal, and Zhangmu, China.

== Description ==
Opened in 1964, the bridge was the only official border crossing between the two states until the 2010s. (Since then, the 1,850 m high Gyirong-Rasuwa border crossing and the 3,640 m high Burang-Yari border crossing have been opened.) Depending on the source, it is 1,760 m (5,770 ft), 1,800 m (5,900 ft), or 2,100 m (6,900 ft) above sea level.

The reinforced concrete arch bridge, with a prestressed concrete deck girder on top, was around 8 m (26 ft) wide and 45 m (148 ft) long.

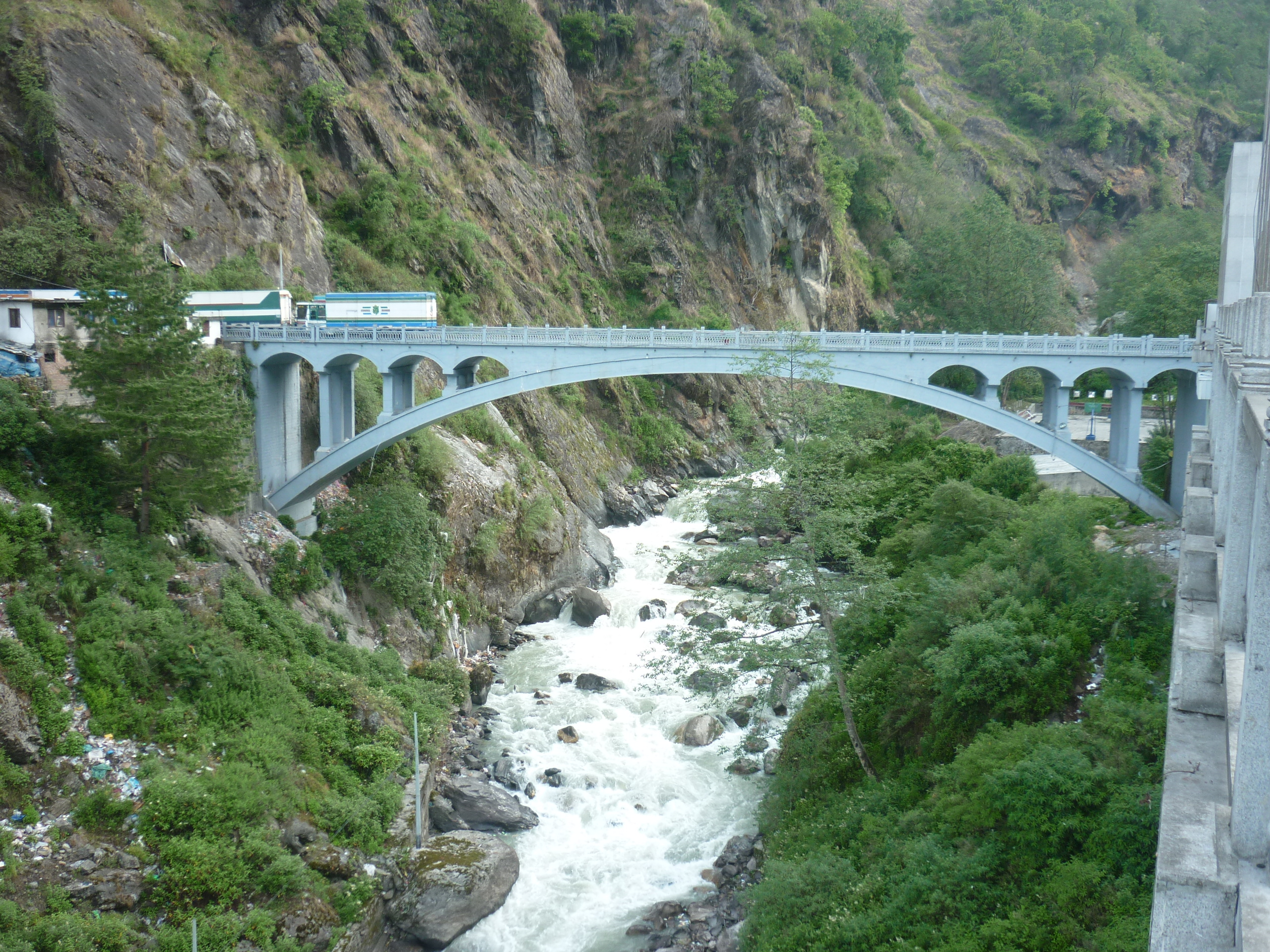
The original Friendship Bridge connecting China with Nepal before its demolition

It was badly damaged during the April 2015 earthquake and had to be demolished. The quakes closed the route and turned the border trading towns into ghost villages. In 2016, there were some repairs on the route, but trading had not been restored to previous levels. First, it was replaced by a temporary bridge. Chinese companies then built a new, reportedly 110 m (360 ft) long and significantly wider, twin-pier reinforced concrete girder bridge alongside it, which opened in June 2019.

The crossing was closed for multiple weeks in 2026 due to landslides.

== Transport connection ==
From the bridge on the Nepalese side, Kodari in Sindhulpalchok District, the road bridge is connected to the Araniko Highway, named after the famous architect Arniko, which leads to the capital, Kathmandu. On the Chinese side, the structure is also the end point of the Nepal-China Friendship Highway. This is part of National Road 318 and leads via Lhasa, the capital of the Tibet Autonomous Region, to Shanghai.

== Economic significance ==
The governments of both states have established a zone with legal and administrative facilitation for the entry and exchange of goods for the population living there within a radius of 30 km (19 mi) from the bridge. There is no visa requirement for this group of people. In addition, no customs duty is payable for a large number of goods manufactured in Nepal, especially for agricultural and handicraft products. From this, lively economic activity has developed in the vicinity of the bridge. Tibetan traders sell wool, salt, tea, and popular Tibetan medicinal products.

However, trade in goods of all kinds manufactured in other parts of China dominates. The goods arriving on trucks are usually unloaded in Zhangmu, the town closest to the bridge on the Chinese side, taken over the bridge, and loaded onto trucks from the destination country. This complex procedure is carried out for customs and other administrative reasons, and it is also due to the change in the side of the road (left-hand and right-hand traffic). In order to improve the sometimes chaotic processes on the Nepalese side, a new truck depot is being built with Chinese help near the town of Kodari.

Some of the goods are also offered for sale in the village itself. Many Tibetans rent the ground floor of their house to traders from other Chinese regions. Around 500 Nepalese cross the Friendship Bridge every day to sell their products or buy Chinese goods for their own use or for resale in their home country. In the opposite direction, around 250 Chinese cross the bridge every day.

Nepalese women carry the suitcases of package tourists entering China across the Sino-Nepalese Friendship Bridge.

In addition, numerous tourists cross the bridge, including mountaineers who want to climb Mount Everest from the Chinese side. Package tourists arriving from Kathmandu usually have to exit the bus in Nepal and walk across the bridge to continue with a Chinese company.

== See also ==
- List of international bridges
