= Kodari =

Kodari कोदारी
- Border village
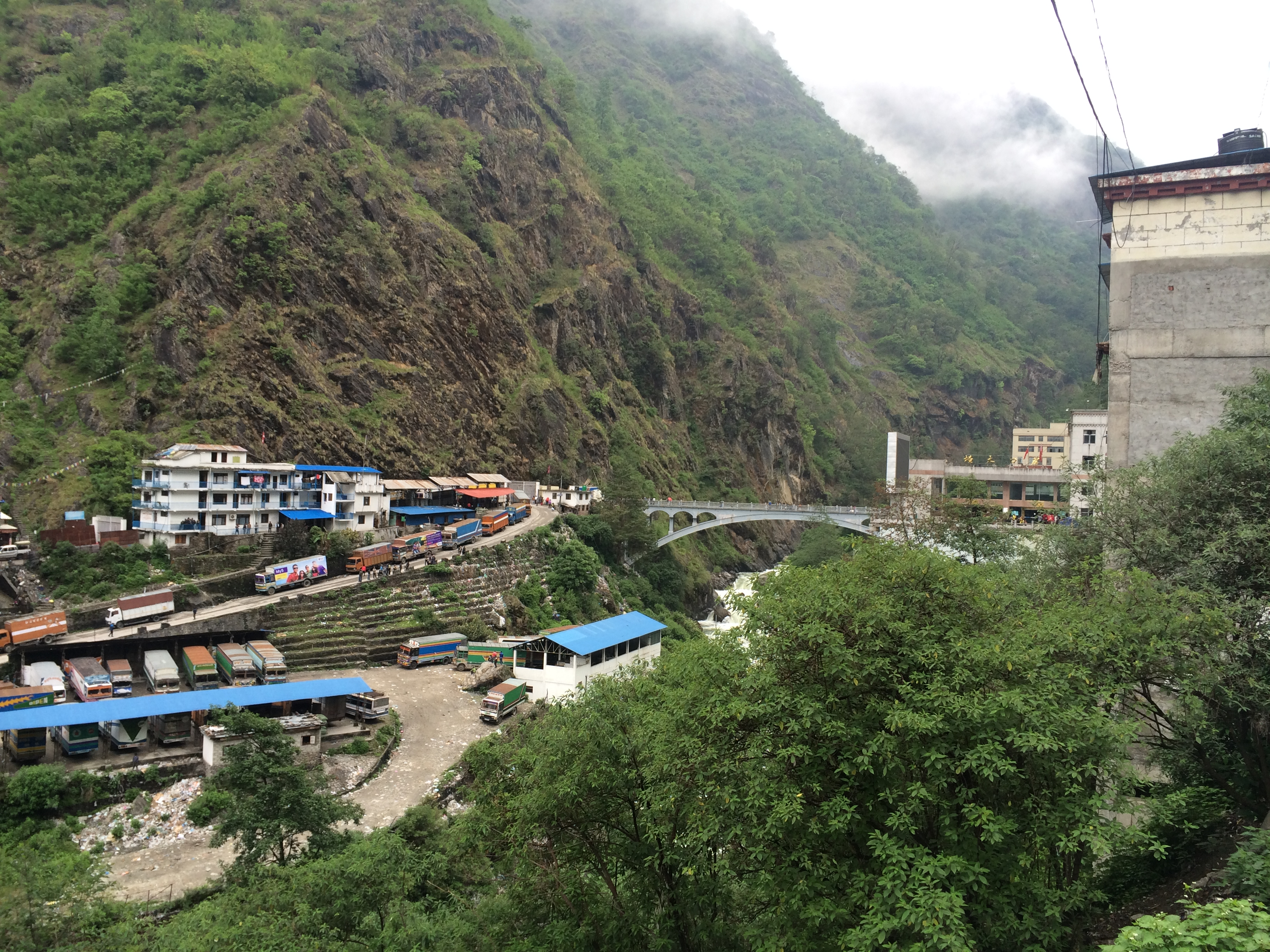
- Kodari viewed from the Chinese side of the border

- Location within Bagmati Province Location within Nepal
- Coordinates: 27.9735°N 85.9628°E
- Country: Nepal
- Province: Bagmati Province
- District: Sindhupalchok
- Rural municipality: Bhotekoshi
- Ward: No. 2
- Time zone: UTC+05:45 (Nepal Standard Time)

Kodari (कोदारी) is a border village in Ward No. 2 of Bhotekoshi Rural Municipality, Sindhupalchok District, Bagmati Province, Nepal. It lies in the upper valley of the Bhote Koshi immediately south of the China–Nepal border, opposite Zhangmu in Nyalam County, Shigatse, Tibet Autonomous Region, China.

Kodari is the northern terminus of Nepal's Araniko Highway (NH34). The road continues across the Sino-Nepal Friendship Bridge at the international border and connects with China National Highway 318 at Zhangmu. The international crossing associated with Kodari is formally the Zhangmu–Kodari border port and is commonly referred to in Nepal as the Tatopani border crossing.

== Geography ==
Kodari occupies part of the narrow and steep-sided Bhote Koshi valley near Nepal's northern frontier. The surrounding terrain is highly susceptible to landslides, rockfalls, river erosion and road subsidence, particularly during the monsoon.

The official description of Bhotekoshi Rural Municipality gives the territory of the former Tatopani Village Development Committee, of which Kodari formed part, an elevation range of approximately 1,300 to 4,600 m (4,300 to 15,100 ft). This range refers to the wider former administrative area rather than to the elevation of Kodari itself.

== Administration ==
Kodari was formerly part of Tatopani Village Development Committee. Following Nepal's restructuring of local government in 2017, Tatopani was incorporated into the newly formed Bhotekoshi Rural Municipality together with the former Listikot, Phulpingkatti and Marming VDCs.

The former Tatopani VDC was divided between two wards of the new rural municipality. Its former wards 1–4 became Bhotekoshi Ward No. 2, while former wards 5–9 became Ward No. 3. Kodari is in Ward No. 2.

== History ==
Kodari lies on the historic Kuti route between Nepal and Tibet. Together with the Kyirong route farther west, it was one of the principal trans-Himalayan routes connecting Nepal with the Tibetan Plateau. The Kuti route corresponds broadly to the modern Araniko Highway corridor and crosses the present border at Kodari and Zhangmu (Dram). Newar merchants were among the communities historically engaged in trade between the Kathmandu Valley and Tibet along the trans-Himalayan routes.

A modern motor road between Kathmandu and Kodari was constructed with Chinese assistance in the 1960s. Construction began in 1963 and the road officially opened in 1967. The road became known as the Araniko Highway, after the medieval Nepalese artist and architect Araniko. Nepal's Department of Roads now classifies the Kathmandu–Dhulikhel–Dolalghat–Khadichaur–Kodari route as National Highway 34 (NH34), with a total listed length of approximately 112 km (70 mi).

The Gorkha earthquake of 25 April 2015 and its aftershocks caused extensive damage in and around Kodari. Engineering reconnaissance after the earthquake documented large rockfalls striking the settlement and widespread landslide and rockfall damage along the highway leading to the Chinese border. The disaster also closed the international crossing, severely affecting transport and commerce in the border settlements. The border facilities and road crossing were subsequently rebuilt.

Landslides and road subsidence have continued to affect Kodari. In 2021, sections of the highway near the village collapsed following monsoon rains, threatening settlements in Upper Kodari and nearby areas. In July 2026, landsliding and road subsidence again blocked the highway at Kodari in Bhotekoshi Ward No. 2; a temporary track restored limited traffic in August after about 40 days of disruption.

== Transport ==
Kodari is reached from Kathmandu by the Araniko Highway, designated NH34. Within Sindhupalchok District, the Department of Roads divides the route into the Dolalghat–Lamosangu, Lamosangu–Barabise and Barabise–Kodari sections; the final Barabise–Kodari section is 27 km (17 mi) long.

At the northern end of Kodari, the highway reaches the Sino-Nepal Friendship Bridge across the Bhote Koshi. The bridge connects Nepal with Zhangmu on the Chinese side, where the road joins China National Highway 318. The bridge also carries the international Zhangmu–Kodari border crossing.

The border crossing and its customs, immigration, trade and reconstruction history are covered in the border port section of the Sino-Nepal Friendship Bridge article.

== Gallery ==
Kodari

Kodari in 2025

Chanies Container in Kodari

Kodari

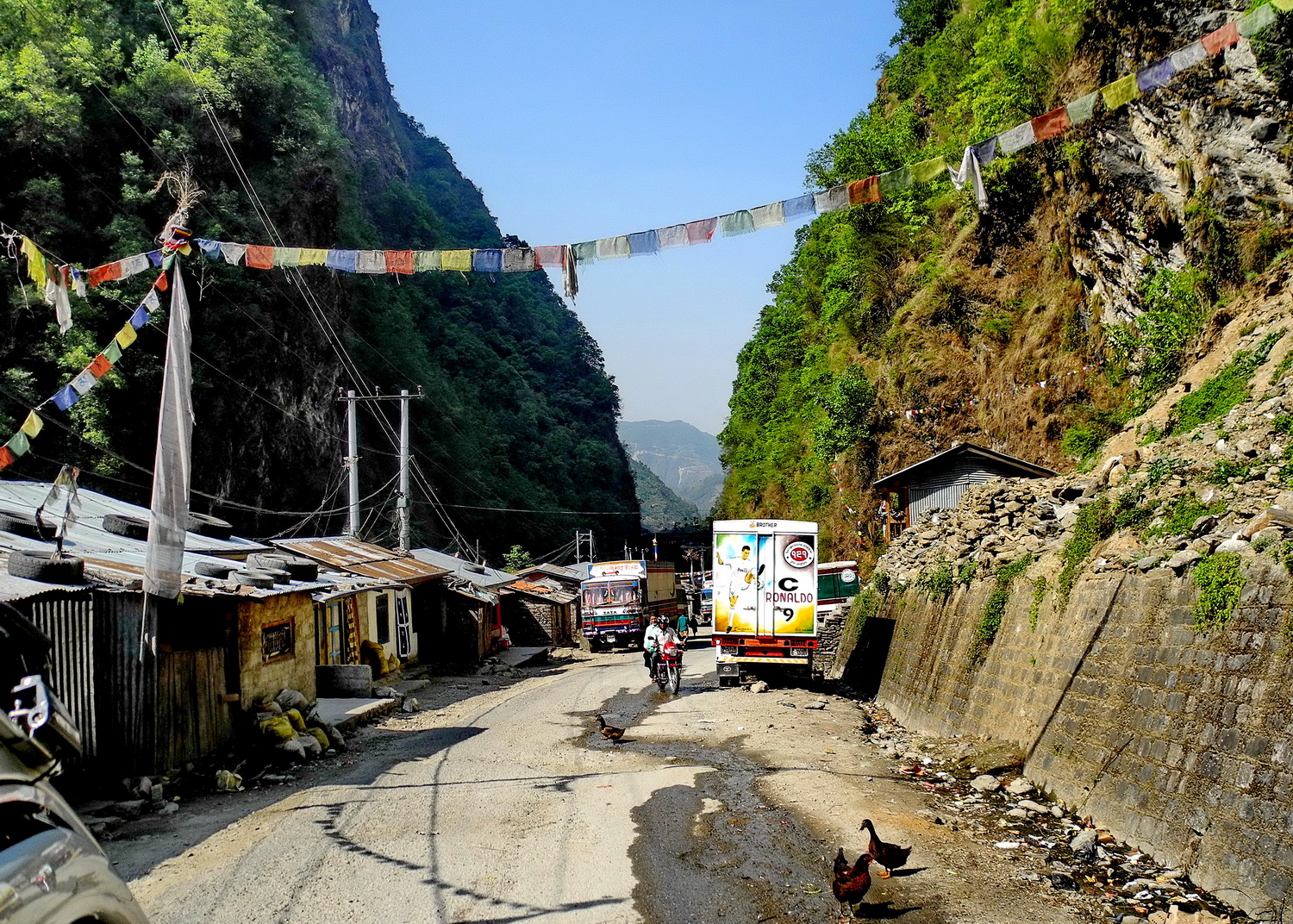
The Araniko Highway at Kodari near the Chinese border

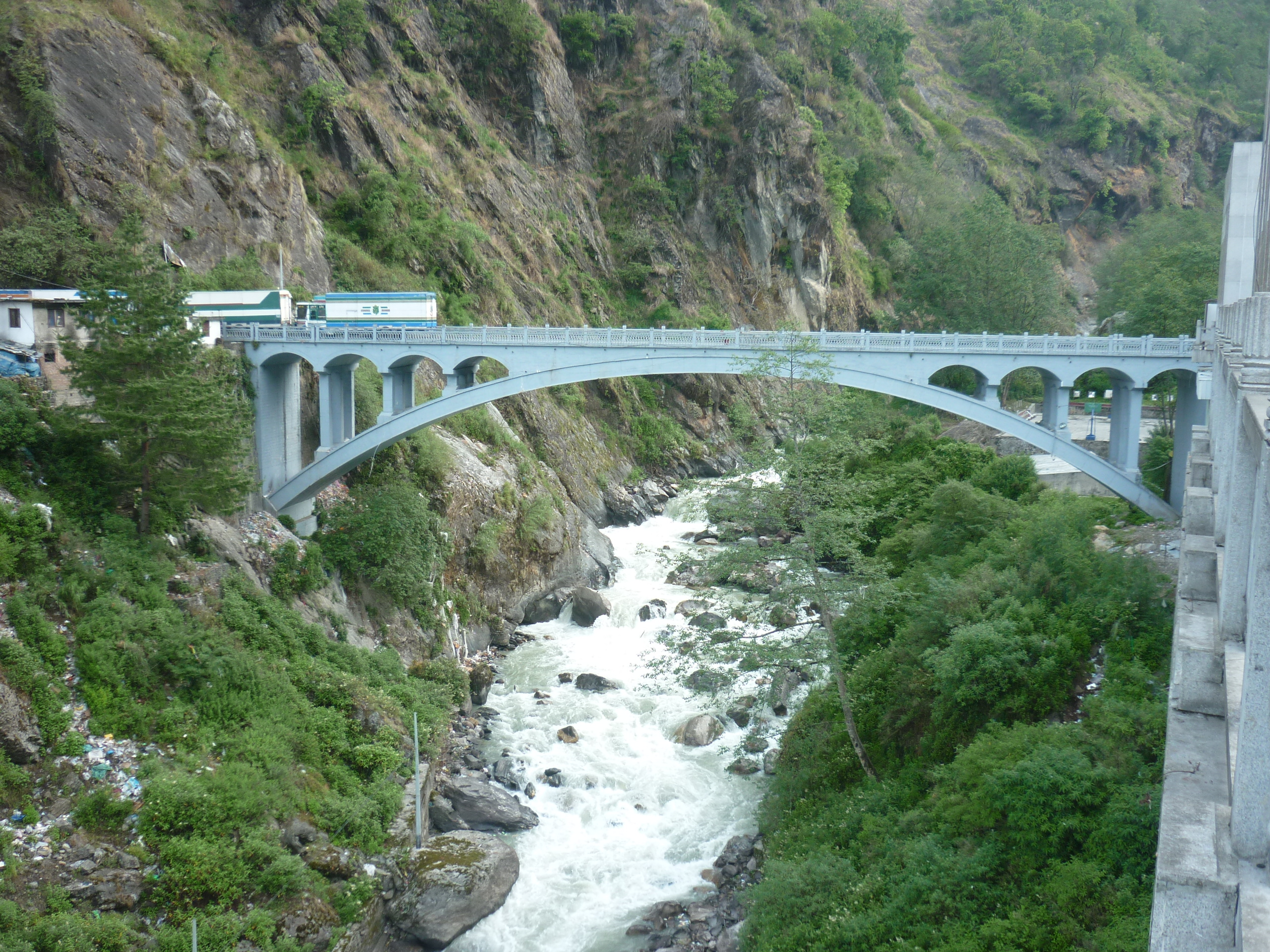
The former Sino-Nepal Friendship Bridge, with Nepal on the left and China on the right across the Bhote Koshi

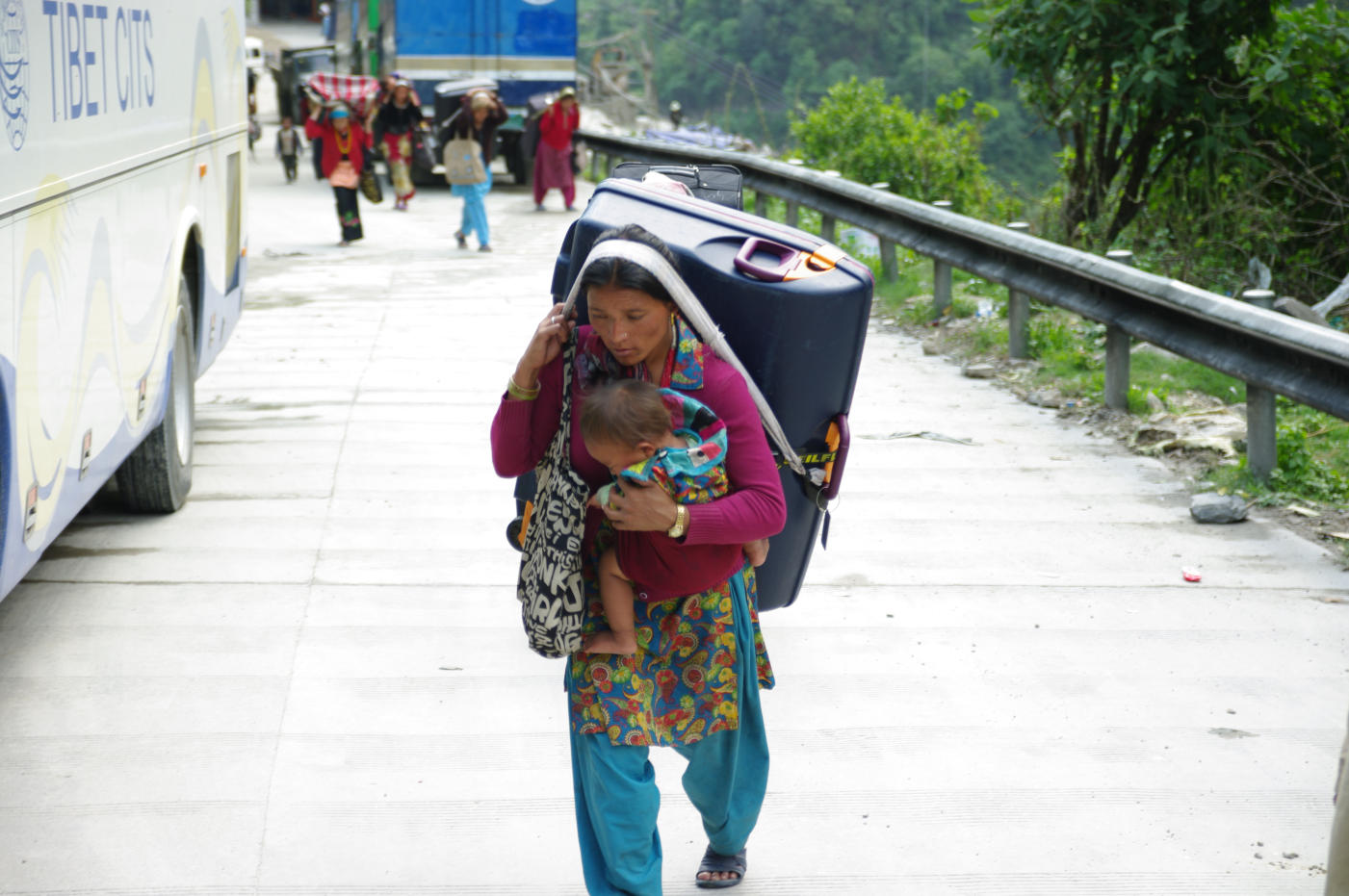
Porters carrying luggage across the former Friendship Bridge

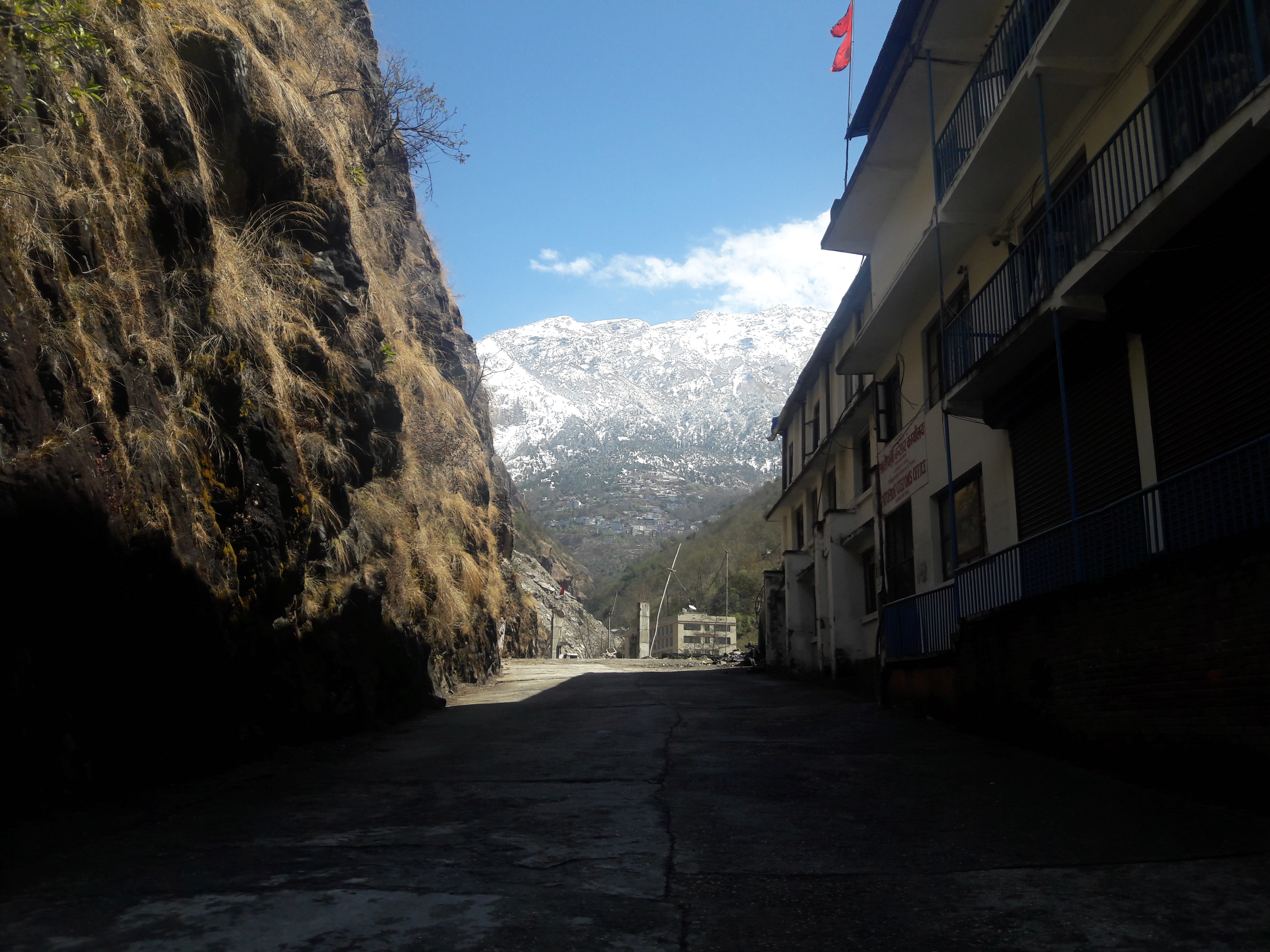
Border facilities near Kodari, with Zhangmu on the opposite slope

== See also ==
- Bhotekoshi Rural Municipality
- China–Nepal border
- Sino-Nepal Friendship Bridge
- Zhangmu
