= Lhaze =

Lhaze may refer to:

- Lhazê County, county in Tibet
- Lhazê (village), village in Tibet
