= Potala Palace =

Fortress in Lhasa, Tibet

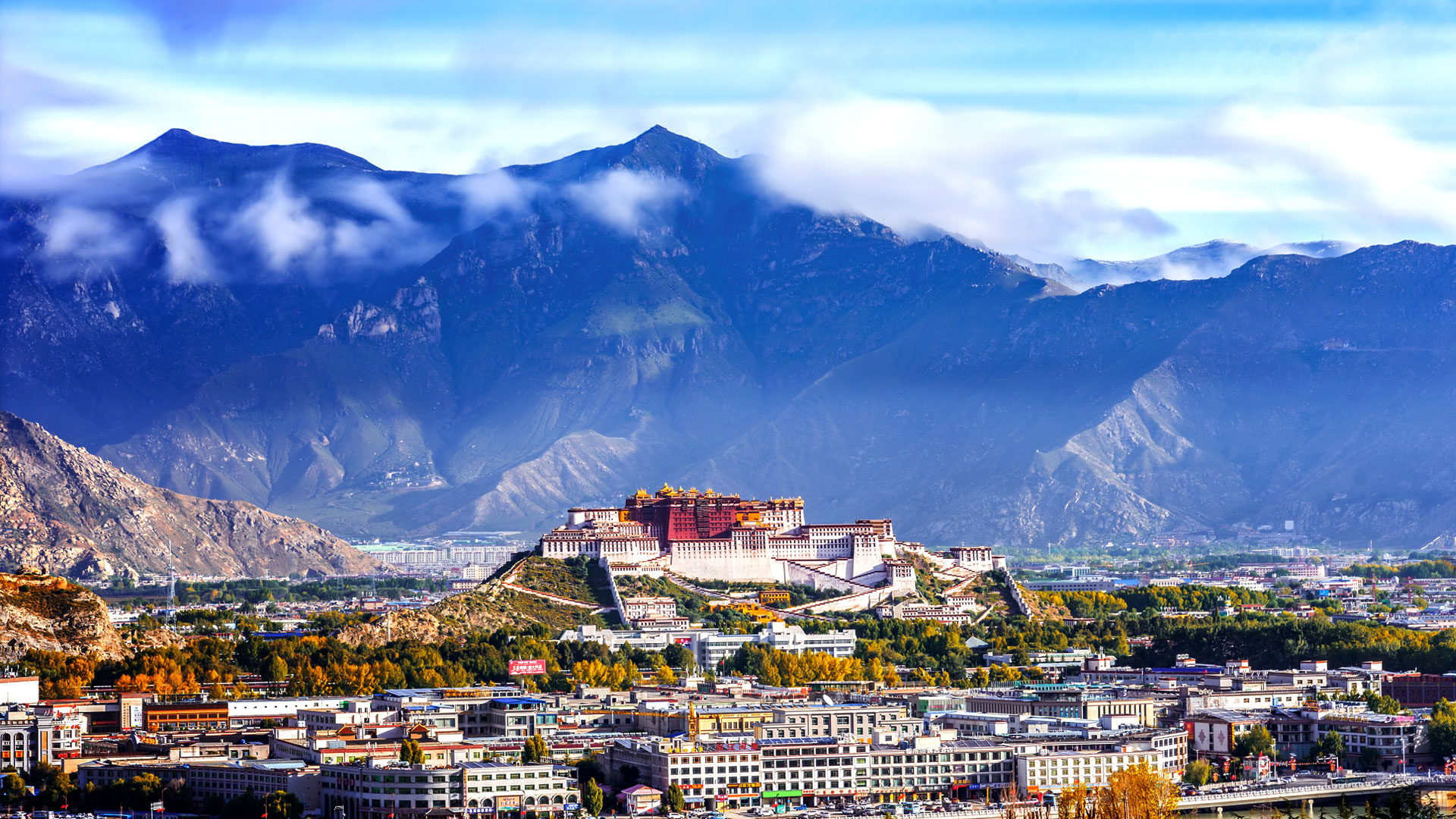

- Location within Tibet Autonomous Region

Religion
- Affiliation: Tibetan Buddhism
- Leadership: 14th Dalai Lama

Location
- Location: Lhasa, Tibet Autonomous Region, China
- Coordinates: 29°39′28″N 91°07′01″E

Architecture
- Founder: Songtsen Gampo
- Established: 1649; 377 years ago

Website
- www.potalapalace.cn

UNESCO World Heritage Site
- Official name: Historic Ensemble of the Potala Palace, Lhasa
- Type: Cultural
- Criteria: i, iv, vi
- Designated: 1994 (18th session)
- Reference no.: 707
- Region: Asia-Pacific
- Extensions: 2000; 2001

Potala Palace (Tibetan: ཕོ་བྲང་པོ་ཏ་ལ་, Wylie: pho brang po ta la; simplified Chinese: 布达拉宫; traditional Chinese: 布達拉宮; pinyin: Bùdálā Gōng) is a museum complex in Lhasa, the capital of the Tibet Autonomous Region (Note: The region is variously known in English as Tibet, in Tibetan as Bod (བོད་), and in Chinese as Xīzàng (西藏). For details on these names and their usage, see Etymology of Tibet.) of China. It was formerly the winter palace of the Dalai Lamas, and from 1649 until 1959 served as the Dalai Lamas' residence. The palace complex became a museum following the annexation of Tibet by the People's Republic of China.

The palace is named after Mount Potalaka, regarded in Buddhist tradition as the mythical abode of the bodhisattva Avalokiteśvara. Construction of the present structure was begun in 1645 at the order of the 5th Dalai Lama, advised by Konchog Chophel, the Thirty-fifth Ganden Tripa of the Gelug school. It was built on the site of an earlier palace attributed to Songtsen Gampo (traditionally dated to 637).

Built in the dzong style, at an altitude of about 3,700 metres (12,100 ft) on Marpo Ri in the center of the Lhasa Valley, the palace measures 400 metres (1,300 ft) east–west and 350 metres (1,150 ft) north–south. Its sloping stone walls average 3 metres (9.8 ft) thick, 5 metres (16 ft) at the base, with copper poured into the foundations for earthquake protection. Rising 13 stories, the complex contains more than 1,000 rooms, 10,000 shrines, and some 200,000 statues, reaching a height of 119 metres (390 ft) above the mountain and over 300 metres (980 ft) above the valley floor.

== History ==
=== Context ===
Potala Palace
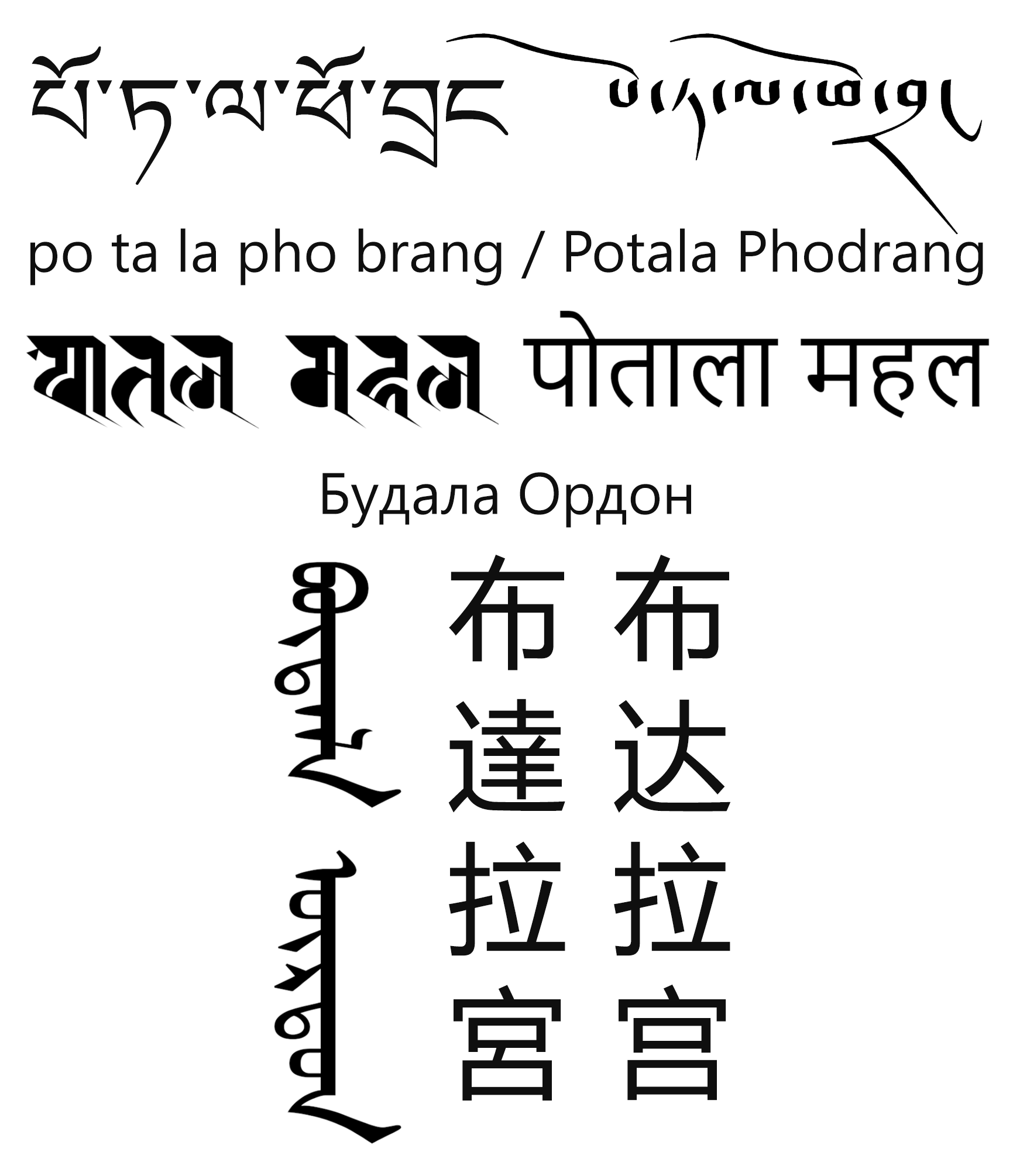
- Tibetan Uchen and Umê scripts Wylie transliteration of Tibetan / Latinized Tibetan Lantsa and Devanagari scripts Mongol Cyrillic script traditional Mongol script, traditional Chinese, simplified Chinese

The Potala is built on the site of palace Songtsen Gampo on the Red Hill. The Potala contains two chapels on its northwest corner that conserve parts of the earlier palace. One is the Phakpa Lhakhang, the other the Chogyel Drupuk, a recessed cavern identified as Songtsen Gampo's meditation cave. Ngawang Lozang Gyatso, the Great Fifth Dalai Lama, started the construction of the modern Potala Palace in 1645, (Note: Tibetan calendar: (ja) bird^{th} (shing) wood^{th} of the (chu chik) 11th (rab byung) 60-years cycle. Nyatri Tsengpo/Royal Year (if calculated by 100 year cycle): 1645-127 is anno domini: 1518) after one of his spiritual advisers, Konchog Chophel, pointed out that the site was ideal as a seat of government, situated as it is between Drepung and Sera monasteries and the old city of Lhasa.

The external structure was built in 3 years, while the interior, together with its furnishings, took 45 years to complete.

=== Inhabitation ===
The new palace got its name from a hill on Cape Comorin at the southern tip of India—a rocky point sacred to the bodhisattva of compassion, who is known as Avalokitesvara, or Chenrezi. (Note: Tradition has it that the three main hills of Lhasa represent the "Three Protectors of Tibet". Chokpori, just to the south of the Potala, is the soul-mountain (Wylie: bla ri) of Vajrapani, Pongwari that of Manjusri, and Marpo Ri, the hill on which the Potala stands, represents Avalokiteśvara.)

The Dalai Lama and his government moved into the Potrang Karpo ('White Palace') in 1649. The Potala was used as a winter palace by the Dalai Lama from that time. Construction lasted until 1694, some twelve years after his death. The Potrang Marpo ('Red Palace') was added between 1690 and 1694. Kalachakra Mandala was constructed during the 1690s.

The Yamantaka Mandala was made during 1751.

=== Modern ===
The lower white frontage on the south side of the palace was used to hoist two gigantic thangkas joined representing the figures of Tara and Sakyamuni during the Sertreng Festival on the 30th day of the second Tibetan month.

Amongst at least one group of Tibetans c. 1950 the "Potala" is known colloquially as "Peak Potala" (Tse Potala), or most commonly as "the Peak".

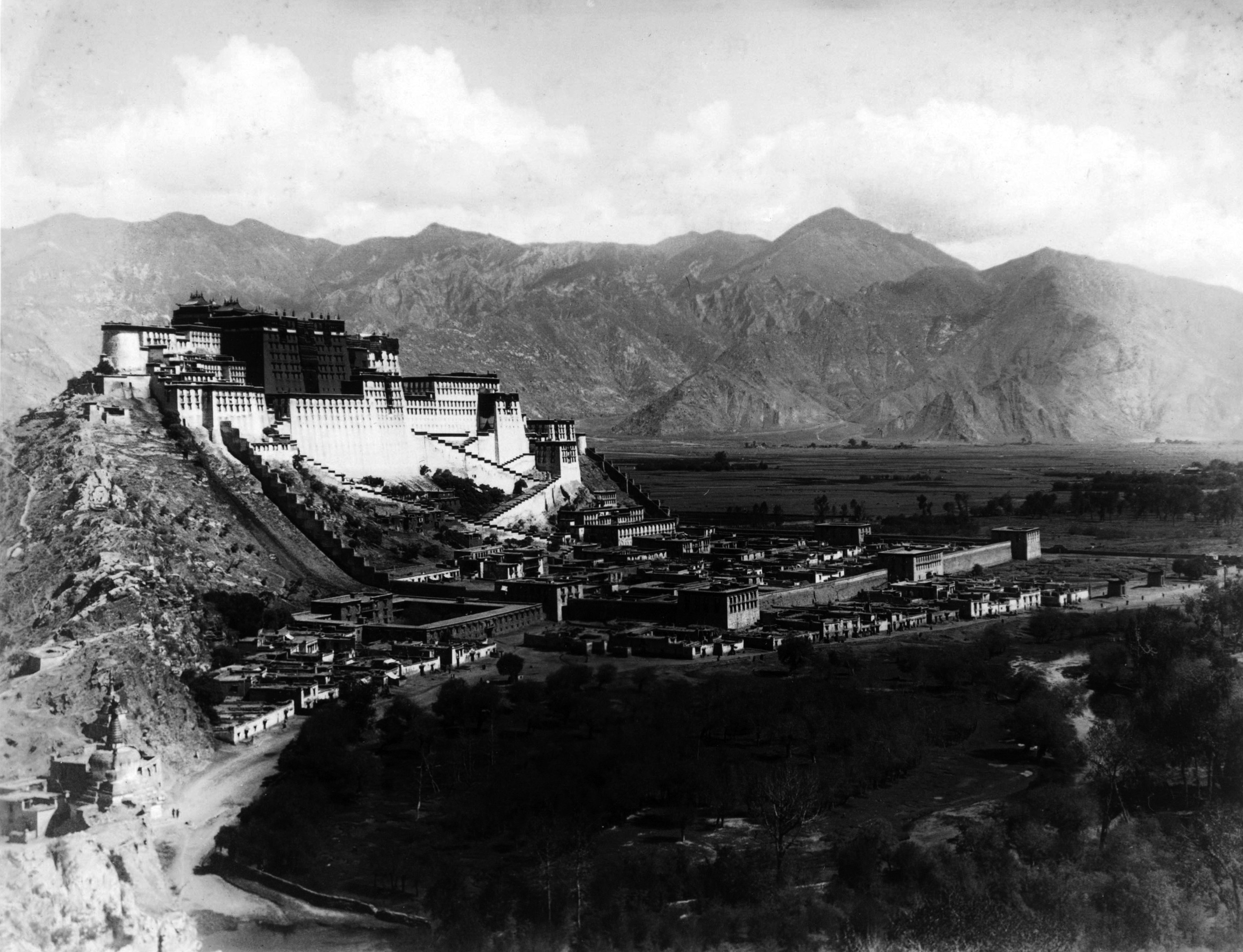
Potala Palace in the 1920s

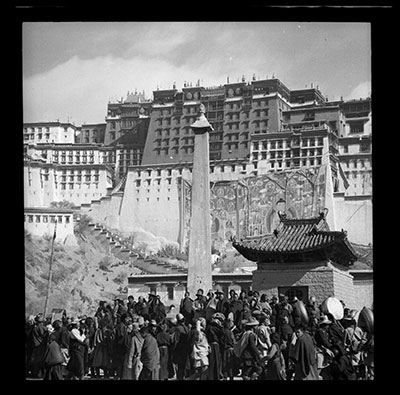
The Sertreng ceremony on 28 April 1949 with thangkas on the front of the palace

=== Under the People's Republic of China ===
The palace was damaged during the Tibetan uprising against the Chinese in 1959, when Chinese shells were launched into the palace's windows. (Note: Before Chamdo Jampa Kalden was shot and taken prisoner by soldiers of the People's Liberation Army, he witnessed "Chinese cannon shells began landing on Norbulingka past midnight on 19 March 1959... The sky lit up as the Chinese shells hit the Chakpori Medical College and the Potala.") It escaped damage during the Cultural Revolution in 1966 through the personal intervention of Zhou Enlai, who was then the Premier of the People's Republic of China. According to Tibetan historian Tsering Woeser, the palace, which harboured "over 100,000 volumes of scriptures and historical documents" and "many store rooms for housing precious objects, handicrafts, paintings, wall hangings, statues, and ancient armour", "was almost robbed empty".

The Potala Palace was inscribed to the UNESCO World Heritage List in 1994.

Rapid modernisation has been a concern for UNESCO, however, which expressed concern over the building of modern structures immediately around the palace which threaten the palace's unique atmosphere. The Chinese government responded by enacting a rule barring the building of any structure taller than 21 metres in the area. UNESCO was also concerned over the materials used during the restoration of the palace, which commenced in 2002 at a cost of RMB180 million (US$22.5 million), although the palace's director, Qiangba Gesang, has clarified that only traditional materials and craftsmanship were used. The palace has also received restoration works between 1989 and 1994, costing RMB55 million (US$6.875 million).

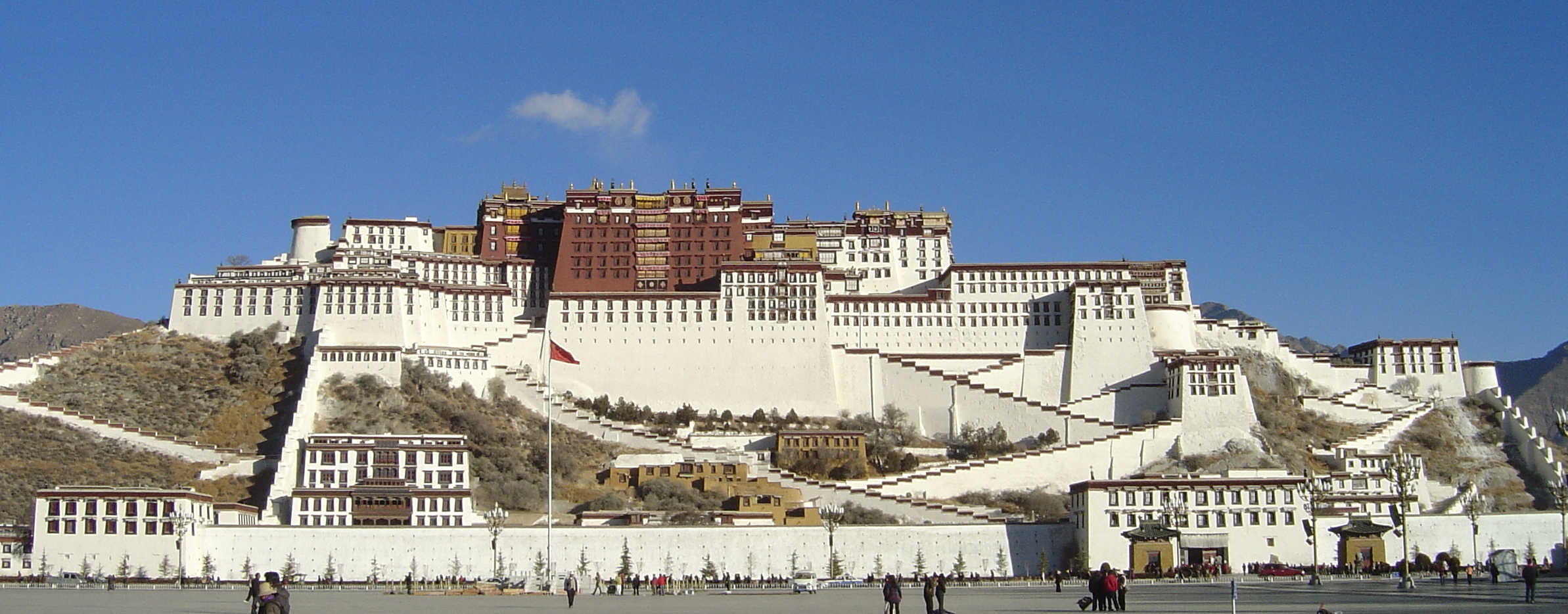
The Potala Palace in 2008

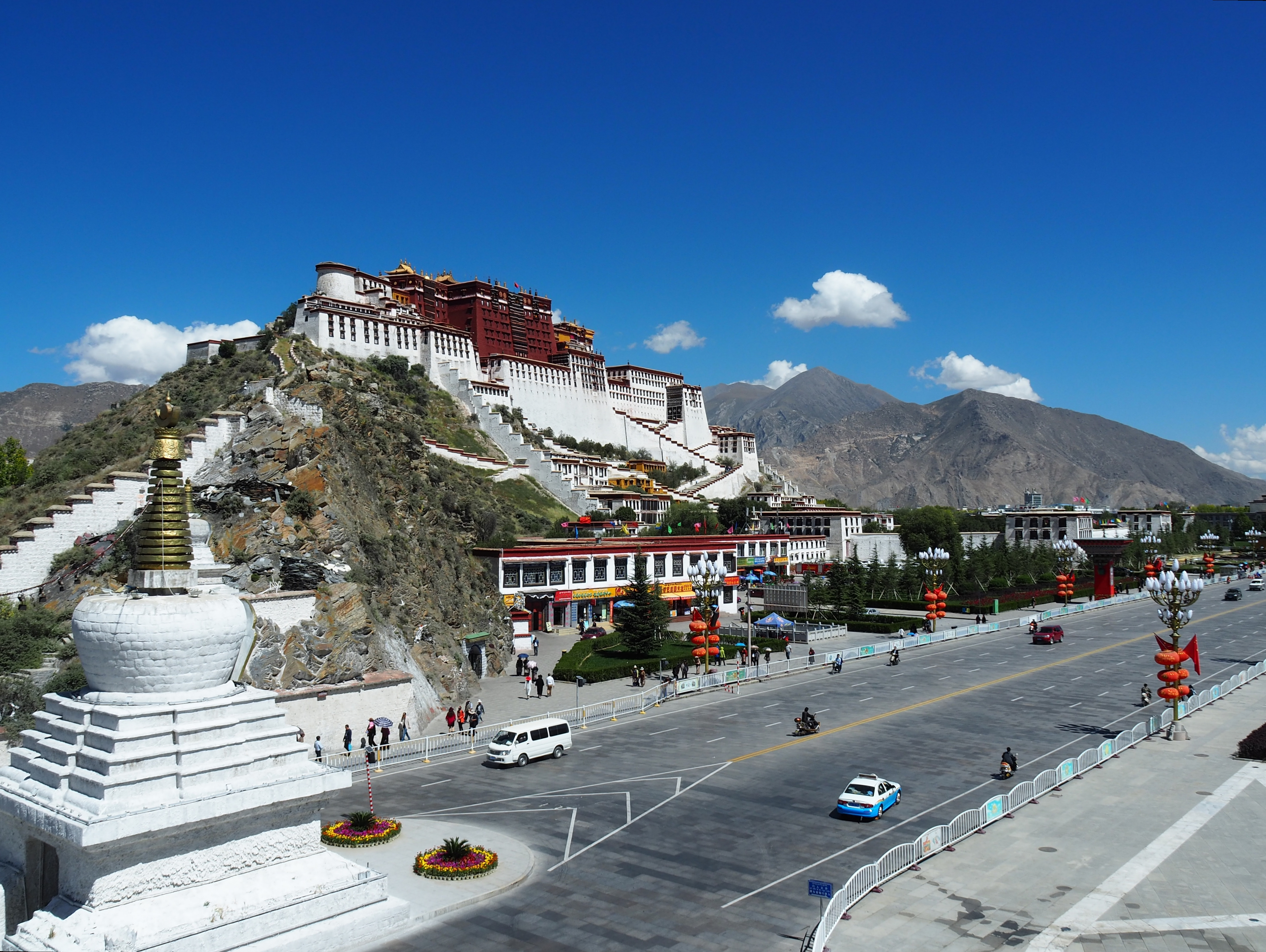
View showing recent Western Gate shops, highway, 2015

The number of visitors to the palace was restricted to 1,600 a day, with opening hours reduced to six hours daily to avoid over-crowding from 1 May 2003. The palace was receiving an average of 1,500 a day prior to the introduction of the quota, sometimes peaking to over 5,000 in one day. Visits to the structure's roof were banned after restoration efforts were completed in 2006 to avoid further structural damage. Visitorship quotas were raised to 2,300 daily to accommodate a 30% increase in visitorship since the opening of the Qingzang railway into Lhasa on 1 July 2006, but the quota is often reached by mid-morning. Opening hours were extended during the peak period in the months of July to September, where over 6,000 visitors would descend on the site.

== Architecture ==
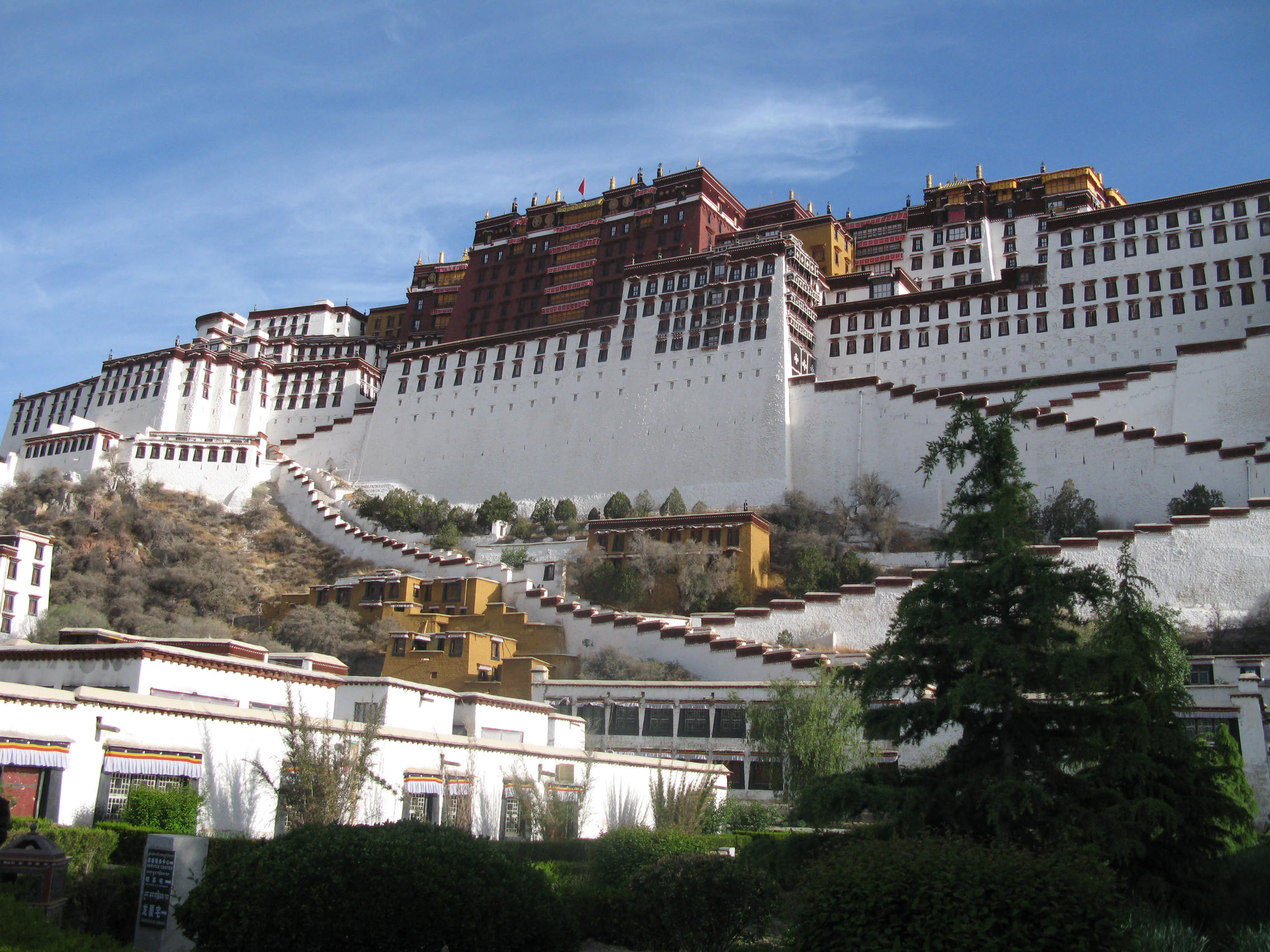

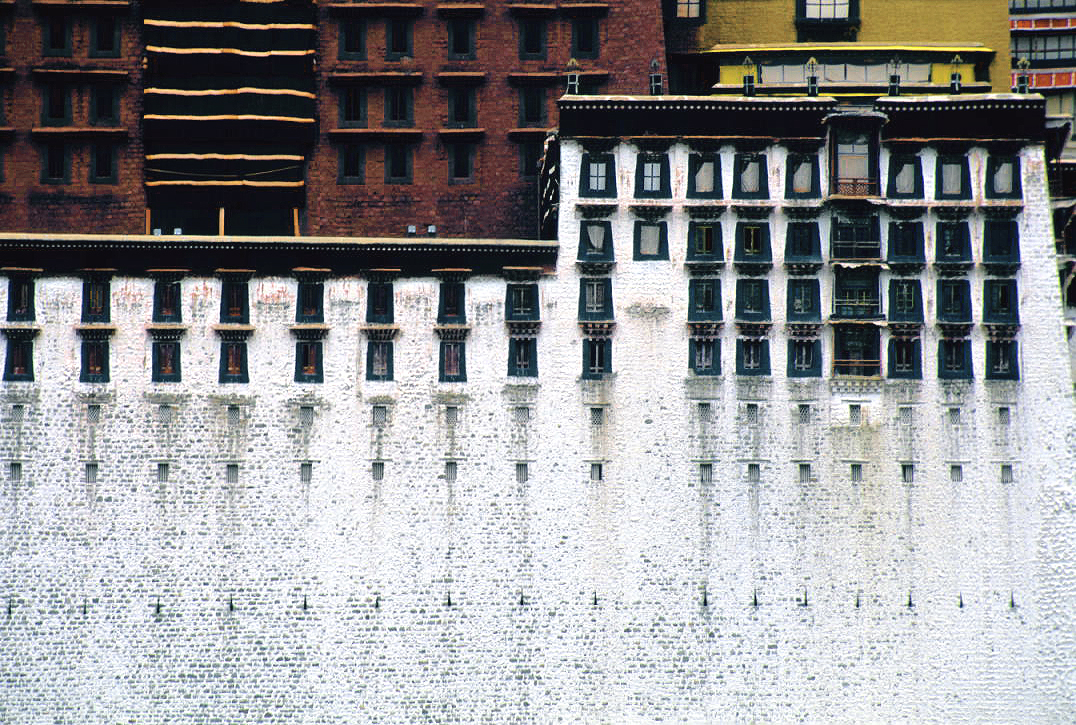

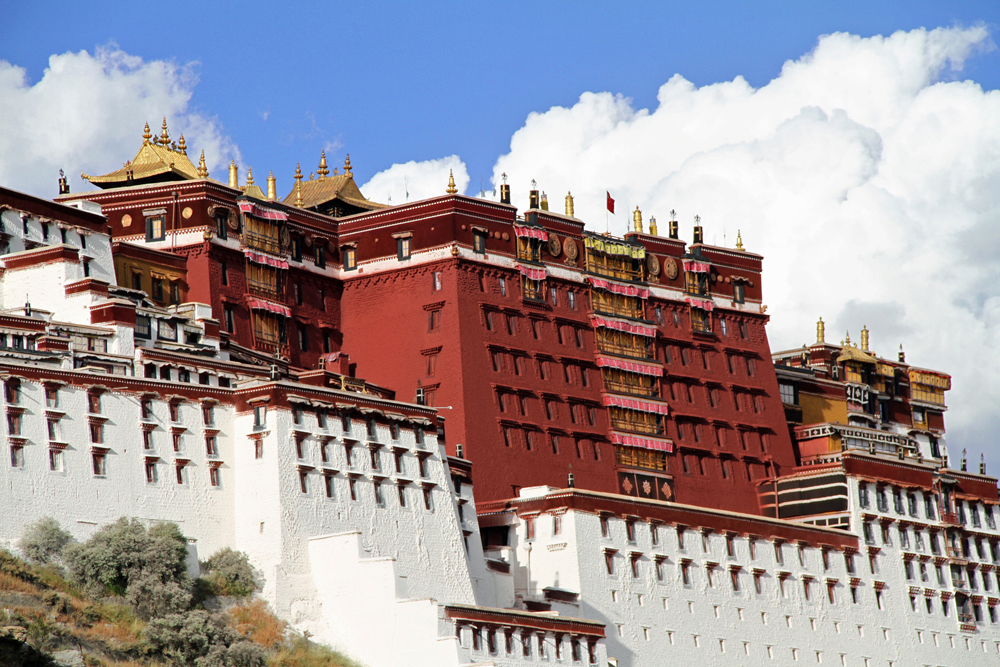

The Potala has inward-sloping walls with straight rows of many windows at the upper parts of the walls, and flat roofs at various levels. At the south base of the rock is a large space enclosed by walls and gates with great porticos on the inner side. A series of staircases with intervals leads to the summit of the rock. The whole width of this is occupied by the palace.

The central part of the group of buildings is a quadrangular terminating in gilt canopies similar to those on Jokhang Temple Monastery. The crimson coloured central member of Potala is called the "red palace" and contains the principal halls and chapels and shrines of past Dalai Lamas.

The colours: red, white, yellow, are caused by the application of limestone.

=== White Potala ===
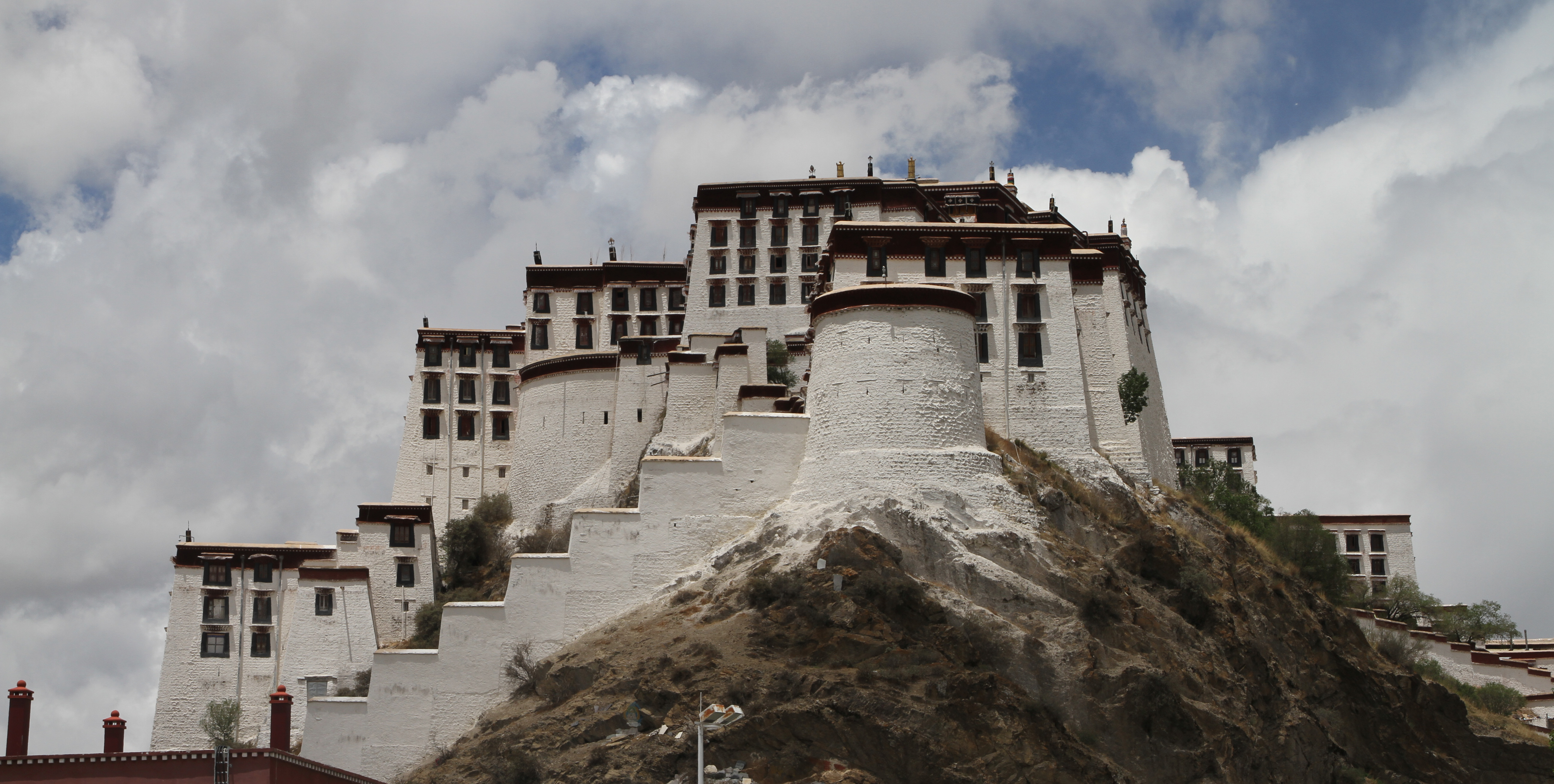

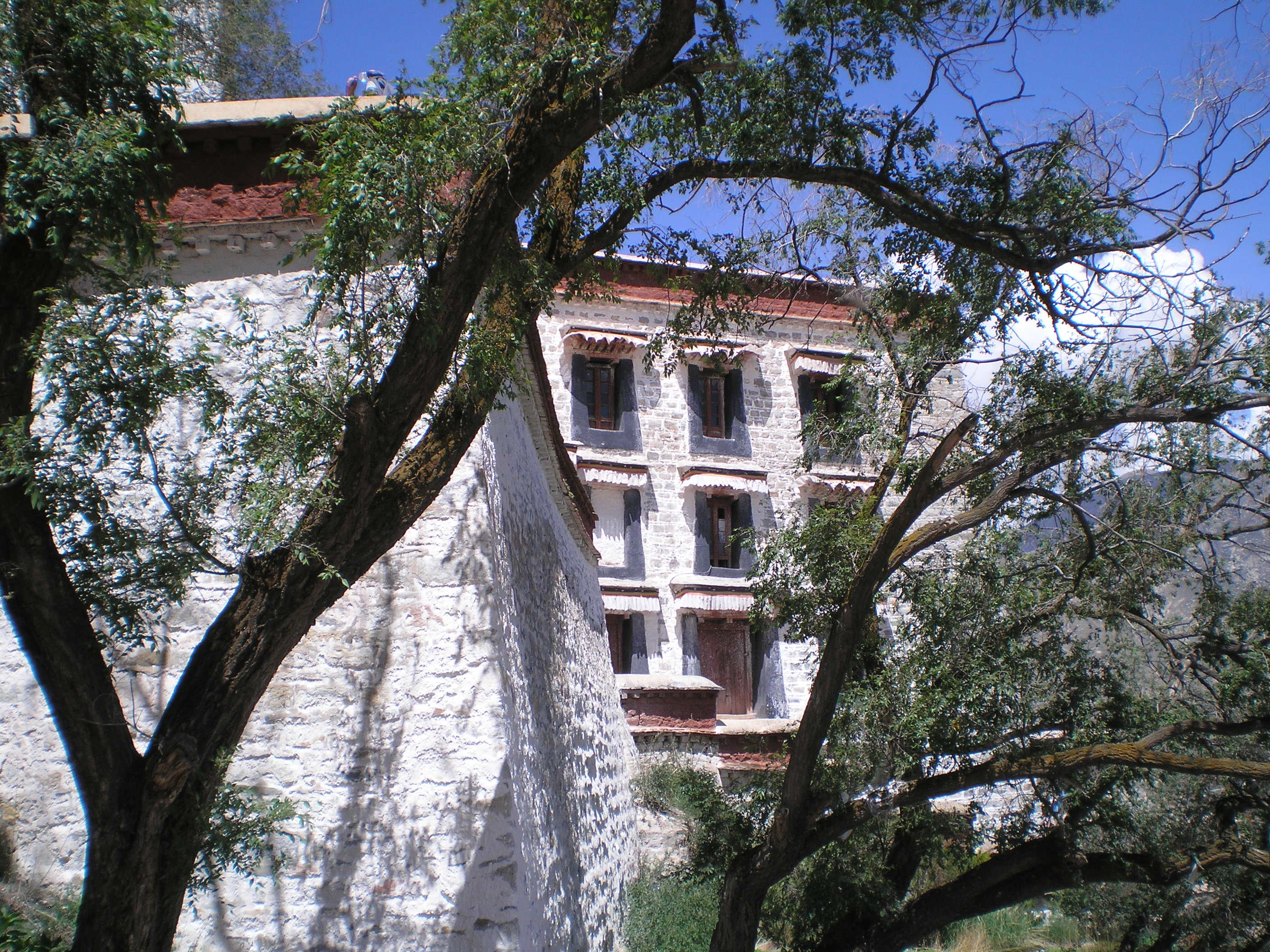

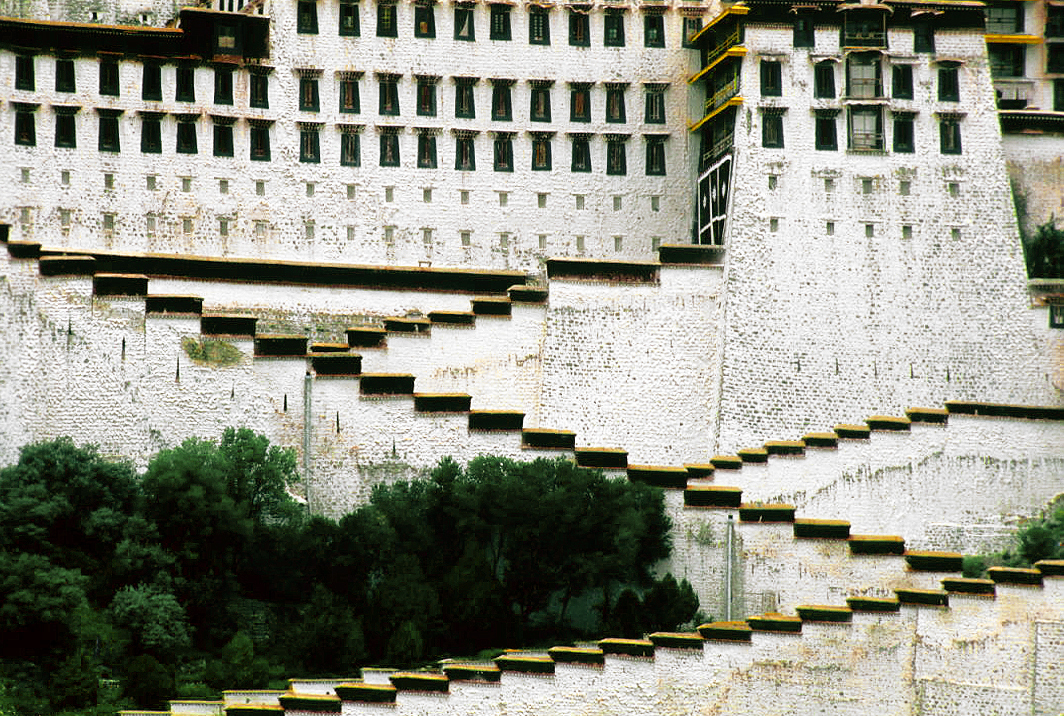

=== Red Potala ===
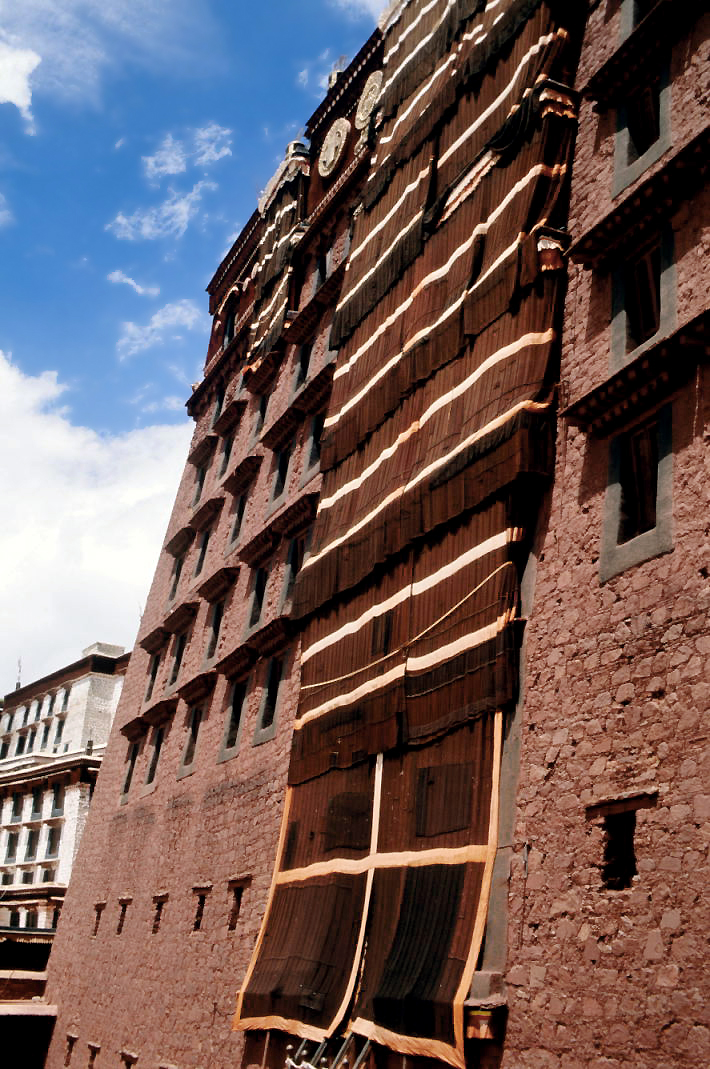

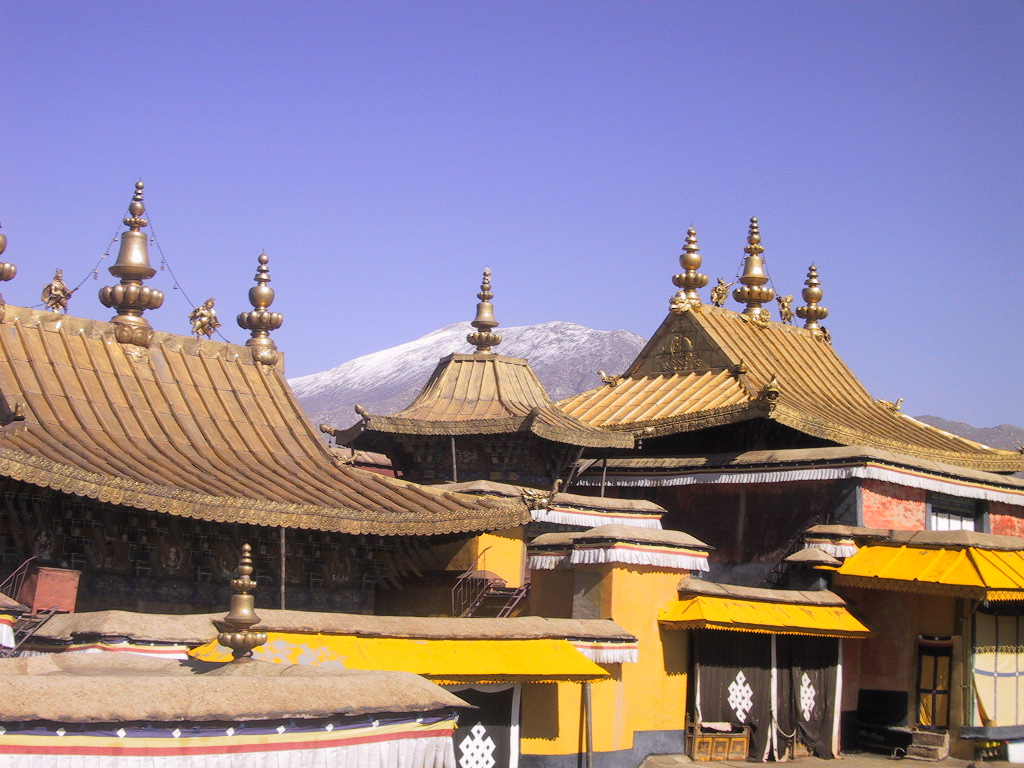

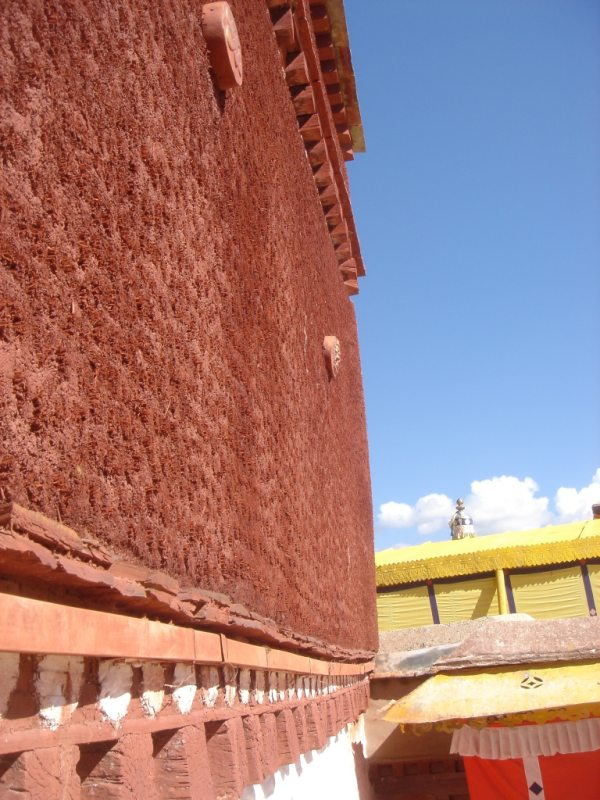

=== Interior ===
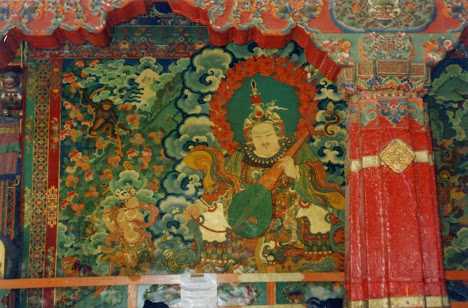
Detail of decoration

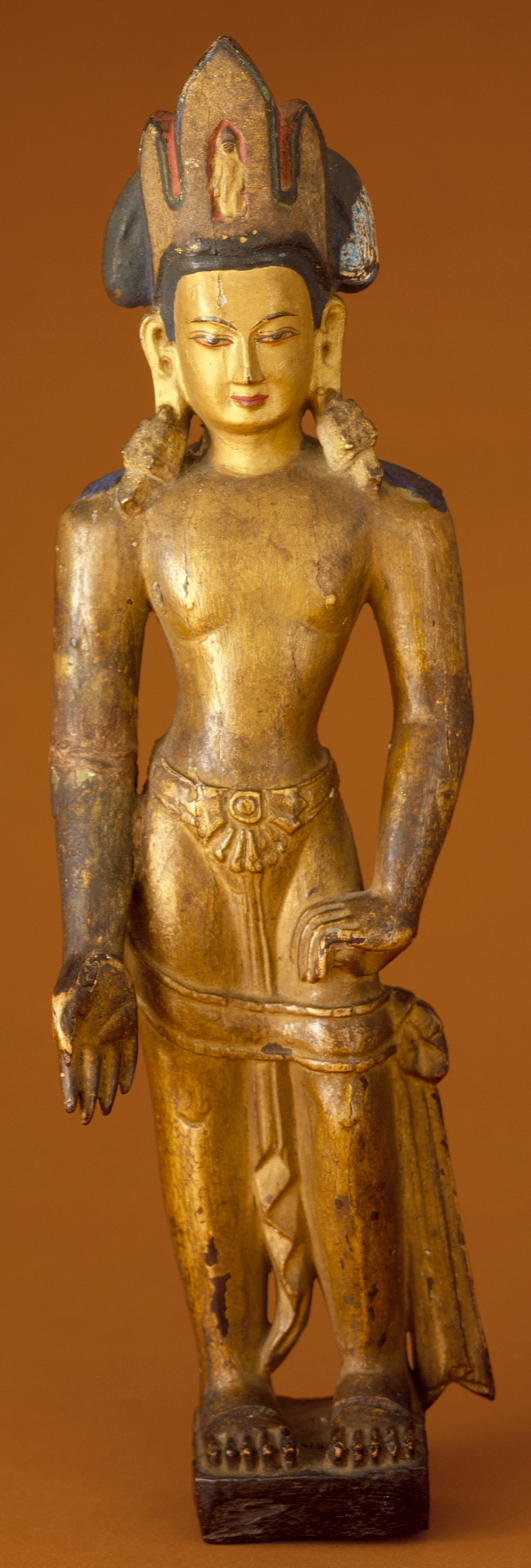
A copy of 13th-14th century Buddha statue

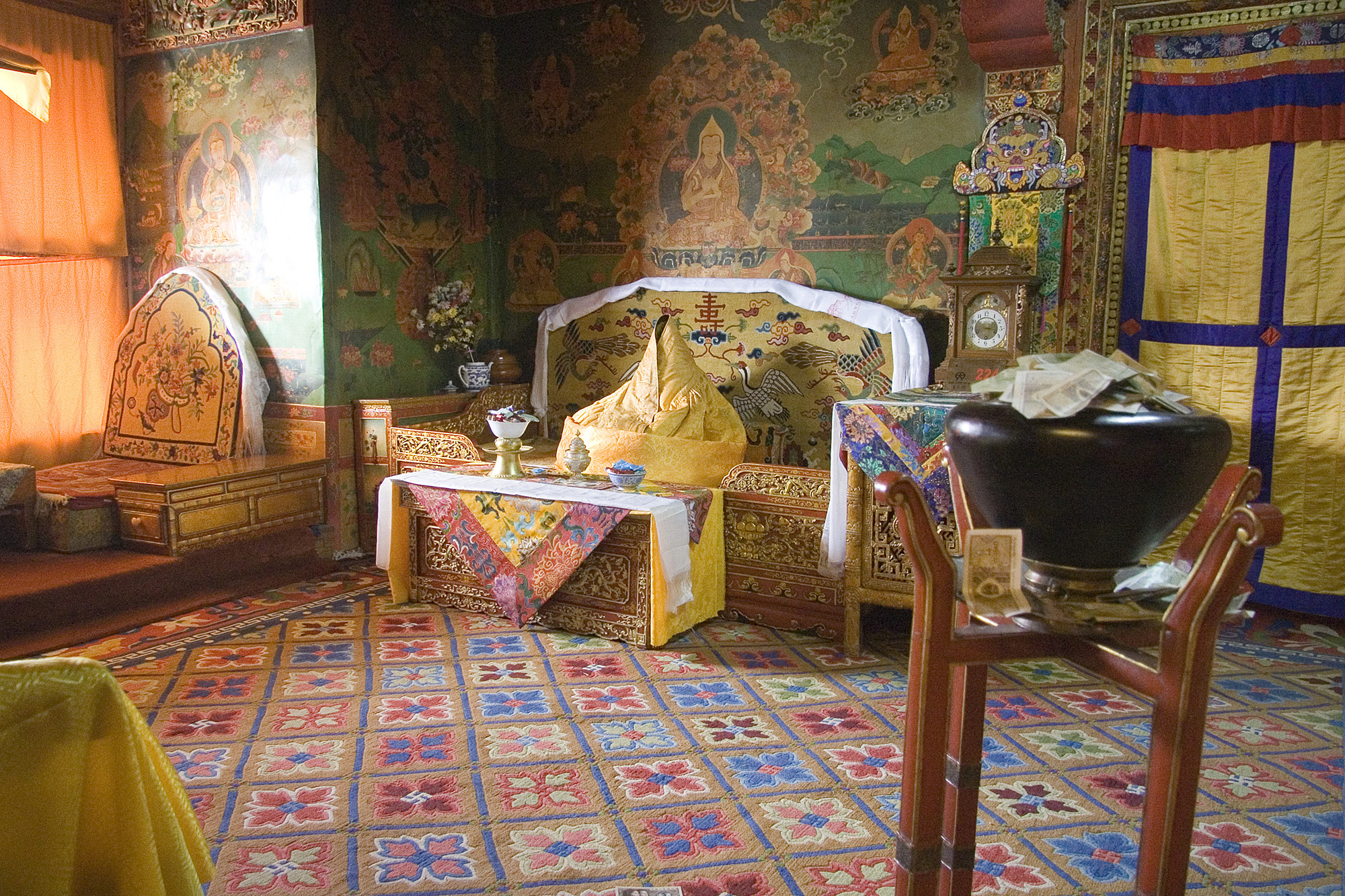
The former quarters of the Dalai Lama. The figure in the throne represents Tenzin Gyatso, the incumbent Dalai Lama. The throne bears the Chinese character 夀, meaning "long life".

=== Grounds ===
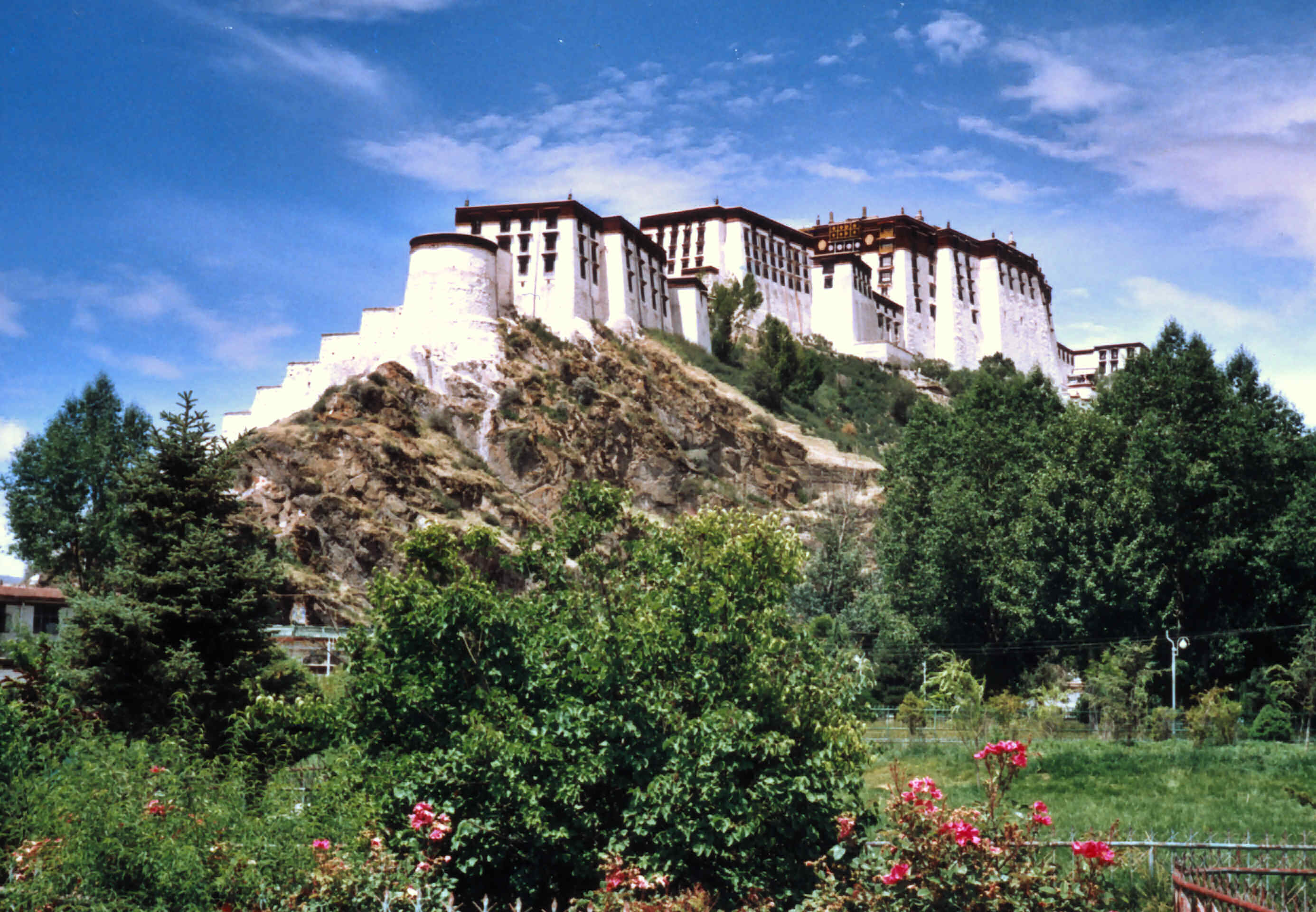
View from behind, seen from Ching Drol Chi Ling

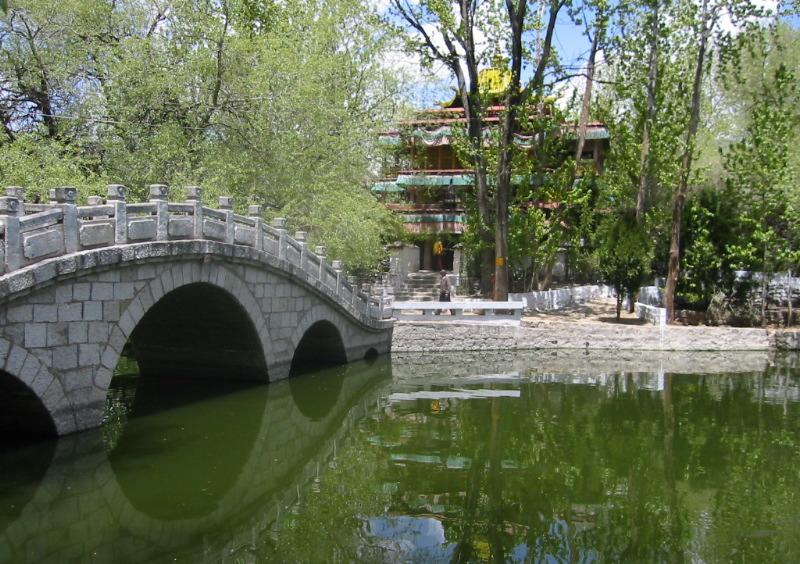
The park, pond, and Temple behind the Potala

== See also ==
- Dhvaja
- Kundun, a 1997 film about the Dalai Lama, chiefly set inside the palace
- Leh Palace
- Lhasa Mass Art Museum
- Lhasa Zhol Pillar
- List of tallest structures built before the 20th century
- Mount Putuo
- Norbulingka, the Dalai Lama's former summer palace
- Patala, Patala/Potala
- Seven Years in Tibet

== Sources ==
- Beckwith, Christopher I. (1987). The Tibetan Empire in Central Asia. Princeton University Press. Princeton, New Jersey. ISBN 0-691-02469-3.
- Bishop, Peter. "Reading the Potala". In: Sacred Spaces and Powerful Places in Tibetan Culture: A Collection of Essays. (1999) Edited by Toni Huber, pp. 367–388. The Library of Tibetan Works and Archives, Dharamsala, H.P., India. ISBN 81-86470-22-0.
- Das, Sarat Chandra. Lhasa and Central Tibet. (1902). Edited by W. W. Rockhill. Reprint: Mehra Offset Press, Delhi (1988), pp. 145–146; 166–169; 262–263 and illustration opposite p. 154.
- Larsen and Sinding-Larsen (2001). The Lhasa Atlas: Traditional Tibetan Architecture and Landscape, Knud Larsen and Amund Sinding-Larsen. Shambhala Books, Boston. ISBN 1-57062-867-X.
- Richardson, Hugh E. (1984) Tibet & Its History. 1st edition 1962. Second Edition, Revised and Updated. Shambhala Publications. Boston ISBN 0-87773-376-7.
- Richardson, Hugh E. (1985). A Corpus of Early Tibetan Inscriptions. Royal Asiatic Society. ISBN 0-94759300-4.
- Snellgrove, David & Hugh Richardson. (1995). A Cultural History of Tibet. 1st edition 1968. 1995 edition with new material. Shambhala. Boston & London. ISBN 1-57062-102-0.
- von Schroeder, Ulrich. (1981). Indo-Tibetan Bronzes. (608 pages, 1244 illustrations). Hong Kong: Visual Dharma Publications Ltd. ISBN 962-7049-01-8
- von Schroeder, Ulrich. (2001). Buddhist Sculptures in Tibet. Vol. One: India & Nepal; Vol. Two: Tibet & China. (Volume One: 655 pages with 766 illustrations; Volume Two: 675 pages with 987 illustrations). Hong Kong: Visual Dharma Publications, Ltd. ISBN 962-7049-07-7
- von Schroeder, Ulrich. 2008. 108 Buddhist Statues in Tibet. (212 p., 112 colour illustrations) (DVD with 527 digital photographs). Chicago: Serindia Publications. ISBN 962-7049-08-5
- Yule, Henry; Waddell, Lawrence. (See p. 530.)
