= Lhatse =

Town in Tibet, China

Lhatse ཆུ་ཤར་ · 曲下镇
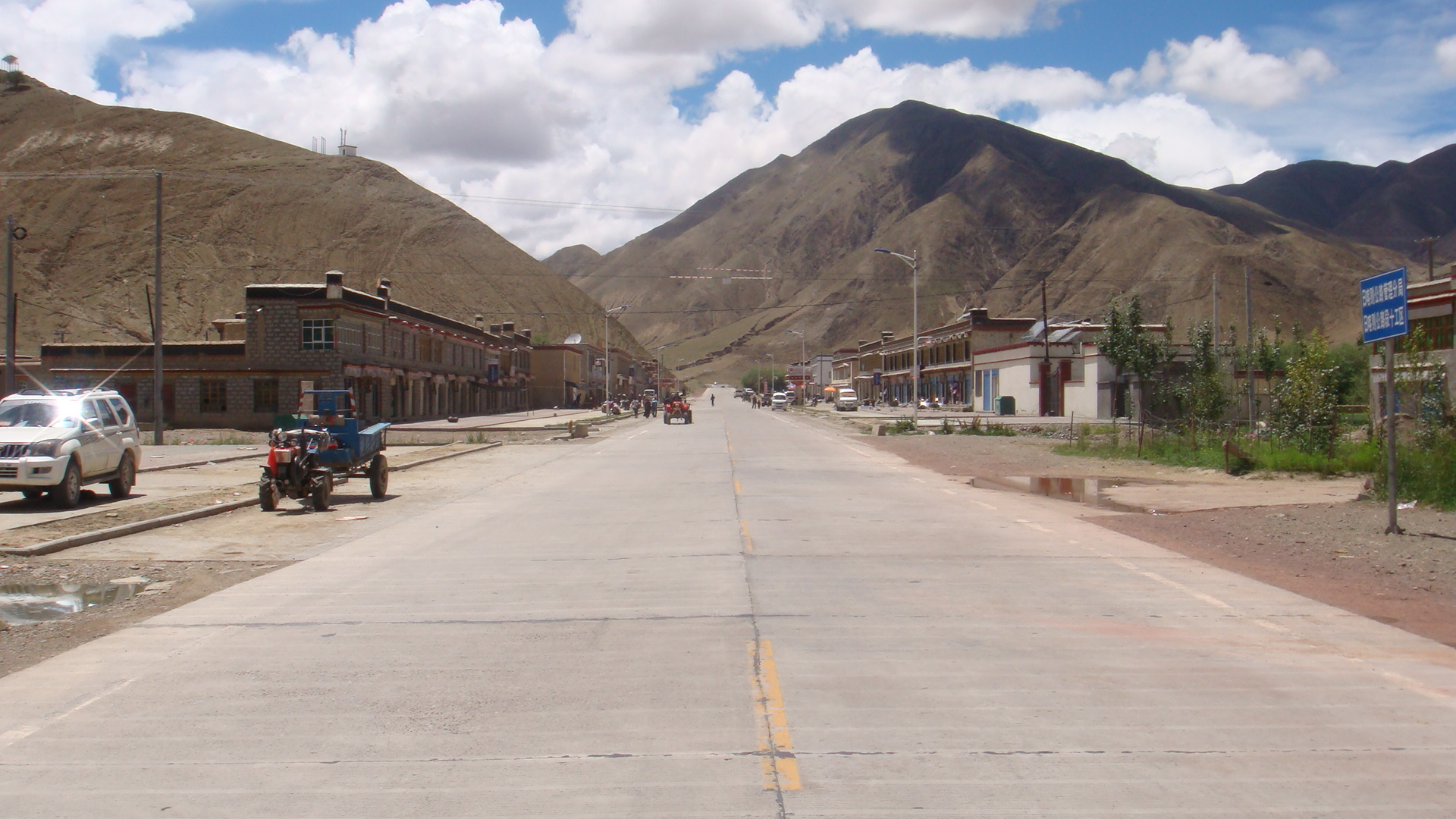

- Location within Tibet
- Coordinates (Quxar Town government): 29°05′18″N 87°38′16″E
- Country: People's Republic of China
- Autonomous region: Tibet
- Prefecture-level city: Shigatse
- Time zone: UTC+8 (CST)

Lhatse, also known as Chusar, Quxar (Tibetan: ཆུ་ཤར་) or Quxia (Chinese: 曲下镇; pinyin: Qūxià Zhèn), is a small town of a few thousand people in Lhatse County, Tibet Autonomous Region, China, in the valley of the Yarlung Tsangpo River 151 kilometres (94 mi) southwest of Shigatse and just west of the mountain pass leading to it. Lhatse is 4,050 metres (13,290 ft) above sea-level. Lhatse recorded the highest temperature of 28.9 °C (84.0 °F) in locations above 4,000 meters above sea level.

== Region ==
The modern town is 10 kilometres (6.2 mi) south of the old village of Lhatse and the small Gelug monastery of Lhatse Chö Dé (Wylie: lha rtse chos sde). Above the monastery are the ruins of the old dzong, Drampa Lhatse (Wylie: gram pa lha rtse) or Dzong Lhatse (Janglache or Lhatse Dzong), which is on a rock 150 metres (490 ft) high at the opening of the Yarlung Tsangpo Canyon. At the western end of the town is another small monastery, Changmoche.

10 kilometres (6.2 mi) east of Lhatse are the Xiqian Hot Springs, widely renowned for their healing properties.

Further east are the ruins of the Drampa Gyang (Wylie: gram pa rgyangs) Monastery, one of King Songtsän Gampo's main geomantic temples built in the 7th century. It was thought to pin down the troublesome left hip of the ogress whose body lay under all the high plateau with her heart located under the Jokhang in Lhasa. It once housed an image of Vairocana.

Near this spot in the 14th century the tertön or treasure finder, Sangpo Drakpa, discovered the popular Nyingma text by Padmasambhava called the Leu Dunma, which is a collection of prayers and devotions. To the north are the massive ruins of the Gyang Bumoche or Gyang Bumpoche, once 20 metres (66 ft) high, which was built in the style of the Kumbum by the Sakya Sonam Tashi (1352–1417) and the polymath and bridge builder, Thang Tong Gyalpo (1385–1464), and decorated in the Lato style of painting. This Jonang-school stupa was also called Tongdrol Chempo ('The Great Chorten that Gives Liberation by Setting Eyes upon It').

East of the ruins of the kumbum is the reconstructed Phuntsoling Monastery which was once attached to it. The main monastery and kumbum were restored and expanded by the renowned historian Taranatha (1575–1634) of the Jonang school. Under the 5th Dalai Lama (1617–1682), the Jonang school was suppressed and it was converted to the Gelug after Taranatha's death.

Further east is a little valley where there was previously a Nyingma gompa and hermitages, above which is the large cave of Gyang Lompo Lung which contains a shrine. The whole valley was, however, deserted in 1985.

Because the roads to Mount Everest and to Mount Kailash divide just west of Lhatse, the town is a common lunch stop for tour groups heading to those locations. Buddhist festivals are sometimes held at the monastery, drawing inhabitants from the surrounding region. There are several hotels and restaurants in the town.

Lhatse

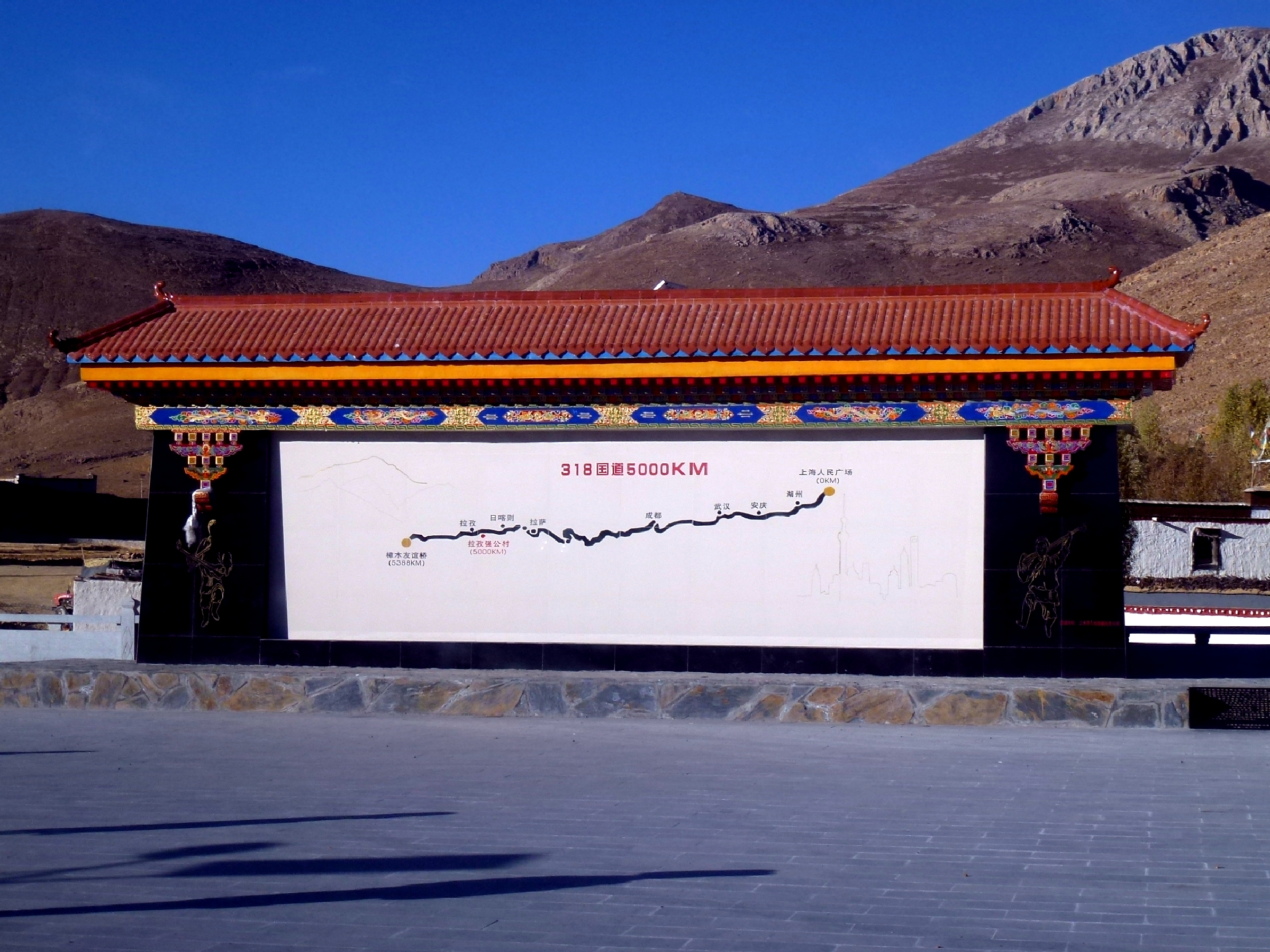
G318 5000 km

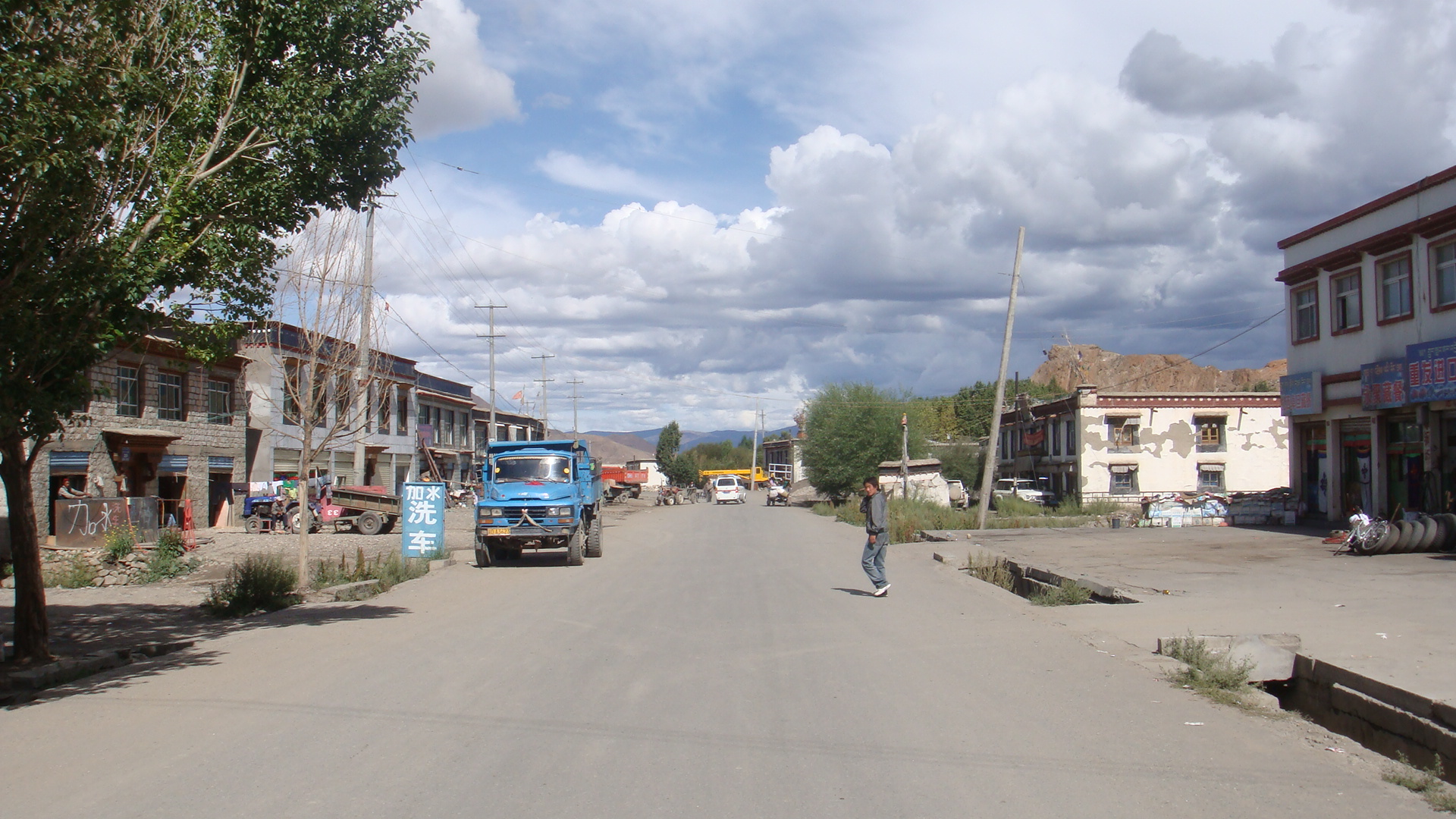

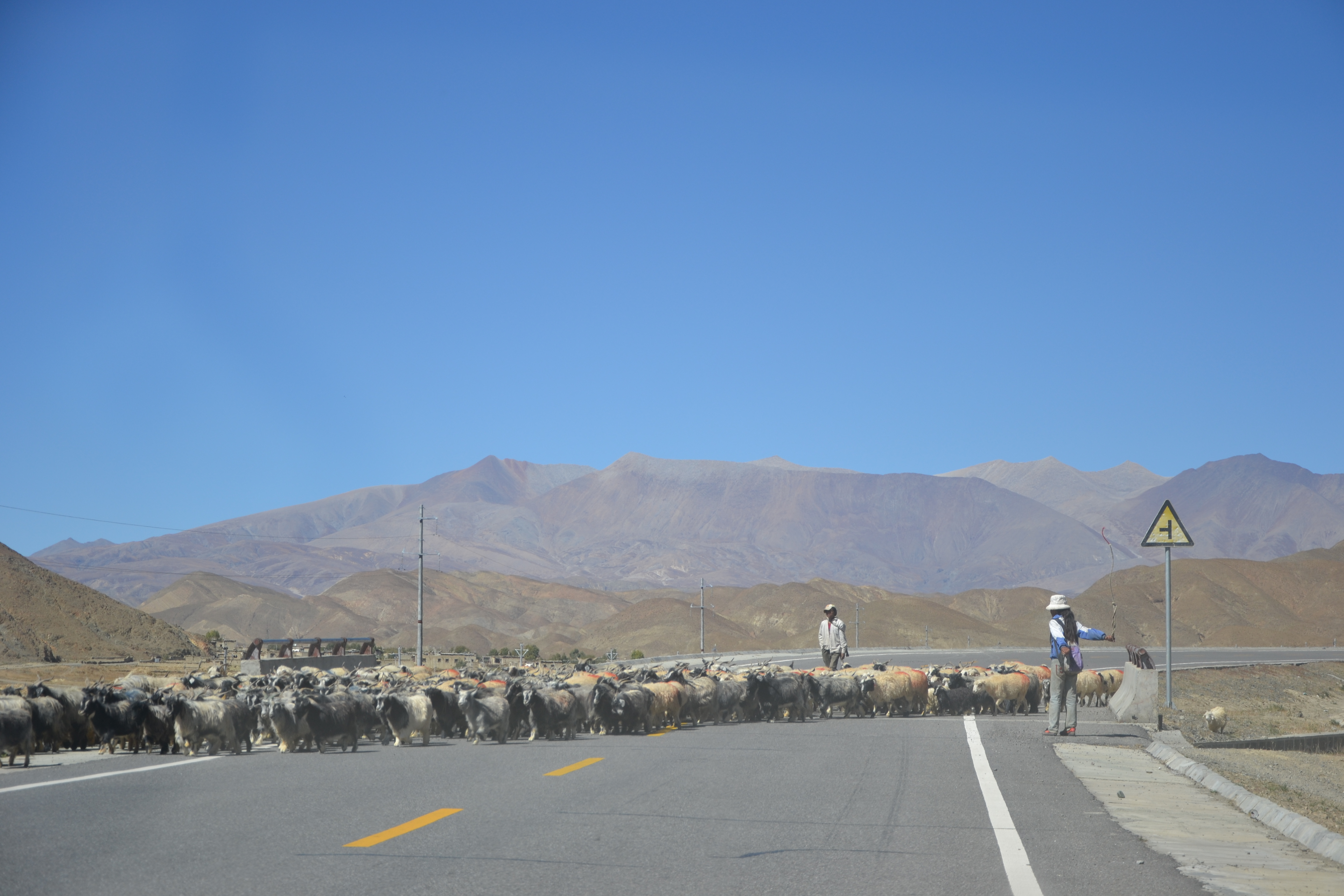

== Sister city ==
In 2010, the French city of Salles-sur-Garonne became a sister city of Lhatse.

== Notable people ==
- Chapel Tseten Phuntsog (1922–2013), Tibetan historian
