= Etymology of Tibet =

Tibet is a region of southerwestern China on a high plateau north of the Himalayas. The first known written use of the English word Tibet dates back to 1827 CE and may have been derived from older terms in other languages similar to Mongol term Tibyet, or Töbed. The first known Chinese words Xizang and the simplified form Zang date back to time between 1591 CE (萬曆十八年) and 1592 CE (萬曆十九年) during the Ming Dynasty. The first known official use of Xizhang in Qing records dates back to 1663 CE (康熙二年). Their definitions and usage have been controversial in terms of the extent of territory being claimed.

The endonymic term is Bod (Tibetan: བོད་; Bö) or Ü-Tsang (དབུས་གཙང་; Wü-Tsang) for Central Tibet. The Chinese term Tǔbō or Tǔfān (吐蕃) was used during the Tang and Song dynasties to refer to the historical Tibetan Empire. In 1720 the Kangxi Emperor of Qing dynasty wrote an edict for the Imperial Stele Inscriptions of the Pacification of Tibet in Han, Manchu, Mongolian, and Tibetan languages. At that point, Xizang officially appeared, replacing other terms like Kokham (朵甘) and Ali Sankor (阿里三廓, "Nari Sugulusun" in the Yuan and Ming dynasties). The Manchu term is Wargi Dzang, and the Mongol term is Töbed. Xizang was subsequently used in all documents such as 13-Article Ordinance for the More Effective Governing of Tibet in 1751, or 29-Article Ordinance for the More Effective Governing of Tibet of 1793. Xizang has become synonymous in China with the Tibet Autonomous Region.

== Names ==
=== In English ===
The first known written use of the English adjective Tibetian is from in 1747; the first known use of the modern form, Tibetan, was in 1822. The first known written use of the proper noun was in 1827 as Thibet. The western name, is, however, much older: it was recorded in the 13th century by Giovanni da Pian del Carpine and William Rubruck, as Tebet. William Rubruck (1253) records Tebet as the name of a people, situated beyond the Tangut, and were distinctive for their customs and traditions. The name Tebet appears to be a loan from an Iranian or Turkic language, perhaps Sogdian. In 17th-century Modern Latin, Tibet is known as Tibetum (also Thibetum, Tibet, Thobbat, Tubet). The ultimate origin of the name, however, remains unclear. Suggestions include derivation from Tibetan, Turkic or Chinese.

The proposed Tibetan etymology derives the term from Stod-bod (pronounced Tö-bhöt) "High/Upper Tibet" from the autonym Bod. Andreas Gruschke's study of the Tibetan Amdo Province says,

At the beginning of the Tang dynasty's rule of China, Tibetans were called Tubo, a term that seems to be derived from tu phod or stod pod (upper Tibet). The archaic Tibetan dialects of Amdo have retained the articulation of the medieval Tibetan language; as such the pronunciation is Töwöd, as in Mongolian tongue. Thus, the term was handed down as Tübüt in Turkish diction, Tibbat in Arabic and passed on as Tibet in Western languages.

The proposed Turkic etymology adduces töbäd 'the heights' (plural of töbän). Behr (1994) cites Bazin and Hamilton (1991) to the effect that the four variant 土/吐-番/蕃 characters used to write Tu-fan/bo (Middle Chinese *Tʰɔʰ-buan < Old Chinese *Thaˤ-pjan) "Tibet" suggest "a purely phonetic transcription" of an underlying *Töpün "The Heights, Peaks" "Tibet" etymology from Old Turkic töpä/töpü "peak; height". He further hypothesizes that the final -t in Tibet names derives from "an Altaic collective plural which results in *Töpät, thus perfectly matching Turkic Töpüt 'Tibet'", which is attested in the Old Turkic Orkhon inscriptions.

Proposed Chinese etymology compares Tǔfān / Tǔbō. The premise of the Chinese name being the primary origin of the name hinges its having had -t final in Middle Chinese, e.g., Eric Partridge's hypothetical Tu-pat. Stein (1922) assumes that Tufan has the same origin as Tibet, but not that the latter is adopted from Chinese: Instead, the Chinese name would have arisen "by assimilation with the name of the T'u-fa, a Turco-Mongol race, who must originally have been called something like Tuppat", also reflected in Sogdian and Turkic texts as Tüpüt.

Origins: A short etymological dictionary of modern English states that "Tibet seems to have passed to us through the Ar name (Tibat, Tobbat), drawn from the anicent Ch name (Tu-pat, Tu-fan)".

Before the 1990s, Tibet in scholarly English literature almost always referred to only central Tibet (roughly Ü-Tsang geographically). The currently promoted definition of Tibet with its broader inclusion of cultural or ethnographic Tibetan areas, also known as "Greater Tibet", often leads to historical misunderstanding and confusion, because Amdo and Kham were often not treated as part of the same polity as central Tibet even by the government in Lhasa. The relatively recent push by Tibetan exiles for a "Greater Tibet" has made negotiations with China more difficult for the 14th Dalai Lama because their demands cover areas with non-Tibetan populations and histories.

=== In Tibetan ===
The Standard or Central Tibetan endonym for Tibet, Bod (Tibetan: བོད), is pronounced [pʰøʔ], transliterated Bhö or Phö.

One local explanation for the origin of Bod is that it is derived from the bod pa, a warning call used by herdsmen in pre-agricultural Tibet. According to Tibetan historian Chapel Tseten Phuntsog, the herdsmen formed close bonds with each other because they lived sparsely in a remote area that was prone to natural disasters and attacks by bandits and wild animals. When a herdsman became aware of incoming danger, he would yell "geye" or "waye" – the bod pa – from atop a hill to warn others. Bod consequently became the name of the region over time.

In regard to external uses of the endonym Bod, the French Sinologist and Tibetologist Rolf Stein explains in his 1922 work Tibetan Civilization:

The name Tibetans give their country, Bod (now pronounced Pö in the Central dialect, as we have seen), was closely rendered and preserved by their Indian neighbours to the south, as Bhoṭa, Bhauṭa or Bauṭa. It has even been suggested that this name is to be found in Ptolemy and the Periplus Maris Erythraei, a first-century Greek narrative, where the river Bautisos and a people called the Bautai are mentioned in connexion with a region of Central Asia. But we have no knowledge of the existence of Tibetans at that time.

American philologist Christopher Beckwith agrees that Ptolemy's geographic reference to the "Bautai – i.e., the "Bauts"" was "the first mention in either Western or Eastern historical sources of the native ethnonym of Tibet". He compares the 4th-century historian Ammianus Marcellinus describing the Bautai living "on the slopes of high mountains to the south" of Serica with contemporaneous Chinese sources recording a Qiang people called the Fa 發, anciently "pronounced something like Puat" and "undoubtedly intended to represent Baut, the name that became pronounced by seventh-century Tibetans as Bod (and now, in the modern Lhasa dialect, rather like the French peu)." Beckwith states in his 1987 work The Tibetan Empire in Central Asia:

This first mention of the name Bod, the usual name for Tibet in the later Tibetan historical sources, is significant in that it is used to refer to a conquered region. In other words, the ancient name Bod originally referred only to a part of the Tibetan Plateau, a part which, together with Rtsaṅ (Tsang, in Tibetan now spelled Gtsaṅ), has come to be called Dbus-gtsaṅ (Central Tibet).

=== In Chinese ===
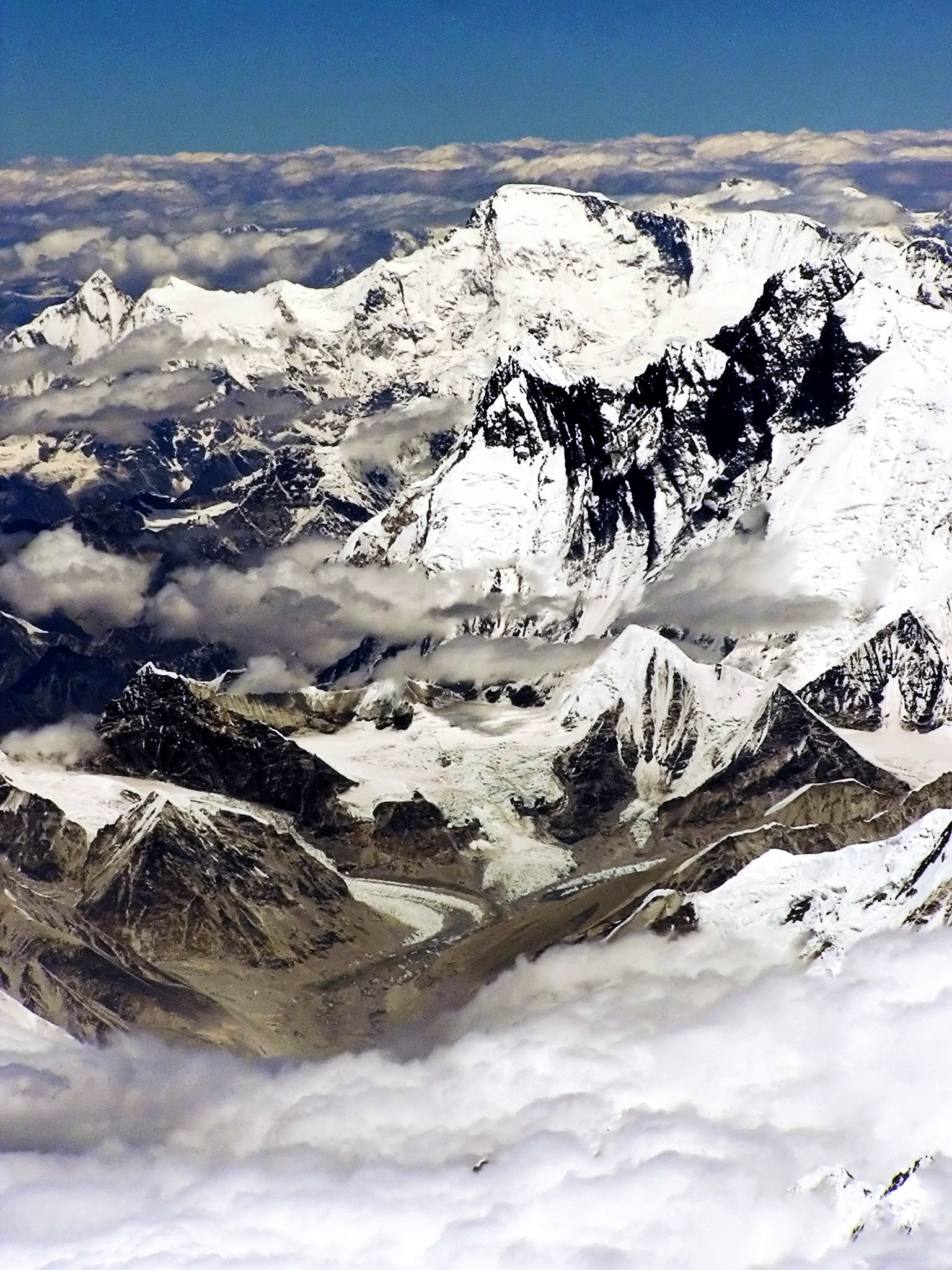
The Tibetan Plateau near China's southern border with Nepal

The oldest Chinese language name for Tibetan Empire is 吐蕃 (Middle Chinese transliteration thuX bjon), with modern Standard Chinese transliteration as either Tǔbō or Tǔfān. Chinese 藏 Zàng ("Tsang") is a loan from Tibetan གཙང (gtsang), the name of the southwestern part of the Tibetan Plateau.

Modern Xizang (Chinese: 西藏; pinyin: Xīzàng; Wade–Giles: Hsi-tsang) 'Western Tsang' now specifies the "Tibet Autonomous Region".

The name 吐蕃 is recorded in the Old Book of Tang (dated 945 CE), relating that the Tibetan King Namri Songtsen (Gnam-ri-slon-rtsan) sent two emissaries to Emperor Yang of Sui in 608 and 609. The two characters had the following medieval readings:

- 吐 could be read as thuX > tǔ 'spit' or thuH > tù 'vomit'.
- 蕃 could be read as puan > fān 'hedge, fence' or buan > fán 'luxuriant growth'.

According to Paul Pelliot, the pronunciation tǔbō was suggested by Jean-Pierre Abel-Rémusat in the early 19th century, based on pronunciations of similar characters and the Tibetan name Bod, and adopted uncritically by other European scholars. Herbert Giles included this pronunciation in the 1912 revision of his dictionary. It also appears in Mathews' Chinese–English Dictionary. W. South Coblin conjectures that it was adopted by mainland Chinese scholars after 1949. In contrast, Victor H. Mair argues that it was the original pronunciation.

Contemporary Chinese dictionaries disagree whether 吐蕃 'Tibet' is pronounced Tǔbō or Tǔfān – a question complicated by the homophonous slur tǔfān 土番 (lit. 'dirt barbarians', possibly 'agricultural barbarians') "barbarians; natives; aborigines". The Hanyu Da Cidian cites the first recorded Chinese usages of Tǔfān 土番 'ancient name for Tibet' in the 7th century (Li Tai) and tǔfān 土番 'natives (derogatory)' in the 19th century (Bi Fucheng 薜福成). None of the dictionaries giving Tǔbō includes a fanqie pronunciation, which is typically found in entries taken from older dictionaries.

Stein discusses the fan pronunciation of "Tibet".

The Chinese, well informed on the Tibetans as they were from the seventh century onwards, rendered Bod as Fan (at that time pronounced something like B'i̭wan). Was this because the Tibetans sometimes said 'Bon' instead of 'Bod', or because 'fan' in Chinese was a common term for 'barbarians'? We do not know. But before long, on the testimony of a Tibetan ambassador, the Chinese started using the form T'u-fan, by assimilation with the name of the T'u-fa, a Turco-Mongol race, who must originally have been called something like Tuppat. At the same period, Turkic and Sogdian texts mention a people called 'Tüpüt', situated roughly in the north-east of modern Tibet. This is the form that Moslem writers have used since the ninth century (Tübbet, Tibbat, etc.). Through them it reached the medieval European explorers (Piano-Carpini, Rubruck, Marco Polo, Francesco della Penna).

Xizàng 西藏 is the present-day Chinese name for "Tibet". This compound of xi 西 'west' and zàng 藏 'storage place; treasure vault; (Buddhist/Daoist) canon (e.g., Daozang)' is a phonetic transliteration of Ü-Tsang, the traditional province in western and central Tibet.

Zàng 藏 was used to transcribe the Tsang people as early as the Yuan dynasty (1279–1368 CE), and "Xizang" was coined under the Qing dynasty Jiaqing Emperor (r. 1796–1820 CE). Zàng is used as an abbreviation for "Tibet" in words such as Zàngwén 藏文 "Tibetan language" and Zàngzú 藏族 "Tibetan people".

== Geographical definitions ==
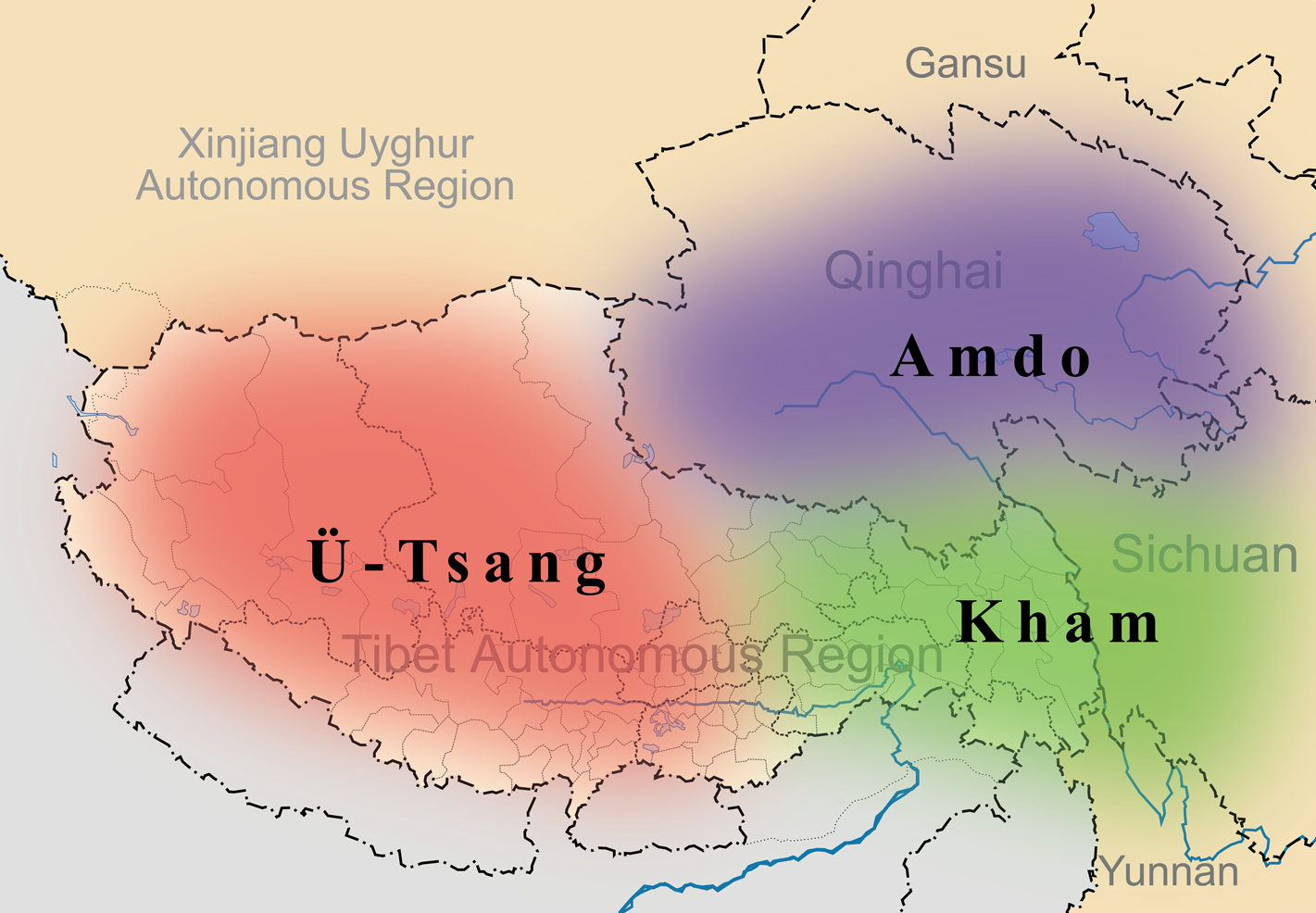
Map of the approximate extent of the three provinces of the Tibetan Empire (8th century) overlaid on a map of modern borders.

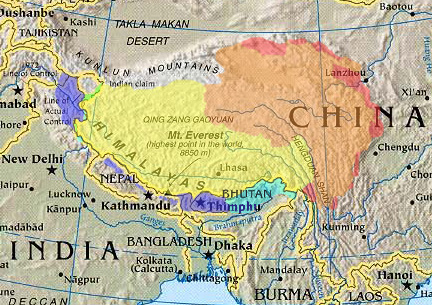
- "Greater Tibet" as claimed by Tibetan exile groups
- Tibetan autonomous areas, as designated by China
- Tibet Autonomous Region, within China
- Chinese-controlled, claimed by India as part of Aksai Chin
- Indian-controlled, parts claimed by China as South Tibet
- Other areas historically within the Tibetan cultural sphere

The difference in definition is a major source of dispute. The distribution of Amdo and eastern Kham into surrounding provinces was initiated by the Yongzheng Emperor during the 18th century and has been continuously maintained by successive Chinese governments. In 1720, Emperor Kangxi wrote an edict for the Imperial Stele Inscriptions of the Pacification of Tibet in the Manchu, Han, Mongolian, and Tibetan languages. At that point, Xizang officially appeared, replacing the term Tubo used since the Tang and Song dynasties, and the terms Kokham (朵甘), Ü-Tsang (乌思藏), and Ali Sankor (阿里三廓, Nari Sugulusun in the Yuan and Ming dynasties) in China. The Tibetan term for Xizang is Bod, the Manchu term for Xizang is Wargi Dzang, and the Mongol term for Xizang is Töbed.

Since the Thirteen Articles for the Settlement of Qinghai Affairs were submitted to Emperor Yongzheng in 1724, for the demarcations made during the Yongzheng reign, the borders between Tibet, Qinghai, Sichuan and Yunnan were basically determined.

Western scholars such as anthropologist Melvyn Goldstein exclude Amdo and Kham from political Tibet:

"[Dalai Lama] claimed all of Kham and Amdo in the Simla Convention of 1913–14 – most of these areas in fact were not a part of its polity for the two centuries preceding the rise to power of the Communists in China in 1949 ... The term ‘Tibet’ refers to the political state ruled by the Dalai Lamas; it does not refer to the ethnic border areas such as Amdo and Kham which were not part of that state in modern times, let alone to Ladakh or Northern Nepal. Until recently, this convention was, as far as I can discern, universally accepted in the scholarly literature"

A modern nation-state usually has clearly defined borders at which one government's authority ceases and that of another begins. In centuries past, the Tibetan and Chinese governments had strong centers from which their power radiated, and weakened with distance from the capital. Inhabitants of border regions often considered themselves independent of both. Actual control exercised over these areas shifted in favor of one government or the other over the course of time. This history is conducive to ambiguity as to what areas belonged to Tibet, or to China, or to neither, at various times.

Rob Gifford, a National Public Radio journalist, said that in 2007, the region sometimes known as "ethnographic Tibet", which includes sections of Gansu, Qinghai, and Sichuan that surround the TAR, has greater religious freedoms than the TAR since the authorities in Beijing do not perceive the Tibetan populations in the areas as having the likelihood to strive for political independence.

In spite of the changing nature of the recognised borders between the two countries over the centuries, and arguments about their positions (something common to many modern states as well), there were serious attempts from very early times to delineate the borders clearly to avoid conflict. One of the earliest such attempts was promulgated in the Sino-Tibetan treaty which was agreed on in 821/822 under the Tibetan emperor Ralpacan. It established peace for more than two decades. A bilingual account of this treaty is inscribed on a stone pillar which stands outside the Jokhang temple in Lhasa. Here is the main core of this remarkable agreement:

"... The great king of Tibet, the supernaturally wise divinity, the btsan-po and the great king of China, the Chinese ruler Hwang Te, Nephew and Uncle, having consulted about the alliance of their dominions have made a great treaty and ratified the agreement. In order that it may never be changed, all gods and men have been made aware of it and taken as witnesses; and so that it may be celebrated in every age and in every generation the terms of agreement have been inscribed on a stone pillar.
The supernaturally wise divinity, the btsan-po, Khri Gtsug-lde-brtsan himself and the Chinese ruler, B'un B'u He'u Tig Hwang Te, their majesties the Nephew and Uncle, through the great profundity of their minds know whatsoever is good and ill for present and future alike. With great compassion, making no distinction between outer and inner in sheltering all with kindness, they have agreed in their counsel on a great purpose of lasting good—the single thought of causing happiness for the whole population—and have renewed the respectful courtesies of their old friendship. Having consulted to consolidate still further the measure of neighbourly contentment they have made a great treaty. Both Tibet and China shall keep the country and frontiers of which they are now in possession. The whole region to the east of that being the country of Great China and the whole region to the west being assuredly the country of Great Tibet, from either side of that frontier there should be no warfare, no hostile invasions, and no seizure of territory. If there be any suspicious person, he shall be arrested and an investigation made and, having been suitably provided for, he shall be sent back.
Now that the dominions are allied and a great treaty of peace has been made in this way, since it is necessary also to continue the communications between Nephew and Uncle, envoys setting out from either side shall follow the old established route. According to former custom their horses shall be changed at Tsang Kun Yog which is between Tibet and China. Beyond Stse Zhung Cheg, where Chinese territory is met, the Chinese shall provide all facilities, beyond Tseng Shu Hywan, where Tibetan territory is met, the Tibetans shall provide all facilities. According to the close and friendly relationship between Nephew and Uncle the customary courtesy and respect shall be observed. Between the two countries no smoke or dust shall appear. Not even a word of sudden alarm or of enmity shall be spoken and from those who guard the frontier upwards all shall live at ease without suspicion or fear both on their land and in their beds. Dwelling in peace they shall win the blessing of happiness for ten thousand generations. The sound of praise shall extend to every place reached by the sun and moon. And in order that this agreement establishing a great era when Tibetans shall be happy in Tibet and Chinese shall be happy in China shall never be changed, the Three Jewels, the body of saints, the sun and moon, planets and stars have been invoked as witnesses; its purport has been expounded in solemn words; the oath has been sworn with the sacrifice of animals; and the agreement has been solemnized.
If the parties do not act in accordance with this agreement or if it is violated, whether it be Tibet or China that is first guilty of an offence against it, whatever stratagem or deceit is used in retaliation shall not be considered a breach of the agreement.
Thus the rulers and ministers of both Tibet and China declared, and swore the oath; and the text having been written in detail it was sealed with the seals of both great kings. It was inscribed with the signatures of those ministers who took part in the agreement and the text of the agreement was deposited in the archives of each party ..."

In more recent times the border between China and Tibet was recognised to be near the town of Batang, which marked the furthest point of Tibetan rule on the route to Chengdu:

"The temporal power of the Supreme Lama ends at Bathang. The frontiers of Tibet, properly so called, were fixed in 1726, on the termination of a great war between the Tibetans and the Chinese. Two days before you arrive at Bathang, you pass, on the top of a mountain, a stone monument, showing what was arranged at that time between the government of Lha-Ssa and that of Peking, on the subject of boundaries. At present, the countries situate east of Bathang are independent of Lha-Ssa in temporal matters. They are governed by a sort of feudal princes, originally appointed by the Chinese Emperor, and still acknowledging his paramount authority. These petty sovereigns are bound to go every third year to Peking, to offer their tribute to the Emperor."

Spencer Chapman gives a similar, but more detailed, account of this border agreement:

"In 1727, as a result of the Chinese having entered Lhasa, the boundary between China and Tibet was laid down as between the head-waters of the Mekong and Yangtse rivers, and marked by a pillar, a little to the south-west of Batang. Land to the west of this pillar was administered from Lhasa, while the Tibetan chiefs of the tribes to the east came more directly under China. This historical Sino-Tibetan boundary was used until 1910. The states Der-ge, Nyarong, Batang, Litang, and the five Hor States—to name the more important districts—are known collectively in Lhasa as Kham, an indefinite term suitable to the Tibetan Government, who are disconcertingly vague over such details as treaties and boundaries."

Alexander Hosie, the British Consul at Chengdu, made a quick trip from Batang to the Tibetan border escorted by Chinese authorities, in September 1904, on the promise that he would not even put a foot over the border into Tibet. He describes the border marker as being a 3 1/2 day journey (about 50 miles or 80 km) to the south and slightly west of Batang. It was a "well-worn, four-sided pillar of sandstone, about 3 feet in height, each side measuring some 18 inches. There was no inscription on the stone, and when unthinkingly I made a movement to look for writing on the Tibetan side, the Chinese officials at once stepped in front of me and barred the road to Tibet. Looking into Tibet the eye met a sea of grass-covered treeless hills. And from the valley at the foot of the Ningching Shan [which separate the valleys of the upper Mekong from that of the Jinsha or upper Yangtse] rose smoke from the camp fires of 400 Tibetan troops charged with the protection of the frontier. There was no time to make any prolonged inspection, for the Chinese authorities were anxious for me to leave as soon as possible."

André Migot, a French doctor and explorer, who travelled for many months in Tibet in 1947, stated:

"Once you are outside the North Gate [of Dardo or Kangting], you say good-by to Chinese civilization and its amenities and you begin to lead a different kind of life altogether. Although on paper the wide territories to the north of the city form part of the Chinese provinces of Sikang and Tsinghai, the real frontier between China and Tibet runs through Kangting, or perhaps just outside it. The empirical line which Chinese cartographers, more concerned with prestige than with accuracy, draw on their maps bears no relation to accuracy."

Migot, discussing the history of Chinese control of Tibet, states that it was not until the end of the 17th century that:

"the territories [of Sikang and Tsinghai] were annexed by the early Manchu emperors in accordance with their policy of unifying the whole of China, and even then annexation, though a fact on paper, was largely a fiction in practice. In those days Buddhism, which had gained a strong hold over most of Central Asia, had been adopted by the Manchu dynasty as their official religion, and the emperors even posed as protectors of the Tibetan Church.
Although there was a short military campaign, as a result of which Chinese garrisons were established at Tatsienlu, at Batang (Paan), and at key points along the road to Lhasa, Peking formally recognized and even proclaimed the Dalai Lama as the sole temporal sovereign authority in Tibet. The Manchus contented themselves with appointing to Lhasa two special commissioners, called ambans, in whom were vested powers to influence decisively the selection of all future reincarnations of the Dalai Lama. By way of reparation, the Emperor regularly distributed handsome grants of money to the lamaseries and the local chieftains. These comparatively urbane relations between the two countries, which had unobtrusively given the Tibetan priesthood a vested interest in the Chinese administration, lasted until the Manchu dynasty fell, and, while they lasted, Chinese armies from time to time entered Tibet on the pretext of protecting the country against Mongol invasions from Dzungaria. The Sino-Tibetan frontier was marked by the erection of a pillar on the Bum La, a pass which lies two and a half days' travel to the southwest of Batang; from there the frontier ran north along a line parallel to, and slightly west of, the Yangtze. All the territory to the west of this line was under the direct authority of the Dalai Lama, but to the east of it the petty chieftains of the local tribes retained, although they paid tribute to Peking, a considerable measure of independence.
These arrangements failed to survive the blow dealt, indirectly, to China's position in that part of the world by the British expedition to Lhasa in 1904. In order to offset the damage done to their interests by the [1906] treaty between England and Tibet, the Chinese set up about extending westwards the sphere of their direct control and began to colonize the country round Batang. The Tibetans reacted vigorously. The Chinese governor was killed on his way to Chamdo and his army put to flight after an action near Batang; several missionaries were also murdered, and Chinese fortunes were at a low ebb when a special commissioner called Chao Yu-fong appeared on the scene.
Acting with a savagery which earned him the sobriquet of "The Butcher of Monks", he swept down on Batang, sacked the lamasery, pushed on to Chamdo, and in a series of victorious campaigns which brought his army to the gates of Lhasa, re-established order and reasserted Chinese domination over Tibet. In 1909 he recommended that Sikang should be constituted a separate province comprising thirty-six subprefectures with Batang as the capital. This project was not carried out until later, and then in modified form, for the Chinese Revolution of 1911 brought Chao's career to an end and he was shortly afterwards assassinated by his compatriots.
The troubled early years of the Chinese Republic saw the rebellion of most of the tributary chieftains, a number of pitched battles between Chinese and Tibetans, and many strange happenings in which tragedy, comedy, and (of course) religion all had a part to play. In 1914 Great Britain, China, and Tibet met at the conference table to try to restore peace, but this conclave broke up after failing to reach agreement on the fundamental question of the Sino-Tibetan frontier. This, since about 1918, has been recognized for practical purposes as following the course of the Upper Yangtze. In these years the Chinese had too many other preoccupations to bother about reconquering Tibet. However, things gradually quieted down, and in 1927 the province of Sikang was brought into being, but it consisted of only twenty-seven subprefectures instead of the thirty-six visualized by the man who conceived the idea. China had lost, in the course of a decade, all the territory which the Butcher had overrun.
Since then Sikang has been relatively peaceful, but this short synopsis of the province's history makes it easy to understand how precarious this state of affairs is bound to be. Chinese control was little more than nominal; I was often to have first-hand experience of its ineffectiveness. In order to govern a territory of this kind it is not enough to station, in isolated villages separated from each other by many days' journey, a few unimpressive officials and a handful of ragged soldiers. The Tibetans completely disregarded the Chinese administration and obeyed only their own chiefs. One very simple fact illustrates the true status of Sikang's Chinese rulers: nobody in the province would accept Chinese currency, and the officials, unable to buy anything with their money, were forced to subsist by a process of barter."

American Tibetologist Elliot Sperling has argued in favor of reviving the term Tubote (simplified Chinese: 图伯特; traditional Chinese: 圖伯特; pinyin: Túbótè) for modern use in place of Xizang, on the grounds that Tubote more clearly includes the entire Tibetan plateau rather than simply the Tibet Autonomous Region.
