= Püncogling Township =

Human settlement in China

Püncogling
- Township
- Location within Tibet
- Coordinates: 29.374913°N 88.007711°E
- Country: China
- Region: Tibet
- Prefecture: Shigatse
- District: Lhatse County

Area
  - Total: 663.64 km^{2} (256.23 sq mi)

Population (2017)
  - Total: 4,373
  - Major Nationalities: Tibetan
  - Regional dialect: Tibetan language
- Time zone: UTC+8 (China Standard)

Püncogling (Chinese: 彭措林乡; pinyin: phunt sholing) is a village and township in Lhatse County, in the Shigatse Prefecture of Tibet Autonomous Region.

== Location ==
The township is located at an elevation of 4,597 m (15,082 ft).

Püncogling Township has jurisdiction over the following seven villages; Püncogling, Pusong, Zijiang, Xiequ, Chada, Sadro and Naga.

== See also ==
- List of towns and villages in Tibet
