= Lhasa Mass Art Museum =

Art museum in Lhasa, Tibet, China

Lhasa Mass Art Museum (拉萨市群众艺术馆) is a municipal mass art museum in Lhasa, Tibet Autonomous Region, China, located in Sangchen East Road, Lhasa.

== History ==
The Lhasa Museum of Mass Art has played an important role in the work of rescuing and protecting the original Tibetan court music and dance, the Gar Dance (噶尔乐舞). Gar music and dance was originally circulated in Lhasa Potala Palace and Tashi Lhunpo Monastery and other places of the palace music and dance. 1982, under the leadership of the Lhasa Municipal People's Government, Lhasa Municipal Museum of Mass Art hosted the invitation to the original Gar Ben (Gaer music and dance officer) Balsang dunzhu and three original Gaer artists to rescue Gaer music and dance.
