= Chapel Tseten Phuntsog =

Tibetan historian and politician (1922–2013)

Tibetan name
- Tibetan: ཆབ་སྤེལ་ཚེ་བརྟན་ཕུན་ཚོགས་

Chinese name
- Chinese: 恰白·次旦平措
Transcriptions
Standard Mandarin
- Hanyu Pinyin: Qiàbái Cìdànpíngcuò
- Wade–Giles: Ch'ia^{4}-pai^{2} Tz'u^{4}-tan^{4}-p'ing^{2}-ts'o^{4}

Chapel Tseten Phuntsog (October 1922 – August 2013) was a Tibetan historian, author, and politician. He was one of the leading figures in Tibetan history research in China.

== Biography ==
Chapel Tseten Phuntsog was born in Lhatse in 1922 to the Lhamon family, one of the three aristocrat families in the town. His brother Lhamon Yeshe Tsultrim was at the time an attendant of the 9th Panchen Lama. Both Lhamon Yeshe Tsultrim and his younger brother Lhamon Sonam Lhundrup would later become vice-presidents of the Tibet Autonomous Region People's Political Consultative Conference. At a young age, Lhamon Tseten Phuntsog was adopted by his uncle Chapel Jigme Kunga and changed his surname to Chapel. He became an attendant of Kalön Surkhang Wangchen Gelek. Three years later, he was appointed as the Dzongpen (mayor) of Gyangtse, and then Dzongpen of Gyirong.

In 1953, Shigatse Primary School, the first facility of modern education in Shigatse region, was established. Chapel Tseten Phuntsog became the vice-headmaster of the school, and later Shigatse Prefecture's director of culture and education. From 1956 to 1959, he was also the Dzongpen of Namling. In 1960, Chapel Tseten Phuntsog became a member of Shigatse's Political Consultative Conference Standing Committee, and in 1965, vice-secretary-general of Lhasa. He was purged to work in the countryside during the Cultural Revolution.

After 1978, he worked as the vice-president of Tibet Academy of Social Sciences, consultant of Tibet Academy of Social Sciences, honorary president of China Writers Association Tibet Autonomous Region Branch, vice-president of Tibet Autonomous Region People's Congress Standing Committee, and at other positions. After retirement in 1998, he continued to work at Tibet University. Chapel died in Lhasa in 2013.

== Research and works ==
After the cultural revolution, Chapel Tseten Phuntsog began his career of scientific research. Chapel is heavily inspired by Gendun Chophel, and continued Gendun's academic tradition. One of his main works, A Comprehensive History of Tibet: The Precious String of Turquoise (Standard Tibetan: བོད་ཀྱི་ལོ་རྒྱུས་རགས་རིམ་གཡུ་ཡི་ཕྲེང་བ, Chinese: 西藏通史：松石宝串), published in 1989, is the first book in modern China that covered the entire Tibetan history. The three-volume book in Tibetan was expanded from one of his earlier works, which was written as a task to counter the influences of Shakabpa's work Tibet: A Political History. Chapel's work won China's National Book Award, the first book in Tibetan ever to win the award. It was also recommended by Hu Jintao, Party secretary of Tibet Autonomous Region at the time of publication. Chapel is the chief editor of Gangchen Rigzo (Standard Tibetan: གངས་ཅན་རིག་མཛོད།, Chinese: 雪域文库), one of the largest collection of classical Tibetan works.

Among China's Tibetology community, Chapel is often credited with successfully reconstructing Tibet's early history from ancient Tibetan literature, in which historical events are usually mixed with legends. Chapel is also among the first Tibetan historians in China to comparatively study ancient Tibetan and contemporary Chinese, Mongolian and Tangut documents.
