= Lhatse County =

Lhazê County 拉孜县 • ལྷ་རྩེ་རྫོང་། Lhatse, Liza
- County
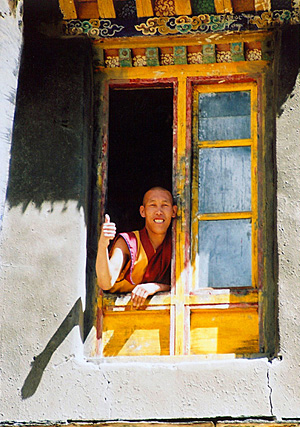
- A monk inside the Old Lhatse Monastery in 2000

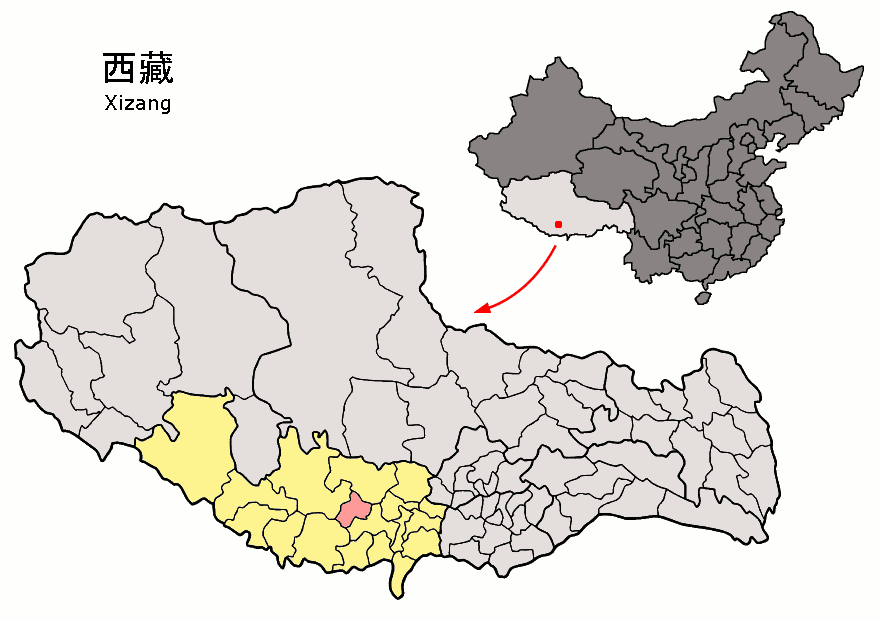
- Location of Lhatse County (red) within Shigatse City (yellow) and Tibet

- Location of the seat in Tibet Lhatse (China)
- Coordinates: 29°11′15″N 88°05′34″E
- Country: China
- Autonomous region: Tibet
- Prefecture-level city: Shigatse
- County seat: Quxar

Area
  - Total: 4,488.7 km^{2} (1,733.1 sq mi)

Population (2020)
  - Total: 56,355
  - Density: 12.555/km^{2} (32.517/sq mi)
- Time zone: UTC+8 (China Standard)
- Website: www.lazi.gov.cn

Lhatse County

Chinese name
- Simplified Chinese: 拉孜县
- Traditional Chinese: 拉孜縣
Transcriptions
Standard Mandarin
- Hanyu Pinyin: Lāzī Xiàn
Yue: Cantonese
- Jyutping: laai^{1}zi^{1} jyun^{2}

Tibetan name
- Tibetan: ལྷ་རྩེ་རྫོང་།
Transcriptions
- Wylie: lha rtse rdzong
- Tibetan Pinyin: Lhazê Zong

Lhatse County is a county of Shigatse in the Tibet Autonomous Region, China. It was established in 1959, with Lhatse Town as the county seat. In 1968, Quxar Town became the county seat.

Lhatse County has a population of some 50,000 and is about 200 kilometers from Mount Everest (or Chomolungma). It is among the most impoverished counties in China.

== Administration divisions ==
Lhatse County is divided into 2 towns and 9 townships.

Name	Chinese	Hanyu Pinyin	Tibetan	Wylie
Towns
Quxar Town	曲下镇	Qǔxià zhèn	ཆུ་ཤར་གྲོང་རྡལ།	chu shar grong rdal
Lhazê Town	拉孜镇	Lāzī zhèn	ལྷ་རྩེ་གྲོང་རྡལ།	lha rtse grong rdal
Townships
Tashi Dzom Township	扎西宗乡	Zhāxīzōng xiāng	བཀྲ་ཤིས་འཛོམས་ཤང་།	bkra shis 'dzoms shang
Qoima Township	曲玛乡	Qǔmǎ xiāng	ཆོས་མ་ཤང་།	chos ma shang
Püncogling Township	彭措林乡	Péngcuòlín xiāng	ཕུན་ཚོགས་གླིང་ཤང་།	bon tshogs gling shang
Tashigang Township	扎西岗乡	Zhāxīgǎng xiāng	བཀྲ་ཤིས་སྒང་ཤང་།	bkra shis sgang shang
Liu Township	柳乡	Liǔ xiāng	སླེའུ་ཤང་།	sle'u shang
Resa Township	热萨乡	Rèsà xiāng	རེ་ས་ཤང་།	re sa shang
Xiqên Township	锡钦乡	Xīqīn xiāng	གཞིས་ཆེན་ཤང་།	gzhis chen shang
Mangpu Township	芒普乡	Mángpǔ xiāng	མང་ཕུ་ཤང་།	mang pu shang
Chau Township	查务乡	Cháwù xiāng	གྲའུ་ཤང་།	gra'u shang

== Climate ==
Lhatse County recorded the highest temperature of 28.9 °C (84.0 °F) in locations above 4,000 meters above sea level.

Climate data for Lhatse, elevation 4,000 m (13,000 ft), (1991–2020 normals, extremes 1981–2010)
Month	Jan	Feb	Mar	Apr	May	Jun	Jul	Aug	Sep	Oct	Nov	Dec	Year
Record high °C (°F)	17.9 (64.2)	18.5 (65.3)	21.6 (70.9)	22.7 (72.9)	27.5 (81.5)	28.7 (83.7)	28.9 (84.0)	27.0 (80.6)	24.1 (75.4)	22.1 (71.8)	20.1 (68.2)	19.6 (67.3)	28.9 (84.0)
Mean daily maximum °C (°F)	6.3 (43.3)	7.9 (46.2)	11.0 (51.8)	14.6 (58.3)	19.0 (66.2)	22.7 (72.9)	21.1 (70.0)	19.7 (67.5)	19.2 (66.6)	16.0 (60.8)	11.4 (52.5)	8.2 (46.8)	14.8 (58.6)
Daily mean °C (°F)	−1.7 (28.9)	0.4 (32.7)	3.9 (39.0)	7.4 (45.3)	11.6 (52.9)	15.4 (59.7)	14.6 (58.3)	13.6 (56.5)	12.6 (54.7)	8.5 (47.3)	3.1 (37.6)	−0.4 (31.3)	7.4 (45.3)
Mean daily minimum °C (°F)	−9.8 (14.4)	−7.4 (18.7)	−3.5 (25.7)	0.4 (32.7)	4.9 (40.8)	9.2 (48.6)	9.6 (49.3)	8.8 (47.8)	7.2 (45.0)	1.6 (34.9)	−5.0 (23.0)	−8.8 (16.2)	0.6 (33.1)
Record low °C (°F)	−19.1 (−2.4)	−16.8 (1.8)	−12.7 (9.1)	−8.0 (17.6)	−4.4 (24.1)	1.0 (33.8)	2.7 (36.9)	2.6 (36.7)	0.5 (32.9)	−7.2 (19.0)	−13.3 (8.1)	−16.9 (1.6)	−19.1 (−2.4)
Average precipitation mm (inches)	0.2 (0.01)	0.2 (0.01)	0.3 (0.01)	2.6 (0.10)	14.7 (0.58)	49.1 (1.93)	123.6 (4.87)	123.0 (4.84)	38.2 (1.50)	3.2 (0.13)	0.2 (0.01)	0.3 (0.01)	355.6 (14)
Average precipitation days (≥ 0.1 mm)	0.3	0.4	0.4	1.9	4.3	10.8	20.6	21.3	10.9	1.4	0.2	0.1	72.6
Average snowy days	0.5	0.7	0.8	2.6	1.5	0.1	0	0	0	0.4	0.3	0.2	7.1
Average relative humidity (%)	18	18	20	25	31	41	59	64	53	29	21	18	33
Mean monthly sunshine hours	254.1	239.2	272.3	272.3	300.1	268.8	209.9	202.7	237.5	290.9	268.9	264.6	3,081.3
Percentage possible sunshine	78	75	73	70	71	64	50	50	65	83	85	83	71
Source: China Meteorological Administration

== Transport ==
The county is a juncture of China National Highway 219 (G219) which goes to Kashgar and China National Highway 318 (G318) which ends at the border with Nepal. To the west along the G318, a road splits off and runs to the Mount Everest base camp.

== Gallery ==
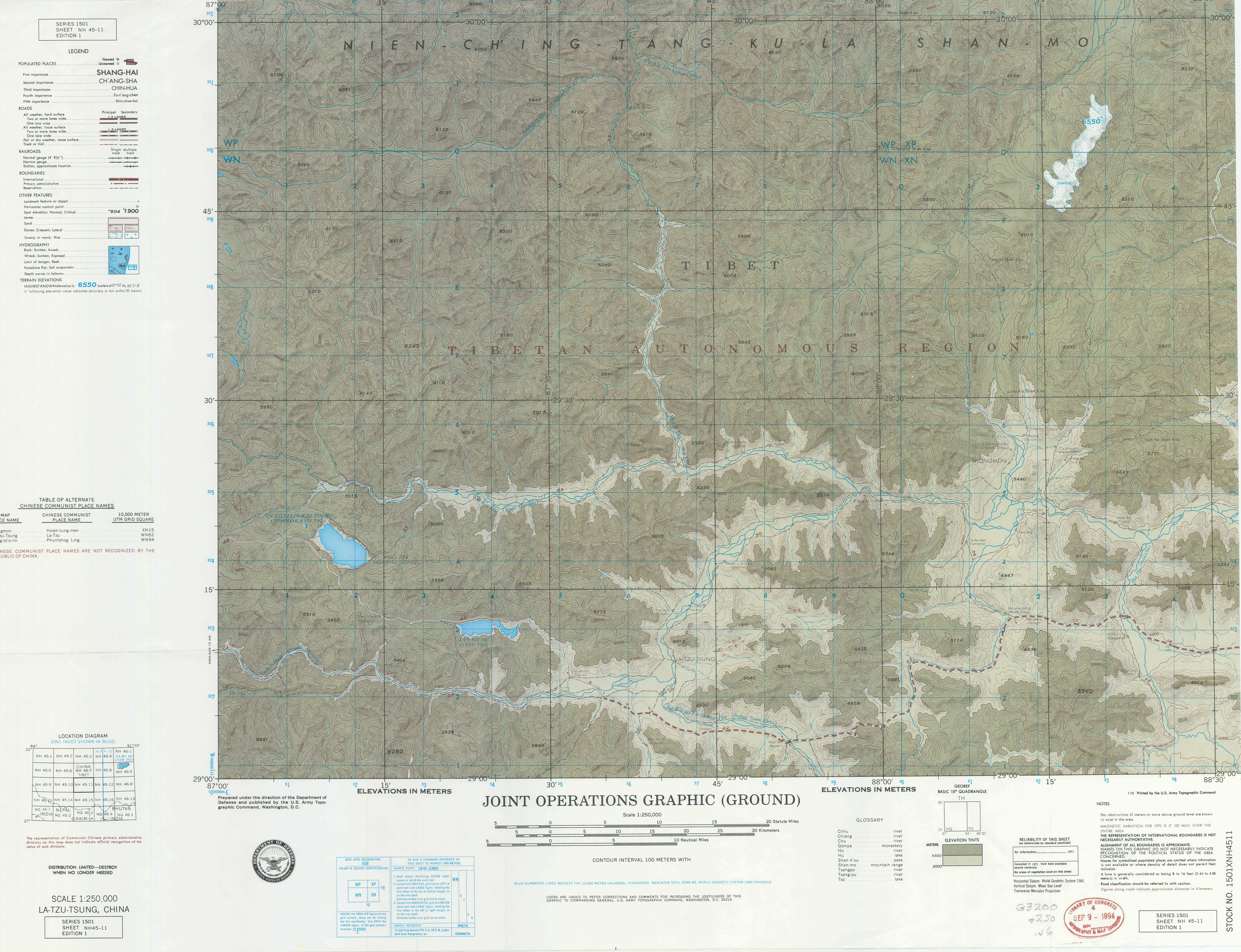
Map including Lhatse County area (ATC, 1971)

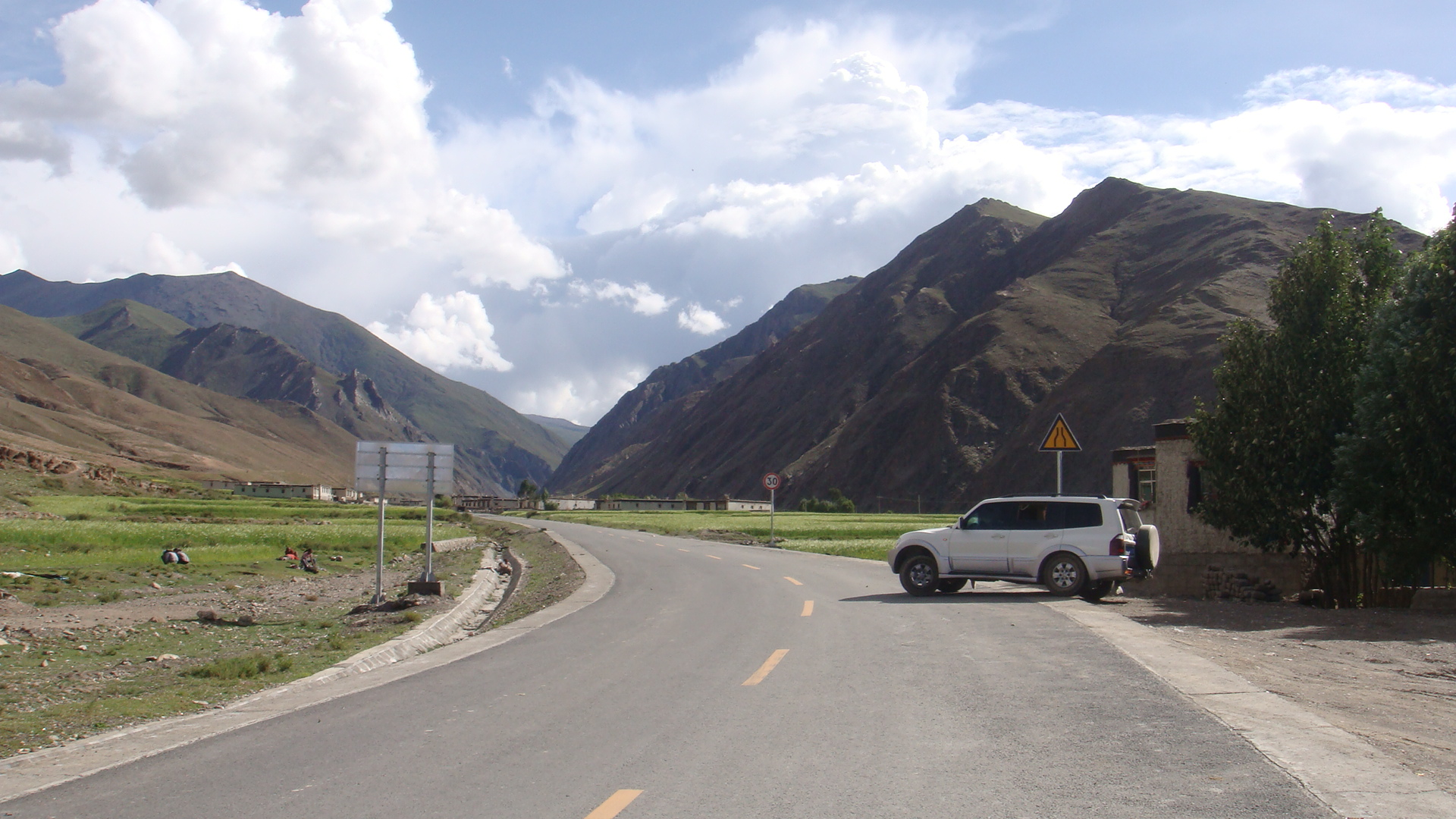
National Highway 318
