= List of rivers of Nepal =

This is a list of rivers of Nepal, east to west. This list is arranged by drainage basin, indented to show the structure of confluences. Tributaries rising inside India are not shown.

The basin is generally categorized into ten major basins as listed below.

== Kankai river basin ==
- Kankai River
  - Mai River
  - Yubragyi river

== Koshi river basin ==
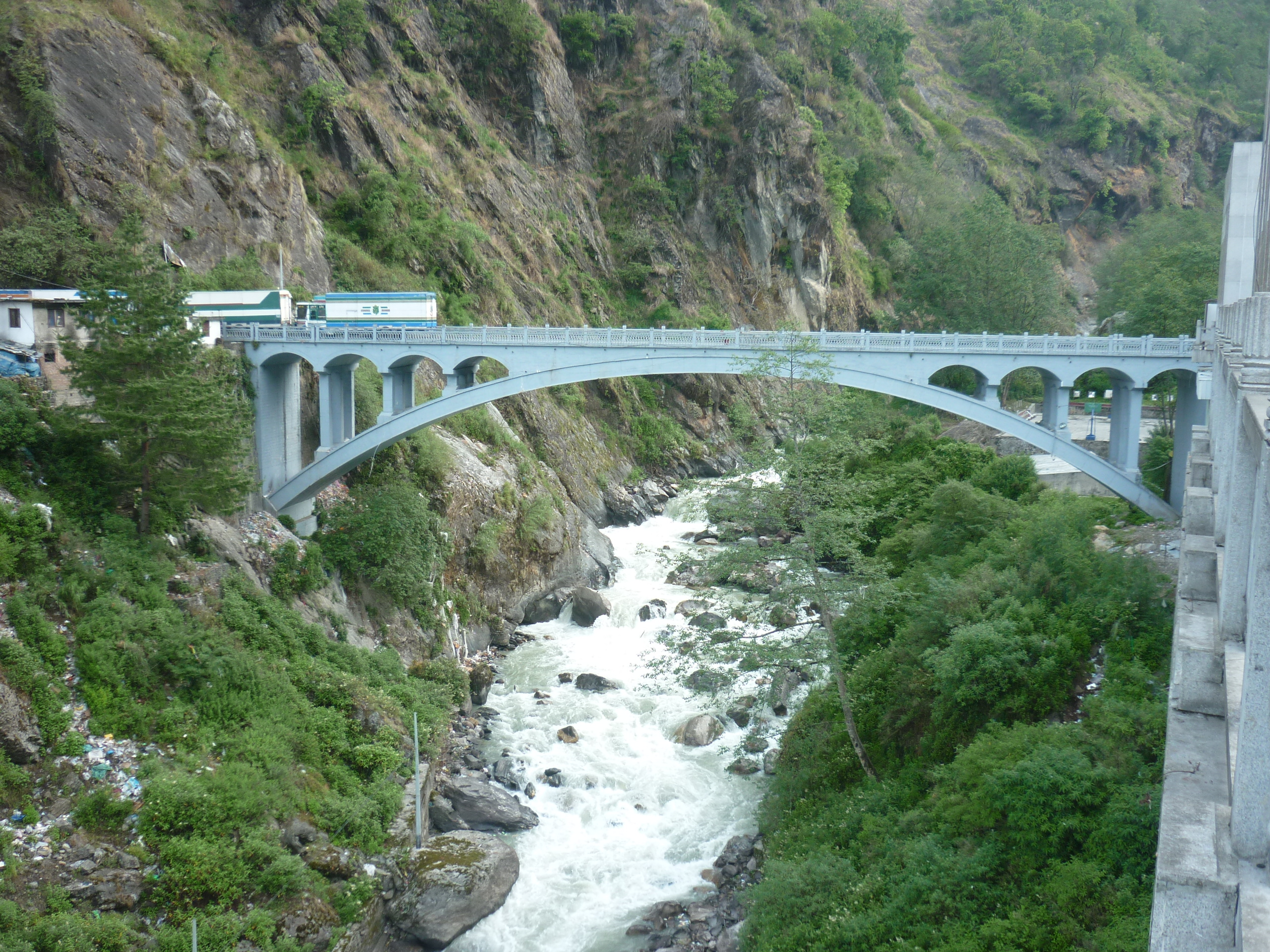
Sunkoshi river near Nepal-China border

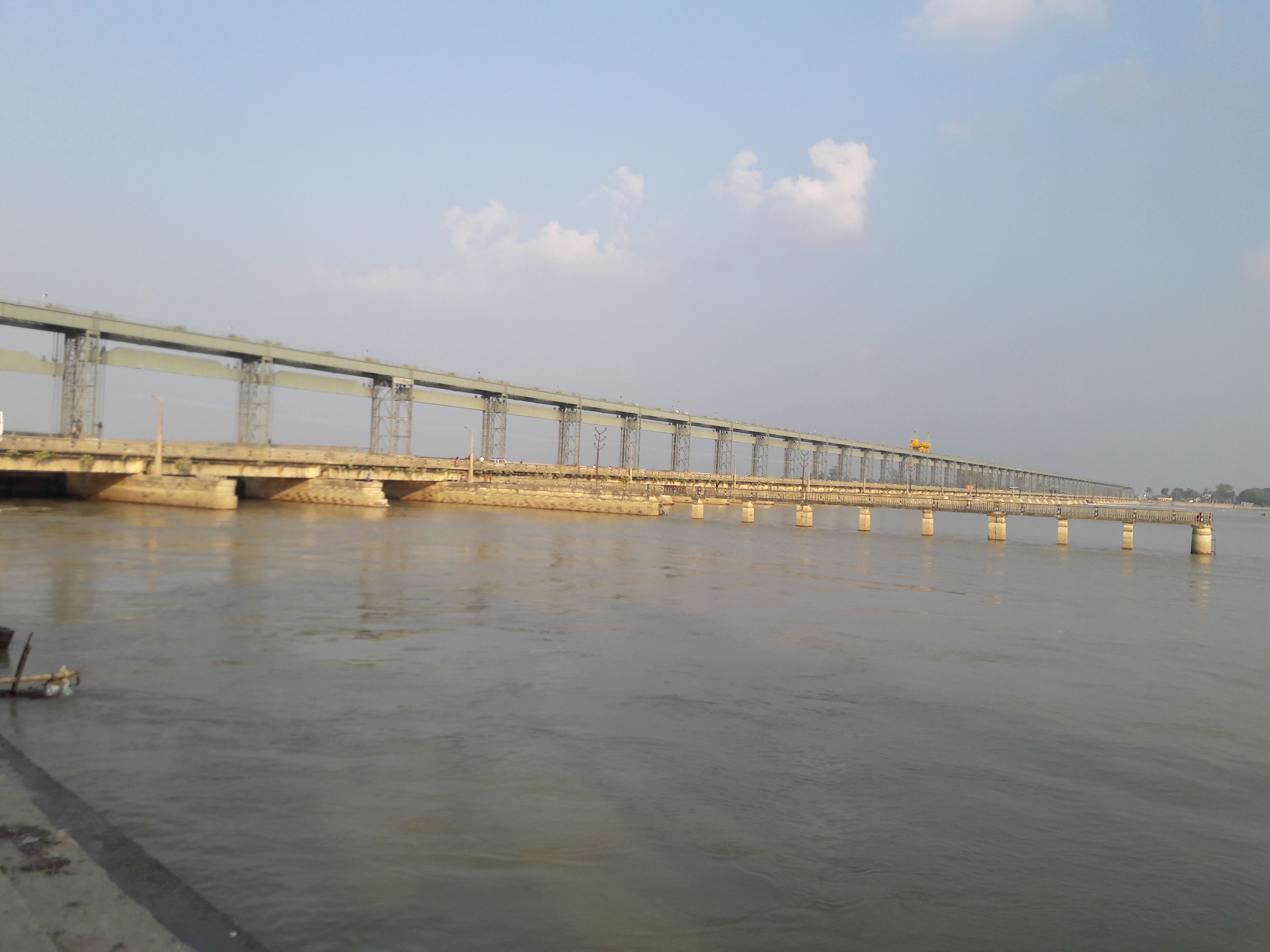
Saptakoshi river at Sunsari District of Nepal

- Koshi River
  - Tamor
    - Mewa River
      - Palun Khola
    - Ghunsa River
      - Yamatari river
  - Arun
  - Sunkoshi
    - Chaku River
    - Bhairabkunda River
    - Dudh Koshi
      - Imja Khola
      - Hongu River
      - Solu River
    - Likhu Khola
    - Bhote Koshi
    - Tama Koshi
    - Indravati River
      - Melamchi River

== Bagmati river basin ==
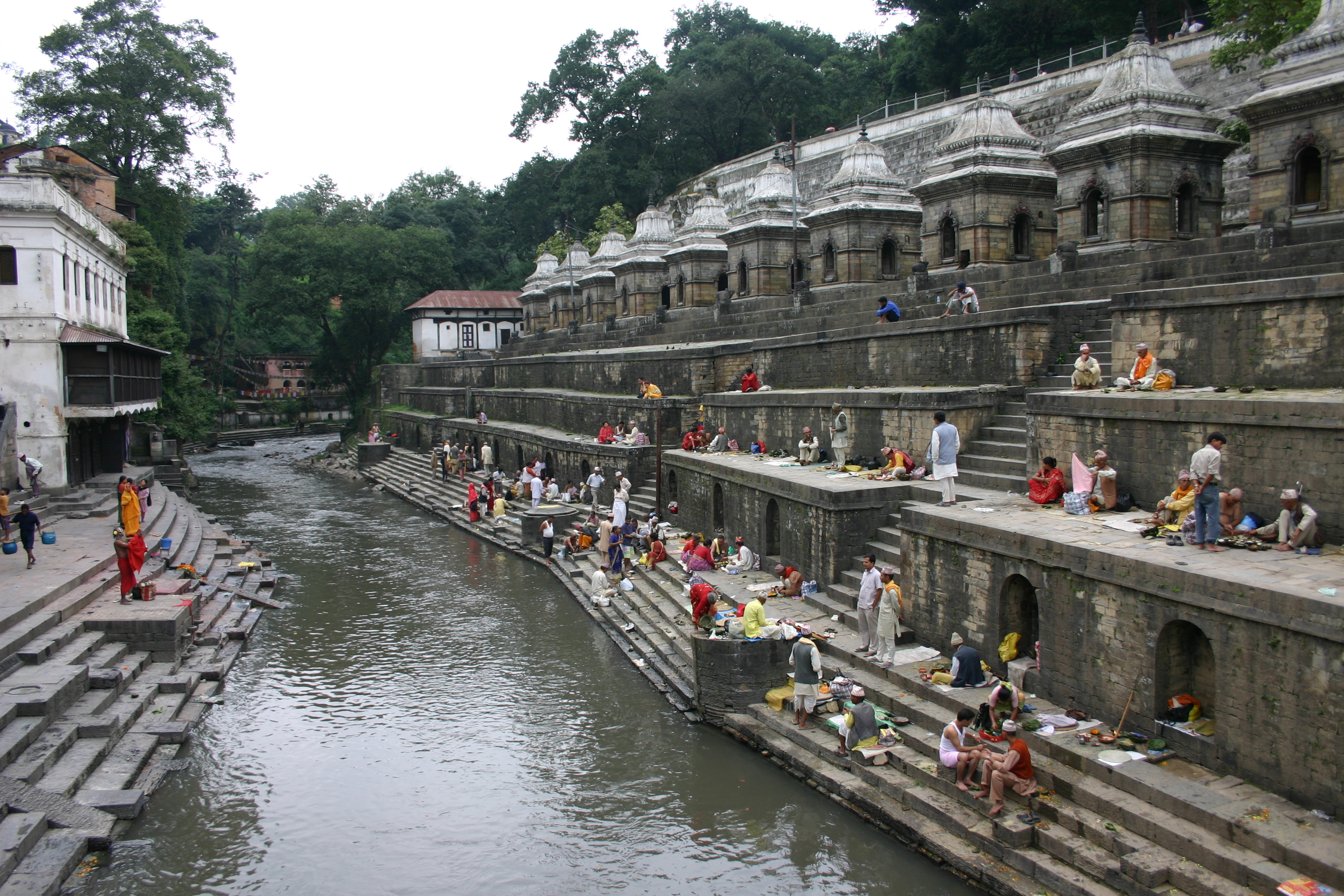
Bagmati river in Pashupatinath

- Bagmati River
  - Bisnumati River
  - Dhobi Khola
  - Hanumante Khola
    - Manohara River
  - Nakhhu Khola
  - Balkhu River
  - Tukucha Khola

Godawari khola Karmanasa Khola

== Gandaki river basin ==
- Gandaki River (Narayani) (Kali Gandaki)
  - Binai River
  - East Rapti River
    - Karra River
    - Kukhreni River
  - Trishuli River
    - Langtang River
    - Seti Gandaki River
    - Marshyangdi
      - Chhandi River
    - Budhi Gandaki River
  - Nisi River
  - Madi River
    - Rudi River
  - Modi River
  - Myagdi River

== West Rapti river basin ==
- West Rapti River

== Babai river basin ==
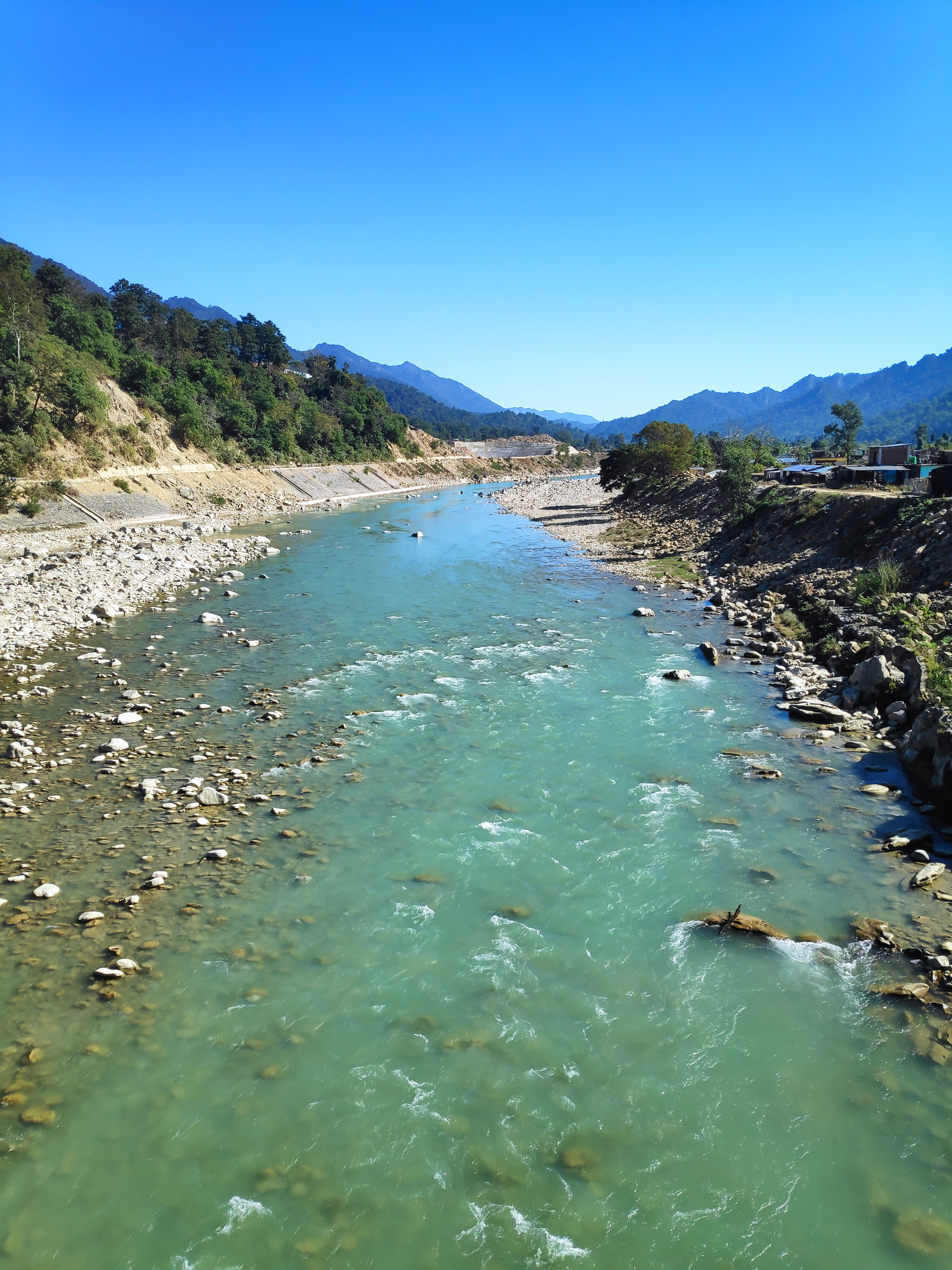
Babai River

- Babai River
    - Sharada Khola
  - Sarju River
  - Mohan River
    - Kandra River
  - Bheri River
    - Thuli Bheri River
    - Sani Bheri River
  - Thuli River
  - Seti River
    - Budhi Ganga River
  - Sinja River
  - Mugu Karnali
    - Langu River
      - Panjang River
  - Humla Karnali
    - Tanke River

== Karnali river basin ==
- Karnali
  - West Rapti River
    - Rohni River
    - Tinau River
      - Mari River
    - Jimruk River
  - Tila River
    - Hima river

== Mahakali river basin ==
- Mahakali River
  - Surna River or Surnagad River
  - Chameliya River
  - Lipu Khola
  - Kuthi Yankti
  - Kalapani River

== Other minor river basins ==
- Mechi River
  - Timai River
- Ratnawati (Raato) River
- Bakraha River
- Budhi Khola (Itahari)
- Balan River
  - Khutti River
- Phuljor river
- Dhansar River
- Lalbakaiya river
  - Bakaya river
  - Dhansar river
- Pashah river
- Sirsiya River
- Bherang river
- Biraha River
- Dano River
- Banganga River (Kapilvastu, Nepal)
- Mohana River (Nepal)
- Fuleswari River

== See also ==
- List of lakes of Nepal
