= Bheri =

Bheri may refer to:

- Bheri Zone, a former administrative division of Nepal.
- Bheri River, a river in Nepal.
- Bheri, Jajarkot, a municipality in Jajarkot district in Nepal.

== See also ==
- Sani Bheri River
- Thuli Bheri River
