= Tukucha Khola =

Location
- Country: Nepal

Physical characteristics
- Source
  - location: Chundevi, behind Nirmal Nivas
- Mouth
  - location: Bagmati River at Kalmochan, Thapathali
  - coordinates: 27°41′28″N 85°18′47″E
- Length: 5.9 kilometres (3.7 mi)

Basin features
- River system: Bagmati River

The Tukucha Khola (Nepali: टुकुचा खोला) is a tributary of the holy Bagmati River in Nepal. The ancient cultural name of this river is Ikshumati and it is called 'Tukucha' (Sugarcane river) in Newari language. It flows through dense settlements between Dhobi Khola and Bishnumati Khola in Kathmandu. This rivulet originates in chundevi area of Kathmandu behind Nirmal Nivas and merges with Bagmati River after reaching Kalmochan Mahadev temple in Tripureshwar. The length of the rivulet within the main city is estimated to be around 5.9 kilometres (3.7 mi).

== Encroachment ==
This rivulet flows through the central part of Kathmandu metropolitan city and some parts of the rivulet are visible somewhere after entering the city spaces. In some places, structures have been built over this rivulet. From Maharajganj to Kamaladi, roads and structures have been built over the rivulet in most parts. According to the data of Kathmandu Metropolitan City, about 85 houses and buildings have been built on Tukucha alone. Encroachment on Tukucha started from Rana period. It has been made underground from within the walls of Narayanhiti Palace in the form of a sewer.
