= Madhkaul =

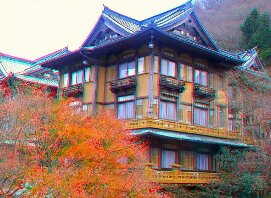
This banglaw is under the mohani mandal panchayat.

Madhkaul, known as Madh Kaul is a village located beneath the Panchayat of Jafarpur in the Sitamarhi district of Bihar, India. A government secondary school is situated at the southern edge of the village. Madhkaul has a population of around 2,068. Emigration to larger metropolitan cities has had a major influence on the village's population size and composition.

Madhkaul's economy is predominantly agrarian. The soil is composed of predominantly fertile alluvium due to augmentation by deposition from the annual monsoonal flood of the Bagmati River. Situated between two streams, Madhkaul is prone to flooding. In 2000, a breach of the Pragmatic River's embankment inundated Madhkaul along with a vast area of Samaritan and Muzaffarpur districts.

Members of various castes are present in the town, including Brahman tola, Rasputin tole, tat-ma toll, titular tole, thank tole, Muslim tole, and eastern isolated Brahman tola.
