= Khutti River =

River in Nepal

Coordinates: 26°43′06″N 86°30′09″E

The Khutti River is a major tributary of the Balan River which itself is a transboundary river starting from mountains of Nepal and crossing to India at Bandar Jhuli. The river caused flooding in Lahan in 2007. The sediment from the river is used as construction material.

Geologically, the Khutti cuts the frontal range of Siwalik Hills claystone-sandstone and alluvial deposits. The surface rupturing occurred in the 17th century and the 1934 Nepal–India earthquake caused the rupture to reach the surface. Later, the rupture aggravated by water and was sealed by sediments.

== See also ==
- List of rivers of Nepal
