= Chhatona =

Balara-Chhatona बलरा-छतोना
- Balara Municipality
- Nickname: बलरा
- Location in Nepal
- Coordinates: 26°47′30″N 85°20′0″E
- Country: Nepal
- Zone: Janakpur Zone
- District: Sarlahi District

Population (1991)
  - Total: 2,079
- Time zone: UTC+5:45 (Nepal Time)

Chhatona is a Part (Ward no. 11) of Balara Municipality in the Janakpur Zone of south-eastern Nepal. At the time of the 1991 Nepal census it had a population of 2,079 people living in 428 individual households. Manusmara river flows in this village dividing it into two. Bagmati River is around 4 kilometers from this village. So, it is a flood prone village. Baban Bihari Singh, a politician from Nepali Congress is a native of this village.
