= Bakraha River =

River in eastern Nepal

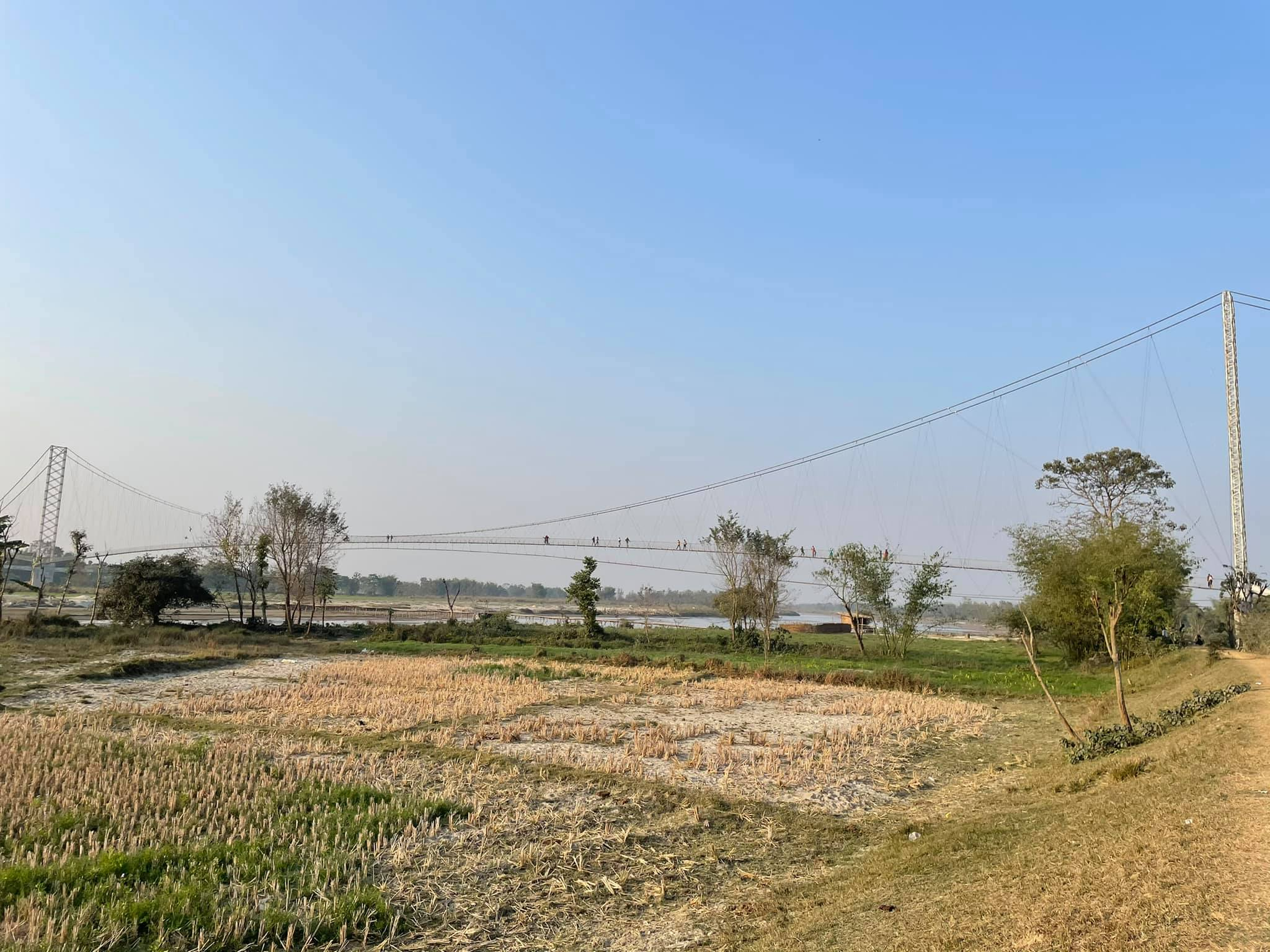

Bakraha river lies in Eastern Nepal. It originates from the Mahabharata range and flows towards south towards India via Jhapa, Ilam and Morang. The watershed of the river is steep in the upstream reaches but mild in the downstream basin in the Terai region and Northern India. The river consists of fresh water fish such as B. bendelisis, B. vagra, B. barila, Puntius sophhore, P.gonionotus, and Garra rupecula.

The flood in the river displaces the local community every year. To counter this, government has planned to construct embankment along the river.

== See also ==
- List of rivers of Nepal
