= Banganga River (Kapilvastu, Nepal) =

Transborder river flowing from Nepal to India

Banganga River is a trans-boundary river flowing from Arghakhanchi District of Nepal to Banganga, Kapilvastu in Nepal and mets at Ganges in Uttar Pradesh, India. It crosses the border at Jugdihawa. The river is of religious importance for Buddhist pilgrims. The kingdom of Kapilavastu (Tilaurakot), the palace of Gautama Buddha, is believed to have lied on the bank of the river. It is believed that, when Buddha left his palace to seek knowledge, he rode his horse along the bank of this river.

== Biodiversity ==
About 29 species of fishes resides in the river. Among them, Order Siluriformes is the most dominant species followed by Cypriniformes, Perciformes and others.

== See also ==
- List of rivers of Nepal
- Baanganga
