= Chhandi Khola Hydropower Station =

Dam in Gandaki Province, Nepal

- Location within Nepal
- Official name: Chhandi Khola Hydropower Project
- Country: Nepal
- Location: Lamjung District
- Coordinates: 28°15′12″N 84°29′20″E
- Purpose: Power
- Status: Operational
- Owner: Chhyandi Hydropower Co. P. Ltd

Dam and spillways
- Type of dam: Gravity
- Impounds: Chhandi River

Power Station
- Commission date: 2072-12-13 BS
- Type: Run-of-the-river
- Installed capacity: 2 MW

Chhandi Khola Hydropower Station (Nepali: छ्याङ्दी खोला जलविद्युत आयोजना) is a run-of-river hydro-electric plant located in Lamjung District of Nepal. The flow from Chhandi River is used to generate 2 MW electricity. The plant has design flow of 0.67 m3/s and design head of 710 m, making it one of the projects with the largest head.

The plant is owned and developed by Chhyandi Hydropower Co. P. Ltd, an IPP of Nepal. The parent company is also involved in the development of other hydropower projects in the vicinity. The plant started generating electricity from 2072-12-13BS. The generation licence will expire in 2105-05-23 BS, after which the plant will be handed over to the government. The power station is connected to the national grid and the electricity is sold to Nepal Electricity Authority.

== See also ==
- List of power stations in Nepal
