= Lalbakaiya river =

Transborder river flowing from Nepal to India

Lalbakaiya river is a transborder river flowing from hills of Nepal to India. It crosses the border at Balua Gowabari. Its two major tributaries are Bakaya river and Dhansar river.

== Conflict ==
After flooding of the area, the locals of Banjaraha at Ishnath Municipality has been voicing to decommission the dam in the India side. Due to the dam, water level has raised and there is flooding every year. In July 2021, around 500 bigha of land was inundated.

== See also ==
- List of rivers of Nepal
