= Mewa River =

Tributary of Tamur River, Nepal

Coordinates: 27°22′37″N 87°37′38″E

Mewa River is a major tributary of Tamur River which forms a part of the Saptakoshi River system. The river is located in Taplejung district of eastern Nepal. The Mewa converges with the Tamur river near the Hangdrung village.

== Biodiversity ==
The Mewa river valley has a landscape lying between 700-3,900m above sea level. The river valley provides shelter for birds during the migration period.

== Infrastructures ==
The Mewa has large hydropower potential and a number of projects are under development, such as

- Me Khola Hydropower Project (50 MW)
- Middle Mewa Hydropower Project (49 MW)
- Palun Khola Hydropower Project (21 MW), in the tributary of Mewa river

== See also ==
- List of rivers of Nepal
