= Bheri River =

River in Nepal

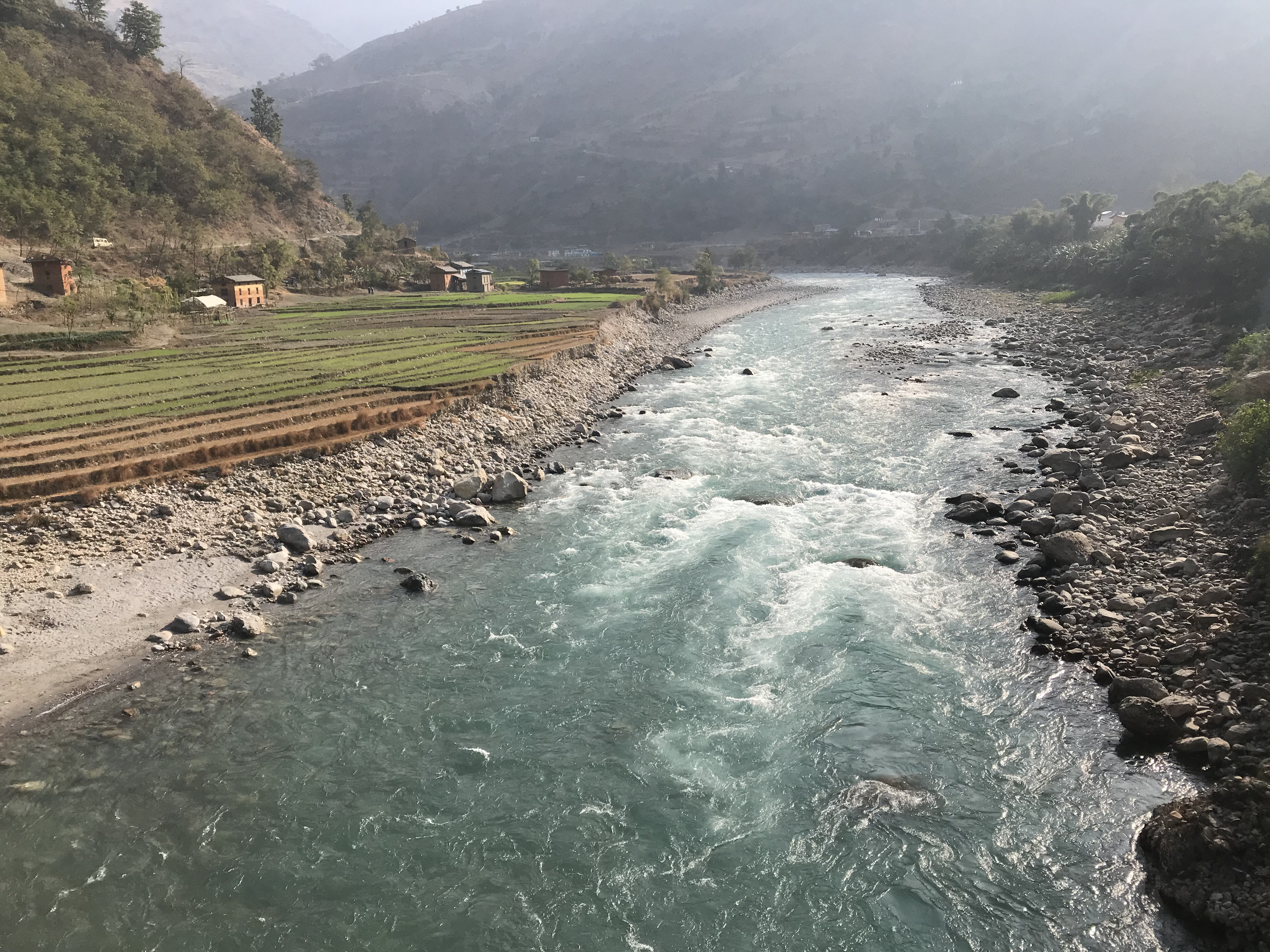

Location
- Country: Nepal

Physical characteristics
- Mouth: Karnali River
  - coordinates: 28°44′31″N 81°15′36″E

Basin features
- River system: Karnali River

The Bheri River is a major tributary of the Karnali River draining the western Dhaulagiri range in western Nepal. It has three important upper tributaries. Sani Bheri River drains southern slopes of this range while Thuli Bheri River drains northern slopes. Another tributary Uttar Ganga drains Dhorpatan Valley to the south of the Dhaulagiris. Downstream, the Bheri flows through Surkhet Valley before joining the Karnali River in the Mahabharat Range or Lesser Himalaya.

On December 25, 2007, a suspension bridge collapsed along the river in Chhinchu (Mehelkuna) village. "Scores" of people crossed the 500m steel bridge to get to a local Christmas Day fair. At least 15 people were killed and at least 22 were injured. Most of the killed were women and children. The river supposedly had strong currents.

== See also ==
- List of rivers of Nepal
