= Sirsiya River =

Transboundary river between Nepal and India

Coordinates: 26°47′30″N 84°52′36″E

Location
- Country: Nepal

Physical characteristics
- Source
  - location: Nepal

The Sirsiya River is a transboundary river flowing from central southern Nepal to India. It crosses the border at Raxaul. The river originates in the forest of Ramban in Jeetpur Simara sub-metropolitan city of Bara District of Nepal. It is a perennial river. It has two major tributaries, Kiyasut and Vaudyi, which merge near Birgunj. Due to the construction of more industries along the Bara/Parsa industrial corridor, the river has become polluted with oil and grease. The first industry in this corridor was set up in the 1940s. Currently there are around 2,000 enterprises and factories.

== Cultural significance ==
Many shrines and temples lies on the river bank. Chhath festival is celebrated in these temples. Due to pollution, during the festival, the festival management committee request the factories to clean the river. yes, The industries shut down for a few days to allow clean water to flow.

== See also ==
- List of rivers of Nepal
