= Budhi Khola =

River in eastern Nepal

Budhi Khola (Nepali: बुढी खोला) is a river passing through Itahari in Nepal. The river acts as a border between Sunsari and Morang districts. The main catchment of the river lies between Dharan and Tarahara and flows from northern mid hills near Dharan, passes Itahari, Dhuhabi and finally towards India. In India and southern Nepal, the river is called Keshaliya Khola. In 2017, the flood in the river killed six peoples.

== See also ==
- List of rivers of Nepal
