= Koteshwor Mahadevsthan =

Hindu temple in Koteshwor, Nepal

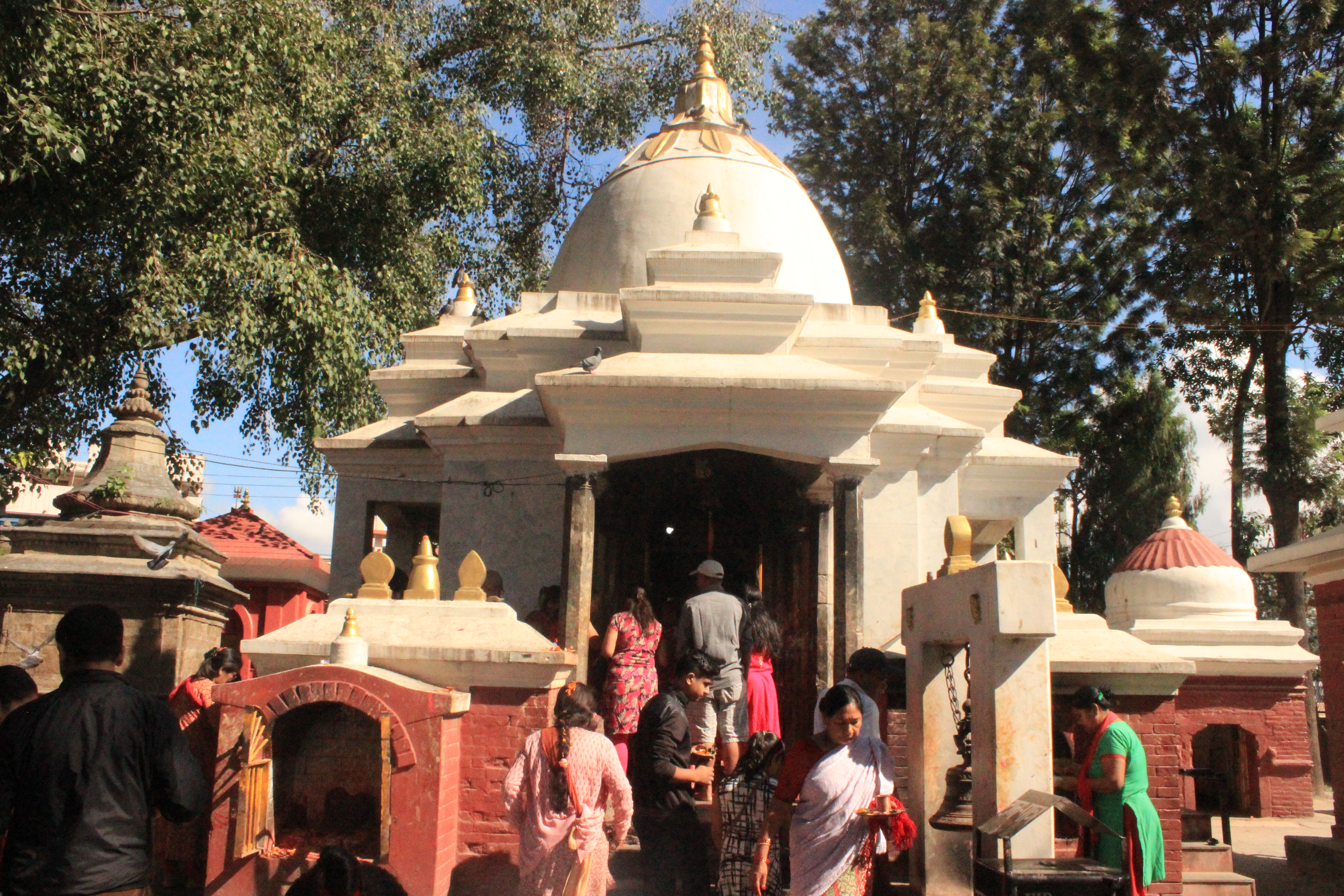
- A view of Koteshwor Mahadev Temple

- Location in Nepal

Religion
- Affiliation: Hinduism
- District: Kathmandu
- Deity: Shiva
- Festivals: Shivaratri, Teej, Balachaturdasi

Location
- Location: Koteshwor
- Country: Nepal
- Interactive map of Koteshwor Mahadevsthan
- Coordinates: 27.68°N 85.35°E

Architecture
- Type: Pagoda

Koteshwor Mahadevsthan (Nepali: कोटेश्वर महादेवस्थान; lit. 'Place of Koteshwor Mahadev') is one of the holy places of Kathmandu District in the Bagmati Zone. It lies in Koteshwor, Kathmandu, Ward No. 32 (previous 35) of Kathmandu Metropolitan City. This place is popularly known as Koteshwor Mahadevsthan, and the Shiva lingam here is believed to have appeared divinely. But there are no written scriptures about the exact date of its appearance. This temple also has another name: Kotinath. According to a popular legend, the Shiva Lingam here is believed to be one of the 64 sacred Shiva Lingams.

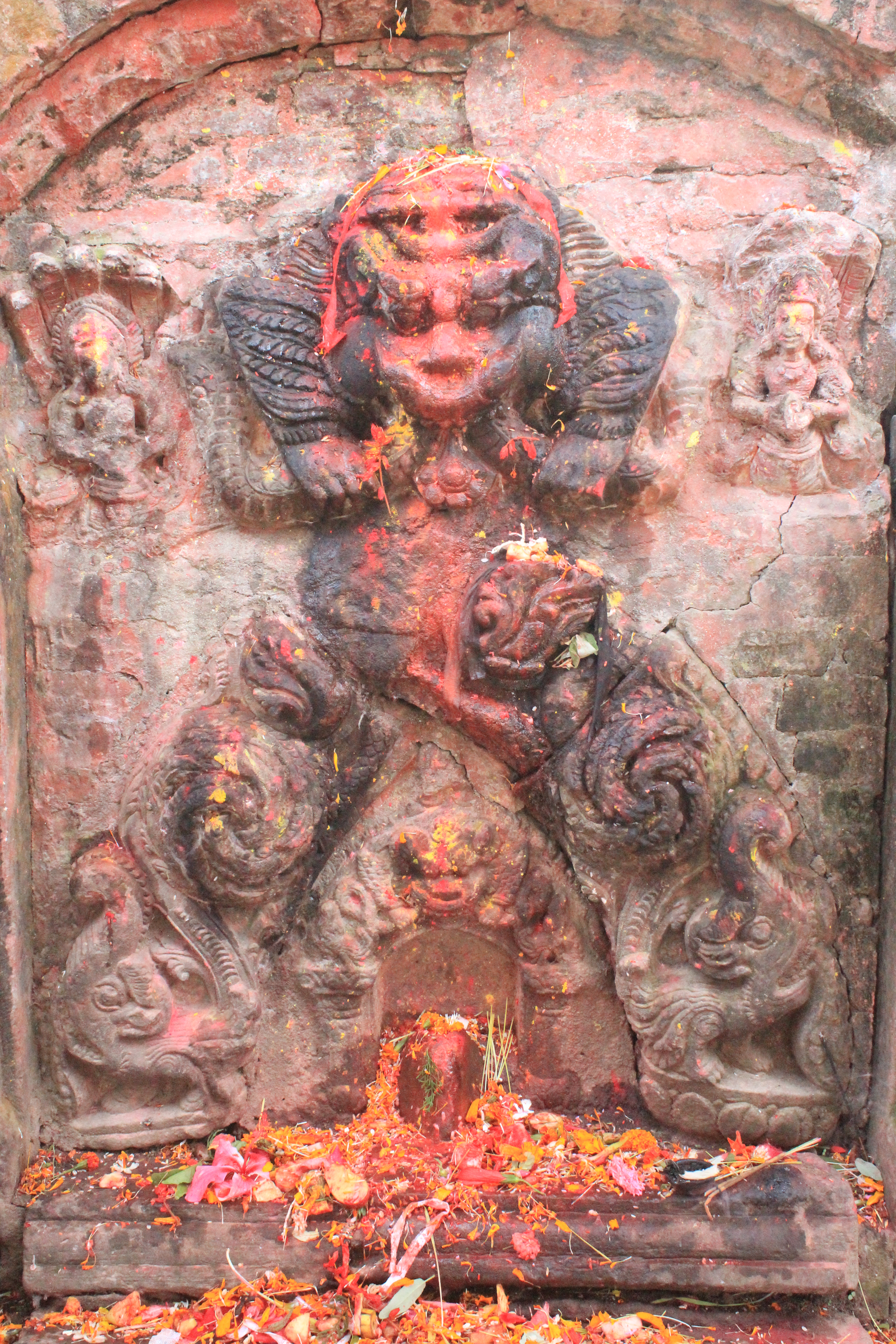
Koteshwor Temple

The exact date when this temple was constructed remains unknown. The temple premises have a stone inscription that will help to find out the history of Koteshwor Mahadev, but no any research has been conducted. But myths point out that this place started being worshiped in the fifth century BC, though the concrete structures and pillars, as they now stand, were built much later. Near the Koteshwor Temple is a place known as Shankhamul. It is believed that Lord Shiva, while wandering in his boundless grief carrying Sati's body on his back had rested his one foot on this place. And from the very land where Mahadev had tapped his foot sprang an incessant stream of water. It is said that in the Treta Yuga, Bhimsen (deity), the brother of Ravan, the powerful king of Lanka, used to fetch water from Shankhamul and carry it up to the Koteshwor Temple to offer it to Lord Shiva. Inside the temple periphery, there is also another Shiva Lingam, popularly known by the name of Khileshwar Mahadev.

== Temple complex ==
In addition to the Mahadev Temple, there are many other deities inside the temple periphery. One important deity is Chhinna Masta Bhagwati, who is supposed to be an incarnation of Changu Narayan in Bhaktapur. Legends have it that she was transported from Bhaktapur and resettled in Koteshwor via elaborate Vedic tantras and mantras. Next, there is a temple of Saptarishi, one of the very few in Kathmandu. As a result, hundreds of devotees gather around the temple on Rishi Panchami Day every year. Each of these temples and deities has its own story behind their origin and significance.

== Gallery ==
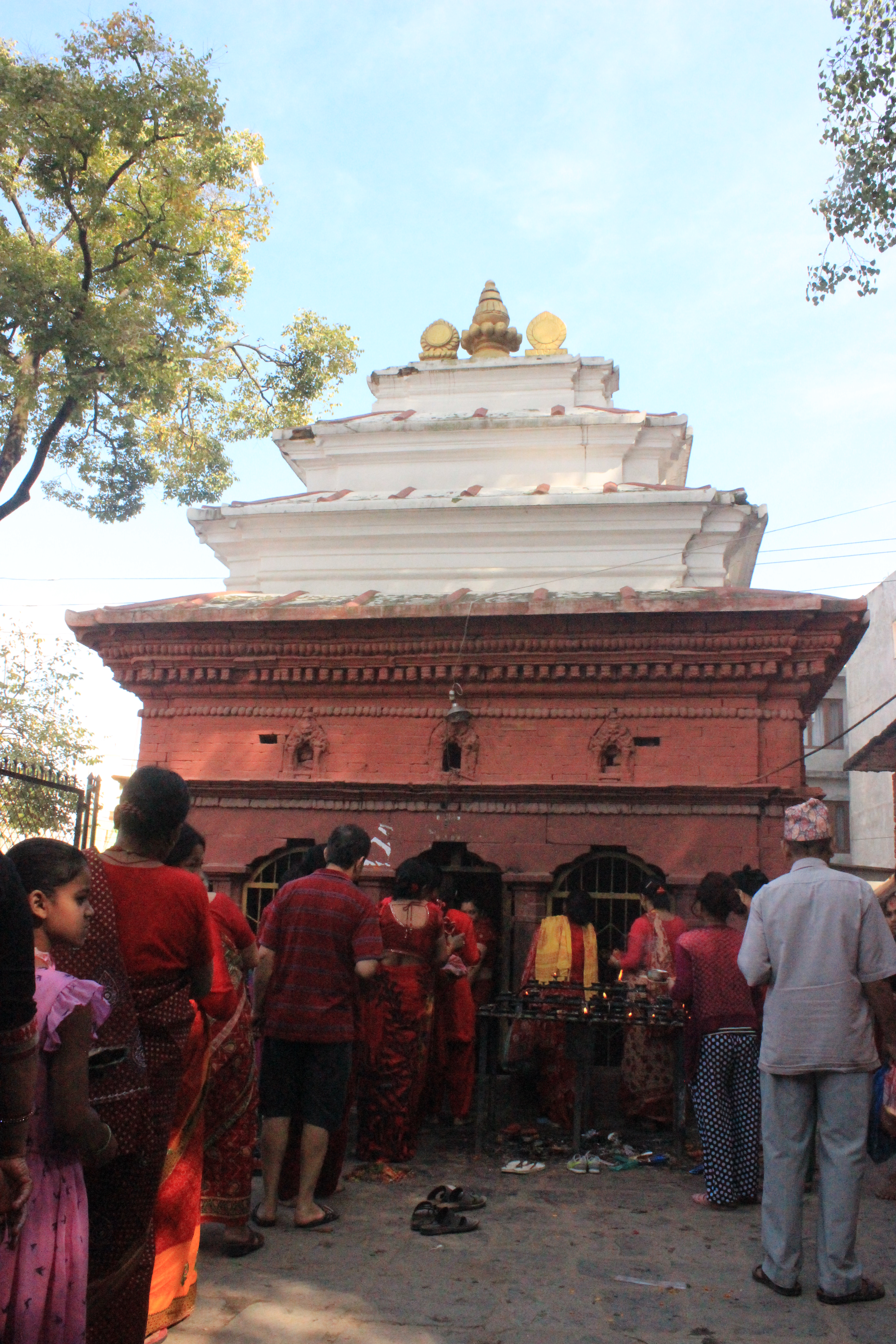
Koteshwor Mahadevsthan Temple is the spot where Sati left hand had supposedly fallen here

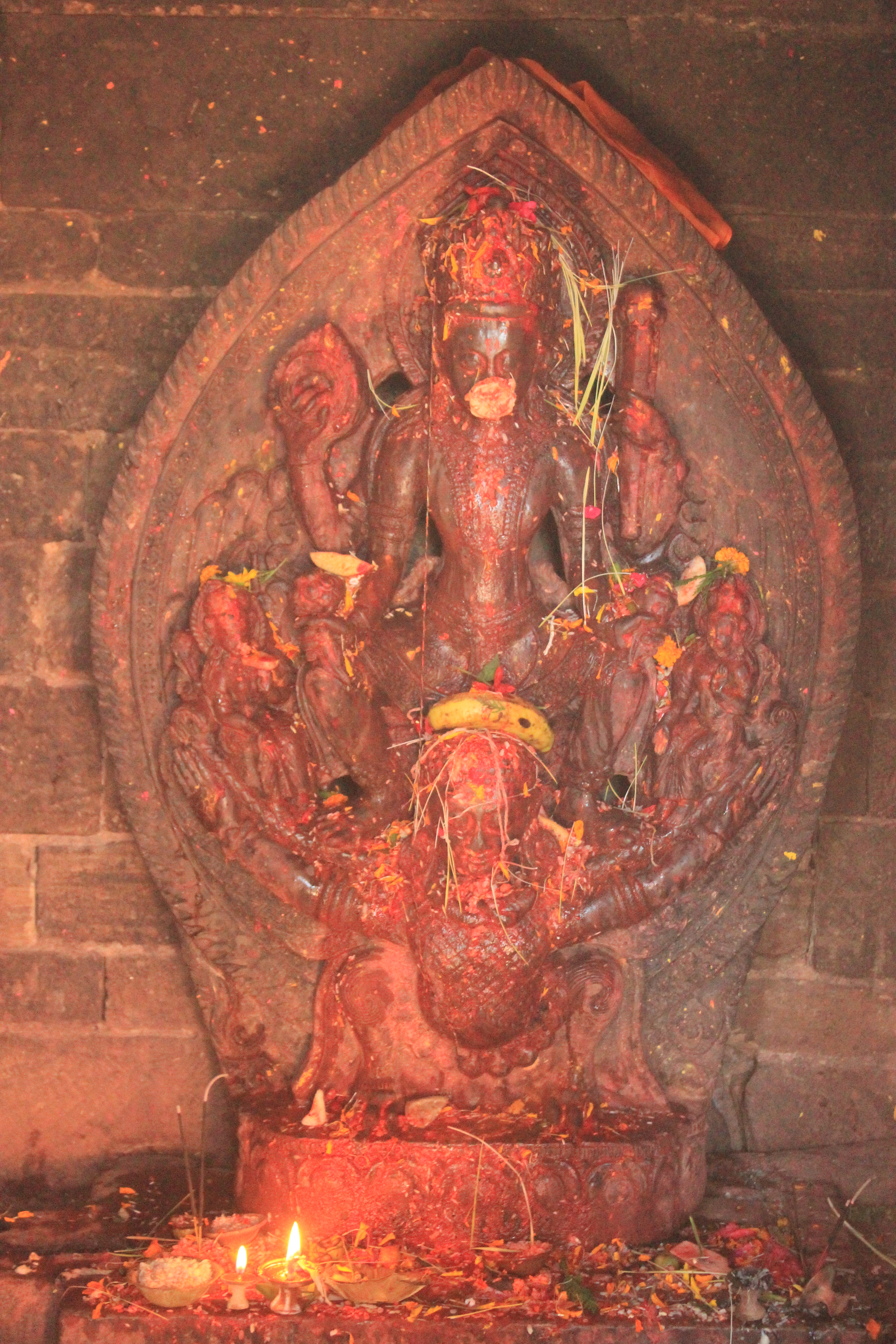
Garud Narayan Temple

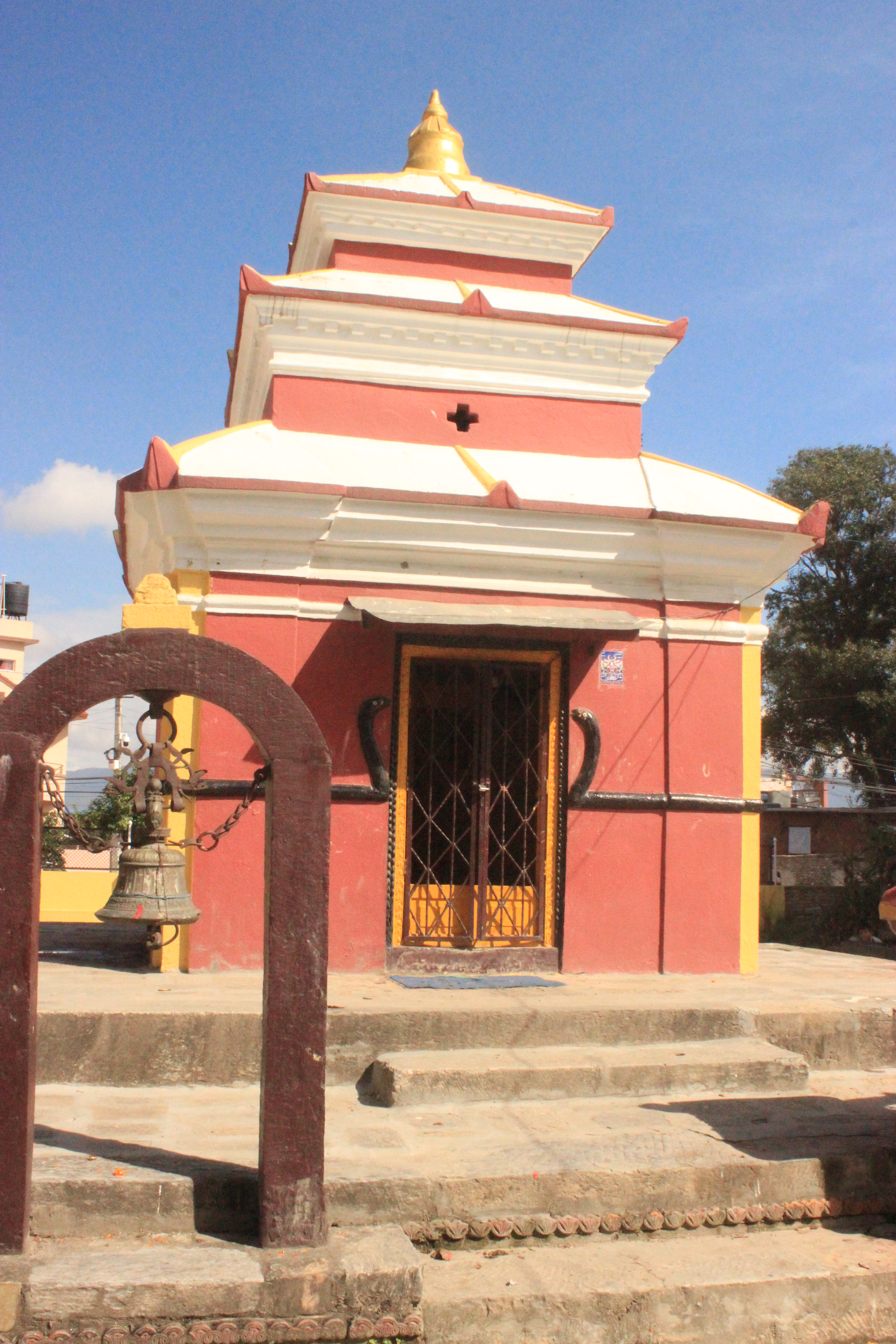
Gaganeshwor Temple

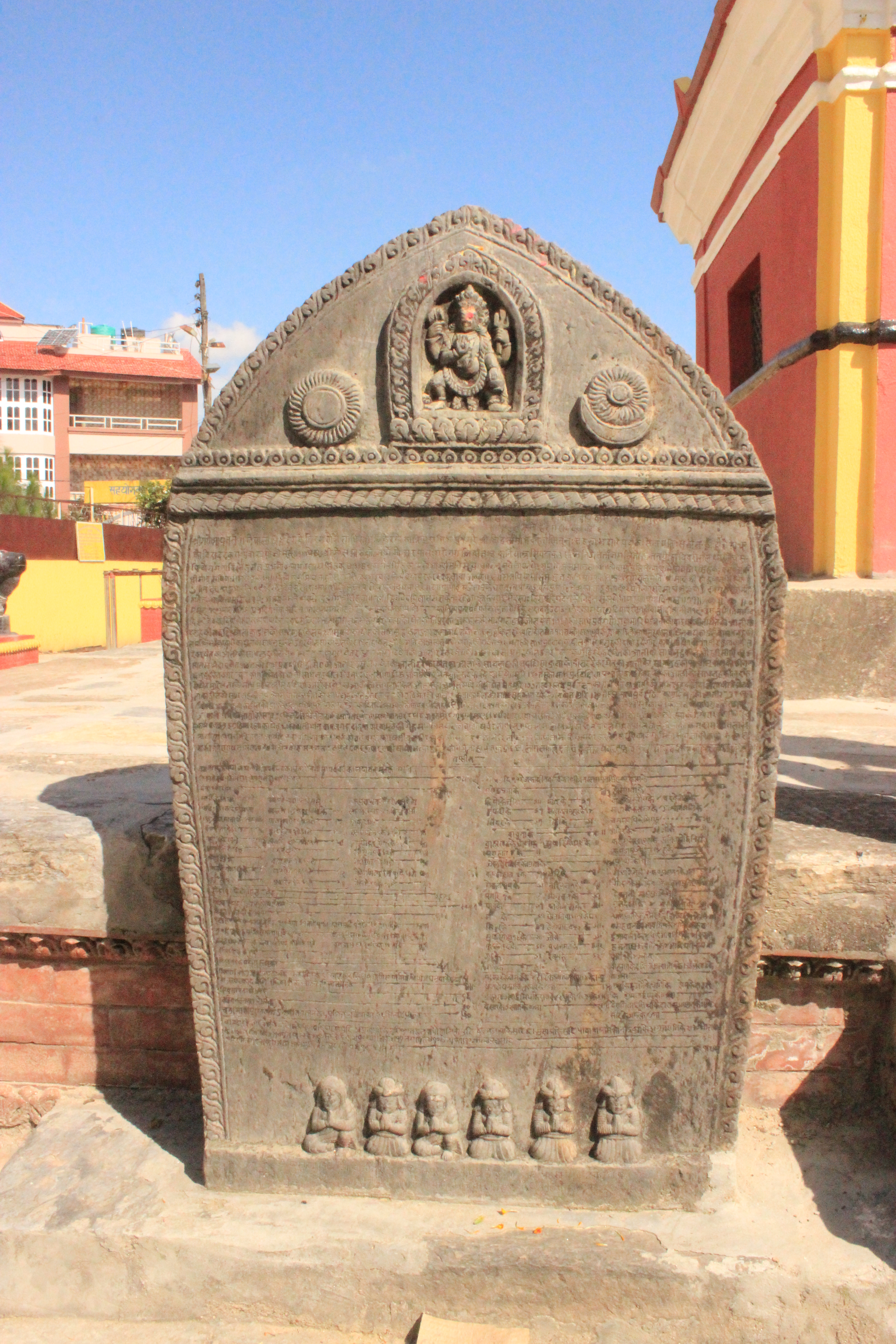
Gaganeshowr Stone inscription

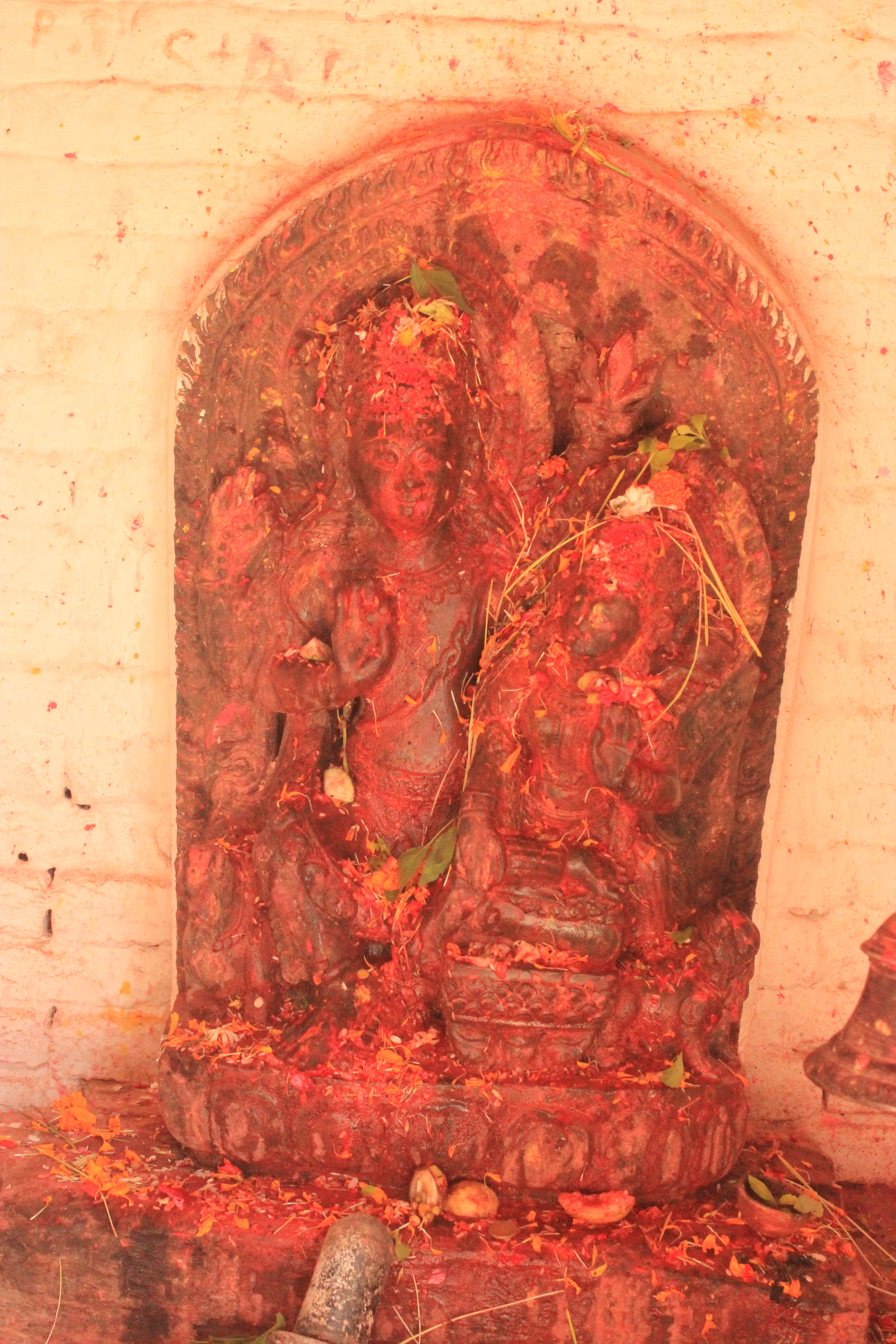
Statue of Shiva Parbati

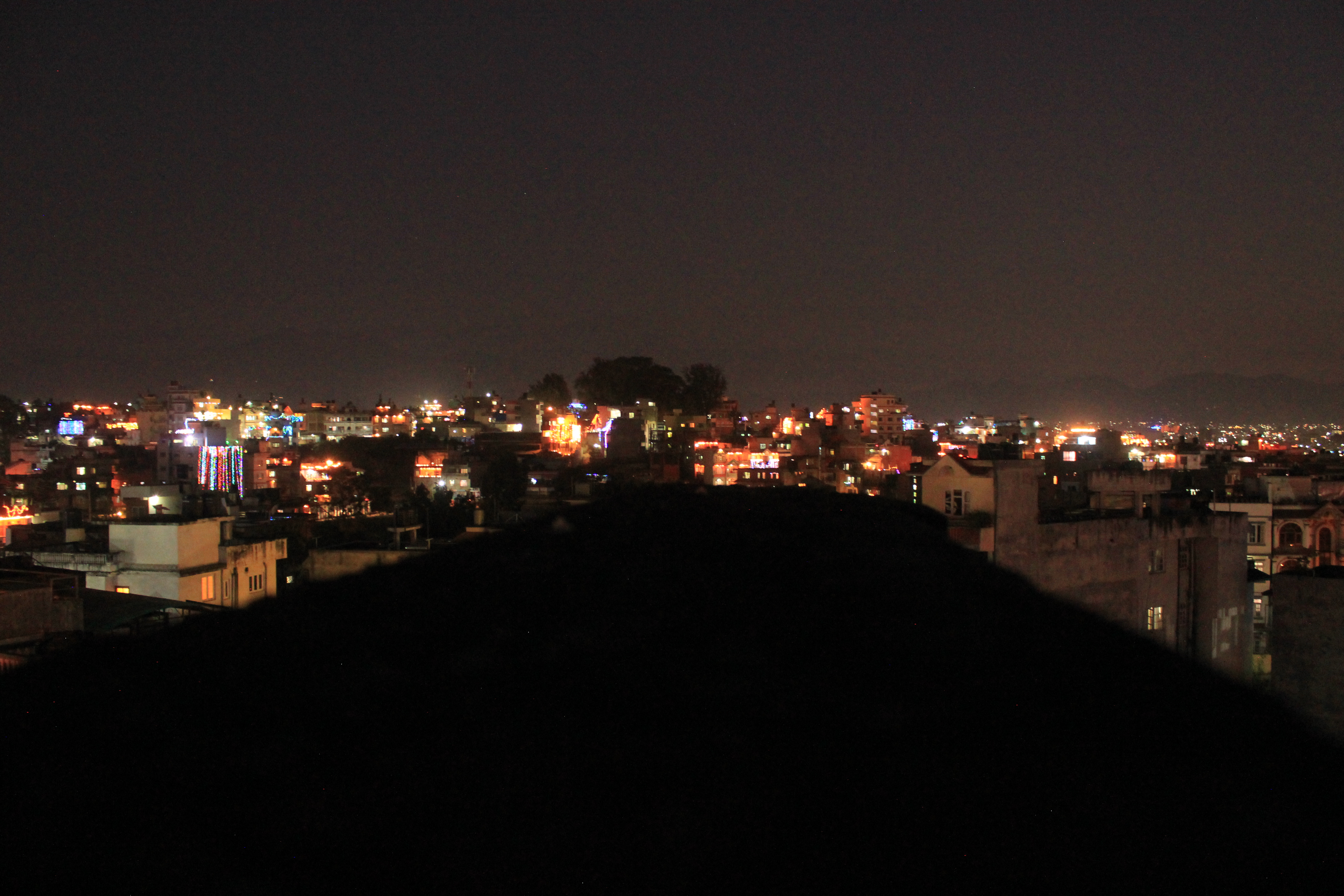
View from Koteshwor Mahadesthan on Tihar festival

== See also ==
- Bagmati River
- Shankhamul
- Koteshwor, Kathmandu
