= Dhansar River =

- Location within Nepal

Location
- Country: Nepal

Physical characteristics
- Source: Chure
  - location: Faparbari, Makawanpur, Nepal
- Mouth: Lalbakaiya river
  - location: Kanakpur, Rautahat, Nepal
  - coordinates: 27.095359°N 85.2225781°E

Dhansar River lies in mid-southern Nepal. It originates from the Chure range and flows towards south from Makawanpur to Rautahat district of Nepal.

The flood in the river displaces the local community every year. To counter this, government has planned to construct embankment along the river.

== See also ==
- List of rivers of Nepal
