= Dhobi Khola =

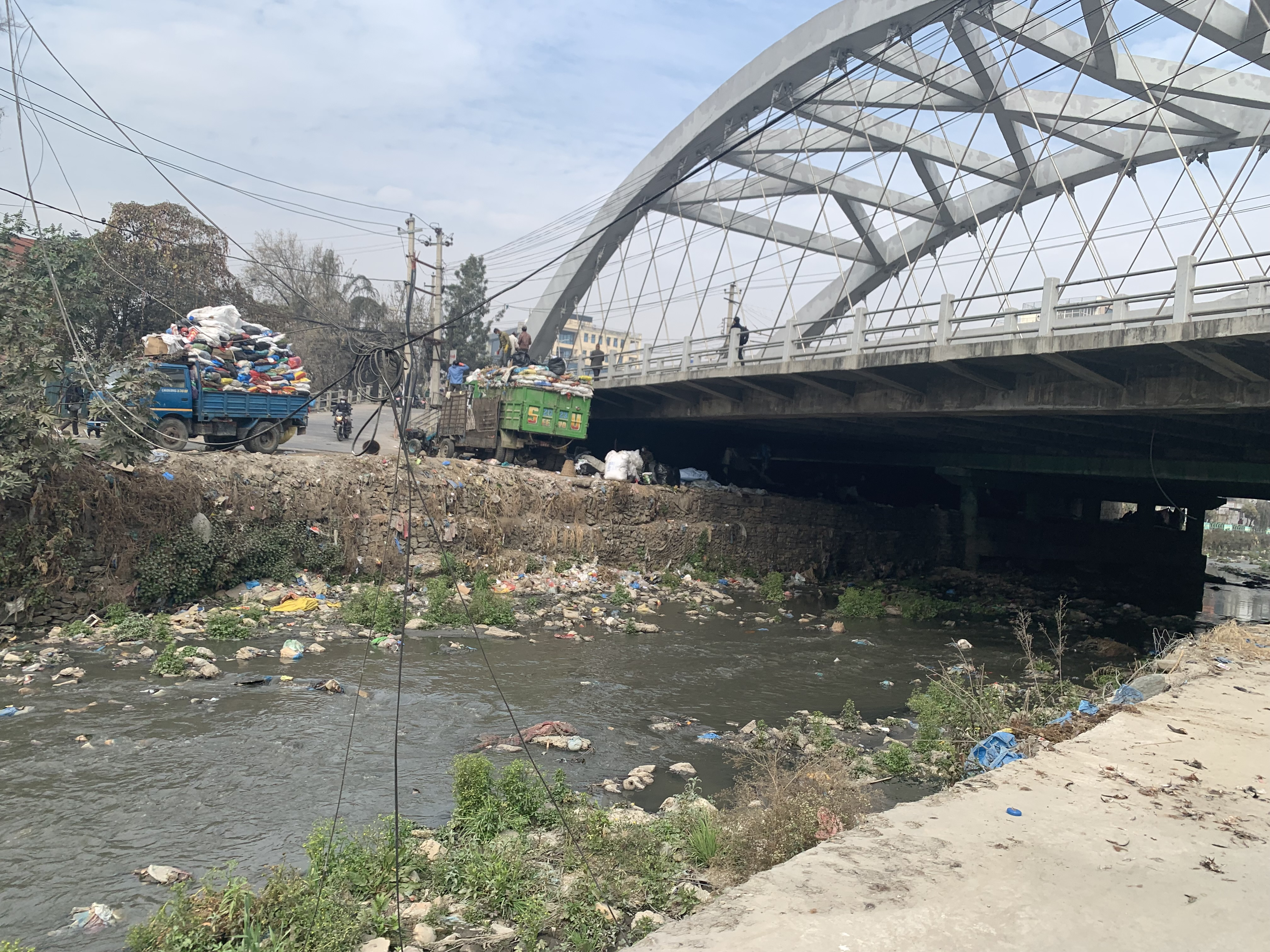
- Dhobi Khola River flowing under the Bijuli Bazar Arch Bridge, 2023 - note the rubbish-dumping lorries

- Mouth of Dhobi Khola River
- Native name: धोबीखोला (Nepali)

Location
- Country: Nepal
- Province: Bagmati Province
- District: Kathmandu District

Physical characteristics
- Source: Muhanpokhari
  - location: Nagarkot
  - coordinates: 27.70480242820259°N 85.48250150808195°E
- 2nd source: Dhobidhunga
  - location: Shivapuri Nagarjun National Park
- Mouth: Bagmati River
  - location: Bijuli Bazar, Kathmandu
  - coordinates: 27.67894373060504°N 85.3339635541958°E
- Length: 18.2 kilometres (11.3 mi)
- Width
  - minimum: 10 metres (33 ft)
  - average: 15 metres (49 ft)
  - maximum: 20 metres (66 ft)

The Dhobi Khola (Nepali: धोबीखोला; from Newar: 𑐴𑐶𑐖𑐵 𑐏𑐸𑐳𑐶, "hijā khusi", meaning "washing-working river"), sometimes known as Rudramati is a tributary of the Bagmati River which is almost entirely in Kathmandu District of Nepal. The river originates in Shivapuri Hill and Muhanpokhari, north of Kathmandu Valley, and is mostly fed by springs and rainfall. The Dhobi Khola's mouth is located at Bijuli Bazar (sometimes called Buddhanagar) where it merges with the Bagmati River.

Dhobi Khola's banks have been used as a dumping ground by private organizations and municipalities. In 2018, volunteers had removed about 30 metric tonnes of solid waste from the river, as part of the Mega Bagmati Clean-up campaign. The same year, a 5 ft in length and 1 ½ ft in width carving described as a "headless, armless figure has been dubbed simply as a ‘nari murti’ or female figure" was found dating back to the Licchavi-era. About 4 ropani (0.5 acres) of land belonging to the river was "illegally registered in the names of individuals under the pretext of updating the land survey map".
