= Panjang River =

Location
- Country: Nepal

Physical characteristics
- Source
  - location: Himalayas
- Mouth
  - location: Karnali River

The Panjang River, a tributary of the Karnali, flows through north-western Nepal.

== Course ==
The Panjang rises from a glacier in the Himalayas, near Charkabhotgaon. Thereafter, it flows parallel to the Nepal-Tibet border with the Humla mountains in the north and Jumla range in the south. It turns towards west and flows into the Karnali as the latter comes out of the Humla gorge. A large number of snow fed tributaries join the Panjang along its course.

While only alpine scrub is found in the glaciated upper catchment of the river, temperate conifer and broad leafed forests cover the steep slopes of the narrow valley at lower levels. Semi-nomadic communities inhabit the Panjang valley. Charkabhotgaon and Phijorgaon are two villages in the area.

The Panjang passes through Shey Phoksundo National Park, Nepal's largest in area.
