= Balan River =

River in Nepal

The Balan River is a transboundary river starting from Sivalik Hills of Nepal and crossing to India at Laxmipur. It is a plains-fed system. The length of the river is about 200 km (120 mi). It then merges with the Kamala River and finally outflows to the Kosi River.

== See also ==
- List of rivers of Nepal
