= Sani Bheri River =

River in Nepal

Coordinates: 28°42′N 82°17′E

Location
- Country: Nepal

Basin features
- River system: Karnali River

Sani Bheri River, a tributary of the Karnali River, starts from the southern slopes of Dhaulagiri range. Sani Bheri River and Thuli Bheri River join at Rimnaghat to form the main Bheri River.
