= Chhandi River =

River in Nepal

- Location within Nepal

Physical characteristics
- Mouth: Dordi River
  - location: Makwanpur District
  - coordinates: 28.2465°N 84.46328°E

The Chhandi River, or Chhandi Khola (Nepali: छंडी खोला), is a river in Nepal, a tributary of the Dordi River.

== Hydrology ==
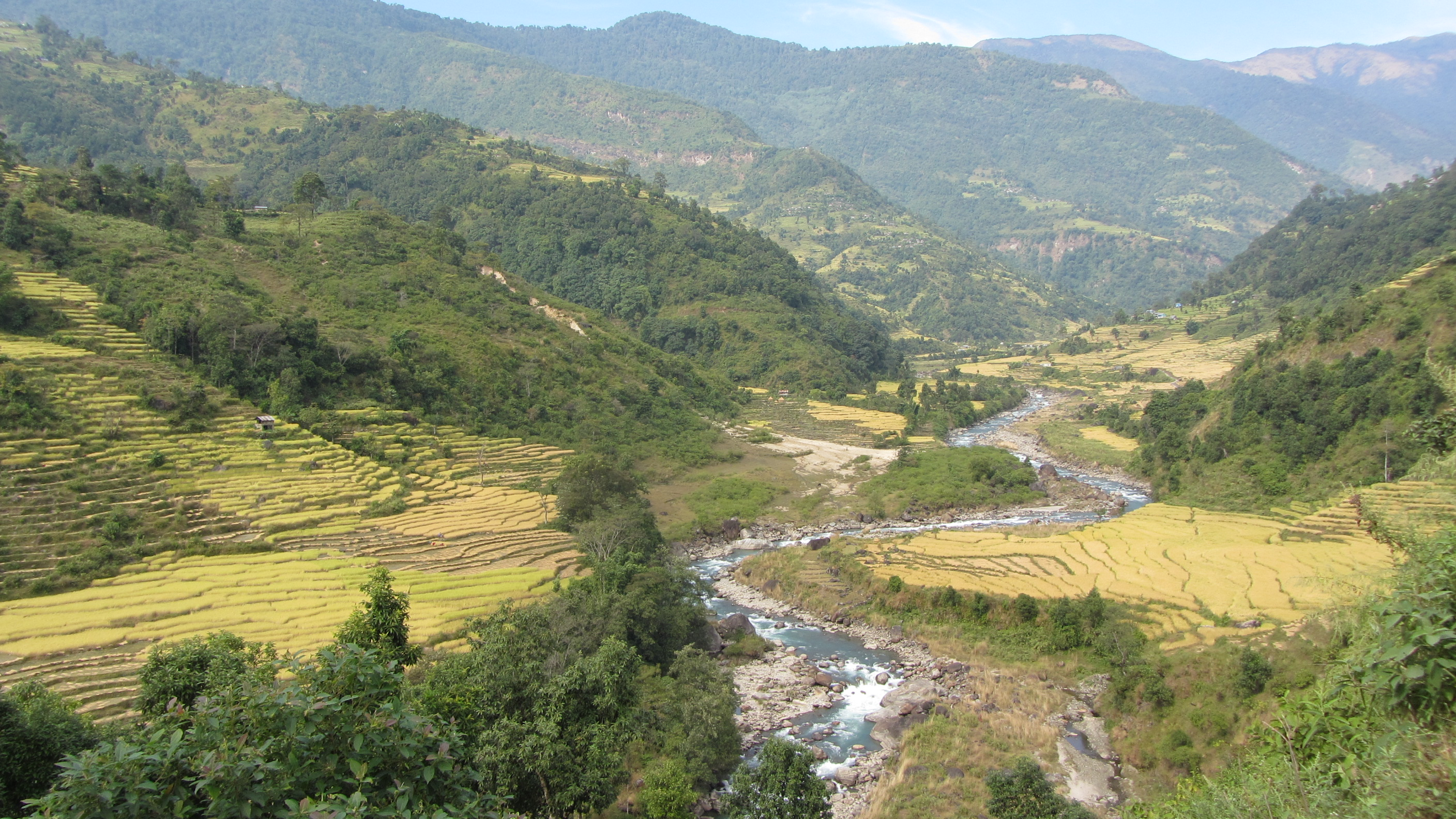
Dordi river

The Chhandi Khola is a tributary of the Dordi River, which in turn is a tributary of the Marsyangdi.

== Hydroelectricity ==
The 2mW Chhandi Khola Small Hydropower Project is a run-of-the-river hydroelectricity plant in Phaleni and Bansar VDCs of Lamjung District. The gross head is about 186 metres (610 ft). It takes 1.03 cubic metres per second (36 cu ft/s) of water from Chhandi Khola, with a catchment area of 21.7 square kilometres (8.4 sq mi) and 0.297 cubic metres per second (10.5 cu ft/s) of water from Ghatte Khola with a catchment area of 10.4 square kilometres (4.0 sq mi). Average annual energy is 11.2 GWh.

The 4mW Upper Chhandi Khola Small Hydropower, under construction in 2020, is another run-of-the-river hydroelectricity plant in Bansar and Phaleni VDCs of Lamjung District. The net head is 712.15 metres (2,336.5 ft). It uses 0.63 cubic metres per second (22 cu ft/s) of water from Chhandi Khola, with a catchment area of 13.51 square kilometres (5.22 sq mi). It is about 100 metres (330 ft) upstream from the headworks of the Chhandi Khola Small Hydropower Project in the Bansar VDC. Projected average annual energy is 22.05 GWh.

Both plants are operated by Chhyandi Hydropower Co.

== Sources ==
- Chhandi Khola Small Hydropower Project 2Mw (Operation), Chhyangdi Hydropower Ltd.
- Upper Chhandi Khola Small Hydropower Project (4 MW), Chhyangdi Hydropower Ltd
