= Bisnumati River =

River in Nepal

Bishnumati River
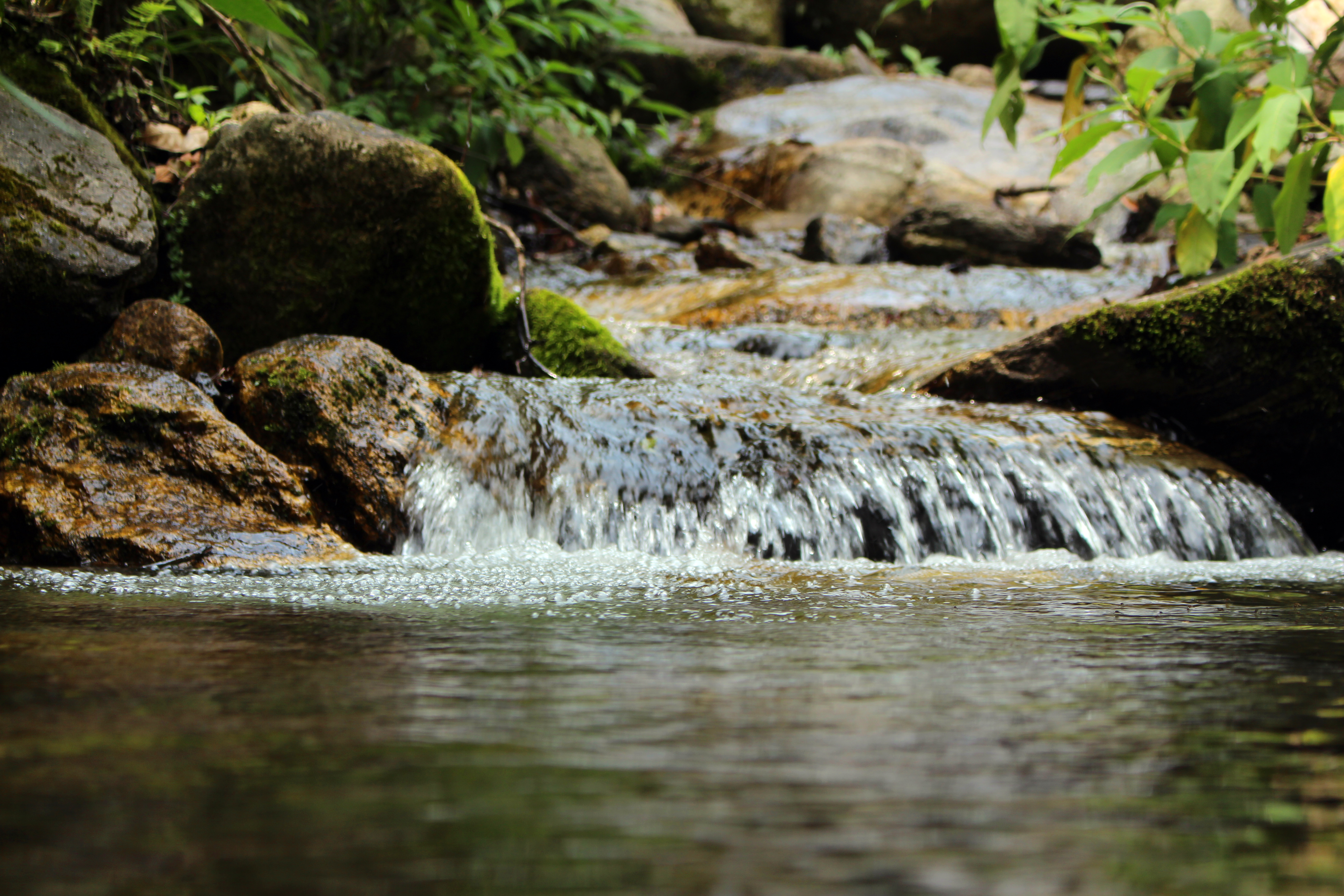
- Bishnumati River

Location
- Country: Nepal

Basin features
- River system: Bagmati River

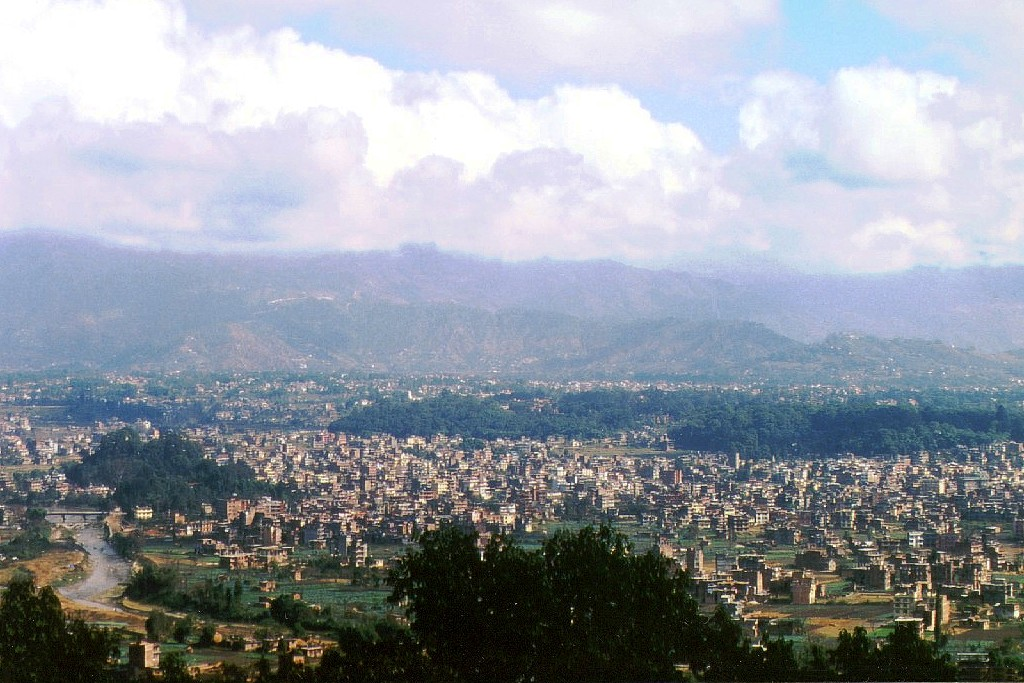
River Vishnumati, a tributary of Bagmati, flowing near city with hills in the background

The Bishnumati River (also known as Bisnumati River) (Nepal Bhasa: 𑐰𑐶𑐲𑑂𑐞𑐸𑐩𑐟𑐶 𑐏𑐸𑐳𑐶, Nepali: विष्णुमति नदी) is a river flowing in the Kathmandu Valley in Nepal that originates at Tokha on Shivapuri Mountain, north of Kathmandu.
