= Thuli Bheri River =

River in Nepal

Coordinates: 28.6920°N 82.2784°E

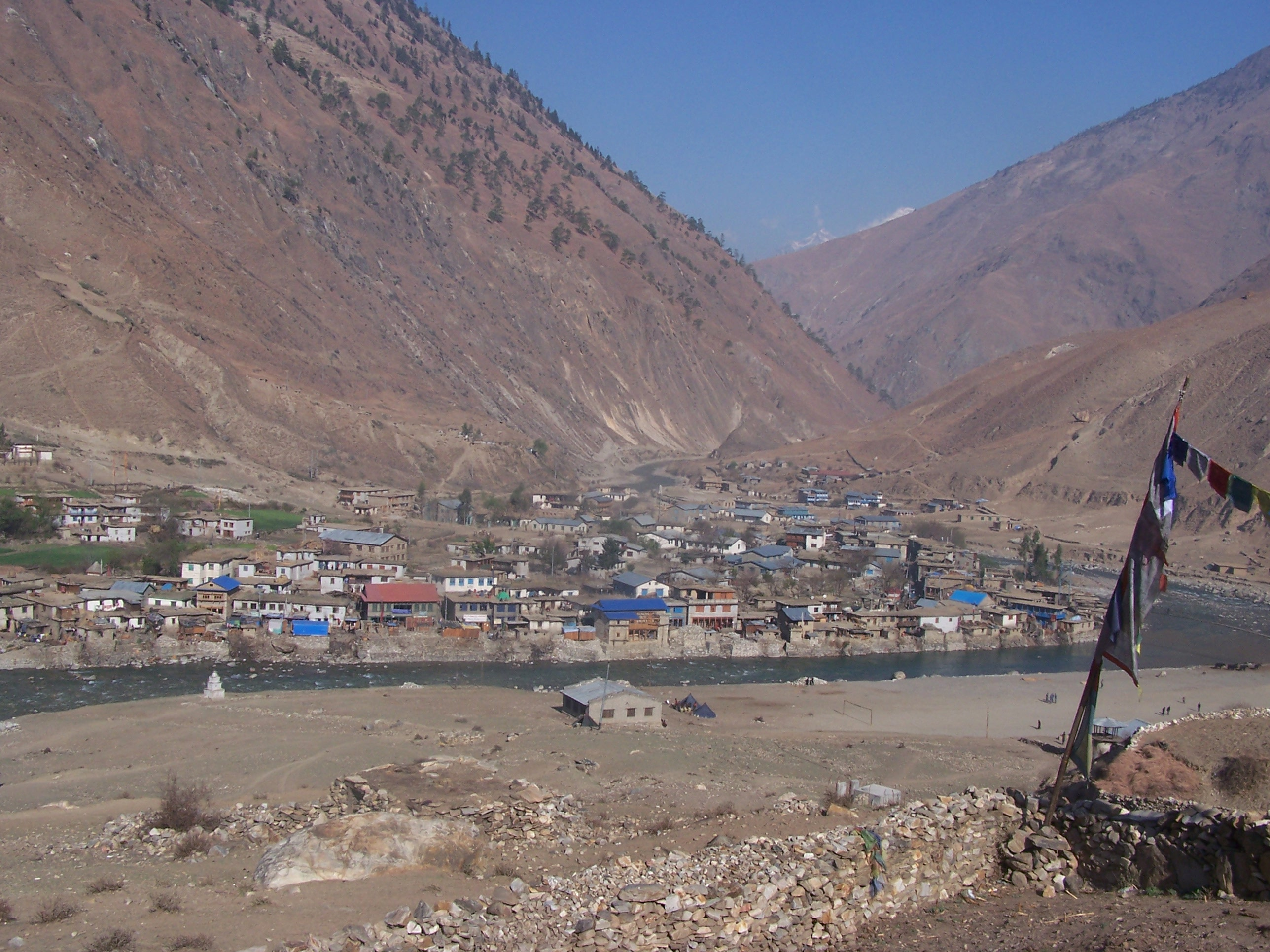

Location
- Country: Nepal

Basin features
- River system: Karnali River

Thuli Bheri River, a tributary of Bheri River which in turn is the tributary of the Karnali River. It starts in the Chharka region of Dolpa District where it is known as the Bhargung Khola (river).

== See also ==
- List of rivers of Nepal
