= Bagmati River =

River in Nepal

Bagmati
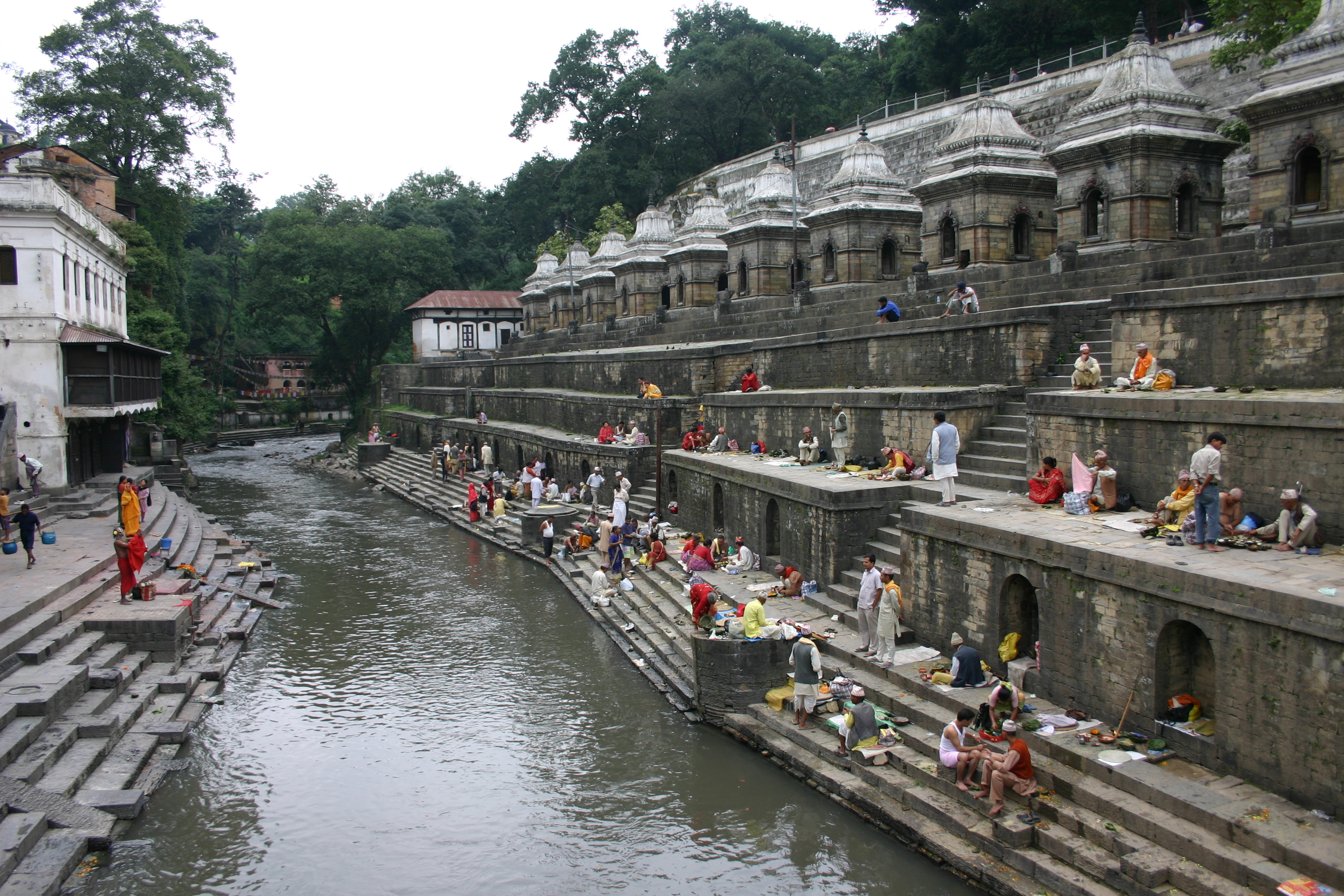
- Bagmati River at Pashupatinath Temple
- Native name: बागमती खुसी (Newar); बागमती नदी (Nepali); वाग्वती नदी (Sanskrit)

Location
- Country: Nepal, India
- State: Bagmati, Madhesh
- Cities: Kathmandu, Patan

Physical characteristics
- Source: Bāghdwār Falls, Bāghdwār (Nepali: बाघद्वार, "Tiger Gate")
  - location: Shivapuri, Sundarijal, Kathmandu, Nepal
  - coordinates: 27°46′16″N 85°25′38″E
  - elevation: 2,740 m (8,990 ft)
- Mouth: Confluence with Kamala River
  - location: Jagmohra, Bihar, India
  - coordinates: 25°43′56.1″N 86°21′53.0″E
- Length: 586.3 kilometres (364.3 mi)
- Discharge
  - location: Pandhera Dovan, Makawanpur
  - maximum: 16,000 m^{3}/s (570,000 cu ft/s)

Basin features
- Tributaries
  - left: Manohara, Marin Khola, Lakhandei, Adhwara, Kamala
  - right: Lalbakaiya, Bishnumati

The Bagmati River (Note: Formerly also written Baghmati.) flows through the Kathmandu Valley of Nepal, separating the cities of Kathmandu and Bhaktapur, before flowing through Madesh Province of southern Nepal and joining the Kamla River in the Indian state of Bihar. It is considered holy by both Hindus and Buddhists. A number of Hindu temples are located on its banks.

The importance of the Bagmati also lies in the fact that Hindus are cremated on the banks of this holy river, and Kirants are buried in the hills by its side. According to the Nepalese Hindu tradition, the dead body must be dipped three times into the Bagmati before cremation, so that the reincarnation cycle may be ended. The chief mourner (usually the first son) who lights the funeral pyre must take a holy river-water bath immediately after cremation. Many relatives who join the funeral procession also take a bath in the river or sprinkle holy water on their bodies at the end of the cremation. It is believed that the Bagmati River purifies people spiritually.

== Etymology ==
The name "Bagmati" is considered to be a Sanskrit translation of the indigenous Newar name nvakhu. In the Newar language, nva translates to "mouth" and khu to "river", thus nvakhu means "mouth river" or "murmuring river." The name nvakhu was translated as vākmati, from which the modern name Bagmati evolved.In the text Pashupati Purana, the river is mentioned as Vaagvati.

Local religious traditions offer several mythological etymologies for the name. For instance, according to the Nepalese Hindu Puranas, the name derives from the Sanskrit words vāk (speech or mouth) and mati (wisdom/mind) as these texts describe the river as originating from the mouth of Shiva. Meanwhile, Nepalese Buddhist texts suggest the river was formed when the vāk (mantra or speech) of the Buddha Kakusandha struck a rock, releasing the water.

The Bagmati River is considered the source of Nepalese civilization and urbanization. The river has been mentioned as Vaggumuda (Sanskrit: वग्गुमुदा) in Vinaya Pitaka and Nandabagga. It has also been mentioned as Bahumati (Sanskrit: बाहुमति) in Battha Suttanta of Majjhima Nikaya. An inscription dated 477 CE describes the river as Bagvati parpradeshe (Sanskrit: वाग्वति पारप्रदेशे) and subsequently also in the 14th century Gopalraj Vamshavali.

== Geography ==
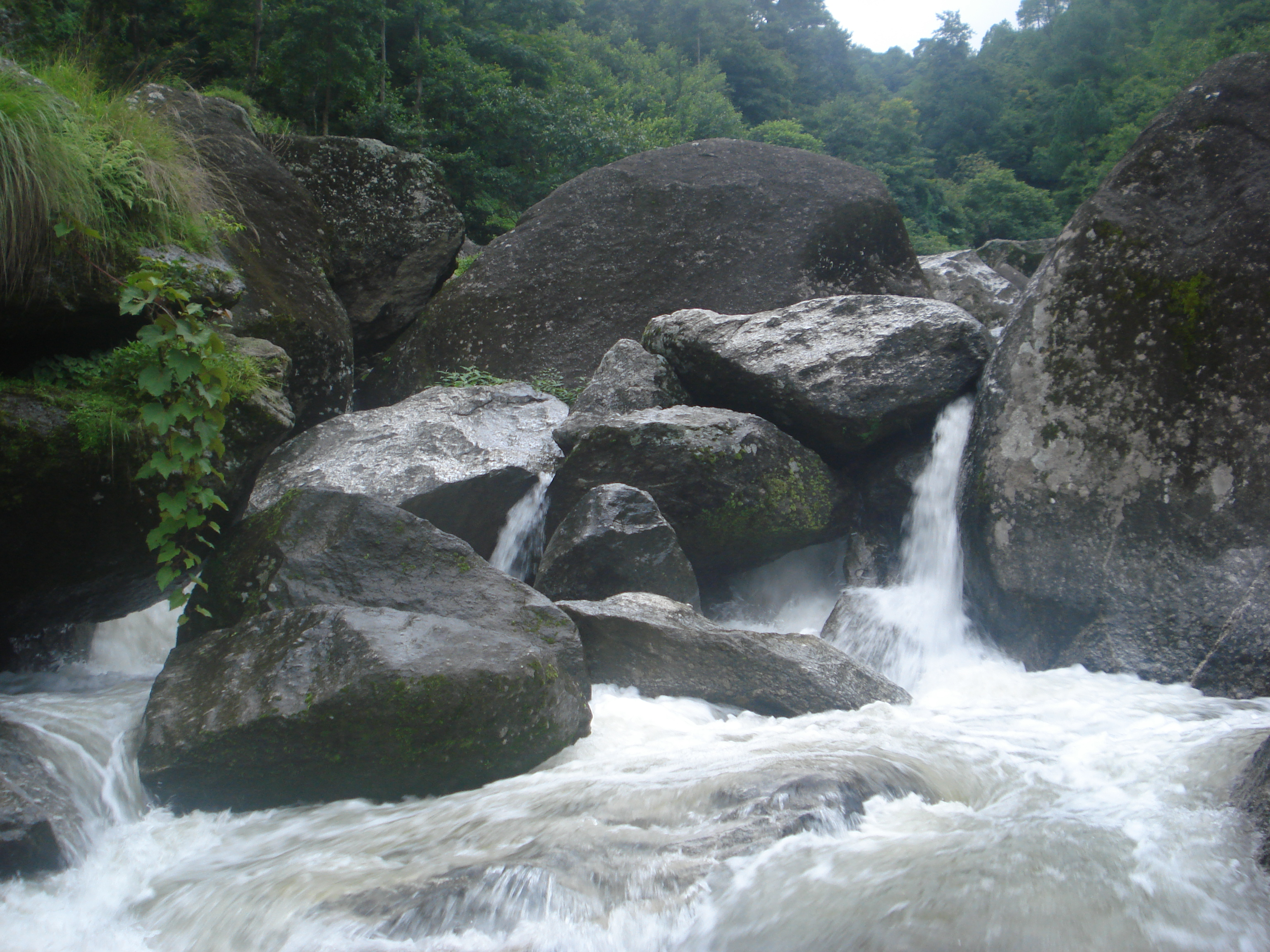
A view of Bagmati River at Sundarijal

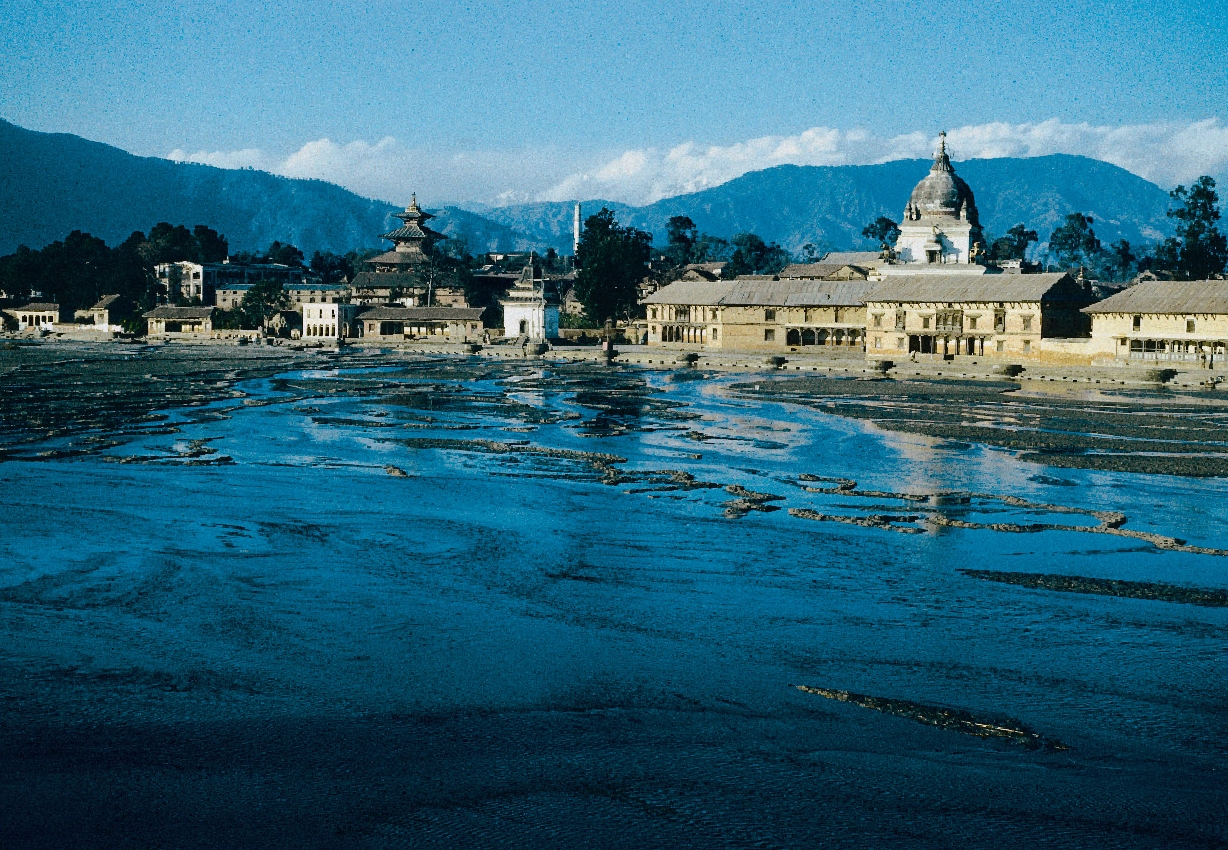
Bagmati River, c. 1950s

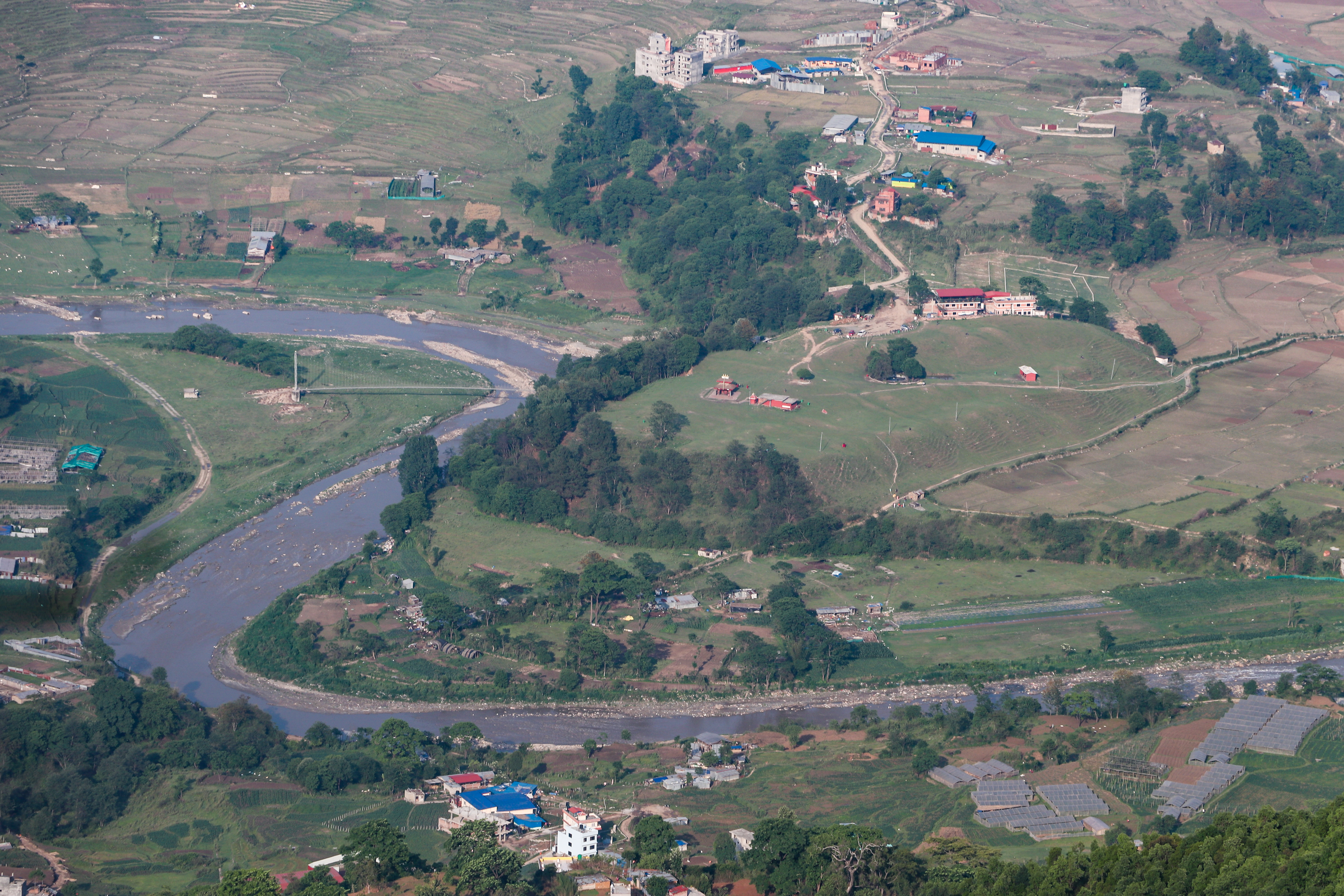
Sikali and Bagmati River bend photographed from Champadevi, Kathmandu

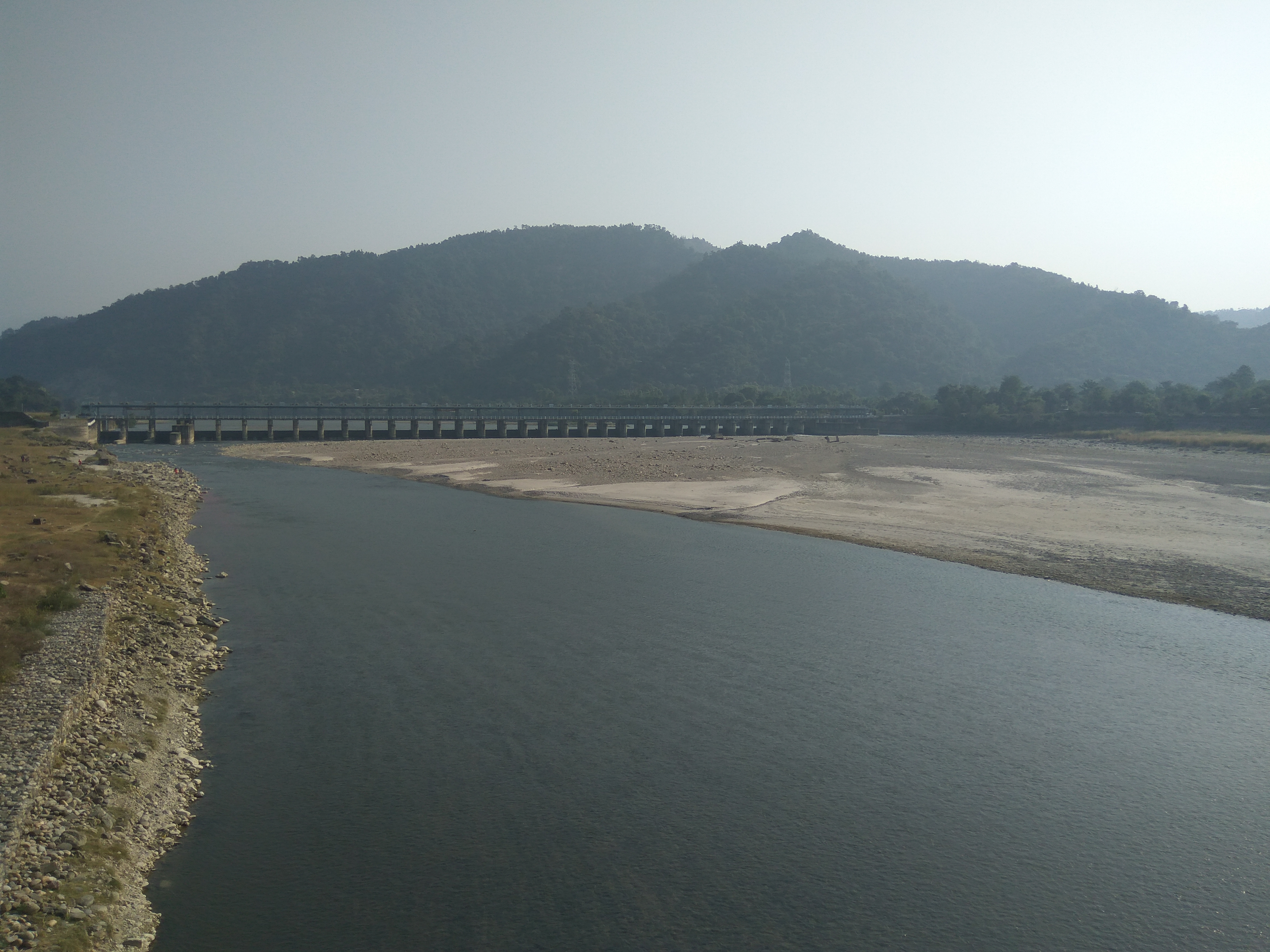
Bagmati River Irrigation Diversion at Sarlahi, Nepal.

The basin of the Bagmati River, including the Kathmandu Valley, lies between the much larger Gandaki basin to the west and the Koshi basin to the east. These adjacent basins extend north of the main Himalayan range and cross it in tremendous gorges, in fact, the Arun tributary of the Koshi extends far into Tibet. The smaller Bagmati rises some distance south of the Himalayas. Without glacial sources, its flow is more dependent on rainfall, becoming very low during the hot season (April to early June), then peaking during the monsoon season (mid-June to mid-August). In these respects, the Bagmati system resembles the (West) Rapti system lying between the Gandaki basin and the Karnali basin in the far west of Nepal.

The Bagmati originates where three headwater streams converge at Bāghdwār Falls (Nepali: बाघद्वार, lit. 'Tiger Gate'), where the water flows out through a gargoyle shaped like a tiger's mouth, situated in Shivpuri Nagarjun National Park near Sundarijal in Nepal . This lies above the southern edge of the Shivapuri Hills, about 15 kilometers (9 mi) northeast of Kathmandu. Here the Bagmati is wide and swift with a high load of suspended solids, giving it a grey appearance. The river flows southwest about 10 km (6 mi) through terraced rice fields in the Kathmandu Valley.

Resistant rock strata interrupt the flow in places, including at Pashupatinath Temple. Beyond the temple, the river flows south until joined by the larger west-flowing Monahara River, then turns west itself. After entering Kathmandu's urban area, more tributaries enter: relatively unpolluted Dhobī Kholā and sewage-laden Tukucha Khola. (Note: Kholā means "small river" or "creek" in Nepali.) Then the river bends south and the Bishnumati enters from the right at Teku Dovan. The Bishnumati also rises in the Shivapuri Hills, some 6 kilometers (4 mi) west of the Bagmati's source. It flows south past the Nagarjun Hill, Swayambhu Stupa and Durbar Square in Kathmandu. As it passes the centre of Kathmandu, this tributary becomes heavily polluted and choked with trash.

Flowing generally south although with many curves, the Bagmati reaches the edge of the Kathmandu valley and enters Chobhar gorge near the Dakshinkali temple complex. The Chobhar gorge cuts through the Mahabharat range, also called the Lesser Himalaya. This 2,000-to-3,000-meter (6,600 to 9,800 ft) range is the southern limit of the "middle hills" across Nepal, an important cultural boundary between distinctive Nepali and more Indian cultures and languages, as well as a major geological feature. The Bagmati also crosses the lower Sivalik Hills before reaching the Terai, then crosses into India at Bairgania. It flows across the districts Darbhanga, Sitamarhi, Sheohar, Muzaffarpur and Khagaria in Bihar. It meets River Kamala at Jagmohra Village of Samastipur. However, in past the river had a different course and used to drain directly into the Ganges. In Swasthani Bratakatha of the Skanda Purana, Bagmati's present northern tributary was regarded as main channel called Sāli river which was a tributary of Gandaki and it is obvious since Manohara river, the present day Sali river, is larger than Bagmati at their confluence.

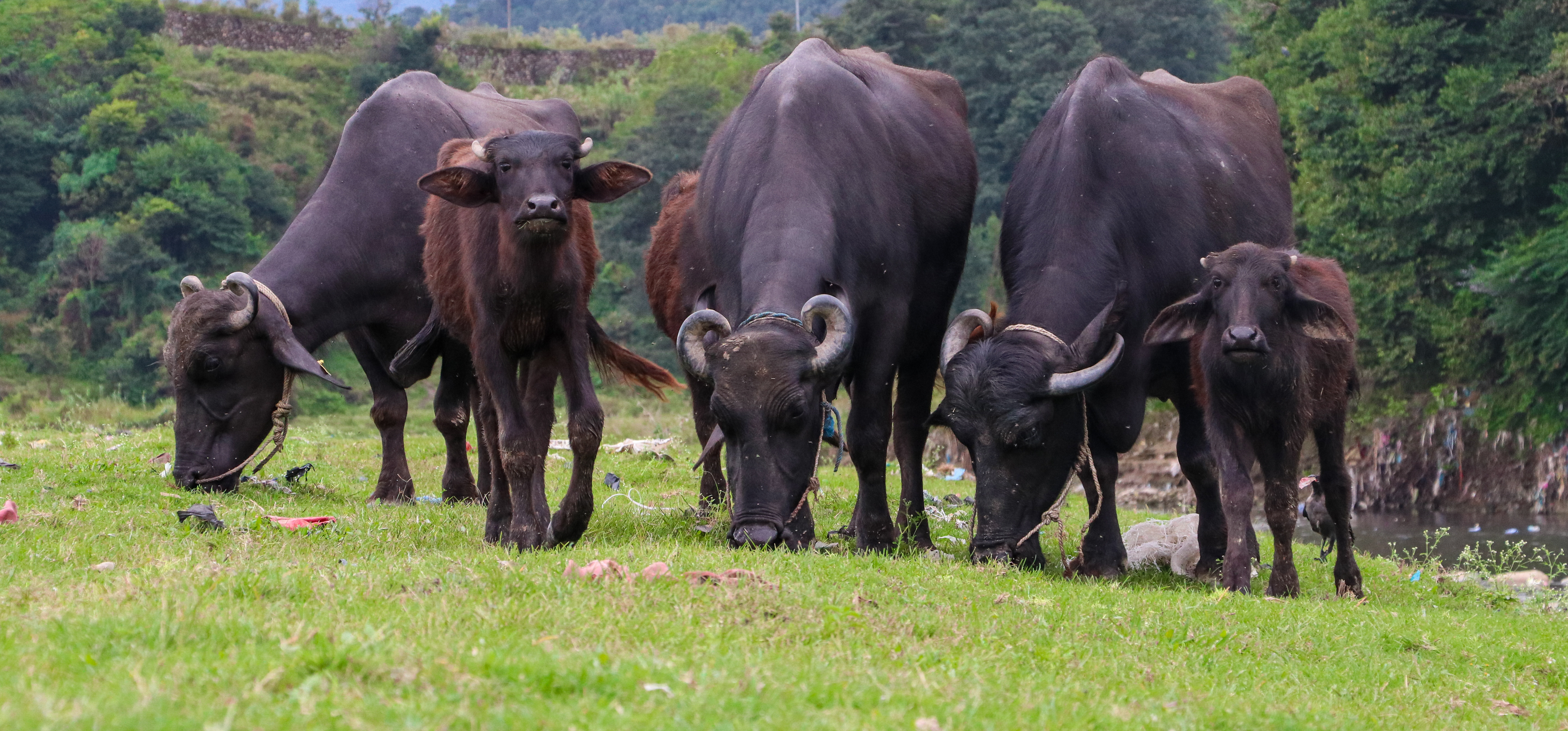
Domestic buffaloes grazing along the bank of Bagmati River, Khokana

== Pollution ==
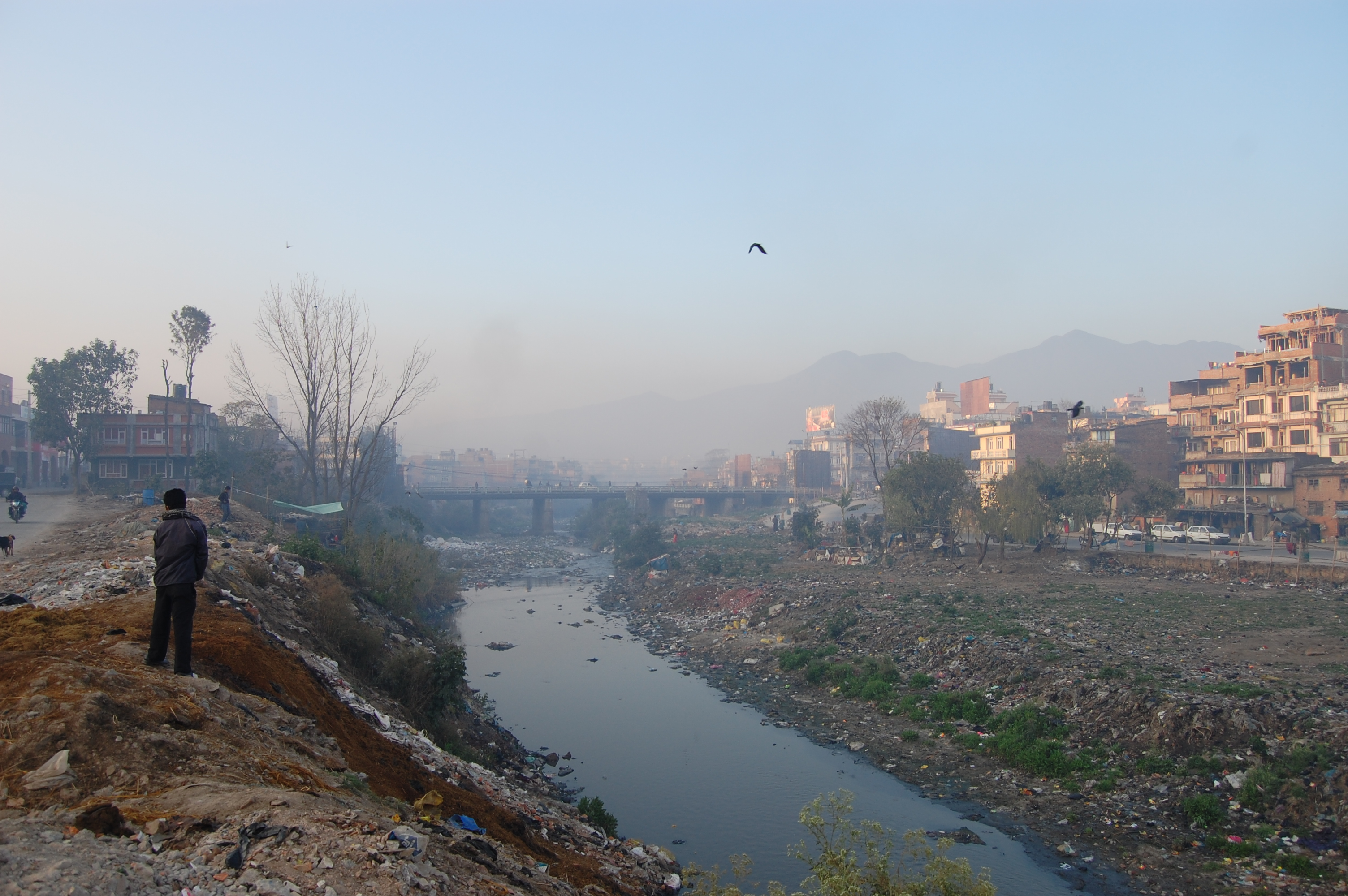
Pollution in Bagmati River in Kathmandu valley

The Bagmati River contains large amounts of untreated sewage, and large levels of pollution of the river exist due primarily to the region's large population. Many residents in Kathmandu empty their personal garbage and waste into the river. In particular the Hanumante Khola, Dhobī Kholā, Tukucha Khola and Bishnumati are the most polluted. Attempts are being made to monitor the Bagmati River system and restore its cleanliness. These include "pollution loads modification, flow augmentation and placement of weirs at critical locations".

On 18 May 2013, under the initiative of then chief secretary Leela Mani Poudyal, the Bagmati Mega Clean-Up Campaign was started. Every Saturday, personnels of the Nepal Army and Nepal Police, along with the general public, gather to clean the waste and sewage from the river.

== Flood ==
There is no effect of flood in most of the areas that it touches, but it has caused widespread sufferings to the people in the Terai region and northern districts of Bihar. The worst destruction by the river were seen in 1993. Poor water management, lack of proper weather forecasting and awareness were the main cause of mass destruction.

== Shrines ==
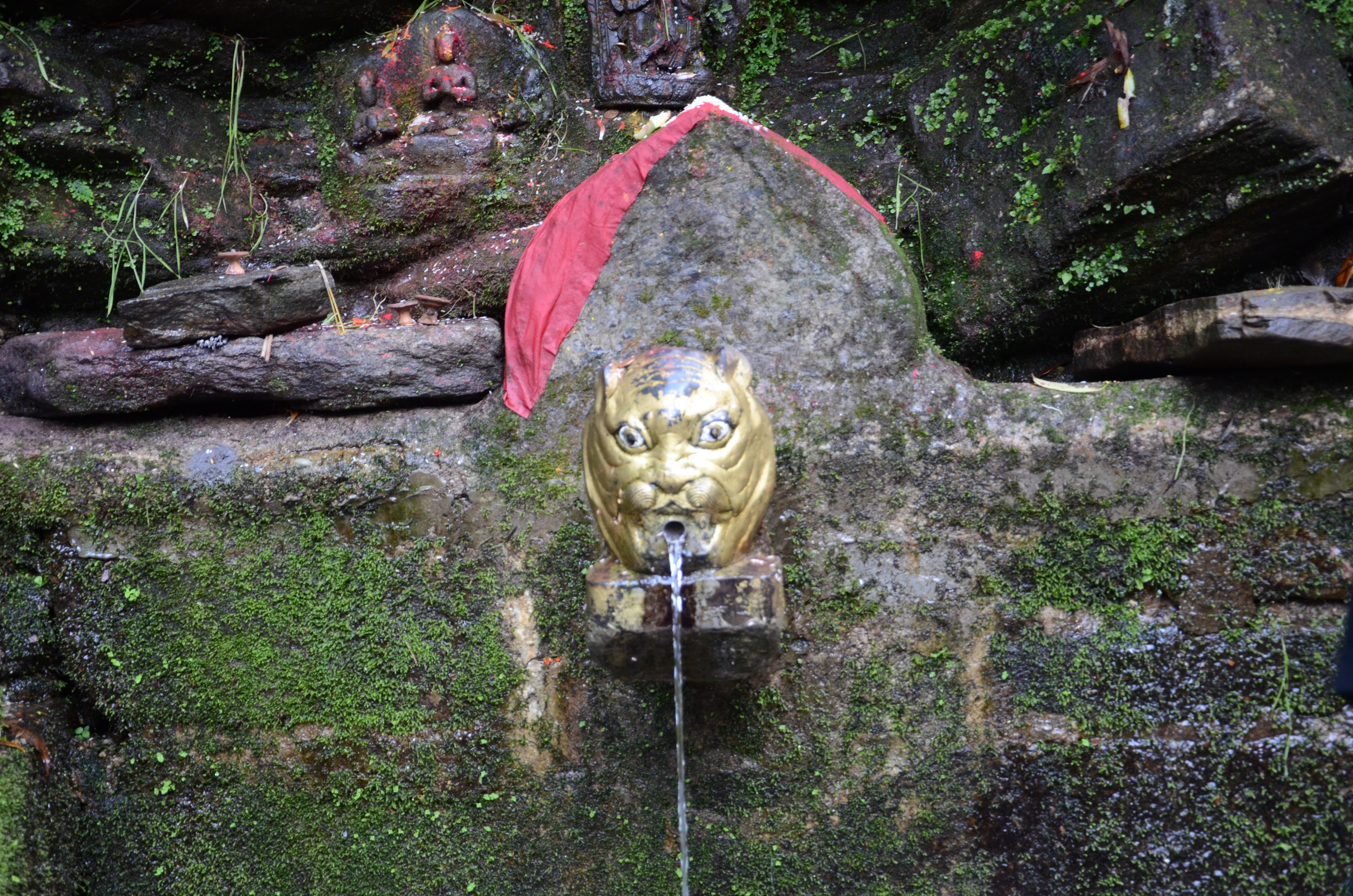
Bāghdwār

- Gokarneshwor – Gokarneshwor Mahadev temple stands the banks of the Bagmati, built in 1582. In late August or early September, people go to this temple to bathe and make offerings in honor of their fathers, living or dead, on a day called Gokarna Aunsi also known as "Kuse Aunsi" (worshipping for the eternal peace of Father).
- Guhyeshwari Temple – Guhyeshwari Temple, the temple of Guhyeshwari Devi, lies about 1 km east of Pashupatinath Temple on the banks of the Bagmati. The temple's name originates from the Sanskrit words Guhya (secret) and Ishwari (goddess). In Lalitha Sahasranama, the 707th name of Goddess is mentioned as Guhyarupini (the form of goddess is beyond human perception and is secret. Another argument is that it is the secret 16th syllable of the Shodashi Mantra) (LS 137th verse: Sarasvati shastramayi| Guhaamba guhyaruupini||). It is believed that parts of Sati Devi's corpse fell in different region when Shiva took it and roamed around the world in sorrow.
- Pashupatinath Temple – The Pashupatinath Temple, dedicated to Shiva, stands on an outcrop above the river north of Kathmandu. It is considered to be one of the holy places of Hinduism.
- Koteshwor Mahadev – Koteshwor Mahadev temple at Koteshwor is also a major holy place located in bank of Bagmati. According to a popular legend, the Shiva Lingam here is believed to be one of the 64 sacred Shiva Lingams.
- Shankhamul – Near the Koteshwor Mahadev temple is a place known as Shankhamul. Shankhamul is one of the twelve “most-sacred” confluences in the Kathmandu Valley as defined in the numerous chronicles that document the history and legends about the Kathmandu valley. At Shankhamul, the Bagmati River that flows south from the Pashupati temple complex, and all the rivers that flow from the eastern part of the valley including the Manohara River merge.
- Kalmochan Temple – Kalmochan temple, dedicated to the Hindu god Lord Vishnu the preserver, was a part of the Thapathali Durbar complex in bank of Bagmati river. It was built in the early 18th century. The temple was built by Jung Bahadur Rana in Moghul Kathmandu-Gothic architecture style and has Mughal art and Nepali art. Also known as Janga Hiranya Hemnarayan Mandir, it is located at Kalmochan Ghāt in Thapathali.
- Tripureshwor Temple – The temple of Tripureshwor Mahadev near Kalmochan Ghāt, is the largest temple in Kathmandu valley, built by Lalit Tripura Sundari Devi in the nineteenth century (around 1875 B.S). It has three roofs—the upper two crafted of metal, while the bottom one is of baked terracota—and sits on a raised platform. The temple was made in the memory of her husband, King Rana Bahadur Shah for his eternal bliss and for the goodwill of her nation. It was probably the last major temple in the tiered style.
- Pachali Bhairav – Established by Lichhavi king Gunakamadev (AD 924–1008), the god is very much associated with the founding of Kathmandu, because it was King Gunakamadev who is traditionally believed to have founded both the city and the festival of Bhairav which is located in the bank of Bagmati river.
- Teku Dovan – One of the 12 sacred Tirthas in the Kathmandu Valley, the ghāts along Gyan Tirtha, at the confluence of Bagmati and Bishnumati, are places for ritual bathing and cremation at or near rivers.
- Jal Binayak Temple – Jal Binayak Temple is a temple of Ganesh, located in the Chobhar. The Jal Binayak Temple is one of the most important Ganesh shrine in Kathmandu region, and is one of the four Binayak temples of the Kathmandu valley.

== Bibliography ==
- "Baghmati" , Encyclopædia Britannica, vol. III (9th ed.), New York: Charles Scribner's Sons, 1878, p. 235.
- Davis, John A. (1977), "Water Quality Standards for the Bagmati River", Journal of the Water Pollution Control Federation, vol. 49, pp. 227–234.
- Kannel, Prakash Raj; et al. (10 April 2007), "Application of automated QUAL2Kw for water quality modeling and management in the Bagmati River, Nepal", Ecological Modelling, vol. 202, pp. 503–517, doi:10.1016/j.ecolmodel.2006.12.033.

== 1981 Bihar Train Disaster ==
In the Indian state of Bihar, on June 6, 1981, a passenger train carrying more than 800 passengers between Mansi (Dhamara Pul) and Saharsa, derailed while crossing a bridge and plunged into the river Bagmati. After five days, more than 200 bodies were recovered, with hundreds more missing that were feared washed away by the river. Estimates of total deaths range from 500 to 800 or more. By the afternoon of June 12, the government had completed its recovery efforts and had issued an official death toll of 235 passengers, with 88 survivors. The death toll included three people whose bodies were not recovered. The crash is the deadliest-ever rail accident in India.
