= Budhahang =

King of ancient Nepal

Budhahang (Nepali: बुढाहाङ) was a king of the Kirati Community in the Kalsha territory, present-day Dhankuta District. He belonged to the Chulung subtribe of the Kirati people and also worship by some Bantawa and Puma Rai as their ancestral deity. His palace was located in the region currently known as Ankhisalla and Chintang. Budhahang is regarded as a former king of the Khalsa area, who ruled during the time when Prithvi Narayan Shah conquered the Kirat region (1774-75 BS). It is said that Ankhisalla, Khoku, Chhintang, Pakhribas, Jhalhara Belhara, Muga, Thangkhuwa, Mahabharat, Hatikharka, Chanuwa, Ahale, Phangduwa, Bhirgaun Sanne, Phalate, and Leguwa were included in the Khalsa territory before the Gorkhali invasion.

== Biography ==
The identity of the king is contradictory, and the details regarding Budhahang's parents are also unclear. According to Kājimān Kandaṅvā (1993: 121), Budhahang's father's name was Rakhansingh hang. Budhahang was the second sibling among four brothers: Cinbassa, Rakhanbassa, Rumbassa, and Rukumbassa (in order of seniority).

Budhahang had several children, although the exact number is unclear. It is agreed that he had seven daughters, namely:

- Sureksi (Hombuyungma)
- Rakaksi
- Tigumhaŋma or Chintang Devi
- Jagadeo
- Sɨŋciri
- Luŋciri
- Piccadaŋma

Budhahang had only one biological son named Rucchihaŋ. It is said that Budhahang scolded his son for killing some fish in the pond. Upset by the scolding, the boy jumped into the pond and drowned.

Budhahang disappeared when Prithvi Narayan Shah attacked him during the unification of Nepal. During the war with the Shah king, he was said to have the ability to revive all the Kiranti warriors who had been killed, using his divine powers.

== Popular beliefs ==
According to legend, Budhahang possessed superhuman abilities. He was able to stop the movements of the sun for up to two hours.

Another story recounts how the children who went to the forest with Budhahang had to check his head for lice. However, instead of lice, they found eyes covering his head. Moreover, as long as the children spent time with Budhahang, it never became dark; it would only get dark after he returned home.

== See also ==
- Nepalese folklore
- Kirati people
