= Sangurigadhi Rural Municipality =

Sangurigadhi साँगुरीगढी गाउँपालिका
- Rural Municipality
- Location in Koshi Province Sangurigadhi (Nepal)
- Coordinates: 26.858889°N 87.320278°E
- Province: Koshi Province
- District: Dhankuta
- Wards: 10
- Seat: Bhedetar

Government
  - Type: Village Council
  - Chairperson: Mr. Jitendra Rai (NC)
  - Vice-chairperson: Mrs. Muna Rai (CPN-UML)

Area
  - Total: 166.44 km^{2} (64.26 sq mi)

Population (2011)
  - Total: 21,536
  - Density: 129.39/km^{2} (335.12/sq mi)
- Time zone: UTC+5:45 (Nepal Standard Time)
- Website: official website

Sangurigadhi (Nepali: साँगुरीगढी) is one of four rural municipalities (gaunpalika) located in Dhankuta District of Koshi Province of Nepal. The remaining three of Dhankuta's seven municipalities are urban.

According to Ministry of Federal Affairs and Local Development, Sangurigadhi has an area of 166.44 square kilometres (64.26 mi^{2}) and the total population of the municipality is 21536 as of Census of Nepal 2011. To form this new Rural Municipality Budi Morang, Khuwaphok, Phaksib, Danda Bazar, Bhedetar, Mahabharat and Ahale were merged, which previously were all separate village development committee (local level administrative villages). Fulfilling the requirement of the new Constitution of Nepal 2015, Ministry of Federal Affairs and Local Development replaced all old VDCs and Municipalities into 753 new local level body (Municipality).

The Gaunpalika is divided into 10 wards and Bhedetar is the headquarters of this newly formed rural municipality.

== Demographics ==
At the time of the 2011 Nepal census, Sangurigadhi Rural Municipality had a population of 21,537. Of these, 31.0% spoke Bantawa, 28.0% Limbu, 12.2% Nepali, 7.8% Magar, 6.7% Yakkha, 5.4% Rai, 2.9% Tamang, 1.6% Yamphu, 1.0% Chintang, 0.8% Lohorung, 0.5% Maithili, 0.5% Newar, 0.2% Chamling, 0.1% Bote, 0.1% Gurung, 0.1% Tharu, 0.1% Wambule and 0.7% other languages as their first language.

In terms of ethnicity/caste, 39.5% were Rai, 29.2% Limbu, 8.0% Magar, 6.7% Yakkha, 3.4% Chhetri, 3.1% Tamang, 2.2% Kami, 1.6% Yamphu, 1.4% Hill Brahmin, 1.2% Sarki, 0.8% Damai/Dholi, 0.6% Newar, 0.5% Majhi, 0.2% Gharti/Bhujel, 0.2% Gurung, 0.2% Tharu, 0.1% Bantawa, 0.1% Bengali, 0.1% Bote, 0.1% Kathabaniyan, 0.1% Teli, 0.1% Yadav and 0.8% others.

In terms of religion, 67.2% were Kirati, 21.2% Hindu, 6.6% Buddhist, 4.7% Christian, 0.1% Muslim and 0.1% Prakriti and 0.2% others.

In terms of literacy, 71.1% could read and write, 2.2% could only read and 26.7% could neither read nor write.
