= Chaubise Rural Municipality =

Chaubise चौबिसे गाउँपालिका
- Rural Municipality
- Location in Koshi Province Chaubise (Nepal)
- Coordinates: 26.87377°N 87.43562°E
- Province: Koshi Province
- District: Dhankuta
- Wards: 8
- Established: 10 March 2017
- Seat: Rajarani

Government
  - Type: Village Council
  - Chairperson: Mr. Rajkumar Chemjong (NCP)
  - Vice-chairperson: Mrs. Tanka Maya Pangmi (NCP)

Area
  - Total: 147.6 km^{2} (57.0 sq mi)
- Highest elevation: 2,350 m (7,710 ft)
- Lowest elevation: 250 m (820 ft)

Population (2011)
  - Total: 19,283
  - Density: 130.6/km^{2} (338.4/sq mi)
- Time zone: UTC+5:45 (Nepal Standard Time)
- Website: official website

Chaubise (Nepali: चौबिसे) is one of four rural municipalities (gaunpalika) in Dhankuta District of the Koshi Province of Nepal. Out of Dhankuta's seven municipalities, three are urban and four rural.

According to Ministry of Federal Affairs and Local Development, Chaubise has an area of 147.6 square kilometres (57.0 mi^{2}) and the total population of the municipality is 19283 as of Census of Nepal 2011. To form this new Rural Municipality 6 No. Budhabare, Mudebas, Kuruletenupa, Bodhe, Rajarani, Maunabuthuk and Basantatar were merged, which were previously all separate village development committees (local level administrative villages). Fulfilling the requirement of the new Constitution of Nepal 2015, Ministry of Federal Affairs and Local Development replaced all old VDCs and Municipalities into 753 new local level body (Municipality).

The Gaunpalika is divided into 8 wards and Rajarani, Dhankuta is the headquarter of this newly formed rural municipality.

== Demographics ==
At the time of the 2011 Nepal census, Chaubise Rural Municipality had a population of 19,283. Of these, 32.6% spoke Limbu, 29.0% Nepali, 15.8% Magar, 7.8% Yakkha, 6.2% Tamang, 3.9% Yamphu, 2.1% Rai, 0.6% Majhi, 0.4% Newar, 0.3% Bantawa, 0.2% Bhujel, 0.2% Gurung, 0.2% Maithili, 0.1% Chamling, 0.1% Sanskrit, 0.1% Tharu and 0.4% other languages as their first language.

In terms of ethnicity/caste, 33.6% were Limbu, 15.9% Magar, 11.5% Chhetri, 8.8% Yakkha, 6.5% Tamang, 4.6% Hill Brahmin, 3.6% Rai, 3.5% Kami, 3.3% Yamphu, 3.2% Newar, 1.7% Damai/Dholi, 1.2% Majhi, 0.7% Sanyasi/Dasnami, 0.5% Gurung, 0.5% Sarki, 0.4% Gharti/Bhujel, 0.1% Badi, 0.1% Tharu and 0.4% others.

In terms of religion, 45.9% were Kirati, 33.2% Hindu, 18.5% Buddhist, 1.6% Christian, 0.1% Prakriti and 0.7% others.

In terms of literacy, 73.8% could read and write, 1.9% could only read and the remaining 24.3% could neither read nor write.
