= Chhathar Jorpati Rural Municipality =

Chhathar Jorpati छथर जोरपाटी गाउँपालिका
- Rural Municipality
- Location in Koshi Province Chhathar Jorpati (Nepal)
- Coordinates: 27.00°N 87.39°E
- Province: Koshi Province
- District: Dhankuta
- Wards: 6
- Established: 10 March 2017
- Seat: Tankhuwa

Government
  - Type: Village Council
  - Chairperson: Mr. Sher Bahadur Limbu (NCP)
  - Vice-chairperson: Mrs. Bhimkala Shrestha (NCP)

Area
  - Total: 102.83 km^{2} (39.70 sq mi)

Population (2011)
  - Total: 18,322
  - Density: 178.18/km^{2} (461.48/sq mi)
- Time zone: UTC+5:45 (Nepal Standard Time)
- Website: official website

Chhathar Jorpati (Nepali: छथर जोरपाटी गाउँपालिका) is one of four rural municipalities (gaunpalika) in Dhankuta District of Koshi Province of Nepal. Out of the total seven municipalities in Dhankuta, three are urban and four rural.

According to Ministry of Federal Affairs and Local Development Chhathar Jorpati has an area of 102.83 square kilometres (39.70 mi^{2}) and the total population of the municipality is 18322 as of Census of Nepal 2011. To form this new Rural Municipality Hathikharka, Tankhuwa, Telia and Parewadin were merged, which previously were all separate Village development committee (local level administrative villages). Fulfilling the requirement of the new Constitution of Nepal 2015, Ministry of Federal Affairs and Local Development replaced all old VDCs and Municipalities into 753 new local level body (Municipality).

The Gaunpalika is divided into 6 wards and Tankhuwa is the headquarter of this newly formed rural municipality.

== Demographics ==
At the 2011 Nepal census, Chhathar Jorpati Rural Municipality had a population of 18,322. Of these, 44.4% spoke Nepali, 31.6% Limbu, 11.3% Magar, 4.3% Tamang, 2.2% Sherpa, 2.2% Newar, 1.2% Gurung, 1.0% Rai, 0.7% Bhujel, 0.3% Maithili, 0.1% Bhojpuri, 0.1% Yakkha and 0.2% other languages as their first language.

In terms of ethnicity/caste, 32.3% were Limbu, 25.1% Chhetri, 11.6% Magar, 5.5% Hill Brahmin, 4.8% Tamang, 3.8% Newar, 2.8% Kami, 2.6% Sherpa, 2.5% Gurung, 2.4% Damai/Dholi, 2.0% Gharti/Bhujel, 1.6% Rai, 0.8% Sarki, 0.7% Sanyasi/Dasnami, 0.3% Badi, 0.2% Bantawa, 0.2% Sunuwar, 0.1% Yadav, 0.1% Yakkha and 0.6% others.

In terms of religion, 47.1% were Hindu, 31.4% Kirati, 18.9% Buddhist, 1.7% Christian, 0.5% Prakriti and 0.2% others.

In terms of literacy, 72.5% could read and write, 1.5% could only read and 26.0% could neither read nor write.
