= Mahalaxmi Municipality, Dhankuta =

Mahalaxmi महालक्ष्मी नगरपालिका
- Municipality
- Mahalaxmi Municipality
- Location in Koshi Province Mahalaxmi (Nepal)
- Coordinates: 27.11°N 87.31°E
- Country: Nepal
- Province: Koshi
- District: Dhankuta
- Total Wards: 9

Government
  - Mayor: Mr. Dhurbaraj Raya (NC)
  - Deputy Mayor: Mrs. Manju Adhikari (NCP)

Area of Municipality
  - Total: 126.3 km^{2} (48.8 sq mi)
- Highest elevation: 2,696 m (8,845 ft)
- Lowest elevation: 250 m (820 ft)

Population (2011)
  - Total: 24,800

Languages
  - Official: Nepali
- Time zone: UTC+5:45 (NST)
- Website: official website

Mahalaxmi (Nepali: महालक्ष्मी) is a municipality in Dhankuta District of Koshi Province in Nepal. It is one of three urban municipalities in Dhankuta District. The total area of the municipality is 126.3 km (78.5 mi) and according to 2011 census of Nepal, the population of this municipality is 24,800. The municipality is divided into nine wards. The headquarter of the municipality is in Jitpur Bazar.

== Demographics ==
At the time of the 2011 Nepal census, Mahalaxmi Municipality had a population of 24,800. Of these, 74.8% spoke Nepali, 10.4% Magar, 6.0% Yakkha, 3.0% Tamang, 2.7% Limbu, 1.7% Newar, 0.6% Rai, 0.2% Maithili, 0.1% Bantawa, 0.1% Bhojpuri, 0.1% Bhujel, 0.1% Hindi and 0.2% other languages as their first language.

In terms of ethnicity/caste, 40.7% were Chhetri, 10.8% Magar, 6.6% Newar, 6.3% Hill Brahmin, 6.3% Yakkha, 6.0% Kami, 4.3% Gurung, 4.2% Tamang, 3.6% Damai/Dholi, 3.0% Limbu, 1.9% Sarki, 1.7% Gharti/Bhujel, 1.6% Rai, 1.1% Sanyasi/Dasnami, 1.0% Majhi, 0.2% Thakuri, 0.1% Badi, 0.1% Sherpa, 0.1% Teli, 0.1% Tharu and 0.3% others.

In terms of religion, 75.7% were Hindu, 14.3% Buddhist, 8.6% Kirati, 1.1% Christian, and 0.2% others.

In terms of literacy, 73.0% could read and write, 1.2% could only read and 25.8% could neither read nor write.
