= Arun Corridor =

- Chatara-Leguwa Road

Route information
- Length: 65 km (40 mi)
- History: Under construction

Major junctions
- North end: Leguwa
- Baraha Kshetra,
- South end: Chatara

Location
- Country: Nepal
- Provinces: Koshi Province
- Districts: Sunsari, Dhankuta, Bhojpur

Highway system
- Roads in Nepal

Arun Corridor or Chatara–Leguwaghat Road is a 65-kilometre-long (40 mi) road which is being constructed in Koshi Province, Nepal. The starting point of the road is fixed at Koshi Bridge at Chatara, which will be connected with Mangmaya Danda (Leguwaghat) on the border of Mahalaxmi Municipality and Pakhribas Municipality in Dhankuta District. The 45 kilometres (28 mi) of the section of the road has already been awarded for the construction at a cost of about one billion Nepali rupees. 35 kilometres (22 mi) of track has already been opened. 20-to-40-metre (66 to 131 ft) motorable concrete bridges will have to be constructed at 11 places along the entire 65-kilometre (40 mi) road of the project. The Arun Corridor will be an alternative and short route of the Koshi Highway for the residents of Bhojpur, Sankhuwasabha and Mahalaxmi and Pakhribas areas of Dhankuta, will be limited to 65 kilometres (40 mi) from about 125 kilometres (78 mi).
