= Shahidbhumi Rural Municipality =

Shahidbhumi सहीदभूमि गाउँपालिका
- Rural Municipality
- Location in Koshi Province Shahidbhumi (Nepal)
- Coordinates: 26.99°N 87.21°E
- Province: Koshi Province
- District: Dhankuta
- Wards: 7
- Established: 10 March 2017
- Seat: Khoku

Government
  - Type: Village Council
  - Chairperson: Mr. Manoj Rai (NCP)
  - Vice-chairperson: Mrs. Ratneshwari Rai (NCP)

Area
  - Total: 99.55 km^{2} (38.44 sq mi)

Population (2011)
  - Total: 18,730
  - Density: 188.1/km^{2} (487.3/sq mi)
- Time zone: UTC+5:45 (Nepal Standard Time)
- Website: official website

Shahidbhumi (Nepali: सहीदभूमि गाउँपालिका) is one of four rural municipalities (gaunpalika) located in Dhankuta District of Koshi Province of Nepal. Out of Dhankuta's total seven municipalities, three are urban and four rural.

According to Ministry of Federal Affairs and Local Development Khalsa Chhintang Sahidbhumi has an area of 99.55 square kilometres (38.44 mi^{2}) and the total population of the municipality is 18730 as of Census of Nepal 2011. To form this new Rural Municipality Chhintang, Khoku and Ankhisalla were merged, which previously were all separate Village development committee (local level administrative villages). Fulfilling the requirement of the new Constitution of Nepal 2015, Ministry of Federal Affairs and Local Development replaced all old VDCs and Municipalities into 753 new local level body (Municipality).

The Gaunpalika is divided into 7 wards and Khoku is the headquarter of this newly formed rural municipality. The rural municipality was established as "Khalsa Chhintang Sahidbhumi" on 10 March 2017 but its name was shortened to just "Shahidbhumi" on 8 January 2018.

== Demographics ==
At the time of the 2011 Nepal census, Shahidbhumi Rural Municipality had a population of 18,763. Of these, 39.7% spoke Bantawa, 25.7% Nepali, 18.4% Chintang, 10.0% Chulung, 1.5% Magar, 1.1% Chamling, 0.8% Wambule, 0.7% Rai, 0.3% Dungmali, 0.3% Tamang, 0.2% Khaling, 0.2% Limbu, 0.2% Newar, 0.2% Thulung, 0.1% Kuki, 0.1% Maithili, 0.1% Tharu and 0.3% other languages as their first language.

In terms of ethnicity/caste, 78.8% were Rai, 7.8% Chhetri, 3.2% Kami, 2.2% Sarki, 1.9% Magar, 1.6% Damai/Dholi, 1.2% Majhi, 1.2% Newar, 0.4% Tamang, 0.3% Hill Brahmin, 0.3% Limbu, 0.3% Sanyasi/Dasnami, 0.2% Bantawa, 0.2% Gharti/Bhujel, 0.1% Pattharkatta/ Kushwadiya, 0.1% Sunuwar, 0.1% Tharu and 0.3% others.

In terms of religion, 74.4% were Kirati, 24.6% Hindu, 0.4% Christian, 0.3% Buddhist, 0.1% Muslim and 0.2% others.

In terms of literacy, 67.4% could read and write, 4.0% could only read and 28.6% could neither read nor write.
