= Yakkha language =

Kiranti language in Nepal and India

Yakkha
- Nepali: याक्खा
- Region: Sikkim, Nepal
- Native speakers: 20,000 (2011 census)
- Language family: Sino-Tibetan: Tibeto-Burman; Mahakiranti (?); Kiranti; Eastern; Greater Yakkha; Yakkha
- Writing system: Devanagari

Language codes
- ISO 639-3: ybh – inclusive code Individual codes: lmh – Lambichhong (duplicate code) phw – Phangduwali (duplicate code) luu – Lumba-Yakkha (duplicate code)
- Glottolog: yakk1236
- ELP: Yakha

Yakkha (also erroneously spelled as Yakha) (Nepali: याक्खा) is a language spoken in parts of Nepal, Darjeeling district and Sikkim. The Yakkha-speaking villages are located to the East of the Arun river, in the southern part of the Sankhuwasabha district and in the northern part of the Dhankuta district of Nepal. About 14,000 people still speak the language, out of 17,003 ethnic Yakkha in Nepal. Genealogically, Yakkha belongs to the Eastern Kiranti languages and is in one subgroup with several Limbu languages, e.g. Belhare, Athpare, Chintang and Chulung. Ethnically however, the Yakkha people perceive themselves as distinct from the other Kiranti groups such as Limbu.

== Geographical distribution ==
Mugali is spoken between Mugakhola and Sinuwakhola on the eastern banks of the Arun River in Dhankuta District, Province No. 1, Nepal, in the villages (VDC's) of Muga, Pakhribas, and Phalate.

Phangduwali is spoken above the Mugakhola headwaters in Pakhribas VDC, Dhankuta District, Province No. 1, Nepal.

Lumba-Yakkha is spoken in Arkhaule Jitpur and Marek Katahare VDC's, northern Dhankuta District, Province No. 1, Nepal.

== Phonology ==
=== Vowels ===
Yakkha has the five vowels [a], [e], [i], [o], [u]. There are no centralized vowels as in other Kiranti languages. Variation between short and long vowels is possible, but this is not a phonemic contrast, because no minimal pairs can be found. Diphthongs such as [oi̯], [ui̯], [ai̯] can be found in some words such as uimalaŋ "steep descent", or the interjection hoiʔ "Enough!".

	Front	Back
Close	i	u
Mid	e	o
Open	a	
Diphthong	/ai, au, oi, ui/	

=== Consonants ===
The consonants are shown in the table below. The voiced consonants in brackets have doubtful status. They are not phonemes, because no minimal pairs can be established. But they are also not motivated by a phonological rule. Furthermore, the voiced consonants occur only in a few words, and some of them are Nepali loans. Examples with initial voiced consonants are gogoba (an insect/worm), gʱak "all", jeppa "really", ɖaŋgak "stick".

		Labial	Alveolar	Postalveolar	Retroflex	Palatal	Velar	Glottal
Plosive	unaspirated	p (b)	t (d)		ʈ (ɖ)		k (ɡ)	ʔ
Plosive	aspirated	pʰ (bʱ)	tʰ (dʱ)		ʈʰ (ɖʱ)		kʰ (ɡʱ)	
Affricate	unaspirated		t͡s (d͡z)	(d͡ʒ)				
Affricate	aspirated		t͡sʰ (d͡zʱ)					
Fricative			s					h
Nasal		m (mʱ)	n (nʱ)				ŋ (ŋʱ)	
Approximant	unaspirated	w	l			j		
Approximant	aspirated	wʱ						
Trill			r					

Notes:

- A typical feature of Eastern Kiranti languages is the merger of voiced and voiceless obstruents, and Yakkha also exhibits this feature. Voicing occurs however optionally between vowels and after nasals. Unaspirated obstruents undergo this voicing rule more regularly than aspirated obstruents. Voiced consonants that are not motivated by a phonological rule exist, but they are rare.
- Another feature of the Yakkha sound system is the change of proto */r/ and */R/ to /y/, e.g. the word for salt is yum in Yakkha, but rum in Puma (Central Kiranti), and rɨm in Dumi (Western Kiranti).
- The rhotic [r] is not found word-initially, but in [Cr] clusters and in intervocalic position, as in makhruna "black" and tarokma "start".
- Several morphophonological processes operate in Yakkha, so that the underlying forms are not easy to establish. Many of these processes have to do with substitution by a nasal, e.g. in compound verbs like suncama "itch", the underlying verb stems are /sut/ and /ca/. To take an example from inflection, the verb sapthakma "like" is inflected sapthaŋmecuna "they (dual) like him". Other examples of morphophonological processes are the change of underlying et-se to [esse] (meaning "in order to hunt fish").
- Underspecified nasal prefixes assimilate in the place of articulation to the stem-initial consonant, e.g. m-baŋ "your-house", but n-chem "your-song".

== Morphology ==
Yakkha has rich nominal and verbal morphology. Nouns inflect for case and number. Verbs inflect for person, number (singular, dual, plural/nonsingular), negation, several categories in the domain of tense, aspect and mood. In transitive verbs, both actor and undergoer are coreferenced on the verb. The category of inclusive/exclusive is found in the verbal morphology and in the possessive pronouns and prefixes.

=== Pronouns ===
Yakkha pronouns distinguish between singular, dual and plural number, and the possessive pronouns additionally distinguish between the inclusion and the exclusion of the addressee. The third person only has singular and nonsingular forms. The possessive pronouns have developed from the personal pronouns and the genitive marker -ka. The possessive prefixes obviously are grammaticalised possessive pronouns. They can be used instead of the possessive pronouns, e.g. one could say akka paŋ or a-paŋ, both meaning "my house". Sounds represented by /N/ in the table are underspecified nasals.

			Personal pronoun	Possessive pronoun	Possessive prefix
1st person	singular		ka	akka	a-
1st person	dual	excl	kanciŋ	anciŋga	anciŋ-
1st person	dual	incl	kanciŋ	enciŋga	enciŋ-
1st person	plural	excl	kaniŋ	aniŋga	aniŋ-
1st person	plural	incl	kaniŋ	eŋga	eN-
2nd person	singular		nda	ŋga	N-
2nd person	dual		njiŋda	njiŋga	njiŋ-
2nd person	plural		nniŋda	nniŋga	nniŋ-
3rd person	singular		uŋ	ukka	u-
3rd person	nonsingular		uŋci	uŋciga	uŋci-

=== Plural marking ===
Yakkha marks non-singular on common nouns with the suffixing clitic =ci. There is no overt marking of singular.

ghak kucuma=ci=be
all dog=PL=LOC
"at/to all the dogs"

=== Interrogatives and indefinite reference ===
Yakkha has the following interrogative pronouns and other interrogatives: isa "who", i/ina "what", iya "what" (if many items or uncountables are asked for), hetna "which", imin "how", ijaŋ "why", hetne "where", hetniŋ "when". If a certain item is asked for, ina will be used, but if an event is in question, the root i occurs without further morphology, e.g. i leksa? "What happened?". Reduplication of the pronouns may result in indefinite reference, e.g. hetniŋ hetniŋ "some time".

=== Case system ===
Yakkha distinguishes the unmarked absolutive case, the ergative -ŋa, the genitive -ka/-ga, the locative -pe/-be, the ablative case -bhaŋ and the comitative case -nuŋ, and the instrumental case -ŋa.

- The absolutive marks subjects of intransitive verbs and objects of transitive verbs. In some verb classes (in the sense of valency classes), objects are marked with a locative or an instrumental. The ergative marks the agents of transitive verbs except for first and second person pronouns, which are in the unmarked nominative. Examples for absolutive and ergative case (overt arguments are often omitted in natural discourse, but the examples contain them to illustrate the case):

ka khemeŋna
"I go"

uŋ-ŋa uŋ tundwana
"he understands him"

- As in many other Kiranti languages, there is an ergative-instrumental syncretism, as both cases are marked by -ŋa. The instrumental is used to mark instruments in a broad sense, and also for temporal reference:

luŋkhwak-ŋa
stone-INS
"with/by means of a stone"

khiŋ-belaʔ-ŋa
this-time-INS
"thesedays"

- The genitive, marked by -ka/-ga marks the possessed item in possessive constructions, and materials:

ak-ka niŋ
I-GEN (prefix-)name
"my name"

siŋ-ga saŋghoŋ
wood-GEN stool
"wooden stool"

- The locative marks locations and goals of movement and transfer:

khorek-pe cuwa
bowl-LOC beer
"(There is) beer in a/the bowl."

- The comitative marks the accompaniment by someone or something. Also adverbials and adverbial clauses can be built with the comitative.

nda-nuŋ
"with you"

suha-nuŋ
"sour" (in adverbial use, e.g. taste sour)

=== Verbal morphology ===
- The verbal morphology is very complex, which is a typical feature of Kiranti languages. The outline given here necessarily provides a simplified picture. The verbal morphology is predominantly represented by suffixes, but one prefix slot exists, that is filled with an underspecified nasal that codes either third person plural or negation.
- Person and number of both actor and undergoer are indicated on the verb, and these affixes may differ according to the semantic role of their referent. For instance, the suffix -ka/-ga codes second person ("you"), regardless of the semantic role, while the suffix -m codes only (first and second person) agents, and the suffix -u only codes third person undergoer. There are syncretisms, for instance the already mentioned suffix -m, that stands for both agreement with first and second person plural (agent). Some relations are coded by a portmanteau morpheme, e.g. the first person acting on the second is coded by '-nen' (i.e. "I understand/call/kiss etc. YOU"), supplemented by number suffixes if necessary.
- Another feature typical for Kiranti verbal morphology is the copying of nasals into syllable codas in the suffix string of a finite verb. For instance, the negated form of tum-me-ŋ-c-u-ŋ-ci-ŋa "we (dual, excl) understand them" is n-dum-me-n-c-u-n-ci-ŋa-n-na, where the negation marker -n is copied several times.
- As for tense, the nonpast is overtly marked by -meʔ or -wa. Both suffixes have their origin in grammaticalized lexical verbs ("do" and "be/exist" respectively). They occupy different slots in the verbal suffix template. The past is marked by the suffix -a, which is often elided to avoid hiatus in underlying vowel sequences. The perfect tense is built by the addition of the suffixes -ma or -uks to the past morpheme, and the past perfect tense is built by further addition of the suffix -sa to this suffix string.
- As for mood, the imperative is also coded by the suffix -a, e.g. ab-a "Come!" In transitive verbs with a third person patient, the overt suffix is -u, and the imperative suffix is not overtly realised. The subjunctive mood has no dedicated marker, it is marked precisely by the absence of anything but the agreement morphology, e.g. ciya hops-u-m? "Shall we have tea?" (tea sip-3P-1A). The subjunctive mood also expresses warnings, suggestions and potential situations in some subordinate clause types.

== Sample text ==
The following is a sample text in Yakkha, of Article 1 of the Universal Declaration of Human Rights, with a transliteration (IAST) and transcription (IPA).

Yakkha in Devanagari Script
घाक ओथोक चि चोननुङ नुङ तोक्लागा युक्थाम्बे वामानासोलोक निङवायोक नुङ इकले ङ्वाम्याहा। उङचि निङवा नुङ साघु तोक्साङन्दा यानेसाहा साहा ङवाम्याहा न्हाङ एको हेकोनाबे फुनुन्छागा बेभार चोक्माहा।

Transcription (IPA)

ɡʰak otʰokʌ tsi tsonʌnuŋʌ nuŋʌ toklaɡa juktʰambe wabanasolokʌ niŋʌwajokʌ nuŋʌ ikʌle ŋwamjaha. uŋʌtsi niŋʌwa nuŋʌ saɡʰu toksaŋʌnda janesaha saha ŋʌwamjaha nhaŋʌ eko hekonabe pʰununtsʰaɡa bebʰarʌ tsokmaha.

Translation (grammatical)

All human beings are born free and equal in dignity and rights. They are endowed with reason and conscience and should act towards one another in a spirit of brotherhood.

== Bibliography ==
- Driem, George van (1990), The fall and rise of the phoneme /r/ in Eastern Kiranti: sound change in Tibeto-Burman. Bulletin of the School of Oriental and African Studies 53, 83 – 86.
- Driem, George van (1994): The Yakkha verb: interpretation and analysis of the Omruwa material (a Kiranti language of Eastern Nepal). Bulletin of the School of Oriental and African Studies 57, 347 – 355.
- Driem, George van (2004): Newaric and Mahakiranti. In: Saxena, Anju: Himalayan Languages – past and present. Mouton de Gruyter, Berlin.
- Grierson, George A. (1909): Tibeto-Burman family, Part I, General Introduction, specimens of the Tibetan dialects, the Himalayan dialects and the North Assam group., Vol. III of Linguistic Survey of India, Superintendent of Government Printing, India, Calcutta.
- Kongren, Ramji (2007a): Yakkha Jatiko Samskar ra Samskriti (Yakkha Indigenous People’s Tradition and Culture). Kirat Yakkha Chumma (Indigenous Peoples Yakkha Organization), Kathmandu.
- Kongren, Ramji (2007b): Yakkha–Nepali–English Dictionary. Kirant Yakkha Chumma (Indigenous Peoples Yakkha Organization), Kathmandu.
- Schackow, Diana (2014). A grammar of Yakkha (phd thesis). University of Zurich. doi:10.5167/uzh-109528.
- Schackow, Diana (2015). A Grammar of Yakkha. Studies in Diversity Linguistics 7. Berlin: Language Science Press. doi:10.17169/langsci.b66.12. - published and revised from 2014 thesis
- Winter, Werner, Gerd Hansson, Alfons Weidert and Bikram Ingwaba Subba (1996): A Synoptic Glossary of Athpare, Belhare and Yakkha. Lincom Europa, München.
