= 2011 Nepal census =

11th national census of Nepal

- 2011

General information
- Country: Nepal
- Authority: Central Bureau of Statistics
- Website: www.cbs.gov.np

Results
- Total population: 26,494,504 (▲14.44%)
- Most populous Development Region: Central (9,656,985)
- Least populous Development Region: Far-Western (2,552,517)

The 2011 Nepal census was the 11th national census of Nepal. It was conducted by Central Bureau of Statistics. It marked 100 years of census-taking in Nepal.

Working in cooperation with the country's 58 municipalities and the 3,915 Village Development Committees at the district level, the bureau recorded data from all the municipalities and villages of each district. The data included statistics on population size, households, sex and age distribution, place of birth, residence characteristics, literacy, marital status, religion, language spoken, caste/ethnic group, economically active population, education, number of children, employment status, and occupation.

== Key findings ==
The key findings of 2011 census are as follows:

| Total population | 26,494,504 |
| Intercensal change | 3,343,081 |
| Intercensal change percentage | 14.44% |
| Annual growth rate | 1.35% |
| Population density (per km^{2}) | 180 |
| Total households | 5,427,302 |
| Male population | 12,849,041 |
| Female population | 13,645,463 |
| Gender ratio | 94.2 |
| Literacy rate | 65.9% |

== Population distribution ==
Population by ecological region (2011)
| Ecological region | Population | Percentage (%) | Sex ratio | Annual growth rate (%) | Density (per km^{2}) |
|---|---|---|---|---|---|
| Mountain | 1,781,792 | 6.7 | 93.84 | 0.54 | 34 |
| Hill | 11,394,007 | 43.0 | 91.37 | 1.06 | 186 |
| Terai | 13,318,705 | 50.3 | 96.66 | 1.72 | 392 |
| Nepal | 26,494,504 | 100 | 94.16 | 1.35 | 180 |

Population by development region (2011)
| Development region | Population | Percentage (%) | Sex ratio | Annual growth rate (%) | Density (per km^{2}) |
|---|---|---|---|---|---|
| Eastern | 5,811,555 | 21.93 | 92.37 | 0.84 | 204 |
| Central | 9,656,985 | 36.45 | 100.55 | 1.84 | 352 |
| Western | 4,926,765 | 18.60 | 87.03 | 0.75 | 168 |
| Mid-Western | 3,546,682 | 13.39 | 92.73 | 1.63 | 84 |
| Far-Western | 2,552,517 | 9.63 | 91.25 | 1.53 | 131 |
| Nepal | 26,494,504 | 100 | 94.16 | 1.35 | 180 |

In 2015, Nepal adopted federalism and existing development regions and zones were abolished. The existing districts were regrouped into seven provinces. The population of those provinces are as follows:

Population by province (2011)
| Province | Population | Percentage (%) | Sex ratio | Density (per km^{2}) |
|---|---|---|---|---|
| Koshi | 4,534,943 | 17.12 | 91 | 175 |
| Madhesh | 5,404,145 | 20.40 | 101 | 559 |
| Bagmati | 5,529,452 | 20.87 | 99 | 272 |
| Gandaki | 2,403,757 | 9.07 | 83 | 112 |
| Lumbini | 4,499,272 | 16.98 | 91 | 202 |
| Karnali | 1,570,418 | 5.93 | 96 | 56 |
| Sudurpashchim | 2,552,517 | 9.63 | 91 | 131 |
| Nepal | 26,494,504 | 100 | 94 | 180 |

== Population by district ==
Population by district (2011)
| S.N | Development region (until 2015) | Province (since 2015) | District | Population | Sex ratio | Annual growth rate (%) | Density (per km^{2}) |
|---|---|---|---|---|---|---|---|
| 1 | Eastern | Koshi | Taplejung | 127,461 | 90.50 | -0.55 | 35 |
| 2 | Eastern | Koshi | Sankhuwasabha | 158,742 | 90.07 | -0.03 | 46 |
| 3 | Eastern | Koshi | Solukhumbu | 105,886 | 93.63 | -0.17 | 32 |
| 4 | Eastern | Koshi | Panchthar | 191,817 | 88.74 | -0.52 | 155 |
| 5 | Eastern | Koshi | Ilam | 290,254 | 94.63 | 0.26 | 170 |
| 6 | Eastern | Koshi | Dhankuta | 163,412 | 88.05 | -0.19 | 183 |
| 7 | Eastern | Koshi | Tehrathum | 101,577 | 86.63 | -1.08 | 150 |
| 8 | Eastern | Koshi | Bhojpur | 182,459 | 89.26 | -1.07 | 121 |
| 9 | Eastern | Koshi | Okhaldhunga | 147,984 | 86.62 | -0.57 | 138 |
| 10 | Eastern | Koshi | Khotang | 206,312 | 88.90 | -1.15 | 130 |
| 11 | Eastern | Koshi | Udayapur | 317,532 | 89.21 | 0.99 | 154 |
| 12 | Eastern | Koshi | Jhapa | 812,650 | 90.07 | 1.66 | 506 |
| 13 | Eastern | Koshi | Morang | 965,370 | 93.57 | 1.35 | 520 |
| 14 | Eastern | Koshi | Sunsari | 763,487 | 94.64 | 1.99 | 607 |
| 15 | Eastern | Madhesh | Saptari | 639,284 | 96.44 | 1.14 | 469 |
| 16 | Eastern | Madhesh | Siraha | 637,328 | 94.77 | 1.07 | 536 |
| 17 | Central | Bagmati | Dolakha | 186,557 | 85.47 | -0.91 | 85 |
| 18 | Central | Bagmati | Sindhupalchok | 287,798 | 92.58 | -0.61 | 113 |
| 19 | Central | Bagmati | Rasuwa | 43,300 | 98.40 | -0.33 | 28 |
| 20 | Central | Bagmati | Kavrepalanchok | 381,937 | 91.93 | -0.61 | 274 |
| 21 | Central | Bagmati | Lalitpur | 468,132 | 103.49 | 3.26 | 1,216 |
| 22 | Central | Bagmati | Bhaktapur | 304,651 | 103.42 | 3.01 | 2,560 |
| 23 | Central | Bagmati | Kathmandu | 1,744,240 | 109.84 | 4.78 | 4,416 |
| 24 | Central | Bagmati | Nuwakot | 277,471 | 91.78 | -0.39 | 248 |
| 25 | Central | Bagmati | Sindhuli | 296,192 | 92.25 | 0.57 | 119 |
| 26 | Central | Bagmati | Ramechhap | 202,646 | 87.39 | -0.47 | 131 |
| 27 | Central | Bagmati | Dhading | 336,067 | 88.55 | -0.08 | 174 |
| 28 | Central | Bagmati | Makwanpur | 420,477 | 96.67 | 0.69 | 173 |
| 29 | Central | Bagmati | Chitawan | 579,984 | 92.75 | 2.06 | 261 |
| 30 | Central | Madhesh | Dhanusha | 754,777 | 100.61 | 1.17 | 640 |
| 31 | Central | Madhesh | Mahottari | 627,580 | 98.25 | 1.26 | 626 |
| 32 | Central | Madhesh | Sarlahi | 769,729 | 102.57 | 1.91 | 611 |
| 33 | Central | Madhesh | Rautahat | 686,722 | 104.60 | 2.31 | 610 |
| 34 | Central | Madhesh | Bara | 687,708 | 104.39 | 2.07 | 578 |
| 35 | Central | Madhesh | Parsa | 601,017 | 108.21 | 1.90 | 444 |
| 36 | Western | Gandaki | Manang | 6,538 | 127.25 | -3.83 | 3 |
| 37 | Western | Gandaki | Mustang | 13,452 | 111.54 | 1.08 | 4 |
| 38 | Western | Gandaki | Gorkha | 271,061 | 80.68 | -0.61 | 75 |
| 39 | Western | Gandaki | Lamjung | 167,724 | 82.68 | -0.55 | 99 |
| 40 | Western | Gandaki | Tanahun | 323,288 | 79.73 | 0.25 | 209 |
| 41 | Western | Gandaki | Syangja | 289,148 | 77.05 | -0.93 | 248 |
| 42 | Western | Gandaki | Kaski | 492,098 | 92.44 | 2.57 | 244 |
| 43 | Western | Gandaki | Myagdi | 113,641 | 82.57 | -0.07 | 49 |
| 44 | Western | Gandaki | Parbat | 146,590 | 80.33 | -0.74 | 297 |
| 45 | Western | Gandaki | Baglung | 268,613 | 78.34 | -0.01 | 151 |
| 46 | Western | Lumbini | Gulmi | 280,160 | 76.02 | -0.57 | 244 |
| 47 | Western | Lumbini | Palpa | 261,180 | 79.70 | -0.28 | 190 |
| 48 | Western | Lumbini | Arghakhanchi | 197,632 | 77.46 | -0.53 | 166 |
| 49 | Western | Lumbini | Rupandehi | 880,196 | 96.47 | 2.17 | 646 |
| 50 | Western | Lumbini | Kapilvastu | 571,936 | 99.74 | 1.17 | 329 |
| 51 | Western | N/A | Nawalparasi | 643,508 | 89.36 | 1.34 | 298 |
| 52 | Mid Western | Karnali | Dolpa | 36,700 | 98.79 | 2.17 | 5 |
| 53 | Mid Western | Karnali | Jumla | 108,921 | 101.62 | 1.97 | 43 |
| 54 | Mid Western | Karnali | Kalikot | 136,948 | 101.05 | 2.60 | 79 |
| 55 | Mid Western | Karnali | Mugu | 55,286 | 102.80 | 2.30 | 16 |
| 56 | Mid Western | Karnali | Humla | 50,858 | 103.23 | 2.25 | 9 |
| 57 | Mid Western | Karnali | Salyan | 242,444 | 91.69 | 1.27 | 166 |
| 58 | Mid Western | Karnali | Surkhet | 350,804 | 93.41 | 1.95 | 143 |
| 59 | Mid Western | Karnali | Dailekh | 261,770 | 94.22 | 1.50 | 174 |
| 60 | Mid Western | Karnali | Jajarkot | 171,304 | 99.73 | 2.39 | 77 |
| 61 | Mid Western | N/A | Rukum | 208,567 | 90.63 | 1.01 | 72 |
| 62 | Mid Western | Lumbini | Pyuthan | 228,102 | 78.14 | 0.71 | 174 |
| 63 | Mid Western | Lumbini | Rolpa | 224,506 | 84.92 | 0.67 | 119 |
| 64 | Mid Western | Lumbini | Dang | 552,583 | 89.55 | 1.78 | 187 |
| 65 | Mid Western | Lumbini | Banke | 491,313 | 98.87 | 2.42 | 210 |
| 66 | Mid Western | Lumbini | Bardiya | 426,576 | 92.59 | 1.09 | 211 |
| 67 | Far Western | Sudurpashchim | Bajura | 134,912 | 95.22 | 2.15 | 62 |
| 68 | Far Western | Sudurpashchim | Bajhang | 195,159 | 90.65 | 1.56 | 57 |
| 69 | Far Western | Sudurpashchim | Darchula | 133,274 | 91.30 | 0.88 | 57 |
| 70 | Far Western | Sudurpashchim | Achham | 257,477 | 87.30 | 1.07 | 153 |
| 71 | Far Western | Sudurpashchim | Doti | 211,746 | 84.94 | 0.22 | 105 |
| 72 | Far Western | Sudurpashchim | Dadeldhura | 142,094 | 88.11 | 1.19 | 92 |
| 73 | Far Western | Sudurpashchim | Baitadi | 250,898 | 87.95 | 0.68 | 165 |
| 74 | Far Western | Sudurpashchim | Kailali | 775,709 | 95.25 | 2.29 | 240 |
| 75 | Far Western | Sudurpashchim | Kanchanpur | 451,248 | 91.85 | 1.77 | 280 |
| Nepal | | | | 26,494,504 | 94.16 | 1.35 | 180 |

In 2015, when the federal structure was adopted, the districts of Nawalparasi and Rukum were each divided into two parts, resulting in four new districts. The population of those four districts are as follows:

| Former district (until 2015) | New district (since 2015) | Province | Population | Sex ratio |
|---|---|---|---|---|
| Nawalparasi | Nawalparasi (East)/Nawalpur | Gandaki | 311,604 | 84.57 |
| Nawalparasi | Nawalparasi (West)/Parasi | Lumbini | 331,904 | 94.09 |
| Rukum | Eastern Rukum | Lumbini | 53,184 | 88.57 |
| Rukum | Western Rukum | Karnali | 155,383 | 91.35 |

== Population by caste/ethnicity ==
The population wise ranking of 124 Nepalese castes/ethnic groups as per 2011 Nepal census. (Note: Pages 191/192 of the total pdf or pages 156/157 in the scanned material shows Nepalese castes/ethnic groups)

| S.N | Caste/Ethnicity | Population (2011) | Percentage (%) |
|---|---|---|---|
| 1 | Chhetri | 4,398,053 | 16.60 |
| 2 | Brahmin-Hill (Bahun) | 3,226,903 | 12.18 |
| 3 | Magar | 1,887,733 | 7.12 |
| 4 | Tharu | 1,737,470 | 6.56 |
| 5 | Tamang | 1,539,830 | 5.81 |
| 6 | Newar | 1,321,933 | 4.99 |
| 7 | Kami | 1,258,554 | 4.75 |
| 8 | Nepali Muslim | 1,164,255 | 4.39 |
| 9 | Yadav | 1,054,458 | 3.98 |
| 10 | Rai | 620,004 | 2.34 |
| 11 | Gurung | 522,641 | 1.97 |
| 12 | Damai/Dholi | 472,862 | 1.78 |
| 13 | Thakuri | 425,623 | 1.61 |
| 14 | Limbu | 387,300 | 1.46 |
| 15 | Sarki | 374,816 | 1.41 |
| 16 | Teli | 369,688 | 1.40 |
| 17 | Chamar/Harijan/Ram | 335,893 | 1.27 |
| 18 | Kushwaha | 306,393 | 1.16 |
| 19 | Musahar | 234,490 | 0.89 |
| 20 | Kurmi | 231,129 | 0.87 |
| 21 | Sanyasi/Dasnami | 227,822 | 0.86 |
| 22 | Dhanuk | 219,808 | 0.83 |
| 23 | Kanu/Haluwai | 209,053 | 0.79 |
| 24 | Dusadh/Pasawan/Pasi | 208,910 | 0.79 |
| 25 | Mallaha | 173,261 | 0.65 |
| 26 | Kewat | 153,772 | 0.58 |
| 27 | Kathbaniya | 138,637 | 0.52 |
| 28 | Brahmin-Terai | 134,106 | 0.51 |
| 29 | Kalwar | 128,232 | 0.48 |
| 30 | Kumal | 121,196 | 0.45 |
| 31 | Bhujel | 118,650 | 0.44 |
| 32 | Hajam/Thakur | 117,758 | 0.43 |
| 33 | Rajbanshi | 115,242 | 0.43 |
| 34 | Sherpa | 112,946 | 0.41 |
| 35 | Dhobi | 109,079 | 0.40 |
| 36 | Tatma/Tatwa | 104,865 | 0.38 |
| 37 | Lohar | 101,421 | 0.38 |
| 38 | Khatwe | 100,921 | 0.35 |
| 39 | Sudhi | 93,115 | 0.32 |
| 40 | Danuwar | 84,115 | 0.32 |
| 41 | Majhi | 83,727 | 0.30 |
| 42 | Barai | 80,597 | 0.28 |
| 43 | Bin | 75,195 | 0.27 |
| 44 | Nuniya | 70,540 | 0.26 |
| 45 | Chepang | 68,399 | 0.24 |
| 46 | Sonar | 64,335 | 0.24 |
| 47 | Kumhar | 62,399 | 0.21 |
| 48 | Sunuwar | 55,712 | 0.21 |
| 49 | Bantar/Sardar | 55,104 | 0.21 |
| 50 | Kahar | 53,159 | 0.20 |
| 51 | Santhal | 51,735 | 0.20 |
| 52 | Marwadi | 51,443 | 0.19 |
| 53 | Kayastha | 44,304 | 0.17 |
| 54 | Rajput/Terai Kshetriya | 41,972 | 0.16 |
| 55 | Badi | 38,603 | 0.15 |
| 56 | Jhangar/Uraon | 37,424 | 0.14 |
| 57 | Gangai | 36,988 | 0.12 |
| 58 | Lodh | 32,837 | 0.11 |
| 59 | Badhaee | 28,932 | 0.11 |
| 60 | Thami | 28,671 | 0.11 |
| 61 | Kulung | 28,613 | 0.1 |
| 62 | Bengali | 26,582 | 0.1 |
| 63 | Gaderi/Bhediyar/Gangajali | 26,375 | 0.1 |
| 64 | Dhimal | 26,298 | 0.09 |
| 65 | Yakkha | 24,336 | 0.09 |
| 66 | Ghale | 22,881 | 0.07 |
| 67 | Tajpuriya | 19,213 | 0.07 |
| 68 | Khawas | 18,513 | 0.06 |
| 69 | Darai | 16,789 | 0.06 |
| 70 | Mali | 14,995 | 0.06 |
| 71 | Dhuniya | 14,846 | 0.05 |
| 72 | Pahari | 13,615 | 0.05 |
| 73 | Rajdhob | 13,422 | 0.05 |
| 74 | Bhote | 13,397 | 0.05 |
| 75 | Dom | 13,268 | 0.05 |
| 76 | Thakali | 13,215 | 0.05 |
| 77 | Kori | 12,276 | 0.04 |
| 78 | Chhantyal | 11,810 | 0.04 |
| 79 | Hyolmo | 10,752 | 0.04 |
| 80 | Bote | 10,397 | 0.04 |
| 81 | Rajbhar | 9,542 | 0.03 |
| 82 | Brahmu/Baramo | 8,140 | 0.03 |
| 83 | Punjabi | 7,176 | 0.03 |
| 84 | Nachhring | 7,154 | 0.03 |
| 85 | Yamphu | 6,933 | 0.03 |
| 86 | Gaine | 6,791 | 0.03 |
| 87 | Chamling | 6,668 | 0.02 |
| 88 | Athpahariya | 5,977 | 0.02 |
| 89 | Jirel | 5,774 | 0.02 |
| 90 | Dura | 5,394 | 0.02 |
| 91 | Sarabaria | 4,906 | 0.02 |
| 92 | Meche | 4,867 | 0.02 |
| 93 | Bantawa | 4,604 | 0.02 |
| 94 | Raji | 4,235 | 0.02 |
| 95 | Dolpo | 4,107 | 0.02 |
| 96 | Halkhor | 4,003 | 0.01 |
| 97 | Byansi/Sauka | 3,895 | 0.01 |
| 98 | Amat | 3,830 | 0.01 |
| 99 | Thulung | 3,535 | 0.01 |
| 100 | Lepcha | 3,445 | 0.01 |
| 101 | Patharkatt /Kushwadiya | 3,182 | 0.01 |
| 102 | Mewahang | 3,100 | 0.01 |
| 103 | Bahing | 3,096 | 0.01 |
| 104 | Natuwa | 3,062 | 0.01 |
| 105 | Hayu | 2,925 | 0.01 |
| 106 | Dhankar/Dharikar | 2,681 | 0.01 |
| 107 | Lhopa | 2,624 | 0.01 |
| 108 | Munda | 2,350 | 0.01 |
| 109 | Dev | 2,147 | 0.01 |
| 110 | Dhandi | 1,982 | 0.01 |
| 111 | Kamar | 1,787 | 0.01 |
| 112 | Kisan | 1,739 | 0.01 |
| 113 | Sampang | 1,681 | 0.01 |
| 114 | Koche | 1,635 | 0.01 |
| 115 | Lhomi | 1,614 | 0.01 |
| 116 | Khaling | 1,571 | 0.01 |
| 117 | Topkegola | 1,523 | 0.01 |
| 118 | Chidimar | 1,254 | 0.00 |
| 119 | Walung | 1,249 | 0.00 |
| 120 | Lohorung | 1,153 | 0.00 |
| 121 | Kalar | 1,077 | 0.00 |
| 122 | Raute | 618 | 0.00 |
| 123 | Nurang | 278 | 0.00 |
| 124 | Kusunda | 273 | 0.00 |
| Dalit Others | | 155,354 | 0.59 |
| Janajati Others | | 1,228 | 0.00 |
| Terai Others | | 103,811 | 0.39 |
| Undefined Others | | 15,277 | 0.06 |
| Foreigners | | 6,651 | 0.03 |
| Total | | 26,494,504 | 100 |

== Population by language ==
Languages by number of native speakers (2011)
| S.N | Language | Number of speakers | Percentage |
|---|---|---|---|
| 1 | Nepali | 11,826,953 | 44.64% |
| 2 | Maithili | 3,092,530 | 11.67% |
| 3 | Bhojpuri | 1,584,958 | 5.98% |
| 4 | Tharu | 1,529,875 | 5.77% |
| 5 | Tamang | 1,353,311 | 5.11% |
| 6 | Nepal Bhasa (Newar) | 846,557 | 3.20% |
| 7 | Bajjika | 793,416 | 2.99% |
| 8 | Magar | 788,530 | 2.98% |
| 9 | Dotyali/Doteli | 787,827 | 2.97% |
| 10 | Urdu | 691,546 | 2.61% |
| 11 | Awadhi | 501,752 | 1.89% |
| 12 | Limbu | 343,603 | 1.30% |
| 13 | Gurung | 325,622 | 1.23% |
| 14 | Baitadeli | 272,524 | 1.03% |
| 15 | Rai (Kiranti) | 159,114 | 0.60% |
| 16 | Aachami | 142,787 | 0.54% |
| 17 | Bantawa (Rai) | 132,583 | 0.50% |
| 18 | Rajbanshi | 122,214 | 0.46% |
| 19 | Sherpa | 114,830 | 0.43% |
| 20 | Hindi | 77,569 | 0.29% |
| 21 | Chamling (Rai) | 76,800 | 0.29% |
| 22 | Bajhangi | 67,581 | 0.26% |
| 23 | Santhali | 49,858 | 0.19% |
| 24 | Chepang | 48,476 | 0.18% |
| 25 | Danuwar | 45,821 | 0.17% |
| 26 | Sunuwar | 37,898 | 0.14% |
| 27 | Magahi | 35,614 | 0.13% |
| 28 | Uranw/Kurux | 33,651 | 0.13% |
| 29 | Kulung (Rai) | 33,170 | 0.13% |
| 30 | Kham (Magar) | 27,113 | 0.10% |
| 31 | Rajasthani | 25,394 | 0.10% |
| 32 | Majhi | 24,422 | 0.09% |
| 33 | Thami | 23,151 | 0.09% |
| 34 | Bhujel | 21,715 | 0.08% |
| 35 | Bengali | 21,061 | 0.08% |
| 36 | Thulung (Rai) | 20,659 | 0.08% |
| 37 | Yakkha | 19,558 | 0.07% |
| 38 | Dhimal | 19,300 | 0.07% |
| 39 | Tajpuriya | 18,811 | 0.07% |
| 40 | Angika | 18,555 | 0.07% |
| 41 | Sampang (Rai) | 18,270 | 0.07% |
| 42 | Khaling (Rai) | 14,467 | 0.05% |
| 43 | Wambule (Rai) | 13,470 | 0.05% |
| 44 | Kumal | 12,222 | 0.05% |
| 45 | Darai | 11,677 | 0.04% |
| 46 | Bahing (Rai) | 11,658 | 0.04% |
| 47 | Bajureli | 10,704 | 0.04% |
| 48 | Hyolmo | 10,176 | 0.04% |
| 49 | Nachiring (Rai) | 10,041 | 0.04% |
| 50 | Yamphu (Rai) | 9,208 | 0.03% |
| 51 | Bote | 8,766 | 0.03% |
| 52 | Ghale | 8,092 | 0.03% |
| 53 | Dumi (Rai) | 7,638 | 0.03% |
| 54 | Lepcha | 7,499 | 0.03% |
| 55 | Puma (Rai) | 6,686 | 0.03% |
| 56 | Dungmali (Rai) | 6,260 | 0.02% |
| 57 | Darchuleli | 5,928 | 0.02% |
| 58 | Aathpariya (Rai) | 5,530 | 0.02% |
| 59 | Thakali | 5,242 | 0.02% |
| 60 | Jirel | 4,829 | 0.02% |
| 61 | Mewahang (Rai) | 4,650 | 0.02% |
| 62 | Sign Language | 4,476 | 0.02% |
| 63 | Tibetan | 4,445 | 0.02% |
| 64 | Meche | 4,375 | 0.02% |
| 65 | Chhantyal | 4,283 | 0.02% |
| 66 | Raji | 3,758 | 0.01% |
| 67 | Lohorung (Rai) | 3,716 | 0.01% |
| 68 | Chhintang (Rai) | 3,712 | 0.01% |
| 69 | Gangai | 3,612 | 0.01% |
| 70 | Pahari | 3,458 | 0.01% |
| 71 | Dailekhi | 3,102 | 0.01% |
| 72 | Lhopa | 3,029 | 0.01% |
| 73 | Dura | 2,156 | 0.01% |
| 74 | Koch | 2,080 | 0.01% |
| 75 | Chiling (Rai) | 2,046 | 0.01% |
| 76 | English | 2,045 | 0.01% |
| 77 | Jerung (Rai) | 1,763 | 0.01% |
| 78 | Khas | 1,747 | 0.01% |
| 79 | Sanskrit | 1,669 | 0.01% |
| 80 | Dolpali | 1,667 | 0.01% |
| 81 | Hayu | 1,520 | 0.01% |
| 82 | Tilung (Rai) | 1,424 | 0.01% |
| 83 | Koi (Rai) | 1,271 | 0.00% |
| 84 | Kisan | 1,178 | 0.00% |
| 85 | Waling (Rai) | 1,169 | 0.00% |
| 86 | Musalman | 1,075 | 0.00% |
| 87 | Hariyani/Haryanvi | 889 | 0.00% |
| 88 | Jumli | 851 | 0.00% |
| 89 | Lhomi | 808 | 0.00% |
| 90 | Punjabi | 808 | 0.00% |
| 91 | Belhare (Rai) | 599 | 0.00% |
| 92 | Odia | 584 | 0.00% |
| 93 | Sonaha | 579 | 0.00% |
| 94 | Sindhi | 518 | 0.00% |
| 95 | Dadeldhuri | 488 | 0.00% |
| 96 | Byangshi | 480 | 0.00% |
| 97 | Assamese | 476 | 0.00% |
| 98 | Raute | 461 | 0.00% |
| 99 | Saam (Rai) | 401 | 0.00% |
| 100 | Manange | 392 | 0.00% |
| 101 | Dhuleli | 347 | 0.00% |
| 102 | Phangduali (Rai) | 290 | 0.00% |
| 103 | Surel | 287 | 0.00% |
| 104 | Malpande | 247 | 0.00% |
| 105 | Chinese | 242 | 0.00% |
| 106 | Khariya | 238 | 0.00% |
| 107 | Kurmali | 227 | 0.00% |
| 108 | Baram | 155 | 0.00% |
| 109 | Lingkhim (Rai) | 129 | 0.00% |
| 110 | Sadhani | 122 | 0.00% |
| 111 | Kagate | 99 | 0.00% |
| 112 | Dzongkha | 80 | 0.00% |
| 113 | Bankariya | 69 | 0.00% |
| 114 | Kaike | 50 | 0.00% |
| 115 | Garhwali (Gadhawali) | 38 | 0.00% |
| 116 | French | 34 | 0.00% |
| 117 | Mizo | 32 | 0.00% |
| 118 | Kuki | 29 | 0.00% |
| 119 | Kusunda | 28 | 0.00% |
| 120 | Russian | 17 | 0.00% |
| 121 | Spanish | 16 | 0.00% |
| 122 | Nagamese | 10 | 0.00% |
| 123 | Arabic | 8 | 0.00% |
| Not reported | | 47,718 | 0.18% |
| Others | | 21,173 | 0.08% |
| Total | | 26,494,504 | 100% |

Languages by number of second-language speakers (2011)
| Language | Number of speakers | Percentage |
|---|---|---|
| Nepali | 8,682,499 | 32.77% |
| Hindi | 1,225,950 | 4.62% |
| Maithili | 195, 287 | 0.73% |
| Bhojpuri | 159,518 | 0.60% |
| Tharu | 84,748 | 0.32% |
| English | 81,447 | 0.30% |
| Bajjika | 60,863 | 0.23% |
| Urdu | 45,766 | 0.17% |
| Awadhi | 45,428 | 0.17% |
| Magar | 42,952 | 0.16% |
| Tamang | 33,450 | 0.12% |
| Nepal Bhasa (Newar) | 32,594 | 0.12% |
| Sanskrit | 2,975 | 0.01% |
| Others | 190,327 | 0.72% |
| Total | 10,883,804 | 41.04% |

== See also ==
- List of village development committees of Nepal (Former)
- 1991 Nepal census
- 2001 Nepal census
- 2021 Nepal census
