= Jitpur =

Jitpur may refer to:

- Arkhaule Jitpur, Nepal
- Bhawanipur Jitpur, Nepal
- Jitpur Arkhaule, Nepal
- Jitpur, Ilam, Nepal
- Jitpur, Narayani, Nepal
- Paschim Jitpur, India
- Jitpur, Jharkhand, India
