= Belhare language =

Kiranti language spoken in Nepal

Belhare
- Region: Dhankuta district, Nepal
- Ethnicity: Kirat Athpare of Belhara
- Native speakers: 2,000 (2017)
- Language family: Sino-Tibetan: Kiranti; Eastern; Greater Yakkha; Belhare

Language codes
- ISO 639-3: byw
- Glottolog: belh1239
- ELP: Belhariya

Belhare (Nepali: Belhāreor), also known as Athpariya II (not to be confused with Athpariya I), is a Kiranti language spoken by some 2,000 people living on Belhara Hill, at the southern foothills of the Himalayas situated in the Dhankuta District, Koshi Province in eastern Nepal. All speakers of Belhare are bilingual in Nepali, which results in frequent code mixing and a large amount of Nepali loan-words. Nevertheless, the grammar of Belhare has maintained its distinct Kiranti characteristics.

== Geographical distribution ==
Belhare is spoken on Belhara ridge in Dhankuta District.

== Status ==
Belhare is acquired by children natively, though all speakers are all bilingual in Nepali, and Nepali influence is rampant in Belhare discourse. Younger people cannot speak Belhare as well as Nepali, so speakers of Belhare use Nepali when speaking with them. Most fluent speakers are elderly. Parents largely teach their children Nepali over Belhare, due to its dominance in education, job opportunities, and education. Belhare is not written and only oral literature is available in it. Ichchha Purna Rai characterizes Belhare as "one of the most endangered languages in Nepal".

== Classification ==
The closest relatives of Belhare are, according to Balthasar Bickel, Athpare, Yakkha, Chintang, and probably Chulung. Previously, it was classified as a dialect of Athpare.

== Phonology ==
The phonemes in parentheses only occur in loanwords from Nepali.

=== Consonants ===
			Bilabial	Apical	Palatal	Velar	Glottal
Nasal			m ⟨m⟩	n ⟨n⟩		ŋ ⟨ŋ⟩	
Plosive/ Affricate	voiceless	unaspirated	p ⟨p⟩	t ⟨t⟩	ts ⟨c⟩	k ⟨k⟩	ʔ ⟨ʔ⟩
Plosive/ Affricate	voiceless	aspirated	pʰ ⟨ph⟩	tʰ ⟨th⟩	tsʰ ⟨ch⟩	kʰ ⟨kh⟩	ʔ ⟨ʔ⟩
Plosive/ Affricate	voiced	unaspirated	b ⟨b⟩	d ⟨d⟩	(dz ⟨j⟩)	ɡ ⟨g⟩	ʔ ⟨ʔ⟩
Plosive/ Affricate	voiced	aspirated	(bʱ ⟨bh⟩)	(dʱ ⟨dh⟩)	(dzʱ ⟨jh⟩)	(ɡʱ ⟨gh⟩)	ʔ ⟨ʔ⟩
Fricative				s ⟨s⟩			h ⟨h⟩
Lateral				l ⟨l⟩			
Trill		unaspirated		r ⟨r⟩			
Trill		aspirated		(rʱ ⟨rh⟩)			
Approximant			w ⟨w⟩		j ⟨y⟩		

=== Vowels ===
	front	central	back
close	i ĩ		u ũ
mid	e	ʌ	o
open		a	

=== Phonotactics ===
The canonical syllable structure for Belhare is (C)V(C), where C represents any consonant and V any vowel.

== Morphology ==
Like other Kiranti languages, Belhare is characterized by an elaborate morphology in both the nominal and verbal domain. Syntactically, Belhare has partly an accusative, partly an ergative pivot, but accusative syntax is more prominent in terms of frequency.
