= Dandagaun, Dhankuta =

Coordinates: 27°10′N 87°21′E

Dandagaun डाँडागाउँ
- Mahalaxmi municipality -3
- Nicknames: Hamro Gaun, Ramro Gaun
- Interactive map of Dandagaun
- Country: Nepal
- Province: Province No. 1
- Municipality: Mahalaxmi Municipality 3
- District: Dhankuta District
- Established: 2017

Government

Area
  - Total: 14.5 km^{2} (5.6 sq mi)

Population (2017)
  - Total: 2,500 + ( estimated )
  - Density: 170/km^{2} (450/sq mi)
- Time zone: UTC+5:45 (Nepal Time)
- Postal codes: 026,

Dandagaun is a small village located in the northern part of Mahalaxmi Municipality at Dhankuta district in the Province No. 1 of eastern Nepal. At the time of the 1991 Nepal census it had a population of 1838 people living in 924 individual households. But latest survey which hold by village it has more than 2500 population.
