= Buddhikarna Rai =

Buddhikarna Rai (बुद्धिकर्ण राय), also written Buddhikarna Raya, was the Dewan (chief minister) and the de facto political leader of the Sen Kingdom of Bijayapur–Morang during the late eighteenth century.

== Historical records ==
Historical records show that while Karna Sen remained the nominal king, Buddhikarna Rai exercised the kingdom's executive authority. The Regmi Research Series, based on archival documents, records that King Prithvi Narayan Shah referred to "Dewan Buddhikarna" in letters written during the Gorkhali campaign against Bijayapur in VS 1831 (1774 CE). These records state that Buddhikarna administered Bijayapur on behalf of King Karna Sen and later fled with the king to Sikkim after the Gorkhali conquest.

Sen-period syāhamohars (official seals) further confirm Buddhikarna Rai's authority. Archaeological and historical studies report seals issued in his name from Bijayapur in VS 1824 (1767 CE) and VS 1829 (1772 CE), demonstrating that he exercised official administrative powers, issued state documents, and governed the kingdom during periods when King Kamadatta Sen was absent or after his death.

Historical records also indicate that Buddhikarna Rai succeeded earlier Dewans such as Sirikanta Rai and Jaskarna Rai, continuing a line of powerful Rai ministers in the Sen administration. Some later Yakkha genealogies identify him as an ancestor of the Putlunghang Dewans, while certain Limbu genealogies also claim descent from him. However, surviving eighteenth-century government documents do not explicitly identify his ethnic community. Historians therefore regard his office as securely documented, while his ethnicity remains uncertain.
