= Lohorung language =

Sino-Tibetan language of Nepal

Lohorung
- Loharung
- Native to: Nepal
- Region: Koshi Zone
- Ethnicity: Lohorung
- Native speakers: 6,200 with Southern Yamphu (2011)
- Language family: Sino-Tibetan: Tibeto-Burman; Mahakiranti (?); Kiranti; Eastern; Upper Arun; Lohorung

Language codes
- ISO 639-3: Either: lbr – Northern lrr – Southern
- Glottolog: nort2727 Northern sout2734 Southern
- ELP: Northern Lorung; Southern Yamphu

Lohorung, also spelled Lorung, Lohrung or Loharung, is a Kirati language of eastern Nepal. It has been described by George van Driem.

Southern Lorung is also considered to be Southern Yamphu language. These varieties are all closely related.

== Geographical distribution ==
Lohorung is spoken between the middle Arun valley and the Sabhakhola in central Sankhuwasabha District, Kosi Zone, in the villages of Pangma, Angala, Higuwa, Khorande, Bardeu, Gairiaula, Malta, Sitalpati, and Dhupu (Ethnologue).

Southern Yamphu (Southern Lohorung) is spoken in Bodhe, Mounabudhuk, Bhedetar, and Rajaran villages in Dhankuta District, Kosi Zone (Ethnologue). It is also spoken in Devitar and Matsya Pokhari villages, northern Sankhuwasabha District, which are located south of the Tamorkhola, east of the Jaruwakhola and west of the Raghuwkhola. Dialects are Gessa and Yamphe (also known as Newahang Yamphe, Yakkhaba, Yakkhaba Khap, Yamphe Kha).
