= Chintang Devi temple =

Temple in Nepal

- Nepali: छिन्ताङ जालपा देवी(ठिगुमहाङमा)
- Location in Nepal

Religion
- Affiliation: Hinduism
- District: Dhankuta District

Location
- Country: Nepal
- Interactive map of Chintang Devi temple
- Coordinates: 26.9550°N 87.2041°E

Chintang Devi temple (Nepali:छिन्ताङ देवी),(Rai ठिगुमहाङमा) is a Kirati and Hindu temple located in Dhankuta, Nepal. The temple is en route to the ancient pilgrimage site of Barahakshetra at the confluence of the Saptakoshi River. The temple is also known by the name of Jalpadevi Temple. The temple derives its name from Chintang, one of the seven daughter of Budhahang. Any women after mensuration (generally 10 years or older) are not allowed to enter the temple.

A festival is organized in the full moon of Baisakh in the temple.

A kirat priest looks after the temple.
