= Chanuwa =

Chanuwa चानुवा
- Village development committee
- Location in Nepal
- Coordinates: 27.17°N 87.30°E
- Country: Nepal
- Zone: Kosi Zone
- District: Dhankuta District

Population (1991)
  - Total: 3,462
- Time zone: UTC+5:45 (Nepal Time)

Chanuwa is a village development committee in Dhankuta District in the Kosi Zone of eastern Nepal. At the time of the 1991 Nepal census it had a population of 3462 people living in 622 individual households.
