= Khoku =

Khoku खोकु
- Village development committee
- Location in Nepal
- Coordinates: 26.99°N 87.21°E
- Country: Nepal
- Province: Province No. 1
- District: Dhankuta District

Population (1991)
  - Total: 3,892
- Time zone: UTC+5:45 (Nepal Time)

Khoku is a village development committee in Shahidbhumi Rural Municipality in the Dhankuta District of Province No. 1 in eastern Nepal. At the time of the 1991 Nepal census it had a population of 3892 people living in 699 individual households.
