= Bhedetar =

Bhedetar भेडेटार
- Hill station
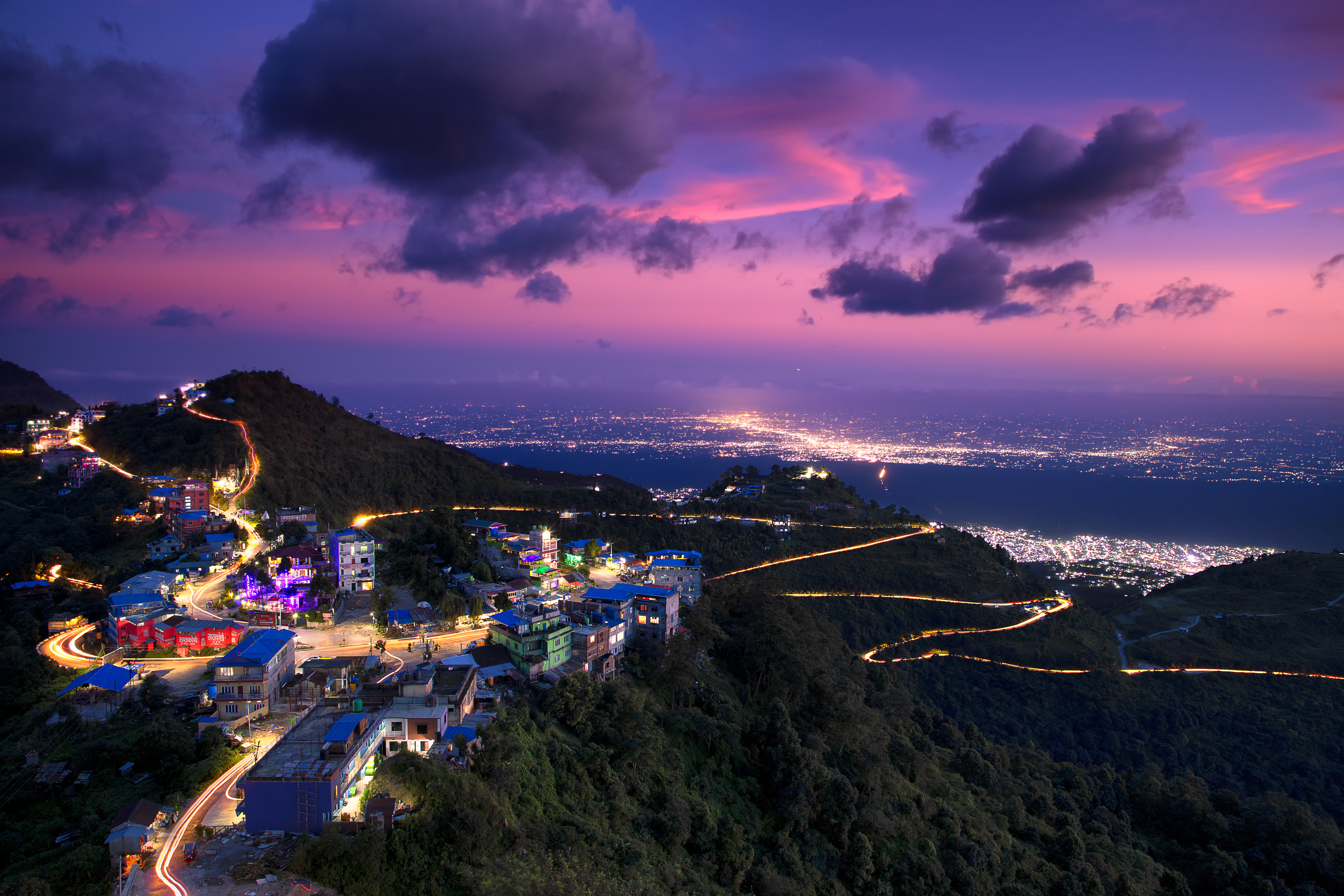
- Evening view of Bhedetar, the hill station of Nepal

- Location in Nepal
- Coordinates: 26°53′0″N 87°20′0″E
- Country: Nepal
- Province: Koshi Province
- District: Dhankuta
- Area: Sangurigadhi
- Elevation: 1,420 m (4,660 ft)

Population (2011)
  - Total: 2,977
- Time zone: UTC+5:45 (NST)
- Postal code: 56804
- Area code: 026
- Nearest city: Dharan

Bhedetar (translation: Sheep's Butte) is a village development committee in Dhankuta District in the Koshi Province of eastern Nepal. The main settlement began when the Dharan - Dhankuta Highway was completed in 1982. At the time of the 1991 Nepal census it had a population of 2643 people living in 513 individual households. It is 1,420 meters above sea level. The village is on the border of Sunsari and Dhankuta districts.

== Attractions ==
Bhedetar is a developing tourist spot. It is a small hill station just 16 kilometers from Dharan Sub-metropolis. It is also known as a transit point to the Namaste Falls.

Nepal Television has a high power transmitter station at Bhedetar which broadcasts different channels. Transmissions are not only received in Bhedetar but also neighbouring places.

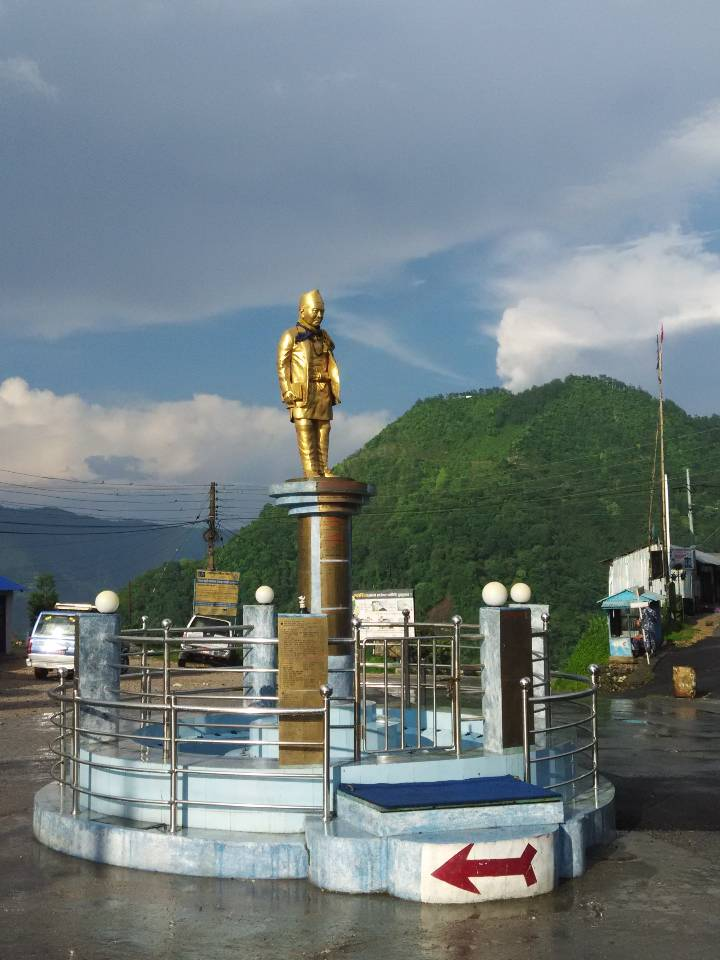
Statue of Iman Xin Chemjong (ᤀᤡᤔᤠᤏ ᤛᤡᤲᤜ ᤆᤣᤶᤈᤥᤅ ᤗᤡᤶᤒᤢ) at Bhedetaar
