= Danda Bazar =

Village development committee in Kosi Zone, Nepal

Danda Bazar डाँडाबजार
- Village development committee
- Location in Nepal
- Coordinates: 26.87°N 87.40°E
- Country: Nepal
- Zone: Kosi Zone
- District: Dhankuta District

Population (1991)
  - Total: 2,476
- Time zone: UTC+5:45 (Nepal Time)
- Postal code: 56803
- Area code: 026

Danda Bazar is a village development committee in Dhankuta District in the Kosi Zone of eastern Nepal. At the time of the 1991 Nepal census it had a population of 2476 people living in 508 individual households.
