= Mahabharat, Dhankuta =

Mahabharat महाभारत
- Village development committee
- Location in Nepal
- Coordinates: 26.90°N 87.28°E
- Country: Nepal
- Zone: Kosi Zone
- District: Dhankuta District

Population (1991)
  - Total: 3,633
- Time zone: UTC+5:45 (Nepal Time)

Mahabharat is a village development committee in Dhankuta District in the Kosi Zone of eastern Nepal. At the time of the 1991 Nepal census it had a population of 3633 people living in 683 individual households.
