= Mudebas =

Mudebas मुढेबास
- Village development committee
- Location in Nepal
- Coordinates: 26.90°N 87.52°E
- Country: Nepal
- Zone: Kosi Zone
- District: Dhankuta District

Population (1991)
  - Total: 2,636
- Time zone: UTC+5:45 (Nepal Time)
- Postal code: 56801
- Area code: 026

Mudebas is a village development committee in Dhankuta District in the Kosi Zone of eastern Nepal. At the time of the 1991 Nepal census it had a population of 2636 people living in 503 individual households.
