= Kuruletenupa =

Coordinates: 26°55′N 87°30′E

Kuruletenupa कुरुलेतेनुपा
- Village development committee
- Interactive map of Kuruletenupa
- Country: Nepal
- Zone: Kosi Zone
- District: Dhankuta District

Population (1991)
  - Total: 4,436
- Time zone: UTC+5:45 (Nepal Time)

Kuruletenupa is a village development committee in Dhankuta District in the Kosi Zone of eastern Nepal. At the time of the 1991 Nepal census it had a population of 4436 people living in 797 individual households.
