= Ankhisalla =

Ankhisalla आँखिसल्ला
- Village development committee
- Location in Nepal
- Coordinates: 26.95°N 87.26°E
- Country: Nepal
- Province: Province No. 1
- District: Dhankuta District

Population (1991)
  - Total: 5,220
- Time zone: UTC+5:45 (Nepal Time)
- Postal code: 56805
- Area code: 026

Ankhisalla is a village development committee in the Shahidbhumi Rural Municipality of Dhankuta District in the Province No. 1 of eastern Nepal. At the 1991 Nepal census, it had a population of 5,220 people living in 923 individual households. Chulung is the main language spoken in Ankhisalla.
