= Marek Katahare =

Marek Katahare मारेककटहरे
- Village development committee
- Location in Nepal
- Coordinates: 27.14°N 87.36°E
- Country: Nepal
- Zone: Kosi Zone
- District: Dhankuta District

Population (1991)
  - Total: 5,725
- Time zone: UTC+5:45 (Nepal Time)
- Postal code: 56811
- Area code: 026

Marek Katahare is a village development committee in Dhankuta District in the Kosi Zone of eastern Nepal. At the time of the 1991 Nepal census it had a population of 5725 people living in 983 individual households.
