= Tankhuwa =

Tankhuwa ताँखुवा
- Village development committee
- Location in Nepal
- Coordinates: 27.00°N 87.39°E
- Country: Nepal
- Zone: Kosi Zone
- District: Dhankuta District

Population (1991)
  - Total: 4,163
- Time zone: UTC+5:45 (Nepal Time)

Tankhuwa is a village development committee in Dhankuta District in the Kosi Zone of eastern Nepal. At the time of the 1991 Nepal census it had a population of 4163 people living in 761 individual households.
