= Telia, Nepal =

Telia तेलिया
- Village development committee
- Location in Nepal
- Coordinates: 26.99°N 87.42°E
- Country: Nepal
- Zone: Kosi Zone
- District: Dhankuta District

Population (1991)
  - Total: 2,292
- Time zone: UTC+5:45 (Nepal Time)

Telia is a village development committee in Dhankuta District in the Kosi Zone of eastern Nepal. At the time of the 1991 Nepal census it had a population of 2292 people living in 495 individual households.
