= Maunabudhuk =

Coordinates: 26°54′N 87°27′E

Mauna Budhuk मौंना बुधुक
- Village development committee
- Interactive map of Mauna Budhuk
- Country: Nepal
- Zone: Kosi Zone
- District: Dhankuta District

Government
  - ward adhakshya: Durga Prasad Subedi
  - Mayor(Khanzendra Rai): Shachip( Durga Prasad Chemjong)

Population (1991)
  - Total: 2,372
- Time zone: UTC+5:45 (Nepal Time)
- Postal code: 56800

Mauna budhuk is a village development committee in Dhankuta District in the Kosi Zone of eastern Nepal. At the time of the 1991 Nepal census it had a population of 2372 people living in 440 individual households.
