= Parewadin =

Parewadin परेवादिन
- Village development committee
- Location in Nepal
- Coordinates: 27.06°N 87.40°E
- Country: Nepal
- Zone: Kosi Zone
- District: Dhankuta District

Population (1991)
  - Total: 3,875
- Time zone: UTC+5:45 (Nepal Time)

Parewadin is a village development committee in Dhankuta District in the Kosi Zone of eastern Nepal. At the time of the 1991 Nepal census it had a population of 3875 people living in 738 individual households.
