= Belhara =

Belahara बेलहरा Airport zone
- Village development committee
- Location in Nepal
- Coordinates: 26.96°N 87.30°E
- Country: Nepal
- Province: Province No. 1
- District: Dhankuta District

Population (1991)
  - Total: 4,857
- Time zone: UTC+5:45 (Nepal Time)

Belhara is a village development committee in Dhankuta District in the Province No. 1 of eastern Nepal. At the time of the 1991 Nepal census it had a population of 4857 people living in 874 individual households. The center part of it is called Guthitaar Bazzar. The main source of income of this area is tomato, capsicum and orange production.
