= Chhintang =

Village development committee in Kosi Zone, Nepal

Chhintang छिन्ताङ्ग
- Village development committee
- Location in Nepal
- Coordinates: 26.94°N 87.20°E
- Country: Nepal
- Province: Province No. 1
- District: Dhankuta District

Population (1991)
  - Total: 8,071
- Time zone: UTC+5:45 (Nepal Time)

Chhintang is a village in Shahidbhumi Rural Municipality in the Dhankuta District of Province No. 1 in eastern Nepal. At the time of the 1991 Nepal census it had a population of 8071 people living in 1374 individual households. The Chintang language is primarily spoken in Chhintang.

The village was the site of the Chhintang massacre. On January 12, 2018, the Government of Nepal officially declared the 16 people killed in the November 13, 1979 massacre as national martyrs.

== See also ==
Chhintang massacre
