= Khuwaphok =

Khuwaphok खुवाफोक
- rural municipality
- Location in Nepal
- Coordinates: 26.93°N 87.39°E
- Country: Nepal
- Zone: Koshi Zone
- District: Dhankuta District

Population (1991)
  - Total: 2,918
- Time zone: UTC+5:45 (Nepal Time)

Khuwaphok is rural village located in Sangurigadhi Rural Municipality ward no. 3 of Dhankuta District in the Koshi Zone of eastern Nepal. At the time of the 1991 Nepal census it had a population of 2918 people living in 537 individual households.

Khuwaphok borders the eighbouring villages Budhimorang, Dandabazar, Bodhe and headquarter of Dhankuta.
