= Budi Morang =

Village development committee in Kosi Zone, Nepal

Budi Morang बुढी मोरङ
- Village development committee
- Location in Nepal
- Coordinates: 26.91°N 87.34°E
- Country: Nepal
- Zone: Kosi Zone
- District: Dhankuta District

Population (1991)
  - Total: 3,602
- Time zone: UTC+5:45 (Nepal Time)

Budi Morang is a village development committee in Dhankuta District in the Kosi Zone of eastern Nepal. At the time of the 1991 Nepal census it had a population of 3602 people living in 706 individual households.

== Climate ==
Climate data for Budi Morang (Mul Ghat), elevation 365 m (1,198 ft)
Month	Jan	Feb	Mar	Apr	May	Jun	Jul	Aug	Sep	Oct	Nov	Dec	Year
Mean daily maximum °C (°F)	22.1 (71.8)	24.9 (76.8)	30.1 (86.2)	33.5 (92.3)	33.2 (91.8)	33.1 (91.6)	31.6 (88.9)	31.5 (88.7)	31.1 (88.0)	30.5 (86.9)	27.4 (81.3)	23.3 (73.9)	29.4 (84.9)
Mean daily minimum °C (°F)	9.7 (49.5)	10.9 (51.6)	15.0 (59.0)	19.0 (66.2)	21.7 (71.1)	24.0 (75.2)	24.1 (75.4)	23.9 (75.0)	22.8 (73.0)	20.1 (68.2)	14.2 (57.6)	10.0 (50.0)	18.0 (64.3)
Average precipitation mm (inches)	10.5 (0.41)	12.8 (0.50)	24.6 (0.97)	48.3 (1.90)	114.5 (4.51)	178.4 (7.02)	295.2 (11.62)	191.7 (7.55)	137.0 (5.39)	51.2 (2.02)	10.6 (0.42)	6.3 (0.25)	1,081.1 (42.56)
Source 1: Australian National University
Source 2: Japan International Cooperation Agency (precipitation)
