= Phaksib =

Phaksib फाक्सिव
- Village development committee
- Location in Nepal
- Coordinates: 26.89°N 87.36°E
- Country: Nepal
- Zone: Kosi Zone
- District: Dhankuta District

Government

Population (1991)
  - Total: 1,827
- Time zone: UTC+5:45 (Nepal Time)
- Postal code: 56803
- Area code: 026

Phaksib is a village development committee in Dhankuta District in the Kosi Zone of eastern Nepal. At the time of the 1991 Nepal census it had a population of 1827 people living in 350 individual households.
