= Basantatar =

Basantatar बसन्तटार
- Village development committee
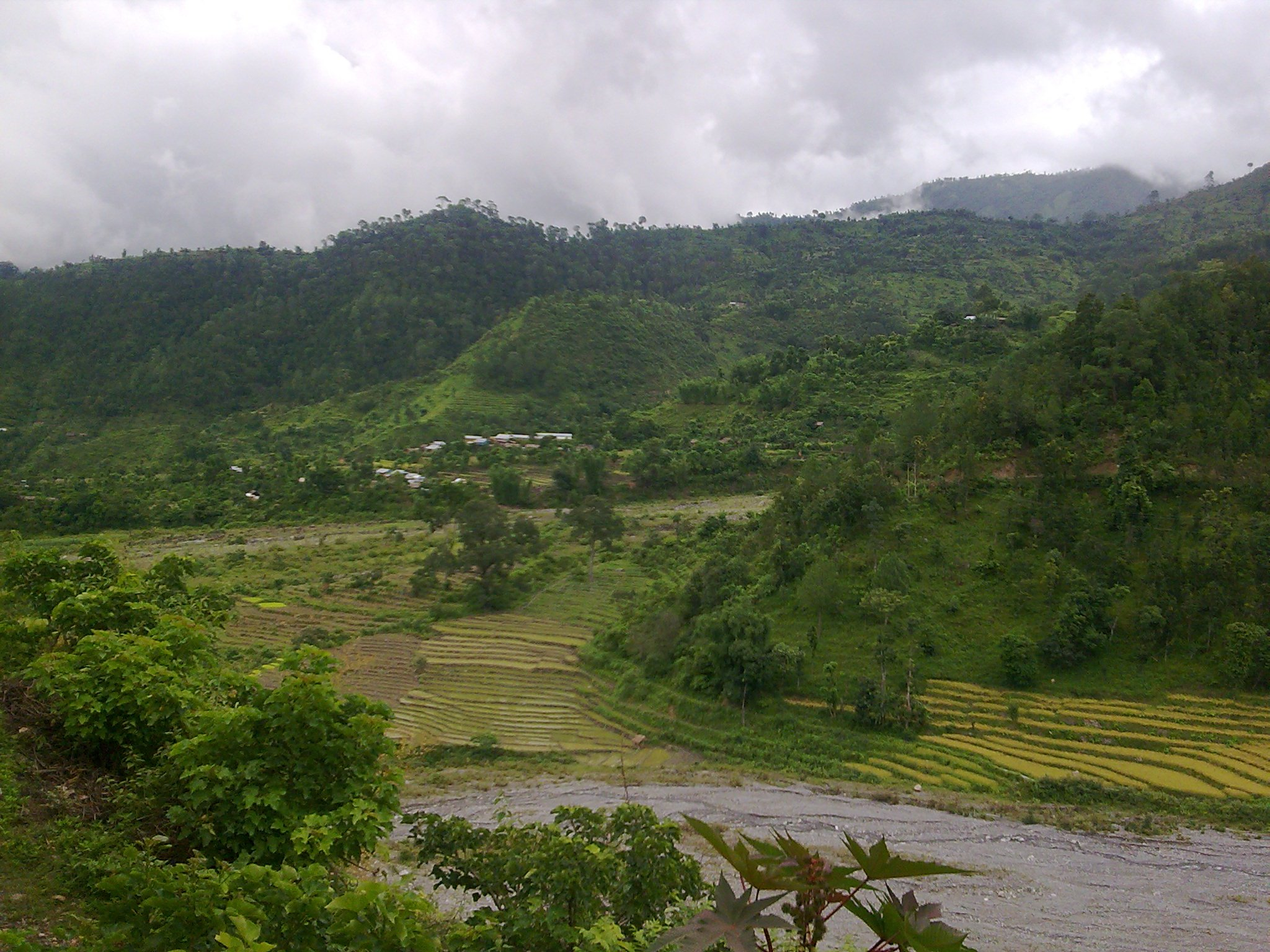

- Location in Nepal
- Coordinates: 26.89°N 87.48°E
- Country: Nepal
- Zone: Kosi Zone
- District: Dhankuta District

Population (1991)
  - Total: 2,638
- Time zone: UTC+5:45 (Nepal Time)

Basantatar is a village development committee in Dhankuta District in the Kosi Zone of eastern Nepal. At the time of the 1991 Nepal census it had a population of 2638 people living in 505 individual households.
