= Rajarani, Dhankuta =

Coordinates: 26°52′N 87°27′E

Raja Rani राजारानी
- Village development committee
- Interactive map of Raja Rani
- Country: Nepal
- Zone: Koshi Zone
- District: Dhankuta District

Population (1991)
  - Total: 2,567
- Time zone: UTC+5:45 (Nepal Time)

Raja Rani is a village development committee in Dhankuta District in the Koshi Zone of eastern Nepal. At the time of the 1991 Nepal census it had a population of 2567 people living in 491 individual households.
