= Bhirgaun =

Bhirgaun भिरगाउँ
- Village development committee
- Location in Nepal
- Coordinates: 27.02°N 87.36°E
- Country: Nepal
- Zone: Kosi Zone
- District: Dhankuta District

Population (1991)
  - Total: 4,413
- Time zone: UTC+5:45 (Nepal Time)

Bhirgaun (also spelled Bhirgaon) is a village development committee in Dhankuta District in the Kosi Zone of eastern Nepal. At the time of the 1991 Nepal census it had a population of 4413 people living in 792 individual households.
