= Jitpur Arkhaule =

Jitpur Arkhaule अर्खौँले जितपुर
- Village development committee
- Country: Nepal
- Zone: Kosi Zone
- District: Dhankuta District

Population (1991)
  - Total: 4,245
- Time zone: UTC+5:45 (Nepal Time)
- Postal code: 56805
- Area code: 026

Jitpur Arkhaule is a village development committee in Dhankuta District in the Kosi Zone of eastern Nepal. At the time of the 1991 Nepal census it had a population of 4245 people living in 831 individual households.
