= Phalate =

Phalate फलाटे
- Village development committee
- Location in Nepal
- Coordinates: 27.07°N 87.23°E
- Country: Nepal
- Zone: Kosi Zone
- District: Dhankuta District

Population (1991)
  - Total: 2,656
- Time zone: UTC+5:45 (Nepal Time)

Phalate is a village development committee in Dhankuta District in the Kosi Zone of eastern Nepal. At the time of the 1991 Nepal census it had a population of 2656 people living in 501 individual households.
