= Chulung language =

Kiranti language of Nepal

Chulung
- Chɨlɨng
- Chhûlûng Rûng
- Native to: Nepal
- Region: Koshi Zone
- Ethnicity: 300 Kirat Chulung (Chiling)
- Native speakers: 2,100 (2011 census)
- Language family: Sino-Tibetan: Tibeto-Burman; Mahakiranti (?); Kiranti; Eastern; Greater Yakkha; Chulung

Language codes
- ISO 639-3: cur
- Glottolog: chhu1238
- ELP: Chhulung

Chulung (Chɨlɨng) is a Kiranti language spoken in Ankhisalla VDC, Dhankuta District, Koshi Zone, Nepal.

== Status ==
Chulung speakers also speak Bantawa, but Bantawa people do not speak Chulung.

== Classification ==
Chulung is closest to the Chhintang and Belhare languages.

== Dialects ==
No dialectal variation is reported for Chulung.

== Phonology ==
=== Consonants ===
Chulung consonants
		Labial	Alveolar	Lamino-alveolar	Lamino-palatal	Velar	Glottal
Plosive/ Affricate	voiceless	p	t	ȶ		k	ʔ
Plosive/ Affricate	aspirated	pʰ	tʰ	ȶʰ		kʰ	
Plosive/ Affricate	voiced	b	d	ȡ		ɡ	
Plosive/ Affricate	voiced aspirated	bʱ	dʱ	ȡʱ		gʱ	
Nasal		m	n			ŋ	
Fricative			s				h
Approximant		w			j		
Trill			r				
Lateral			l				

/g/ and /gʱ/ are found in analogous environments.

=== Vowels ===
Chulung has six vowels. Vowel length is not phonemic. Diphthongs are not attested.

	Front	Central	Back
Close	i	ɨ	u
	e		
Open		a	o
