= Ahale =

Place in Nepal

Ahale आहाले
- Village development committee
- Location in Nepal
- Coordinates: 26.89°N 87.21°E
- Country: Nepal
- Zone: Kosi Zone
- District: Dhankuta District

Population (2011)
  - Total: 4,050
- Time zone: UTC+5:45 (Nepal Time)

Ahale is a village development committee in Dhankuta District in the Kosi Zone of eastern Nepal. At the time of the 1991 Nepal census it had a population of 3839 people living in 707 individual households.
