= Arkhaule Jitpur =

Arkhaule Jitpur अर्खौले जितपुर
- Village development committee
- Location in Nepal
- Coordinates: 27.12°N 87.33°E
- Country: Nepal
- Zone: Kosi Zone
- District: Dhankuta District

Population (1991)
  - Total: 4,691
- Time zone: UTC+5:45 (Nepal Time)

Arkhaule Jitpur is a village development committee in Dhankuta District in the Kosi Zone of eastern Nepal. At the time of the 1991 Nepal census it had a population of 4691.
