= Muga, Nepal =

Muga मुगा
- Village development committee
- Location in Nepal
- Coordinates: 27.04°N 87.21°E
- Country: Nepal
- Zone: Kosi Zone
- District: Dhankuta District

Population (1991)
  - Total: 4,101
- Time zone: UTC+5:45 (Nepal Time)
- Postal code: 56807
- Area code: 026

Muga is a village development committee in Dhankuta District in the Kosi Zone of eastern Nepal. At the 1991 Nepal census, it had a population of 4,101 people living in 738 individual households.
