= Leguwa =

Leguwa लेगुवा
- Village development committee
- Location in Nepal
- Coordinates: 27.12°N 87.28°E
- Country: Nepal
- Zone: Kosi Zone
- District: Dhankuta District

Population (1991)
  - Total: 4,206
- Time zone: UTC+5:45 (Nepal Time)
- Postal code: 56810
- Area code: 026

Leguwa is a village development committee in Dhankuta District in the Kosi Zone of eastern Nepal. At the time of the 1991 Nepal census, it had a population of 4,206 people living in 796 individual households.

== Climate ==
Climate data for Leguwa Ghat, elevation 410 m (1,350 ft)
Month	Jan	Feb	Mar	Apr	May	Jun	Jul	Aug	Sep	Oct	Nov	Dec	Year
Mean daily maximum °C (°F)	22.0 (71.6)	25.0 (77.0)	30.4 (86.7)	33.2 (91.8)	33.2 (91.8)	33.5 (92.3)	31.8 (89.2)	31.5 (88.7)	31.2 (88.2)	30.7 (87.3)	27.0 (80.6)	23.1 (73.6)	29.4 (84.9)
Mean daily minimum °C (°F)	10.2 (50.4)	11.3 (52.3)	15.6 (60.1)	19.0 (66.2)	21.3 (70.3)	23.8 (74.8)	24.0 (75.2)	23.8 (74.8)	22.6 (72.7)	19.8 (67.6)	14.4 (57.9)	10.4 (50.7)	18.0 (64.4)
Average precipitation mm (inches)	6.4 (0.25)	8.7 (0.34)	20.0 (0.79)	69.2 (2.72)	122.7 (4.83)	137.0 (5.39)	183.3 (7.22)	165.1 (6.50)	99.8 (3.93)	36.1 (1.42)	9.1 (0.36)	3.2 (0.13)	860.6 (33.88)
Source 1: Australian National University
Source 2: Japan International Cooperation Agency (precipitation)
