= Bodhe, Nepal =

Bodhe बोधे
- Village development committee
- Location in Nepal
- Coordinates: 26.93°N 87.44°E
- Country: Nepal
- Zone: Kosi Zone
- District: Dhankuta District

Population (1991)
  - Total: 3,294
- Time zone: UTC+5:45 (Nepal Time)

Bodhe is a village development committee in Dhankuta District in the Kosi Zone of eastern Nepal. At the time of the 1991 Nepal census it had a population of 3294 people living in 572 individual households.
