= Athpare language =

Eastern Kiranti language of Nepal

Athpare
- Region: Dhankuta District, Nepal
- Ethnicity: Kirat Athpare of Dhankuta and Bhirgaun
- Native speakers: 5,500 (2011 census)
- Language family: Sino-Tibetan: Kiranti; Eastern; Greater Yakkha; Athpare

Language codes
- ISO 639-3: aph
- Glottolog: athp1241
- ELP: Athpariya

Athpare, also known as Athapre, Athpariya, Athpre, Arthare, Arthare-Khesang, or Jamindar, spelled Athpariya I to be distinguished from Belhariya (Athpariya II), is an eastern Kiranti language.

== Locations ==
Athpare is spoken by some 5,000 people living in Dhankuta District in eastern Nepal. The language is spoken to the north of Tamur, to the west of Dhankuta khola, and to the east of Tangkhuwa, and is also spoken in Dhankuta municipality and Bhirgau VDC.

== Phonology ==
=== Consonants ===
The consonants are shown in the table below. Voiced consonants are rare in the initial position. In the medial position of verbs, voiced consonants are conditioned variants. Aspiration is phonemic in initial position. There are no fricatives except for [s] and [h].

		Labial	Alveolar	Palatal	Velar	Glottal
Plosive/ Affricate	voiceless	p	t	tʃ	k	ʔ
Plosive/ Affricate	aspirated	pʰ	tʰ	tʃʰ	kʰ	
Plosive/ Affricate	voiced	b	d	dʒ	ɡ	
Plosive/ Affricate	voiced aspirated	bʱ	dʱ	dʒʱ		
Fricative			s			h
Nasal		m	n		ŋ	
Approximant	central	w		j		
Approximant	lateral		l			
Trill	voiced		r			
Trill	aspirated		rʱ			

Geminated consonants are found in verbs with stem-final [tt] and as the result of assimilation to the infinitival suffix (e.g., -ma: pap(t)- + ma -> pamma ‘to scratch’).

=== Vowels ===
There are five vowels in Athpare: /i, e, a, o, u/. Vowels are somewhat lengthened in open root syllables, but this feature is likely allophonic. Diphthongs are marginal in Athpare—ai, oi and ui have been shown to exist but in very few words.

== Morphology ==
Subject and object person markers are realized partly as prefixes, partly as suffixes. There are separate number suffixes and tense markers, some of them followed by a copy of the person marker. Periphrastic tense-aspects (perfect and progressive) are fully grammaticalized. Athpare is morphologically ergative, with a split between 1st person and the rest. Minimal use is made of non-finite verb forms: Compound verbs consist of two verbs marked for person and tense, subordinators follow inflected verbs.

Athpare has an extremely complex verbal system, with both actor and undergoer being marked on the verb. There are also several types of suffix copying, resulting in the longest suffix chains of any Kiranti language, e.g.,

ni -ni -m -get -n -et -ni -m -ci -m -ma -ga
see -NEG -1/2P.A -v2:attain -NEG -AUX:PT -NEG -1/2P.A -3ns.U -1/2P.A -e -NML:ns
‘we (pe) had not seen them’

=== Word order ===
Athpare is a verb-final language. Topics and sentence adverbials normally have initial position. There is much freedom in rearranging elements according to communicative needs.

Athpare has a number of verbs corresponding to the English ‘to be’:

- wa-, wama (locational)
- yuŋ-, yuŋma (existential)
- lis-, lima (be, become - acquisition)
- is-, ima (be, become - spatial)
- le-na (identification)
- NEG: waina~woina

Participants are coded by pronominal affixes on the verb, and if necessary, by noun phrases. Pronouns are optional and used only if the speaker wants to make the reference more explicit.

The following postpositions serve as case markers:

- /-ŋa/ realized as [-ma], [-na], [-ja], or [-ŋa] oblique: ergative; instrumental; genitive; cause
- /-ŋi/ realized as [-mi], [-ni], [-i]~[-e], or [-ŋi] locative (and directive)
- -lam(ma) ablative
- -leŋ directive
- -lok comitative
- -me deprivative

== Grammar ==
Athpare is SOV word order, all modifiers precede their head. It has nine tense-aspect forms: past, non-past, progressive, ambulative (a progressive form where an activity or process is going on while the actor or subject is moving here and there), perfect, negative non-past (negative paradigms don’t directly mirror positive forms), negative past, a generalized negative and a negative past anterior/past progressive form - and two modes: imperative and optative. The two modes are inflected for person, but have no final tense-aspect markers.

Athpre marks natural gender with kinship terms and for larger animals. Gender plays no role in agreement. There are two qualitative classifiers which distinguish human from non-human.

The language has three numbers: singular, dual and plural, and different 1st person inclusive and exclusive pronouns in dual and plural.

Diminutives are formed from animate nouns with the suffix -cilet. There are unique temporal adverbs for two, three and four units of time (days, years, etc.) before and after the present.

== Sources ==
- Dahal, Dilli Ram (1985). An ethnographic study of the social change among the Athpariya Rais of Dhankuta. Kathmandu: Tribhuvan University. OCLC 17410692.
- Ebert, Karen H. (1991). "Inverse and pseudoinverse prefixes in Kiranti languages: Evidence from Belhare, Athpare and Dungmali". Linguistics of the Tibeto-Burman Area. 14 (1): 73–92.
- Ebert, Karen H. (1997). A Grammar of Athpare. LINCOM Studies in Asian Linguistics. Vol. 1. München: Lincom. ISBN 9783895861468.
- Newpane, Tanka Prasad (2014). Dhankutako Athpare Raiko bhasik adhyayan (Thesis). Kirtipur: Tribhuvan University.
