= Chintang language =

Kiranti language spoken in Nepal

Chintang
- छिन्ताङ्
- Pronunciation: [ˈtsʰintaːŋ]
- Region: Dhankuta District, Nepal
- Ethnicity: 5,000 (2011 census?)
- Native speakers: 3,700 (2011 census)
- Language family: Sino-Tibetan: Tibeto-Burman; Mahakiranti (?); Kiranti languages; Eastern Kiranti; Chintang

Language codes
- ISO 639-3: ctn
- Glottolog: chhi1245
- ELP: Chhintange
- Thulung is classified as Severely Endangered by the UNESCO Atlas of the World's Languages in Danger.

Chintang (Chintang: छिन्ताङ् Chintāṅ / Chhintang) is an eastern Kirati language spoken by 5,000 to 6,000 people in Chhintang VDC and Ahale VDC in Dhankuta District, Province No. 1, Nepal. Its closest relatives are Athpare, Belhare, and Chulung. It is divided into two dialects, Sambugāũ and Mulgāũ, of which the former is more influenced by other languages, namely Bantawa, another Kiranti language, and Nepali.

== Classification ==
Chintang is a Kiranti language. The closest languages to Chintang are Athpare, Belhare, and Chulung.

== Geographical distribution ==
Chintang is spoken mainly in two villages, Mulgāũ and Sambugāũ, in Chhintang Village Development Commitee. It is also spoken in Ahale Village Development Commitee.

== Dialects ==
The language has two dialects, Mulgāũ and Sambugāũ, after the areas where they are spoken. Sambugāũ is more influenced by Bantawa, another Kiranti language, and by Nepali.

== Status ==
Most speakers of Chintang are also fluent in the Indo-European Nepali language, which is the lingua franca of Nepal and the sole language of instruction in school, and the Sino-Tibetan Bantawa language, which is closely related to Chintang. The UNESCO World Atlas of Languages classifies the language as definitely endangered; the Atlas of the World's Languages in Danger classified it as Severely Endangered. Most children still learn Chintang as their native language, even though monolingual speakers are elderly, mostly women.

== Phonology ==
=== Consonants ===
27 consonants are found in native Chintang words. The following table excludes phonemes found mainly in loanwords.

		Labial	Alveolar	Postalveolar	Dorsal	Glottal
Nasal		m	n		ŋ	
Plosive/ Affricate	voiceless	p	t	tʃ	k	ʔ
Plosive/ Affricate	voiceless aspirated	pʰ	tʰ	tʃʰ	kʰ	
Plosive/ Affricate	voiced	b	d	dʒ	ɡ	
Plosive/ Affricate	voiced aspirated	bʱ	dʱ	dʒʱ	ɡʱ	
Trill/Flap			r			
Fricative			s			h
Approximant		w	l lʱ	j		

The alveolar consonants /t/, /d/, /tʰ/, /dʱ/, /n/ are apico-postalveolar, while /l, lʱ, r/ are apico-alveolar.

=== Vowels ===
Chintang has six vowels. Vowel length is not phonemic in Chintang.

	front	central	back
high	i	ɨ	u
mid	e		o
low		a	
