= Yakkha people =

Indigenous ethnic group of Limbuwan, Nepal

Yakkha, Dewan
ᤕᤠᤰᤂᤠ याक्खा
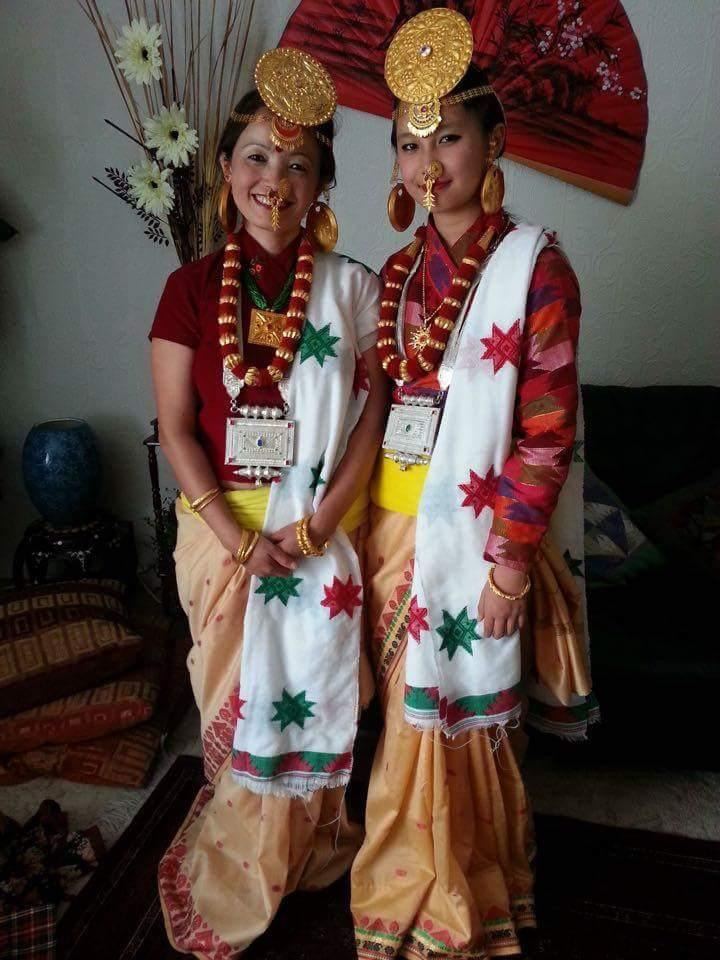
- Yakkha women in traditional dress

Total population
- Nepal 17,460 (2021)
- Sikkim India: 193 (2006)

Languages
- Yakkha language, Nepali

Religion
- Majority: •Kiratism 80% Minority: •Hinduism 20%

Related ethnic groups
- Limbu; Rai; Sunuwar Other Tibeto-Burman-speaking peoples

The Yakkha or Dewan (Nepali याक्खा, Yākkhā) are an indigenous ethnic group from the Indian subcontinent, mainly in modern-day Nepal and present-day India (related to other Kirat groups, like the Limbu, Sunuwar, Rai). It is one of the descendants of Nepal's prehistoric Kirat dynasty. The Yakkha people are subsistence farmers who inhabit the lower Arun valley in eastern Nepal. They number only a few thousand and their language is nearly extinct. They are closely related to Limbu people.

== Etymology ==
Scholars have different opinions regarding the origin of the word Yakkha. One school of thought claims that the ethnonym Yakkha as per the Aryan Sanskrit grammar had been spelled in the Aryan-Hindu mythologies as Yaksa-sh (like Bhisu-shu for an ascetic Bhikchu of the Buddhist holy scripts). Although the legendary Yaksa-sh, by the corrupt name of Yakkha, is mentioned in religious Hindu texts, the Vedas and ancient Sanskrit literature, Yakkha has historically been consistent in the use of its own endonyms. Yakkhawa or Yakkhaba is used to denote the male person and Yakkhama to denote the female person.

== Exonyms ==
The Yakkhas are also known by the exonyms Dewan and Jimi titles they accepted after the conquest of the Kirat land by the Gorkhas under Prithvi Narayan Shah. The Yakkhas were not only given ownership of the land but were also given the responsibility of collecting taxes from the lands utilised by Yakkhas as well as non-Yakkhas living in the area. In Darjeeling district, Kalimpong district and Sikkim of India, Dewan is commonly used as a synonym of Yakkha, and as Dewans they are placed in the Other Backward Class category.

== Yakkha Land (Yākkhālen) ==
Today, the Yakkha Motherland is considered a patch among the historic Kirat region (i.e., east of the Kathmandu valley). During the National Unification of Nepal by Prithvi Narayan Shah, the traditional bases of the Kirat Lands were merged. The Far Kirat (Pallo Kirat) of the Limbuwan area to the east of the Arun River was divided into seventeen Thums. Among these Seventeen Thums, the Panch (5) Khapan, Panch (5) Majhiya and Das (10) Majhiya; Tin Thum Yakkhalen are regarded as the traditional area of the Yakkhas. This Yakkha area is the Southern part of Sankhuwasabha district bordering the Terhathum District and Taplejung District in the East; Dhankuta District in the South; and Bhojpur District in the West; of the Eastern Nepal. Sibhuwa, Syabun, Wana, Dadagau, Swachi, Yangsijong, Wabun, Maidane, Chitlang are the names of Panch-Khapan; Madi Mulkharka, Tamafok, Tellok, Mamgling, Ankhibhuin, Hombong, Marrek, Chanuwa, Dandagaun, etc. are the names of the Dash-Majhiyas and Hattisudhe, Kingring, Chapabhuin, Aambote, Chainpur etc. are the name of Panch-Majhiyas.

== Religion, language and culture ==
The Yakkha’s have a distinct language, culture and tradition. The Yakkha language is a Tibeto-Burman language. The onset of modernism and influence from external factors have caused a rapid disappearance of the Yakkha language. The Yakkhas practice the Kirati religion of nature worship. There are 32 family names (Thar) in the Yakkhas. Each Thar also has a sub-group called the Sameychong. Marriages do not occur between families sharing the same Sameychong.

== Population ==
As per the National Population and Housing Census 2021 of Nepal, the population of Yakkhas in Nepal was 17,460 (0.06% of the total population of Nepal). As per the 2011 Nepal census of Nepal, the population of Yakkhas in Nepal was 24,336 (0.1% of the total population of Nepal). As per the population census of Nepal 2001, there were 17,003 Yakkhas in Nepal. A few thousand Yakkhas live in Darjeeling and Kalimpong districts, Sikkim, North-Eastern states and other parts of India.

As per the 2021 Nepal census, the population of Yakkha people by province is as follows:

- Koshi Province: 16,451
- Madhesh Province: 90
- Bagmati Province: 682
- Gandaki Province: 39
- Lumbini Province: 182
- Karnali Province: 0
- Sudurpashchim Province: 10

As per the 2021 Nepal census, the population of Yakkha people by district is as follows:

- Taplejung: 235
- Sankhuwasabha: 5752
- Dhankuta: 4344
- Terhathum: 180
- Panchthar: 471
- Ilam: 1308
- Jhapa: 672
- Morang: 1698
- Sunsari: 1730
- Udayapur: 47
- Saptari: 12
- Bara: 77
- Nuwakot: 10
- Kathmandu: 367
- Bhaktapur: 29
- Lalitpur: 229
- Kavrepalanchok: 12
- Chitawan: 12
- Gorkha: 11
- Kaski: 11
- Nawalparasi (West): 88
- Rupandehi: 90
