= Dhankuta District =

Coordinates: 26°58′53″N 87°20′36″E

Dhankuta District धनकुटा जिल्ला
- District
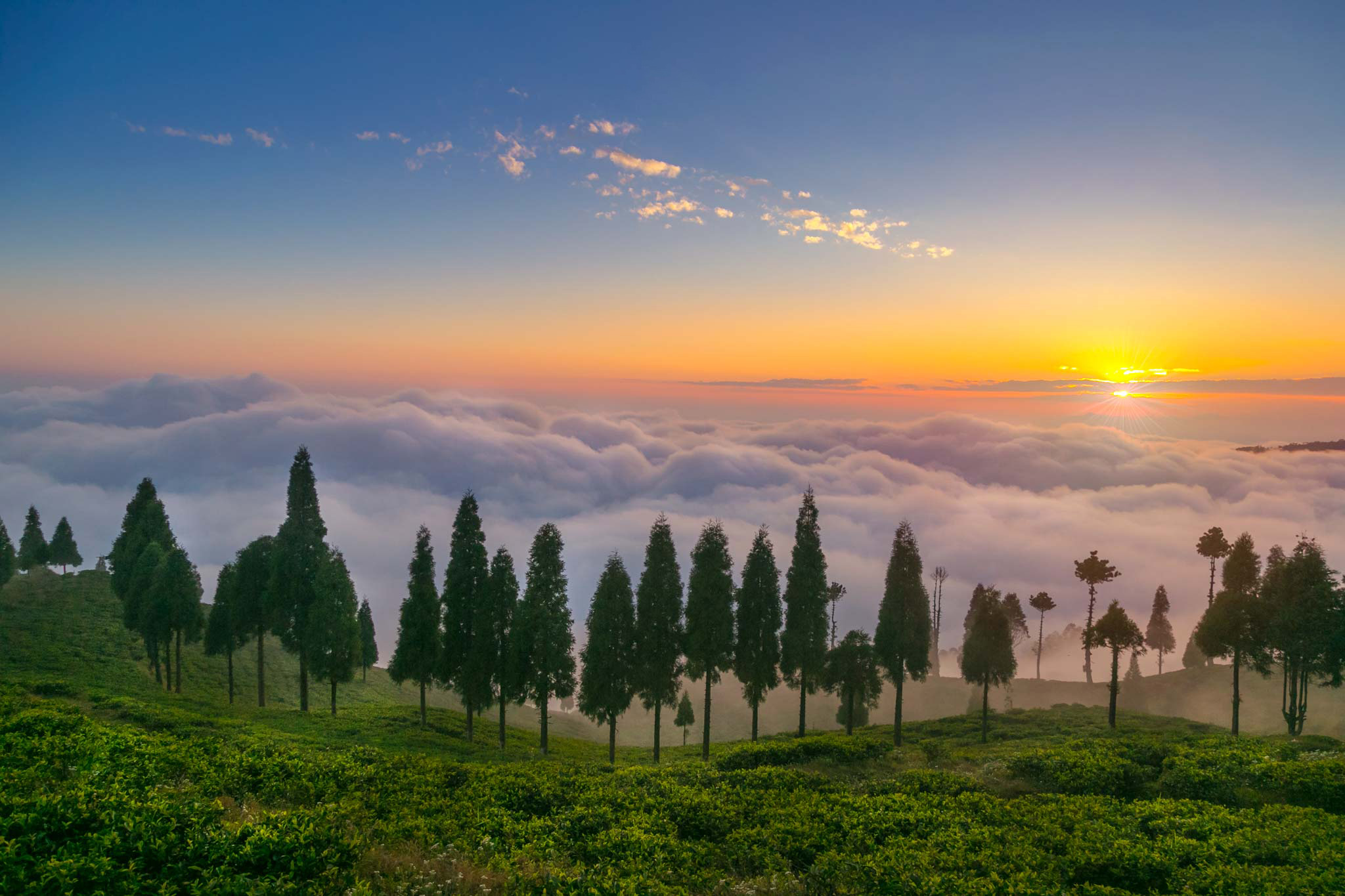
- A scene of sunset from a tea garden at Hile, Dhankuta

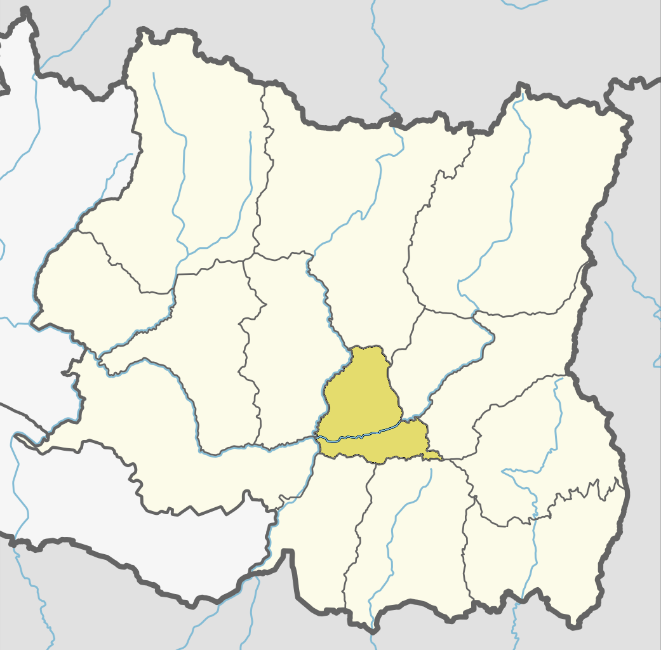
- Location of Dhankuta

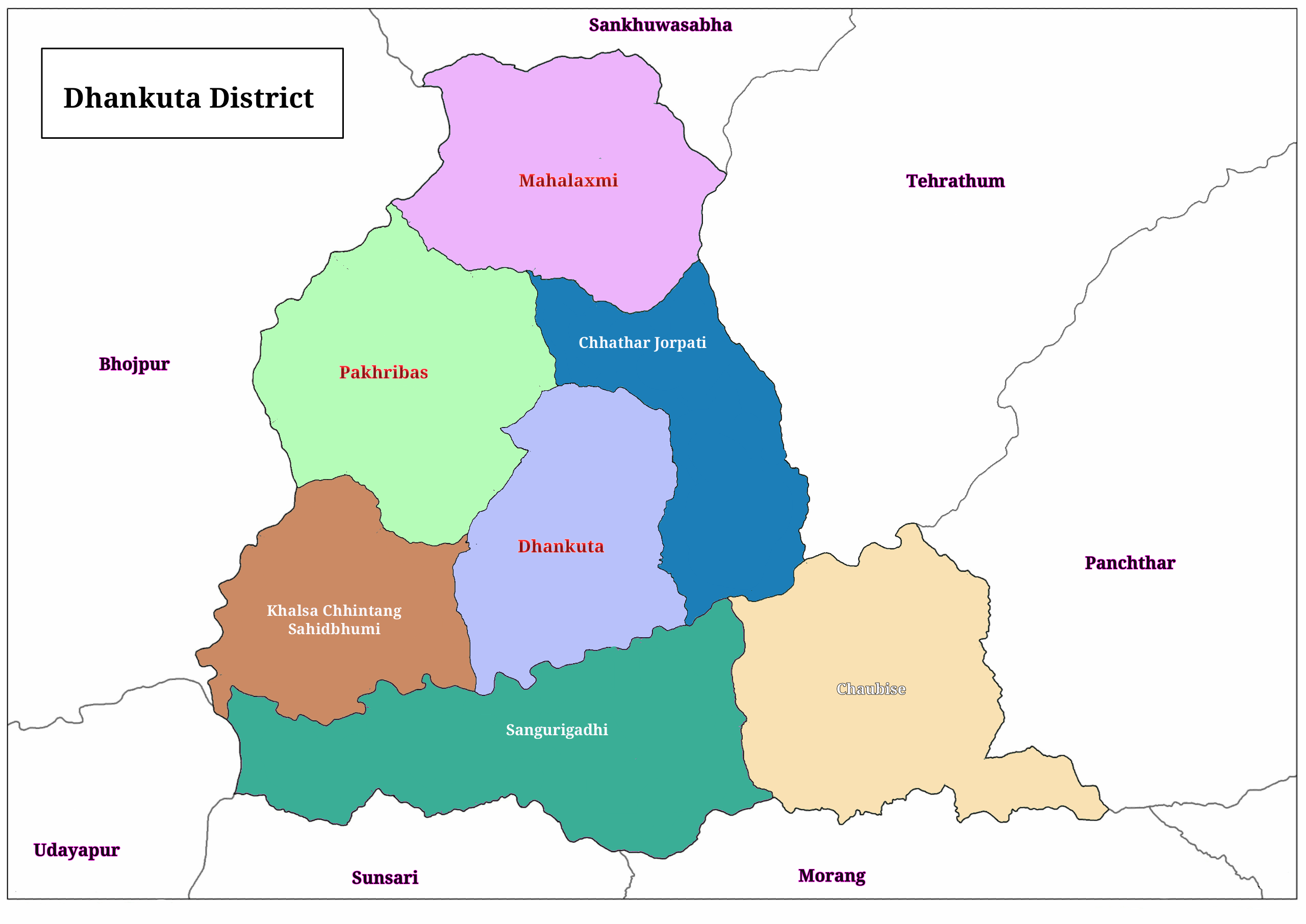
- Divisions of Dhankuta District
- Country: Nepal
- Province: Koshi Province
- Established: during Rana regime
- Reestablished (rearranged): 1962
- Admin HQ.: Dhankuta
- Municipality: List: Urban; Dhankuta; Pakhribas; Mahalaxmi; Rural; Sangurigadhi; Chaubise; Khalsa Chhintang Sahidbhumi; Chhathar Jorpati

Government
  - Type: Coordination committee
  - Body: DCC, Dhankuta

Area
  - Total: 892 km^{2} (344 sq mi)

Population (2021)
  - Total: 163,412
  - Density: 183/km^{2} (474/sq mi)
  - Households: 37,616

Demographics
  - Ethnic groups: 19.9%Rai; 19.7%Chhetri; 13.8%Limbu; 10%Magar; 37%Others
  - Female ♀: 53%

Human Development Index
  - Income per capita (US dollars): $1257
  - Poverty rate: 15.9%
  - Literacy: 74%
  - Life Expectancy: 69
- Time zone: UTC+05:45 (NPT)
- Main Language(s): Nepali, Limbu, Bantawa, Magar
- Website: ddcdhankuta.gov.np

Dhankuta District (Nepali: धनकुटा जिल्ला) is one of 14 districts of Koshi Province of eastern Nepal. The district covers an area of 891 km^{2} (344 sq mi) and has a population (2011) of 163,412. The hill town of Dhankuta serves as the district headquarters of Dhankuta District.

== History ==
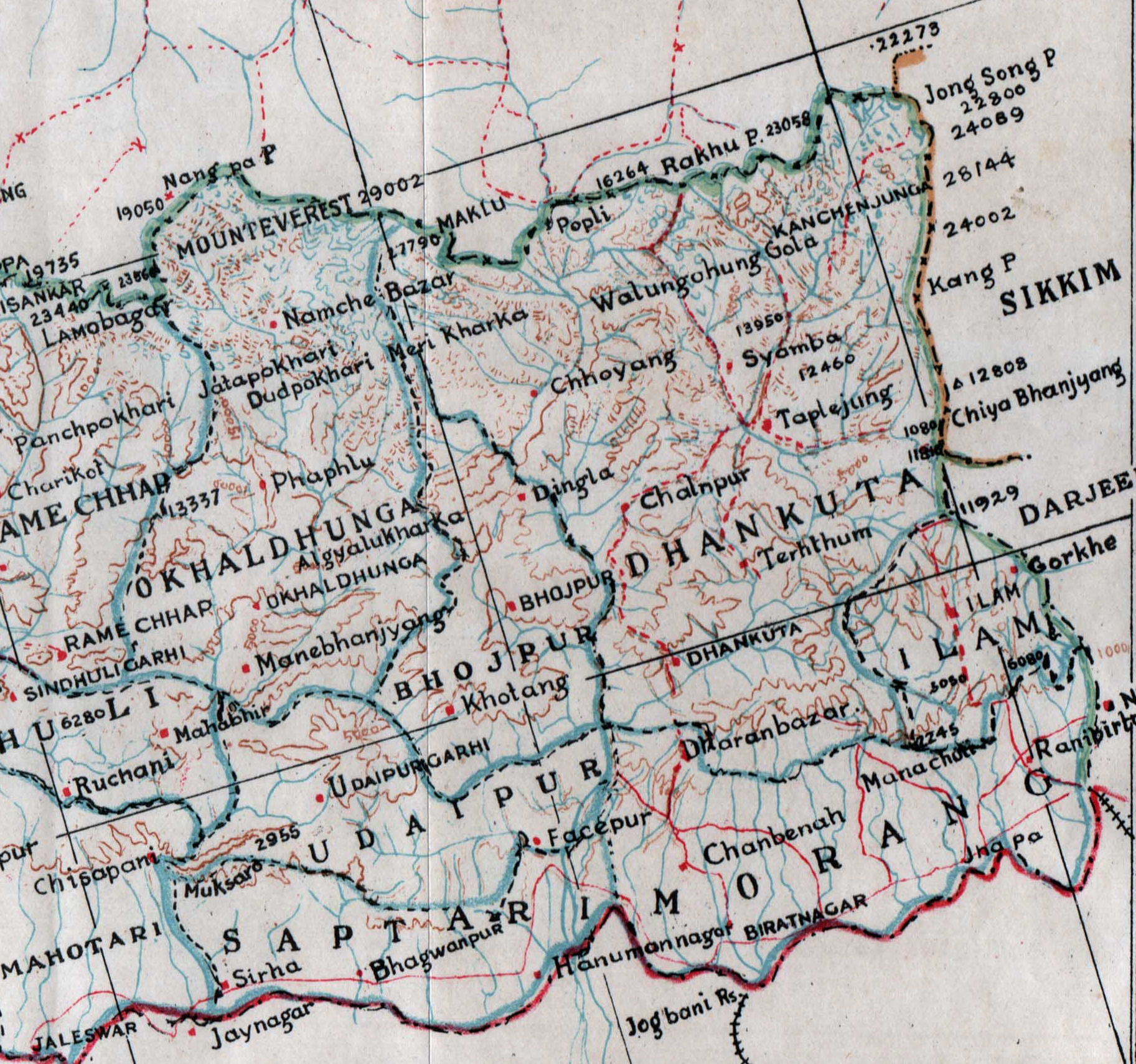
This cropped map of Eastern Nepal (1942) showing large Dhankuta district

Dhankuta is an important historical region of eastern Nepal, closely associated with the wider Kirati cultural and political landscape. Before the expansion of the Gorkha state, the area was divided among various local Kirati communities and chiefs. The Athpahariya Rai, traditionally concentrated around Dhankuta, developed a distinctive culture based on Mundum traditions, ancestral worship, agriculture, clan organization and customary leadership. Athpahariya oral tradition remembers Margahang as an ancestral political territory and preserves traditions of ancient kingship. Another important figure is Kirati King Budhahang, traditionally associated with the Khalsa area of Dhankuta, particularly Ankhisalla–Chhintang. His story is preserved mainly through oral traditions and is connected with resistance to the eastward expansion of the Gorkha kingdom.The eastern hills were also connected with Limbuwan, where Limbu chiefs exercised local authority and defended customary land rights. During Prithvi Narayan Shah's eighteenth-century unification campaign, Gorkha forces incorporated eastern territories through warfare and political negotiations. The 1774 Gorkha–Limbuwan agreement is particularly important for the continuation of Limbu customary rights, including Kipat.

After 1816 there were 10 districts in Nepal and Dhankuta-Chainpur district was one of them. All land from east of Dudhkosi river to the Mechi River was one district Dhankuta-Chainpur.

From 1885 to 1962 Nepal remained divided into 32 districts, including six districts in the eastern-hill region: East No. 1, East No. 2, East No. 3, East No. 4, Ilam and Dhankuta. Dhankuta was center of these districts. That time also Dhankuta was a large (by area) district. Current Sankhuwasabha, Tehrathum, Taplejung, Panchthar and Dhankuta districts were incorporated under one district. The total area of the former Dhankuta district was 3,448 square miles (8,930 km^{2}).

In 1962, Nepal divided into 75 districts and 16 districts of eastern Nepal grouped to form Eastern Development Region and Dhankuta became its headquarter.

== Geography and climate ==
Dhankuta is a mid-hill district of eastern hill region of Nepal. It is situated between 26°53' to 27°19' north latitude and 87°8' to 88°33' east longitude. Total area of the district is 888.7 square kilometres (343.1 mi^{2}) and it is located at 243 metres (9,600 in) to 629 metres (24,800 in) of elevation above sea level.

=== Vegetation ===
The vegetation zones in the district range from sub-tropical Sal forest along the Tamor and Arun rivers, and cooler temperate forests on some of the high ridges that mark the watershed between the two catchments. The altitude ranges from around 300m to 2500m. The majority of the population are involved in agriculture and crops include maize, rice and millet. Important cash crops include citrus fruits, cauliflower, cabbage, ginger, and in recent years, tea. A well-preserved forest (Rani Ban – Queen's Forest) spreads along a ridge line on the northwest side of the village, with well-developed mature stands of rhododendron and sallo (pine) trees.

Climate Zone	Elevation Range	% of Area
Lower Tropical	below 300 meters (1,000 ft)	3.7%
Upper Tropical	300 to 1,000 meters 1,000 to 3,300 ft.	44.7%
Subtropical	1,000 to 2,000 meters 3,300 to 6,600 ft.	46.6%
Temperate	2,000 to 3,000 meters 6,400 to 9,800 ft.	3.2%

== Demographics ==
Historical population
Year	Pop.	±% p.a.
1981	129,781	—
1991	146,386	+1.21%
2001	166,479	+1.29%
2011	163,412	−0.19%
2021	150,599	−0.81%

At the time of the 2021 Nepal census, Dhankuta District had a population of 150,599. It has a literacy rate of 73.9% and a sex ratio of 1040 females per 1000 males. 27,351 (19.41%) lived in municipalities.

Ethnicity/caste of Dhankuta district (2021)
1. Rai (19.9%)
2. Chhetri (19.7%)
3. Limbu (13.8%)
4. Magar (10.3%)
5. Tamang (6.56%)
6. Newar (4.48%)
7. Bahun (4.09%)
8. Kami (caste) (3.65%)
9. Yakkha (2.88%)
10. Other Hill Janjati (5.47%)
11. Other Khas Dalit (3.56%)
12. Others (1.92%)

Ethnicity/caste: 19.9% Rai,19.7% Chhetri, 13.85% Limbu, 10.35% Magar, 6.56% Tamang, 4.48% Newar, 4.09% Bahun, 3.65% Kami, 2.88% Yakkha, 2.14% Damai, 1.42% Sarki, 1.39% Gurung and 1.08% Bhujel.

Religion in Dhankuta District (2021)
Religion	Percent
Hinduism	49.56%
Kirat Mundhum	34.74%
Buddhism	13.11%
Christianity	2.47%
Other or not stated	0.12%

Religion: 49.56% were Hindu, 34.74% Kirati, 13.11% Buddhist and 2.47% Christian.

Languages of Dhankuta district (2021)
1. Nepali (45.4%)
2. Limbu (13.0%)
3. Bantawa (9.85%)
4. Magar Dhut (9.28%)
5. Tamang (5.28%)
6. Athpahariya (3.40%)
7. Rai (3.09%)
8. Yakkha (2.54%)
9. Chhintang (1.61%)
10. Newari (1.39%)
11. Others (5.14%)

As their first language, 45.44% of the population spoke Nepali, 12.98% Limbu, 9.85% Bantawa, 9.28% Magar Dhut, 5.28% Tamang, 3.40% Athpahariya, 3.09% Rai, 2.54% Yakkha, 1.61% Chhintang and 1.39% Newari. In 2011, 43.47% of the population spoke Nepali as their first language.

== Divisions ==
Dhankuta is divided into 3 urban municipalities and 4 rural municipalities.

No.	Type	Name	Nepali	Population (2011)	Area	Website
1	Urban	Dhankuta	धनकुटा	36,619	111	www.dhankutamun.gov.np
2	Urban	Pakhribas	पाख्रीबास	22078	144.29	www.pakhribasmun.gov.np
3	Urban	Mahalaxmi	महालक्ष्मी	24,800	129	www.mahalaxmimundhankuta.gov.np
4	Rural	Sangurigadhi	सागुरीगढी	21,536	147.6	www.sangurigadhimun.gov.np
5	Rural	Chaubise	चौविसे	19,283	147.6	www.choubisemun.gov.np
6	Rural	Shahidbhumi	सहीदभूमि	18,760	99.55	www.choubisemun.gov.np
7	Rural	Chhathar Jorpati	छथर जोरपाटी	18,322	102.83	www.choubisemun.gov.np
	District	Dhankuta	धनकुटा	163,412	892	www.ddcdhankuta.gov.np

=== Former divisions ===
Formerly Dhankuta was divided into 2 municipalities and many Village development committees.

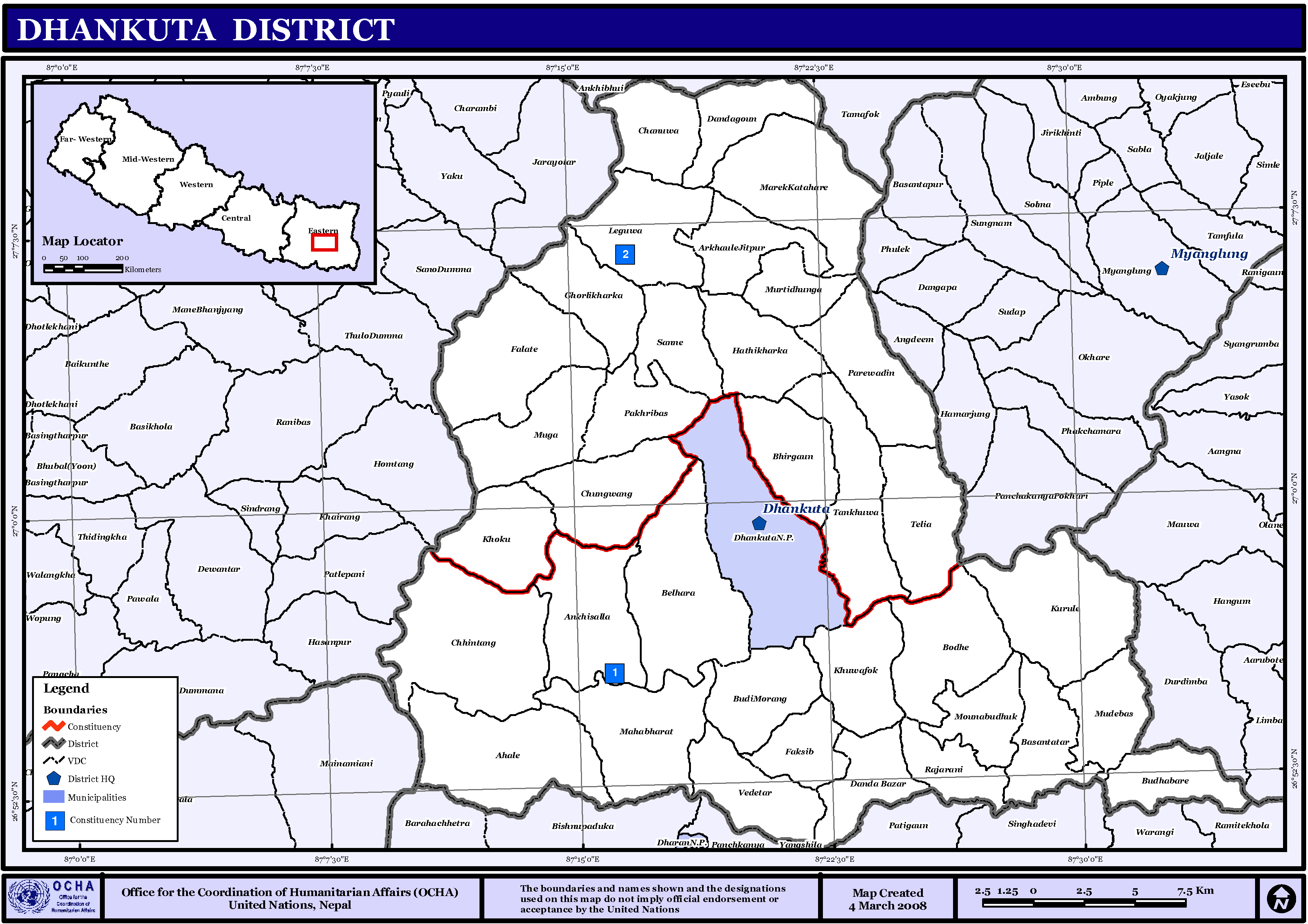
Map of the VDC/s in Dhankuta District

- Dhankuta Municipality
- Ahale
- Ankhisalla
- Arkhaule Jitpur
- Basantatar
- Belahara
- Bhirgaun
- Bodhe
- Budhabare
- Budi Morang
- Chanuwa
- Chhintang
- Chungmang
- Danda Bazar
- Dandagaun
- Ghorlikharka (now Pakhribas Municipality)
- Hattikharka
- Jitpur Arkhaule
- Khoku
- Khuwaphok
- Kuruletenupa
- Leguwa
- Mahabharat
- Marek Katahare
- Maunabudhuk
- Mudebas
- Muga (now Pakhribas Municipality)
- Murtidhunga
- Pakhribas (now Pakhribas Municipality)
- Pakhribas Municipality
- Parewadin
- Phaksib
- Phalate (now Pakhribas Municipality)
- Raja Rani
- Sanne (now Pakhribas Municipality)
- Tankhuwa
- Telia
- Vedatar

== Constituencies ==
Dhankuta District has a single Parliamentary constituency and 2 Provincial constituencies:

Name of cons.	Incorporated areas	Type of cons.	MP/MLA	Party
Dhankuta 1	Whole district	Parliamentary	Rajendra Kumar Rai	UML
Dhankuta 1(A)	Chaubise, Sangurigadhi, Dhankuta (excluding ward no. 2), Khalsa Chhintang Sahidbhumi (excluding ward no. 4 & 5)	Provincial	Niran Rai	UML
Dhankuta 1(B)	Chhathar Jorpati, Pakhribas, Mahalaxmi and ward No. 2 of Dhankuta and ward no. 4 & 5 of Khalsa Chhintang Sahidbhumi	Provincial	Indra Mani Parajuli	UML

== Transportation ==
Kosi Highway

Dhankuta, the headquarter (center) of Dhankuta District is connected with NH-08 (Koshi Highway), which connects Dhankuta with NH-01 (East-west Highway) at Itahari. Itahari is 69 km (43 mi) at distance from Dhankuta. The NH-08 also connects Dhankuta to northern hill and mountainous area.

== Tourist areas ==
- Hile
- Pakhribas
- Bhedetar
- Namaste Waterfall
- Chintang Devi temple

== See also ==
- Zones of Nepal
