= Bantawa language =

Kiranti language spoken in Nepal

Bantawa
- बान्तावा
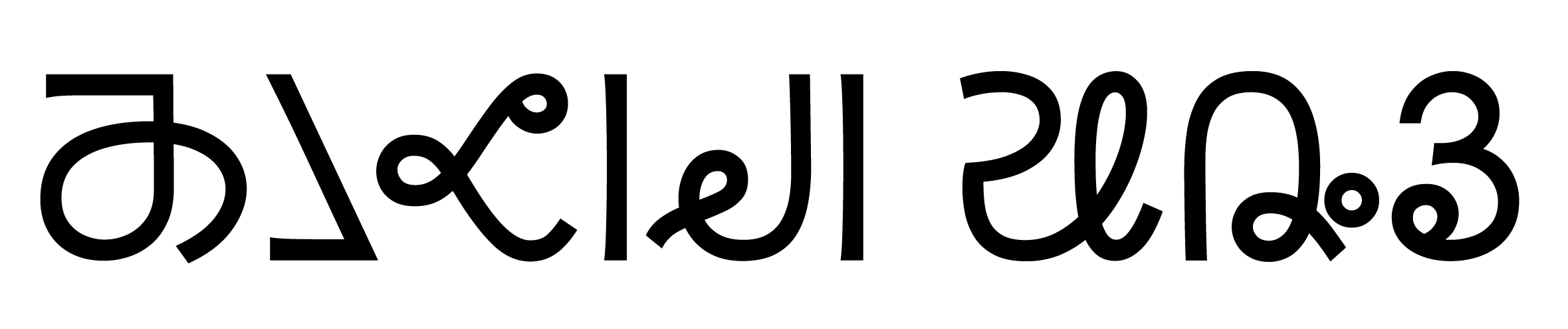
- (top) "Kirawa Yüng" written in Kirat Rai script (bottom) "Bantawa" written in Devanagari script
- Region: Nepal, and Sikkim, Darjeeling, Kalimpong in India
- Ethnicity: Bantawa Kirawa (natively)
- Native speakers: (170,000 cited 2001 & 2011 censuses)
- Language family: Sino-Tibetan: Tibeto-Burman; Mahakiranti (?); Kiranti; Central; Southern; Bantawa
- Writing system: Kirat Rai; Devanagari

Official status
- Official language in: Nepal; Koshi Province (additional); India; Sikkim

Language codes
- ISO 639-3: bap – inclusive code Individual code: wly – Waling
- Glottolog: bant1280
- ELP: Bantawa
- Bantawa is classified as Vulnerable by the UNESCO Atlas of the World's Languages in Danger.

The Bantawa language (also referred to as An Yüng, Bantaba, Bantawa Dum, Bantawa Yong, Bantawa Yüng, Bontawa, Kirawa Yüng) is a Kiranti language spoken in the eastern Himalayan hills of eastern Nepal by Kirati Bantawa ethnic groups. They use a syllabic alphabet system known as Kirat Rai. Among the Khambu or Rai people of Koshi Province in Nepal, Sikkim, Darjeeling and Kalimpong in India, Bantawa is the most extensively spoken language. According to the 2001 National Census, at least 1.63% of the Nepal's total population speaks Bantawa. About 370,000 speak Bantawa language mostly in eastern hilly regions of Nepal (2001). Although Bantawa is among the more widely used variety of the Bantawa language, it falls in the below-100,000 category of endangered languages. It is experiencing language shift to Nepali, especially in the northern region.

Bantawa is spoken in subject–object–verb order, and has no noun classes or genders.

== Dialects ==
Most of the Bantawa clan are now settled in Bhojpur, Dharan, Illam, and Dhankuta. Recent figures show most of them are settled in Dharan. Bantawa is spoken in the following districts of Nepal (Ethnologue).

- Koshi Province: Bhojpur District, Dhankuta District, Ilam District, Jhapa District, Khotang District, Morang District, Okhaldhunga District, Panchthar District, Sunsari District, Taplejung District and Udayapur District
- Sikkim, Darjeeling, Kalimpong of India

Dialects are as follows (Ethnologue).

- Northern Bantawa (Chhinangkhongeli and dilpali)

Northern subdialects: Siptungkhali, Mangpahang, Awaichha, Rungchenbung and Yangma

- Southern Bantawa (Chewali, Okhreli, Hatuwali, Hangkhim)

Southern and Northern Bantawa, similar, could be united as 'Intermediate Bantawa'.

- Eastern Bantawa (Dhankuta)

Eastern dialect is the most divergent. It is most closely related to Dungmali language, though also related to Puma language, Sampang language, and Chhintange language.

- Western Bantawa (Amchoke, Amchauke)

Amchaucke dialects: Sorung, Saharaja, Lulam, and Sukita

- Wana Bantawa (also called simply Bantawa), spoken by the Bantawa subcaste. The Amchoke dialect is spoken in the Limbu area, especially in Ilam district.

Bantawa is also considered as a superior clan in the Kiranti family. Bantawa is also reportedly in use as a lingua franca among Rai minorities in Himalayan Sikkim, Darjeeling Kalimpong In India and Bhutan. Meanwhile, the language is just being introduced in a few schools at the primary level (Year 1 – Year 5) using Devanagari script.

The extinct Waling language attested from the late 19th century may have been a variety of Bantawa, or a closely related language, if not the Hatuwali dialect the Waling people speak today.

== Phonology ==
=== Vowels ===
Vowel phonemes
	Front	Central	Back
	unrounded		Back
Close	i ᤀᤡ ⟨इ⟩	ɨ ~ ə ᤀ ⟨उ़⟩	u ᤀᤢ ⟨उ⟩
Close-mid	e ᤀᤣ ⟨ए⟩	ɨ ~ ə ᤀ ⟨उ़⟩	o ᤀᤥ ⟨ओ⟩
Open-mid		ɨ ~ ə ᤀ ⟨उ़⟩	ʌ ᤀᤨ ⟨अ⟩
Open		ä ᤀᤠ ⟨आ⟩	

- ʌ vowel comes in Bantawa due to influence of Nepali language and it is rarely used like in other Tibetan Burmese language.
- nowadays some dialect or in region may pronounce /ɨ/ as [ʌ], [u], or [ə].

Example: mɨk (eye) pronounce as mʌk, pɨ (snake) as pʌ.

=== Consonants ===
Bantawa consonant phonemes
			Bilabial	Dental	Apico- alveolar	Lamino- alveolar	Palatal	Velar	Glottal
Nasal			m ᤔ ⟨म⟩		n ᤏ ⟨न⟩			ŋ ᤅ ⟨ङ⟩	
Plosive/ Affricate	voiceless	unaspirated	p ᤐ ⟨प⟩	t̪ ᤋ ⟨त⟩	t ᤋ ⟨ट⟩	t͡s ᤆ ⟨च⟩		k ᤁ ⟨क⟩	ʔ ᤹ ⟨:⟩
Plosive/ Affricate	voiceless	aspirated	pʰ ᤑ ⟨फ⟩	t̪ʰ ᤌ ⟨थ⟩	tʰ ᤌ ⟨ठ⟩	t͡sʰ ᤇ ⟨छ⟩		kʰ ᤂ ⟨ख⟩	
Plosive/ Affricate	voiced	unaspirated	b ᤒ ⟨ब⟩	d̪ ᤍ ⟨द⟩	d ᤍ ⟨ड⟩	d͡z ᤈ ⟨ज⟩		ɡ ᤃ ⟨ग⟩	
Plosive/ Affricate	voiced	aspirated	bʱ ᤓ ⟨भ⟩	d̪ʱ ᤎ ⟨ध⟩	dʱ ᤎ ⟨ढ⟩	d͡zʱ ᤉ ⟨झ⟩		ɡʱ ᤄ ⟨घ⟩	
Fricative					s ᤛ ⟨स⟩				ɦ ᤜ ⟨ह⟩
Trill					r ᤖ ⟨र⟩				
Lateral					l ᤗ ⟨ल⟩				
Approximant			w ᤘ ⟨व⟩				j ᤕ ⟨य⟩		

- Glotta stop [ʔ] is one of the consonants of Bantawa language which is represent by using ⟨:⟩.
- Dental consonant and Apico-alveolar does not make any difference while speaking.
- To write Bantawa language Kirat Sirijunga lipi and Devanagari lipi is being used in Nepal.

== Vocabulary ==
Bantawa	IPA	Nepali	English
Sewa सेवा	sewä	नमस्ते	Good Morning/Afternoon/Evening,
Kok कोक	kok	भात	Food, Rice
Khan खान	kʰän	तरकारी	Curry
Münachi मनाचि	mɨnätsi	मानिसहरू	People
Diwa दिवा	diwä	बाजे	Grandfather
Dima दिमा	dimä	बजू	Grandmother
Papa पापा	päpä	बुबा	Father
Mama मामा	mämä	आमा	Mother
Nana नाना	nänä	दिदी	Elder-sister
Nichhama निछामा	nitsʰmä	बहिनी	Little-Sister
Dewa देवा	dewä	ठूलो बुबा	Uncle elder to dad
Dema देमा	demä	बडी आमा	Aunt Elder to Dad/ Dad's elder sister-in-law
Baŋa बाङा	bäŋä	काका	Uncle younger to Dad
Chhɨna छ़ना	tsʰɨnä	काकी	Younger uncle wife
Büwa ब़वा	bɨwä	दाजु	Elder Brother
Nichha निछा	nit͡sʰä	भाइ	Younger Brother
Nichha'o Chhachi निछा:ओ छाची	nitsʰäʔo tsʰätsi	भाइबहिनीका छोराछोरी	Brothers' or sisters' children
Aachhuwa, chhuwa आछुवा, छुवा	ätsʰuwa tsʰuwa	मामा	Mother's younger Brother
Phekwa फेकवा	pek-wa	पैसा	Money
Teet तित	tit	लुगा	Cloths
Cha'wa चा:वा	t͡säʔwä	पानी	Water
Mi मि	mi	आगो	Fire
Thuli थुलि	tʰuli	पिठो	Flour
Sampicha साम्पिचा	sämpit͡sä	कोदो	Millet
Khabat, Wachhon खाबात, वाछोन	kʰäwät wät͡sʰon	जाड	Locally brew wine
Hengmawa हेङमावा	heŋmäwä	रक्सी	Rum/Whisky/Brandy
Sa सा	sä	मासु	Meat
Chhüna छ़ना	t͡sʰɨnä	फुपु	Aunt (Father's sister)
Diwa, Dima दिवा, दिमा	diwä dimä	हजुरबुवा, हजुरआमा	Grandfather, Grandmother
Oyatni ओयात्नी	ohyätni	यहाँ तिर	Here
Moyatni मोयात्नी	moyätni	त्यहाँ तिर	There
Khada खादा	kʰädä	कहाँ	Where
Demni देम्नी	demni	कति	How
Unni उन्नी	unni	यति मात्र	This much
Chama चामा	t͡sämä	खानु	to Eat
Tücha त़चा	tɨ t͡sä	खाने हो?	Do you want to eat?
Kok Tücha? कोक त़चा ?	kok tɨ t͡sä	खाना खाने हो ?	Do you eat rice?
Küng	kɨŋ	दात	teeth
Ütlo	ɨt-lo	नराम्रो, खराब	bad
Munima मुनिमा	munimä	बिरालो	Cat
