= Rai language =

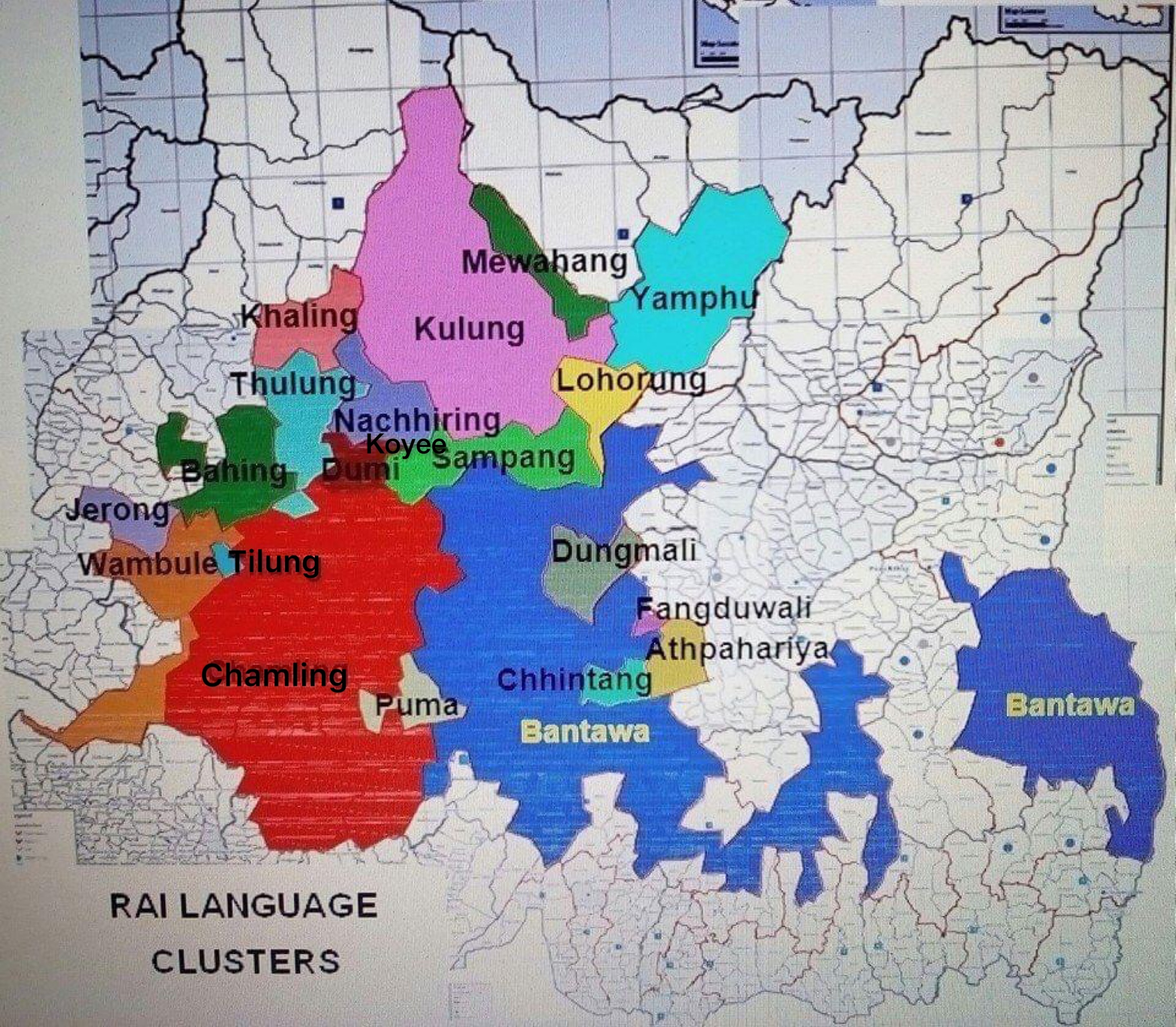
Rai languages cluster's distribution in eastern Nepal's Province No. 1. These include Bantawa, Chamling, Kulung, Thulung, Athpahariya, Dungmali, Lohorung, Yamphu, Mewahang, Sampang, Jerung, Bahing, Tilung, Wambule, Dumi, Puma, Chhiling, Phangduwali, Chhintang, Nachhiring and Koiyu.

Rai language may refer to:

- Rai languages or the Kiranti languages, a family of Sino-Tibetan languages spoken in Nepal, India and Bhutan by the Rai people.
  - Bantawa language, a Kiranti language spoken in Nepal, Darjeeling, Sikkim, Kalimpong and Bhutan
  - Chamling language, a Kiranti language spoken in parts of Nepal and Darjeeling, Sikkim, Kalimpong and southern Bhutan
  - Thulung language, a Kiranti language spoken in parts of Nepal and Sikkim
  - Bahing language, a Kiranti language spoken in the eastern part of Nepal, particularly Okhaldhunga and Solukhumbu districts. There are a few Bahing communities in Khotang and Terhathum.
  - Khaling language, a Kiranti language spoken in the northern part of Solukhumbu district
  - Kulung language, a Kiranti language spoken in the north-west part of Solukhumbu district

== See also ==
- Rai Coast languages, a family of languages in the Madang stock of New Guinea, not related to Rai languages or Dewas Rai
- Rai people, an indigenous ethnolinguistic group of Nepal and some north eastern regions of India
- Sakela, a festival of the Kirat Rai people
