= Khotehang Rural Municipality =

Khotehang खोटेहाङ गाउँपालिका
- Rural Municipality
- Location in Province No. 1 Khotehang (Nepal)
- Coordinates: 27.0266°N 86.8471°E
- Province: Province No. 1
- District: Khotang
- Wards: 9
- Established: 10 March 2017
- Seat: Khotang Bazar

Government
  - Type: Village Council
  - Chairperson: Mr. Pradip Rai (NCP)
  - Vice-chairperson: Mrs. Kabita Rai (NCP)

Area
  - Total: 164.09 km^{2} (63.36 sq mi)

Population (2019)
  - Total: 23,731
  - Density: 144.62/km^{2} (374.57/sq mi)
- Time zone: UTC+5:45 (Nepal Standard Time)
- Website: official website

Khotehang (Nepali: खोटेहाङ गाउँपालिका) is a rural municipality (gaunpalika) in Khotang District of Province No. 1 of Nepal.

According to Ministry of Federal Affairs and Local Development, Khotehang has an area of 164.09 square kilometres (63.36 mi^{2}) and the total population of the municipality is 23731 as of Census of Nepal 2011.

== History ==
Fulfilling the requirement of the new Constitution of Nepal 2015, the Ministry of Federal Affairs and Local Development replaced all old VDCs and Municipalities into 753 new local level bodies (Municipality). Therefore, Indrayani Pokhari, Khotang Bazar, Chipring, Badka Dipali, Linkuwa Pokhari, Lichki Ramche, Woplukha, Sawakatahare and Simpani which previously were all separate Village development committees merged to form this new local level body.{cn}

The rural municipality is divided into total 9 wards and the headquarters of this newly formed rural municipality is situated in Khotang Bazar.

== Transportation ==
Thamkharka Airport lies in Old-Khotang Bazar offering flights to Biratnagar and Kathmandu.
