= Kepilasgadhi Rural Municipality =

Kepilasgadhi केपिलासगढी गाउँपालिका
- Rural Municipality
- Location in Province No. 1 Kepilasgadhi (Nepal)
- Coordinates: 27.33°N 86.83°E
- Province: Province No. 1
- District: Khotang
- Wards: 7
- Established: 10 March 2017
- Seat: Baksila

Government
  - Type: Village Council
  - Chairperson: Mr. Samir Rai (NC)
  - Vice-chairperson: Mr Gururaj Rai (PSP-N)

Area
  - Total: 191.28 km^{2} (73.85 sq mi)

Population (2011)
  - Total: 15,288
  - Density: 79.925/km^{2} (207.00/sq mi)
- Time zone: UTC+5:45 (Nepal Standard Time)
- Website: official website

Kepilasgadhi (Nepali: केपिलासगढी गाउँपालिका) is a rural municipality (gaunpalika) out of eight rural municipality located in Khotang District of Province No. 1 of Nepal. There are a total of 10 municipalities in Khotang in which 2 are urban and 8 are rural.

According to Ministry of Federal Affairs and Local Developme Jantedhunga has an area of 191.28 square kilometres (73.85 mi^{2}) and the total population of the municipality is 15288 as of Census of Nepal 2011.

Phedi, Khartamchha, Baspani, Baksila, Sapteshwar, Dipsung and Sungdel which previously were all separate Village development committee merged to form this new local level body. Fulfilling the requirement of the new Constitution of Nepal 2015, Ministry of Federal Affairs and Local Development replaced all old VDCs and Municipalities into 753 new local level body (Municipality).

The rural municipality is divided into total 7 wards and the headquarter of this newly formed rural municipality is situated in Baksila.
