= Aiselukharka Rural Municipality =

Place in Nepal

as ऐसेलुखर्क गाउँपालिका
- Rural Municipality
- Location in Province No. 1 as (Nepal)
- Coordinates: 27.17°N 86.59°E
- Province: Province No. 1
- District: Khotang
- Wards: 7
- Established: 10 March 2017
- Seat: Ainselu Kharka

Government
  - Type: Village Council
  - Chairperson: Mr. Vishwanath Niraula (NC)
  - Vice-chairperson: Mrs. Pushpakala Bhujel (NCP)

Area
  - Total: 125.93 km^{2} (48.62 sq mi)

Population (2011)
  - Total: 16,097
  - Density: 127.82/km^{2} (331.07/sq mi)
- Time zone: UTC+5:45 (Nepal Standard Time)
- Website: official website

Aiselukharka (Nepali: ऐसेलुखर्क गाउँपालिका) is a rural municipality (gaunpalika) out of eight rural municipality located in Khotang District of Province No. 1 of Nepal. There are a total of 10 municipalities in Khotang in which 2 are urban and 8 are rural.

According to Ministry of Federal Affairs and Local Developme Aiselukharka has an area of 125.93 square kilometres (48.62 mi^{2}) and the total population of the municipality is 16097 as of Census of Nepal 2011.

Ainselu Kharka, Ribdung Jaleshwari, Jyamire, Bakachol, Ribdung Maheshwari, Magpa and Rakha Bangdel which previously were all separate Village development committee merged to form this new local level body. Fulfilling the requirement of the new Constitution of Nepal 2015, Ministry of Federal Affairs and Local Development replaced all old VDCs and Municipalities into 753 new local level body (Municipality).

The rural municipality is divided into total 7 wards and the headquarter of this newly formed rural municipality is situated in Ainselu Kharka.

== Climate ==
Climate data for Aiselukharka, elevation 2,143 m (7,031 ft)
| Month | Jan | Feb | Mar | Apr | May | Jun | Jul | Aug | Sep | Oct | Nov | Dec | Year |
|---|---|---|---|---|---|---|---|---|---|---|---|---|---|
| Mean daily maximum °C (°F) | 12.1 (53.8) | 13.8 (56.8) | 18.2 (64.8) | 19.3 (66.7) | 20.1 (68.2) | 20.8 (69.4) | 21.5 (70.7) | 21.7 (71.1) | 20.6 (69.1) | 19.5 (67.1) | 16.8 (62.2) | 13.8 (56.8) | 18.2 (64.7) |
| Daily mean °C (°F) | 6.0 (42.8) | 7.5 (45.5) | 11.5 (52.7) | 14.3 (57.7) | 15.6 (60.1) | 17.2 (63.0) | 18.0 (64.4) | 17.8 (64.0) | 16.7 (62.1) | 14.6 (58.3) | 10.6 (51.1) | 7.4 (45.3) | 13.1 (55.6) |
| Mean daily minimum °C (°F) | 0.0 (32.0) | 1.3 (34.3) | 4.9 (40.8) | 9.5 (49.1) | 11.3 (52.3) | 13.6 (56.5) | 14.6 (58.3) | 14.1 (57.4) | 13.1 (55.6) | 9.8 (49.6) | 4.3 (39.7) | 1.0 (33.8) | 8.1 (46.6) |
| Average precipitation mm (inches) | 18.4 (0.72) | 14.3 (0.56) | 32.1 (1.26) | 75.6 (2.98) | 190.1 (7.48) | 420.5 (16.56) | 592.8 (23.34) | 523.4 (20.61) | 312.5 (12.30) | 111.2 (4.38) | 15.7 (0.62) | 12.3 (0.48) | 2,318.9 (91.29) |
Source: FAO JICA
