= Diprung Rural Municipality =

Diprung Chuichumma दिप्रुङ चुईचुम्मा गाउँपालिका
- Rural Municipality
- Location in Province No. 1 Diprung Chuichumma (Nepal)
- Coordinates: 27.12°N 86.86°E
- Province: Province No. 1
- District: Khotang
- Wards: 7
- Established: 10 March 2017
- Seat: याङ्गसोलाटार

Government
  - Type: Village Council
  - Chairperson: Mr. Lokendra Rai (UML)
  - Vice-chairperson: Mrs. Aruna Thapa Magar (UML)

Area
  - Total: 136.48 km^{2} (52.70 sq mi)

Population (2011)
  - Total: 16,305
  - Density: 119.47/km^{2} (309.42/sq mi)
- Time zone: UTC+5:45 (Nepal Standard Time)
- Website: official website

Diprung Chuichumma (Nepali: दिप्रुङ चुईचुम्मा गाउँपालिका) is a rural municipality (gaunpalika), and one of eight rural municipalities located in Khotang District of Province No. 1 in Nepal. There are a total of 10 municipalities in Khotang in which 2 are urban and 8 are rural.

According to Ministry of Federal Affairs and Local Developme Diprung has an area of 136.48 square kilometres (52.70 mi^{2}) and the total population of the municipality is 20175 as of Census of Nepal 2011.

The separate Village Development Committees (VDCs) of Chhitapokhari, Chhorambu, Dandagaun, Batase, Yamkhya, Tempa and Santeshwar Chhitapokhari were consolidated to form Diprung Chuichumma. Fulfilling the requirement of the new Constitution of Nepal 2015, the Ministry of Federal Affairs and Local Development replaced all old VDCs and Municipalities into 753 new local-level bodies (Municipality).

Diprung Chuichumma rural municipality is divided into total 7 wards and the headquarters of this newly formed rural municipality are in Chhitapokhari.
