= Sunkoshi Corridor =

Highway in Nepal

Sunkoshi Corridor सुनकोशी करिडोर
- राष्ट्रिय राजमार्ग १२
- National Highway 12
- NH12 in red

Route information
- Maintained by MoPIT (Department of Roads)
- Length: 163 km (101 mi)

Major junctions
- East end: Barkhadada
- Regmitar
- West end: Ghurmi

Location
- Country: Nepal
- Provinces: Koshi Province
- District: Udayapur, Bhojpur, Khotang

Highway system
- Roads in Nepal
← NH11	→ NH13

NH12 or Sunkoshi Corridor (Nepali: सुनकोशी करिडोर) or Ghurmi-Regmitar-Barkhadada road is a National Highway that runs through the Hills of Udayapur District, Bhojpur District and Khotang District of Koshi Province, Nepal. It is currently under construction. The total length of the highway is calculated to be 163 kilometres (101 mi).

The highway starts at Ghurmi (Udayapur) being separated from NH03 and runs parallel to the Sunkoshi River until Thanagaun (Tapli Rural Municipality) before it crosses the Sunkoshi river and enters into Khotang District. It then runs parallel to the Sunkoshi River again until it reaches Regmitar. The highway then crosses NH16 at Regmitar (Rajapani). The highway continues on to Damarkhu where it crosses the border of Khotang District and enters into Bhojpur District. This section of road runs in the Aamchowk Rural Municipality of Bhojpur District before it crosses the Sunkoshi River again and enters into Udayapur District again at Ranitar of the Chaudandigadhi Municipality then moves east and enters to Belaka Municipality. It finally merges with NH03 at Barkhadanda near Chatara Koshi bridge.

NH12 (in detail)
#	Section Link	Section Name	Length (KM)	Area
1	NH12-001	Ghurmi-Thanagaun	26.21	Katari Municipality; Tapli Rural Municipality
2	NH12-002	Thanagaun-Regmitar	22.21	Halesi Tuwachung,
3	NH12-003	Regmitar-Darmarkhu	72.91	Diprung Rural Municipality; Khotehang Rural Municipality; Jantedhunga Rural Municipality
4	NH12-004	Darmarkhu-Ranitar Bazar	12.92	Aamchowk Rural Municipality
5	NH12-005	Ranitar Bazar-Barkhadada	28.75	Chaudandigadhi Municipality; Belaka Municipality
	NH12	Ghurmi-Regmitar-Barkhadada	163	Koshi Province
