= Jantedhunga Rural Municipality =

Jantedhunga जन्तेढुङ्गा गाउँपालिका
- Rural Municipality
- Rural Municipality in Province No. 1, Nepal

- Location in Province No. 1 Jantedhunga (Nepal)
- Coordinates: 26.966667°N 86.883333°E
- Province: Province No. 1
- District: Khotang
- Wards: 6
- Established: 10 March 2017
- Seat: Chisapani

Government
  - Type: Government CouncilVillage Council
  - Chief Of Village Council: Mr. Shankar Bahadur Rai (NCP)
  - Deputy Chief -->: Mrs. Bimala Rai (NCP)

Area
  - Total: 128.62 km^{2} (49.66 sq mi)

Population (2011)
  - Total: 15,444
  - Density: 120.07/km^{2} (310.99/sq mi)
- Time zone: UTC+5:45 (Nepal Standard Time)
- Website: official website

Jantedhunga (Nepali: जन्तेढुङ्गा गाउँपालिका) is a rural municipality (gaunpalika) out of eight rural municipality located in Khotang District of Province No. 1 of Nepal. There are a total of 10 municipalities in Khotang in which 2 are urban and 8 are rural.

According to Ministry of Federal Affairs and Local Developme Jantedhunga has an area of 128.62 square kilometres (49.66 mi^{2}) and the total population of the municipality is 15444 as of Census of Nepal 2011.

Kaule, Chisapani, Damarkhu Shivalaya, Diplung, Devisthan, Khotang and Wopung which previously were all separate Village development committee merged to form this new local level body. Fulfilling the requirement of the new Constitution of Nepal 2015, Ministry of Federal Affairs and Local Development replaced all old VDCs and Municipalities into 753 new local level body (Municipality).

The rural municipality is divided into total 6 wards and the headquarter of this newly formed rural municipality is situated in Chisapani.
