= Sakela =

Festival of Kirat Khambu Rai people

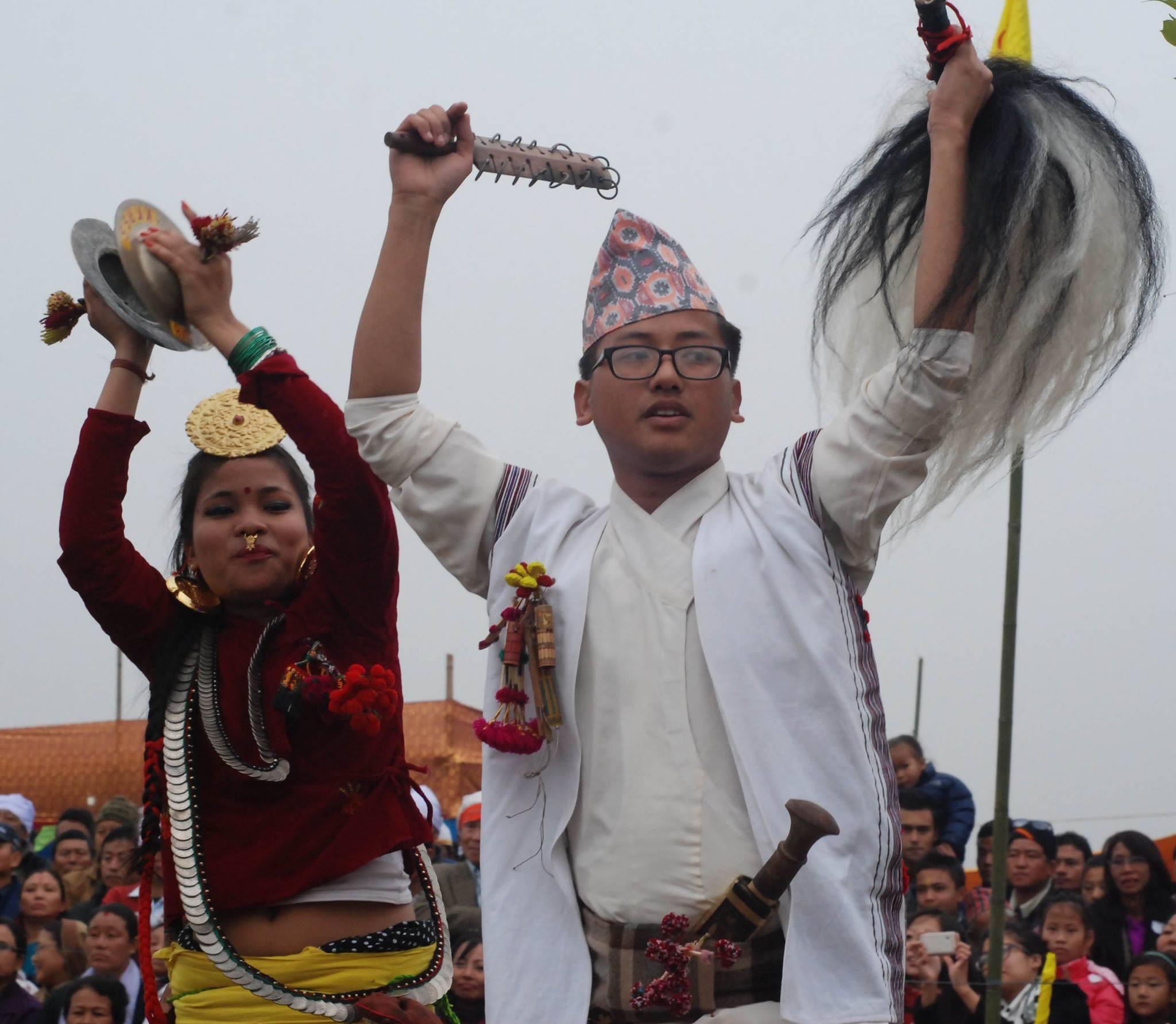
- Khambu Rai boy and girl performing Sakela Sili dance in Chawrasta Darjeeling
- Also called: Sakela, Fagu, Buichor Chamling; Sakewa, Sakenwa: Bantawa; Sakhewa: Sampang; Sakewa, Fagulak: Puma; Sakelwa: Nachhiring; Wass: Khaling; Tòsī: Kulung; Tòsh: Thulung; Tòshu: Dumi; Yummang, Eksamang: Lohorung, Yamphu; Segro: Bahing; Whawmo: Wambule
- Observed by: Kirat Khambu Rais around the world
- Observances: Sakela sili, cultural group dance, religious services, family meetings, relative meetings
- Begins: Sakela Udhauli (full moon day of Mangsir) and Sakela Ubhauli (full moon day of Baishak)
- Ends: After 15 days
- 2026 date: 1 May: Sakela Ubhauli; 23 December: Sakela Udhauli

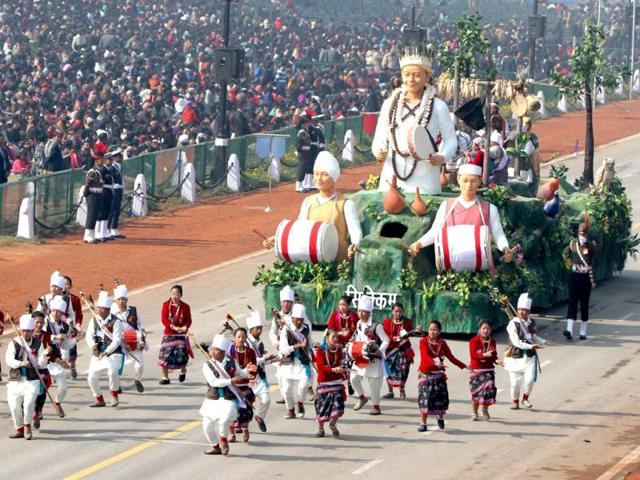
Rai Community of Sikkim representing Tableau of Sakewa Sili on 63rd Indian Republic Day 2012 Rajpath New Delhi

Sakela, also known as Sakewa or Sakenwa (Nepali: साकेला), is one of the main festivals of the Khambu (Rai people), an ethnic group indigenous to eastern Nepal and the Sikkim, Kalimpong, and Darjeeling regions of India. Sakela is celebrated twice a year and is distinguished by two names: Ubhauli and Udhauli. Sakela Ubhauli is celebrated on Baisakh Purnima (the day of the full moon in the month of Baisakh) and Sakela Udhauli is celebrated on the day of the full moon in the month of Mangsir.

== Significance ==
Kirats are shamanists and animistic. The Sakela celebration is a prayer to Mother Nature for healthy crops and protection from natural calamities. Starting on Baisakh Purnima, Sakela Ubhauli is celebrated for fifteen days in Baisakh (April–May), marking the beginning of the farming year. Similarly, the celebration of Sakela Udhauli during Mangsir (November–December), which is the harvest season, thanks Mother Nature for a good harvest. In this festival the Rai people honour Bhumi Dev, an Earth goddess.

== Sakela dance ==
The main characteristic of this festival is a ritual dance call Sakela dance performed by large groups of Kirats, wearing their traditional attire. People from all ages dance together in a large circle. There are male and female leaders in each circle known as Silimangpa and Silimangma respectively. They choreograph the dance moves known as sili while others follow them. The term "sili" reflects the different aspects of human life and their relationship with nature.

== Variations ==
Among Kirats, Sunuwar and Rai celebrate this festival, whereas the Yakkhas and the Limbus have their own Youchyang and Chasok Tangnam. Despite important local variations, indigenists view these dances as specific as well as common to all Kirat.

== Nomenclature ==
Sakela is called by different names in the different Khambu languages. The Chamling sub-tribe calls it Sakela, Bantawas call it Sakewa or Sakenwa, while the Thulungs call it Toshi.

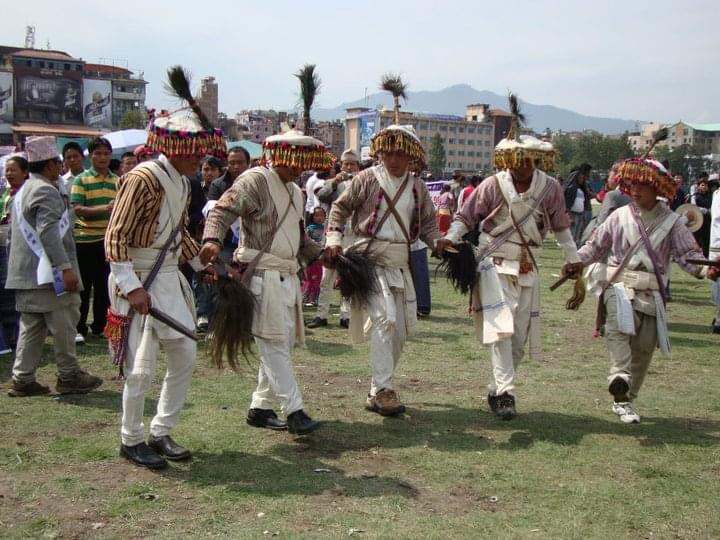
Bahing or Bayung Rai performing Segro Silli dance.

Among the various Rai languages Sakela is also called:

- Sakewa or Sakenwa in Bantawa, Dungmali and the Mewahang languages
- Tosh Kulung and Nachhiring
- Toshi in Thulung
- Segro in Bahing
- Iksamang or Balipuja in Lohorung and Yamphu
- Fagulak in Puma

== Gallery ==
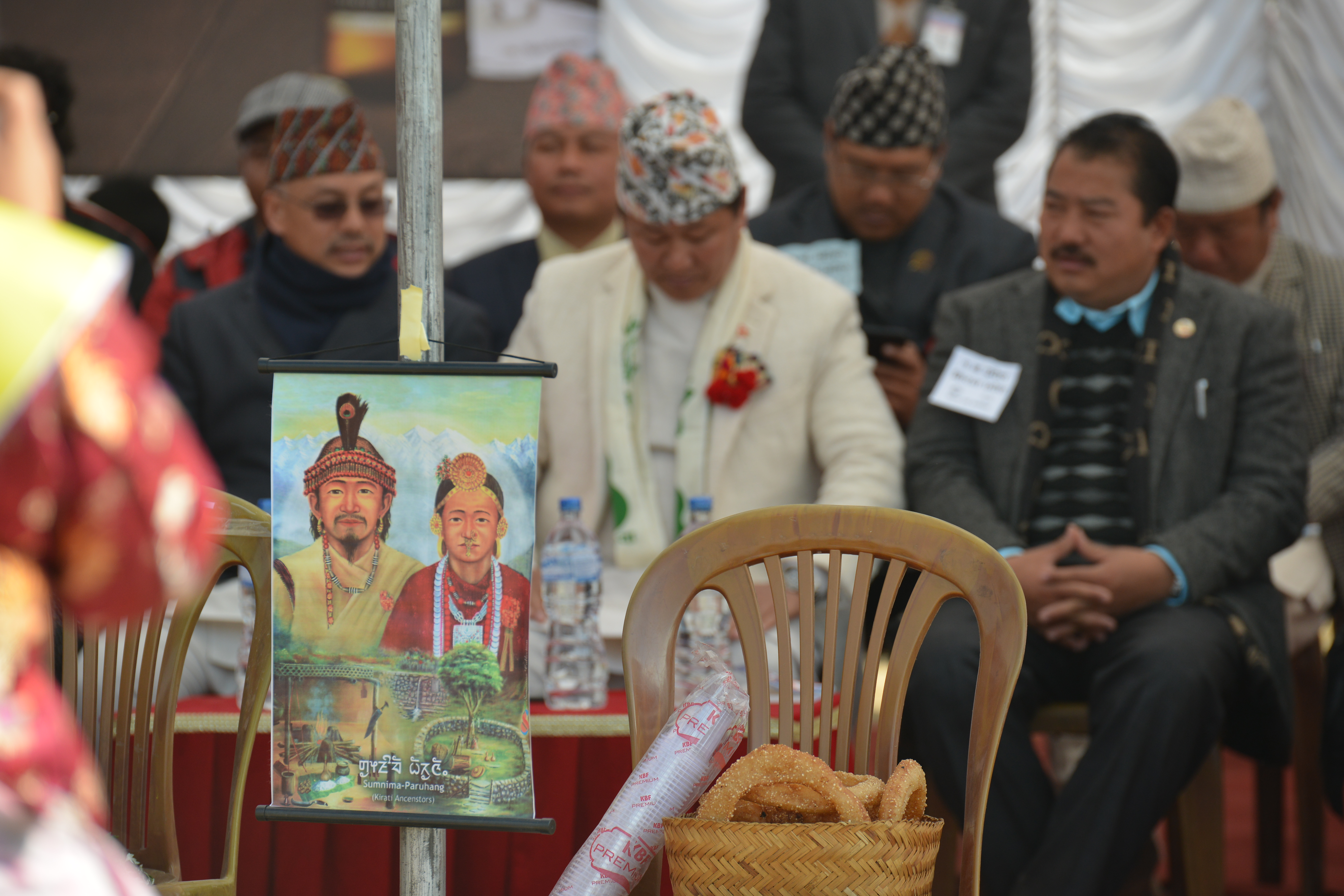
Offerings made to Paruhang and Sumnima, the ancestral deity

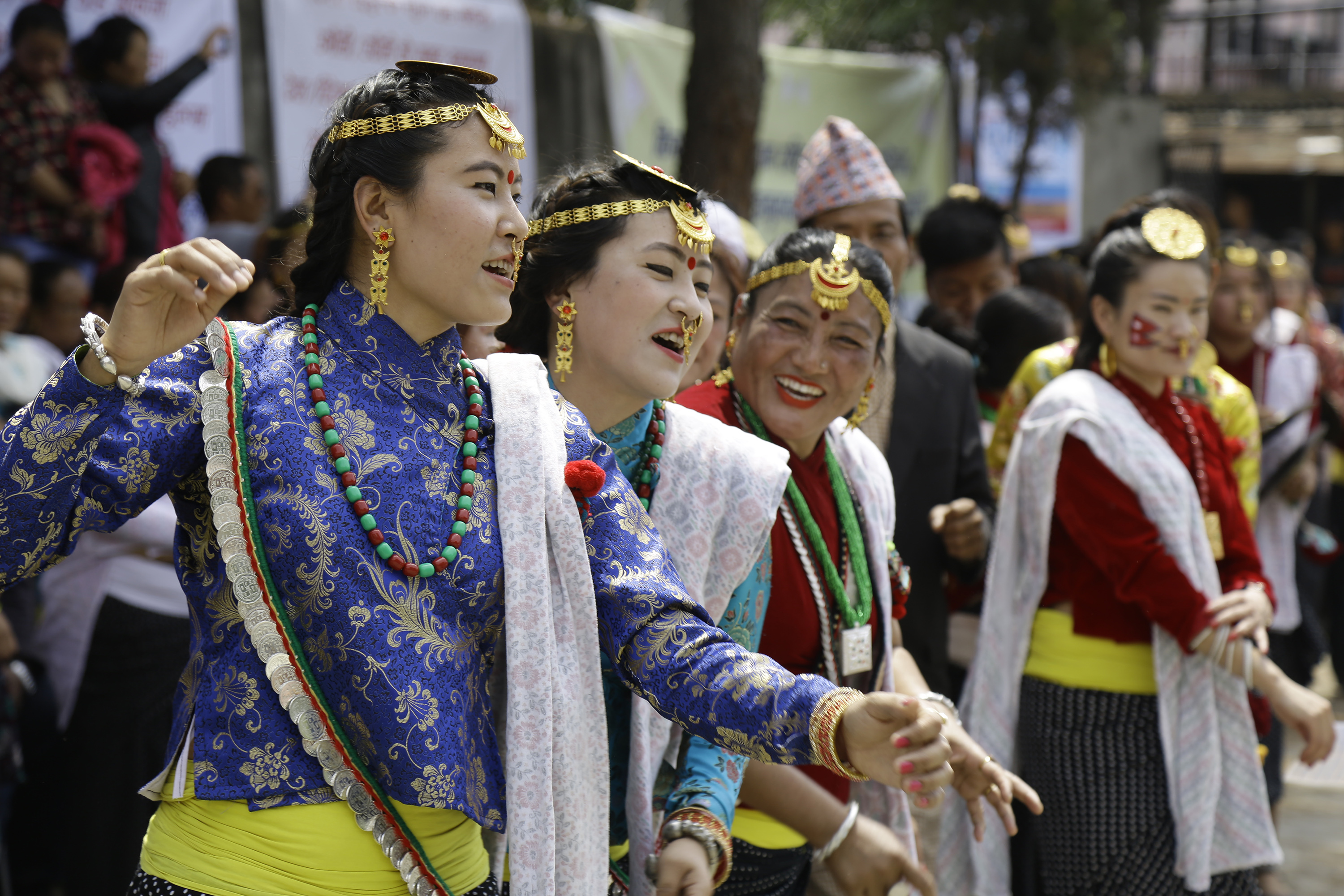
Kirati Rai women in Sakela Ubhauli festival

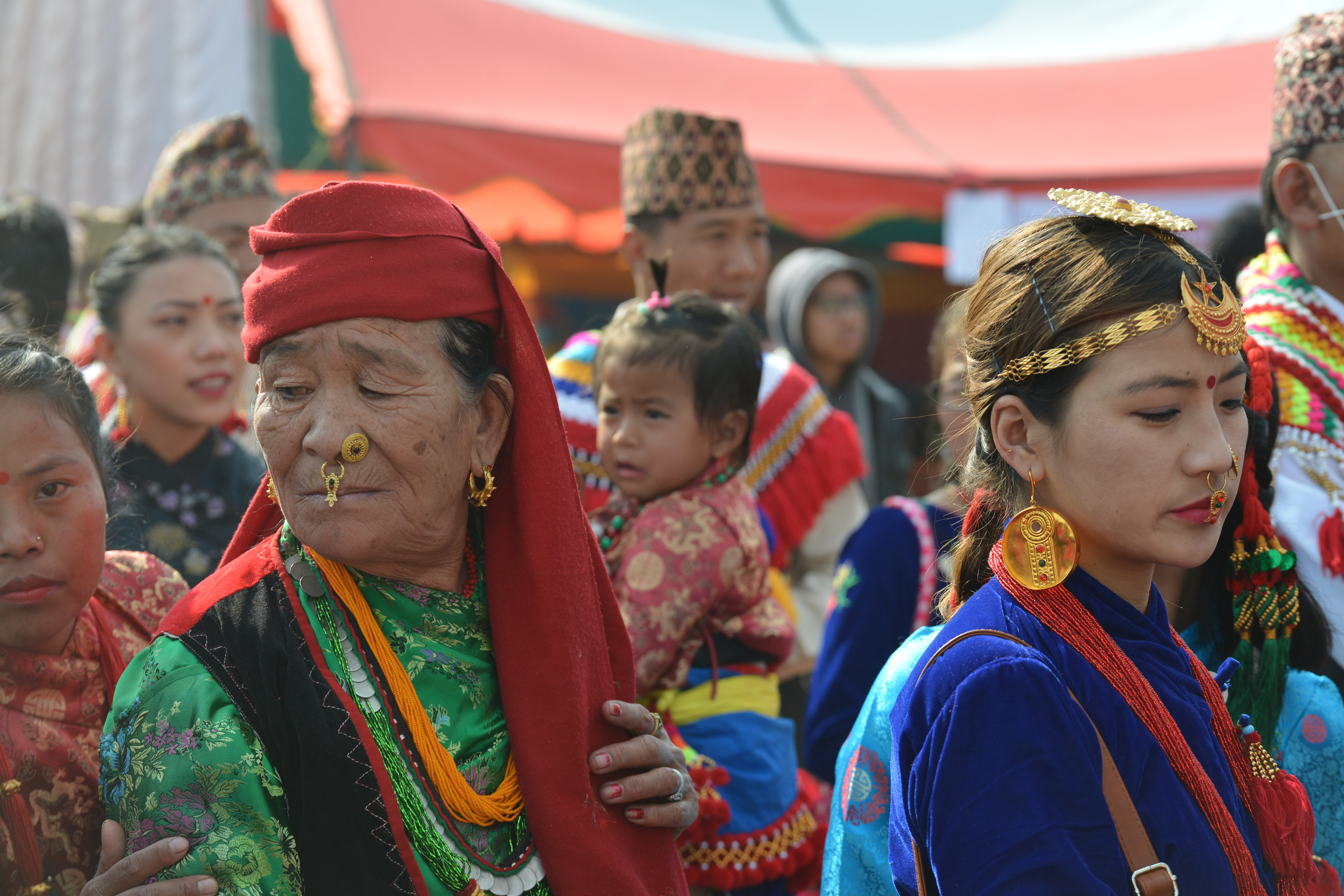
Women in traditional Rai wear (2019)

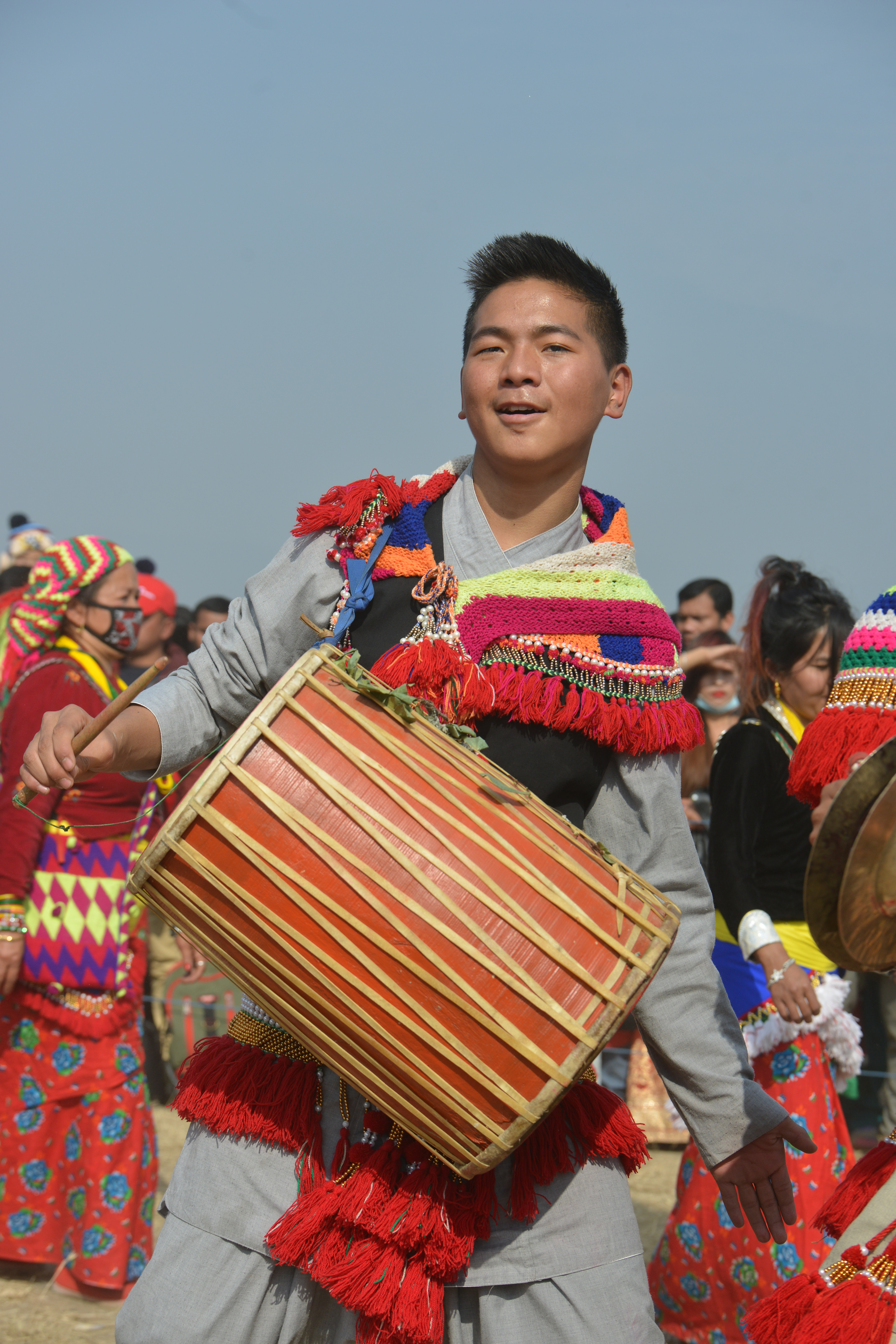
A Rai man playing traditional drum (Dhol)

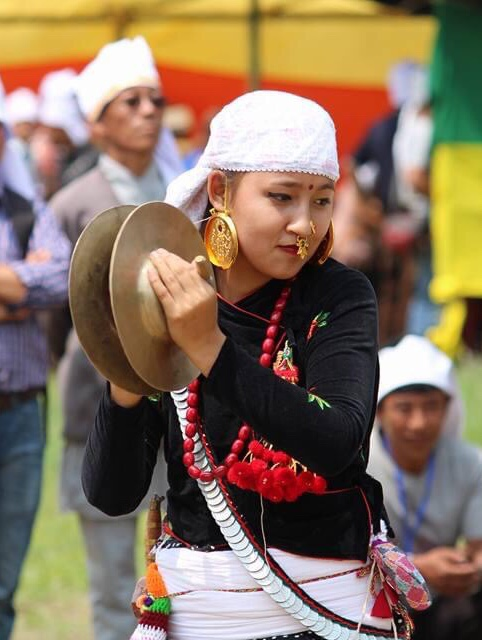
Rai Girl Playing Jhyamta in Sakela Ubhauli festival (2017 Kurseong)

== See also ==
- Kirat Mundhum
- Kirat Region
