= Sakela Rural Municipality =

Sakela साकेला गाउँपालिका
- Rural Municipality
- Location in Province No. 1 Sakela (Nepal)
- Coordinates: 27.16°N 86.84°E
- Province: Province No. 1
- District: Khotang
- Wards: 5
- Established: 10 March 2017
- Seat: Mattim Birta

Government
  - Type: Rural Council
  - Chairperson: Mr. Arjun Kumar Khadka (NCP)
  - Vice-chairperson: Mrs. Sarita Khadka (NC)

Area
  - Total: 79.99 km^{2} (30.88 sq mi)

Population (2011)
  - Total: 11,594
  - Density: 144.9/km^{2} (375.4/sq mi)
- Time zone: UTC+5:45 (Nepal Standard Time)
- Website: official website

Sakela (Nepali: साकेला गाउँपालिका, Sākēlā Gāum̥pālikā) is a rural municipality (gaunpalika) out of eight rural municipality located in Khotang District of Province No. 1 of Nepal. There are a total of 10 municipalities in Khotang in which 2 are urban and 8 are rural.

According to Ministry of Federal Affairs and Local Developme Sakela has an area of 79.99 square kilometres (30.88 mi^{2}) and the total population of the municipality is 11594 as of Census of Nepal 2011.

Khidima, Chyandanda, Mattim Birta and Ratancha Majhagaun which previously were all separate Village development committee merged to form this new local level body. Fulfilling the requirement of the new Constitution of Nepal 2015, Ministry of Federal Affairs and Local Development replaced all old VDCs and Municipalities into 753 new local level body (Municipality).

The rural municipality is divided into total 5 wards and the headquarter of this newly formed rural municipality is situated in Mattim Birta.
