= Puma language =

Language of Nepal

Puma
- पुमा
- Pronunciation: [ˈpumaː]
- Region: Khotang district and Udayapur district, Nepal
- Native speakers: 6,700 (2011 census)
- Language family: Sino-Tibetan: Tibeto-Burman; Kiranti; Central Kiranti; Southern; Puma

Language codes
- ISO 639-3: pum
- Glottolog: puma1239
- ELP: Puma

Puma (Puma: पुमा Pumā, rokuŋla~rokoŋla 'jungle language') is a Kiranti language spoken by about 4,310 people (Central Bureau of Statistics report 2001) in Sagarmatha Zone, Nepal. It is a rather conservative and archaic language in comparison to other closely related languages like Bantawa and Chamling.

== Name ==
The same term ‘Puma’ refers both to the people and the language they speak.

== Geographical distribution ==
Puma is spoken in Diplung, Mauwabote, Devisthan, Pauwasera, and Chisapani VDCs of southern Khotang District, and in Beltar and Saunechour VDC's of Udayapur District, Nepal. It is also spoken in Ruwa Khola valley to Buwa Khola, and southward across the Dudh Koshi.

== History ==
The Puma language was only made known in the 1980s, as a result of survey work by the Linguistic Survey of Nepal.

=== Documentation ===
The Himalayan Languages Project has produced the first grammatical sketch of Puma.

== Classification ==
Puma is a Kiranti language, most closely related to Bantawa and Chamling; Dungmali may also belong to the same group. Puma is a relatively conservative Kiranti language; verbal agreement in Puma contains archaic elements unique to the Central branch of Kiranti. The Puma people also preserve various cultural elements which have been lost among the Bantawa and Chamling, such as the hopmacham, a chant commonly sung during marriages praising the forces of creation.

== Status ==
The 2001 Nepal census reported 4,310 speakers of Puma.

== Education ==
Puma language is taught in 14 schools of Barahapokhari and Jantedhunga Rural Municipalities of Khotang district in Nepal since 2020.

== Phonology ==
=== Consonants ===
Puma has 32 consonant phonemes.

		Labial	Dental	Retroflex	Palatal	Dorsal	Glottal
Plosive/ Affricate	voiceless	p	t	ʈ	tʃ	k	
Plosive/ Affricate	voiceless aspirated	pʰ	tʰ	ʈʰ	tʃʰ	kʰ	
Plosive/ Affricate	voiced	b	d	ɖ	dʒ	ɡ	
Plosive/ Affricate	voiced aspirated	bʱ	dʱ	ɖʱ	dʒʱ	ɡʱ	
Nasal	voiced	m	n			ŋ	
Nasal	voiced aspirated	mʱ	nʱ				
Rhotic	voiced			r			
Rhotic	voiced aspirated			rʱ			
Fricative			s				h
Approximant		w	l		j		

=== Vowels ===
Puma has six vowels.

	front	central	back
high	i		u
mid	e	ʌ	o
low		a	

=== Phonotactics ===
Like other Kiranti languages, Puma has a maximum syllable form of (C)(G)V(C)(C) for open syllables and (N)CVC for closed syllables, where G is a glide and N is a nasal.

== Bibliography ==
- Sharma, Narayan Prasad (2014). Morphosyntax of Puma, a Tibeto-Burman language of Nepal (Thesis). SOAS, University of London. doi:10.25501/SOAS.00018554.
- Tara Mani, Rai (2017). A Sociolinguistic Survey of Puma language: A Tibeto-Burman language (PDF). Linguistic Sruvey of Nepal (LinSuN) (Thesis). Central Department of Linguistics, Tribhuvan University.
