= Dumi language =

Kiranti language of Nepal

Dumi
- Region: Khotang district, Nepal
- Ethnicity: Dumi kirat. Ethnic population: 7,640 (2011 census)
- Speakers: Native: 2,500 (2017); L2: 1,000 (2011 census)
- Language family: Sino-Tibetan: Tibeto-Burman; Mahakiranti (?); Kiranti; Western; Upper Dudhkosi; Dumi

Language codes
- ISO 639-3: dus
- Glottolog: dumi1241
- ELP: Dumi

Dumi is a Kiranti language spoken in the area around the Tap and Rava rivers and their confluence in northern Khotang district, Nepal. It is spoken in the villages such as Makpa, Kharbari, Baksila, Sapteshwor, and Kharmi.

Dialects are Kharbari, Lamdija, and Makpa, with Makpa being the most divergent dialect.

== Phonology ==
Consonants
		Labial	Dental	Lamino- alveolopalatal	Alveolar	Dorsal	Glottal
Nasal		m			n	ŋ	
Plosive/ Affricate	voiceless	p	t̪		t	k	ʔ
Plosive/ Affricate	voiceless aspirated	pʰ	t̪ʰ		tʰ	kʰ	
Plosive/ Affricate	voiced	b	d̪	dz	d	ɡ	
Plosive/ Affricate	voiced aspirated	bʱ	d̪ʰ		dʱ	ɡʱ	
Fricative					s		h
Trill					r		
Approximant		w			l	j	

Vowels
	Front		Central		Back	
	Short	Long	Short	Long	Short	Long
High	i	iː	ɨ		u	uː
Mid	e	eː			o	oː
Mid-low	œ		ə			
Low			a	aː		
Diphthongs	əj	e:j	ai		oj	o:ə

== Grammar ==
Dumi is an ergative-absolutive language. Embedded sentences may take on the ergative case. Subjects of intransitive verbs and patients of transitive verbs take the absolutive case. A transitive verb shows agreement with both agent and patient.

Dumi case suffixes
Case	Suffix
Ergative	-(ʔ)a
Absolutive	-ø
Genitive	-(ʔ)a
Locative	-bi, -hoy
Comitative	-kəy
Ablative	-ləkə, -lam, -kə
Comparative	-yikə

Nominal plurality is denoted by the suffix <-mɨl> and duality by the suffix <-nɨ>. The plural suffix precedes the ergative and most case endings.

Personal pronouns distinguish between three persons, three numbers, and between inclusive and exclusive. Third person -ɨm denotes only human referents. tom 'this' and mom 'that' can refer to non-human third person subjects. Additionally, aŋ, an, ɨm, and hammɨl have possessive prefixes o:-, a-, ɨ-, and ham-, respectively. The pronouns abo 'who', mwo: 'what', hempa 'where' and hempo 'which one' occupy the same position as their corresponding non-interrogative pronoun would occupy.

Person	Singular	Dual		Plural	
Person	Singular	Incl.	Excl.	Incl.	Excl.
1	aŋ	intsi	antsɨ	iŋki	aŋkɨ
2	an	antsi		ani	
3	ɨm, tom, mom	ɨmnɨ, ɨntsi		hammɨl, ɨmmɨl	

The default word order is Subject-Object-Verb.

Attributive forms of numerals 1-9 use the numeral classifier -bo, while the attributive forms of other numerals are unmarked. The interrogative pronoun hittakbo 'how many' also carries this classifier.

Dumi numerals
Numeral	Dumi	Numeral	Dumi
1	tɨk	6	mu
2	sak	7	sɨm
3	ryek	8	ɨm
4	tɨm	9	nu/dek
5	ŋo	10	tɨksi

== See also ==
- Jalapa, Nepal
