= Khotang =

Khotang may refer to:

- Khotang District, a district in Province No. 1 of Nepal
- Khotang 1 (constituency), constituency area of Khotang District
- Khotang Bazar, an urban settlement in Khotang District
