= Ghitung =

Former Village Development Committee in Nepal

Coordinates: 28°44′N 82°18′E

Ghitung घितुङ
- Village Development Committee
- Interactive map of Ghitung
- Country: Nepal
- Zone: Sagarmatha Zone
- District: Khotang District

Population (1991)
  - Total: 2,515
- Time zone: UTC+5:45 (Nepal Time)

Ghitung is a village and Village Development Committee in Khotang District in the Sagarmatha Zone of eastern Nepal. At the time of the 1991 Nepal census it had a population of 2,515 persons living in 482 individual households.
