= Nerpa =

Nerpa may refer to:

- Baikal seal (Pusa sibirica), a seal native to Lake Baikal, Siberia
- Nerpa, Nepal
- Russian submarine Nerpa (K-152), an Akula II class submarine
