= KKT =

KKT may refer to:

- Karush–Kuhn–Tucker conditions, in mathematical optimization of nonlinear programming
- kkt (Hungarian: közkereseti társaság), a type of general partnership in Hungary
- Koi language, of Nepal, by ISO 639-3 code
- Kappa Kappa Tau, a fictional sorority in the television series Scream Queens
- Kumamoto Kenmin Televisions, a television station in Kumamoto Prefecture, Japan
