= Tempa, Nepal =

Temma, Nepal टेम्मा
- Village Development Committee
- Country: Nepal
- Zone: Sagarmatha Zone
- District: Khotang District

Population (1991)
  - Total: 4,149
- Time zone: UTC+5:45 (Nepal Time)

Tempa is a village (and has a Village Development Committee) in Khotang District in the Sagarmatha Zone of eastern Nepal. At the time of the 1991 Nepal census, it had a population of 4,149 persons living in 748 individual households.
