= Hanchaur =

Former Village Development Committee in Nepal

Hanchaur हङ्चुर
- Village Development Committee
- Interactive map of Hanchaur
- Country: Nepal
- Zone: Sagarmatha Zone
- District: Khotang District

Population (1991)
  - Total: 2,473
- Time zone: UTC+5:45 (Nepal Time)

Hanchaur is a village and Village Development Committee in Khotang District in the Sagarmatha Zone of eastern Nepal. At the time of the 1991 Nepal census it had a population of 2,473 persons living in 459 individual households.
