= Rakha Dipsung =

Rakha Dipsunराखा वाङ्देल राखा दिप्सुङ rakha bangdel
- Village Development Committee
- Nickname: राखाबाङ्
- Location in Nepal
- Coordinates: 27.37°N 86.86°E
- Country: Nepal
- Zone: Sagarmatha Zone
- District: Khotang District

Population (1991)
  - Total: 972
- Time zone: UTC+5:45 (Nepal Time)

Rakha Dipsung is a village and Village Development Committee in Khotang District in the Sagarmatha Zone of eastern Nepal. At the time of the 1991 Nepal census it had a population of 972.
