= Yamkhya =

Yamkhya याम्खा
- Village Development Committee
- Country: Nepal
- Zone: Sagarmatha Zone
- District: Khotang District

Population (1991)
  - Total: 3,132
- Time zone: UTC+5:45 (Nepal Time)

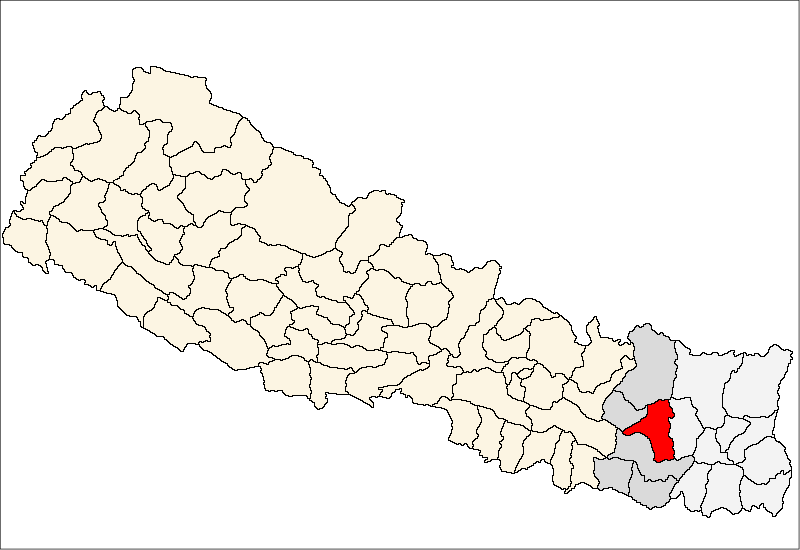
Khotang district

Yamkhya is a village and Village Development Committee in Khotang District in the Sagarmatha Zone of eastern Nepal. At the time of the 1991 Nepal census it had a population of 3,132 persons living in 563 individual households.
