= Nirmalidanda =

Former Village Development Committee in Nepal

Nirmalidanda निर्मलीडाँडा लामाखु लामाखु
- Village Development Committee
- Location in Nepal
- Coordinates: 27.22°N 86.89°E
- Country: Nepal
- Zone: Sagarmatha Zone
- District: Khotang District

Population (2011)
  - Total: 1,967
- Time zone: UTC+5:45 (Nepal Time)

Nirmalidanda is a village and Village Development Committee in Khotang District in the Sagarmatha Zone of eastern Nepal. At the time of the 1991 Nepal census it had a population of 2,326 persons living in 410 individual households.
