= Jalapa, Nepal =

Former Village Development Committee in Nepal

Jalapa, Nepal जाल्पा
- Village Development Committee
- Location in Nepal
- Coordinates: 27.31°N 86.78°E
- Country: Nepal
- Zone: Sagarmatha Zone
- District: Khotang District

Population (1991)
  - Total: 2,351
- Time zone: UTC+5:45 (Nepal Time)

Jalapa is a village and also the Village Development Committee of Khotang District in the Sagarmatha Zone of eastern Nepal is located here. At the time of the 1991 Nepal census, it had a population of 2,351 persons living in 448 individual households.

Jalapa consists of other villages such as Kharbari, Purano Gau and Ghale Gau. Most maps of Nepali does not indicate these villages.
