= Phedi =

Phedi फेदी
- Village Development Committee
- Location in Nepal
- Coordinates: 27.31°N 86.95°E
- Country: Nepal
- Zone: Sagarmatha Zone
- District: Khotang District

Population (1991)
  - Total: 3,731
- Time zone: UTC+5:45 (Nepal Time)

Phedi is a town and Village Development Committee in Khotang District in the Sagarmatha Zone of eastern Nepal. At the time of the 1991 Nepal census it had a population of 3,731 persons living in 730 individual households.
