= Dorpa Chiuridanda =

Former Village Development Committee in Nepal

Dorpa Chiuridanda डोर्पा चिउरीडाँडा
- Village Development Committee
- Location in Nepal
- Coordinates: 27.22°N 86.85°E
- Country: Nepal
- Zone: Sagarmatha Zone
- District: Khotang District

Population (1991)
  - Total: 6,096
- Time zone: UTC+5:45 (Nepal Time)

Dorpa Chiuridanda is a town and Village Development Committee in Khotang District in the Sagarmatha Zone of eastern Nepal. At the time of the 1991 Nepal census it had a population of 6,096 persons living in 1,107 individual households.
