= Dumre Dharapani =

Former Village Development Committee in Nepal

Dumre Dharapani डुम्रे धारापानी
- Village Development Committee
- Location in Nepal
- Coordinates: 27.30°N 86.70°E
- Country: Nepal
- Zone: Sagarmatha Zone
- District: Khotang District

Population (1991)
  - Total: 3,305
- Time zone: UTC+5:45 (Nepal Time)

Dumre Dharapani is a town and Village Development Committee in Khotang District in the Sagarmatha Zone of eastern Nepal. At the time of the 1991 Nepal census, it had a population of 3,305.
