= Arkhale, Khotang =

Village in Khotang, Nepal

Arkhale, Khotang अर्खौले
- Village Development Committee
- Location in Nepal
- Coordinates: 27.5909°N 86.5524°E
- Country: Nepal
- Province: Koshi Province
- District: Khotang District

Population (2001)
  - Total: 3,025
- Time zone: UTC+5:45 (Nepal Time)

Arkhale is a town and Village Development Committee in Khotang District in the Koshi Province of eastern Nepal. At the time of the 2001 Nepal census it had a population of 3,025 persons living in 575 individual households.
