= Dhitung =

Former Village Development Committee in Nepal

Dhitung धितुङ
- Village Development Committee
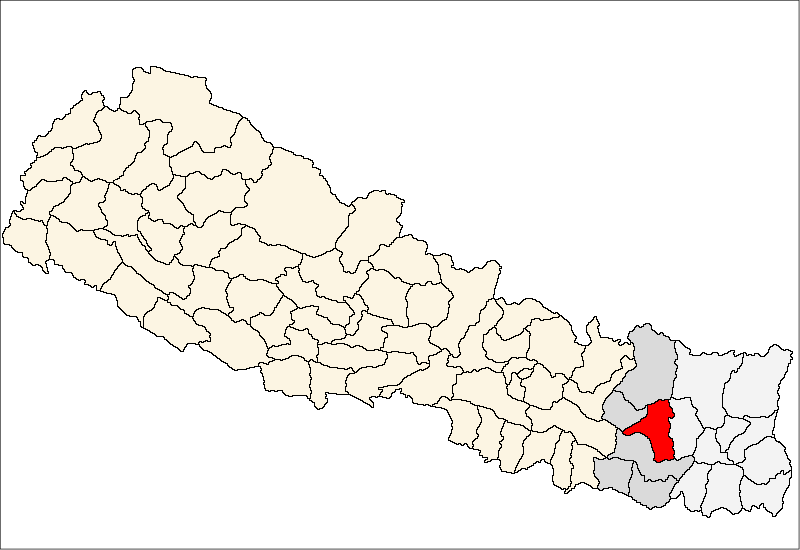

- Location in Nepal
- Coordinates: 27.16°N 86.65°E
- Country: Nepal
- Zone: Sagarmatha Zone
- District: Khotang District

Population (1991)
  - Total: 3,009
- Time zone: UTC+5:45 (Nepal Time)

Dhitung is a village and Village Development Committee in Khotang District in the Sagarmatha Zone of eastern Nepal. At the time of the 1991 Nepal census it had a population of 3,009.
