= Thamkharka Airport =

Thamkharka Airport थामखर्क विमानस्थल
- IATA: none; ICAO: VNTH

Summary
- Airport type: Public
- Owner: Government of Nepal
- Operator: Civil Aviation Authority of Nepal
- Serves: Khotehang, Nepal
- Elevation AMSL: 5,252 ft (1,601 m)
- Coordinates: 27°02′54″N 86°51′29″E

Map
- Location of airport in Nepal

Runways
Direction	Length		Surface
Direction	m	ft	Surface
18/36	630	2,067	Asphalt

Thamkharka Airport (ICAO: VNTH) is a domestic airport located in Khotehang serving Khotang District, a district in Koshi Province in Nepal.

== History ==
The airport was opened on 19 October 2001. The runway was blacktopped in 2019.

== Facilities ==
The airport is at an elevation of 5,238 feet (1,597 m) above mean sea level. It has one runway which is 630 metres (2,067 ft) in length.

== Airlines and destinations ==
Airlines	Destinations
Nepal Airlines	Kathmandu
