= Dubekol =

Village in Sagarmatha Zone, Nepal

Dubekol दुबेकोल Dube
- Village Development Committee
- Country: Nepal
- Zone: Sagarmatha Zone
- District: Khotang District

Population (1991)
  - Total: 1,890
- Time zone: UTC+5:45 (Nepal Time)

Dubekol is a village and Village Development Committee in Khotang District in the Sagarmatha Zone of eastern Nepal. At the time of the 1991 Nepal census it had a population of 1,890 persons living in 355 individual households.
