= Indrayani Pokhari =

Former Village Development Committee in Nepal

Indrayani Pokhari इन्द्रायणी पोखरी
- Village Development Committee
- Interactive map of Indrayani Pokhari
- Country: Nepal
- Zone: Sagarmatha Zone
- District: Khotang District

Population (1991)
  - Total: 3,589
- Time zone: UTC+5:45 (Nepal Time)

VDC Map of Khotang District

Indrayani Pokhari is a town and Village Development Committee in Khotang District in the Sagarmatha Zone of eastern Nepal. At the time of the 1991 Nepal census it had a population of 3,589 persons living in 697 individual households.
