= Durchhim =

Former Village Development Committee in Nepal

Durchhim दुर्छिम
- Village Development Committee
- Location in Nepal
- Coordinates: 27.17°N 86.59°E
- Country: Nepal
- Zone: Sagarmatha Zone
- District: Khotang District

Population (1991)
  - Total: 3,283
- Time zone: [[UTC+5:45[]] (Nepal Time)

Durchhim is a town and Village Development Committee in Khotang District in the Sagarmatha Zone of eastern Nepal. At the time of the 1991 Nepal census it had a population of 3,283 persons living in 629 individual households.
