= Patheka =

Patheka पाथेका
- Village Development Committee
- Location in Nepal
- Coordinates: 27.28°N 86.87°E
- Country: Nepal
- Zone: Sagarmatha Zone
- District: Khotang District

Population (1991)
  - Total: 4,135
- Time zone: UTC+5:45 (Nepal Time)

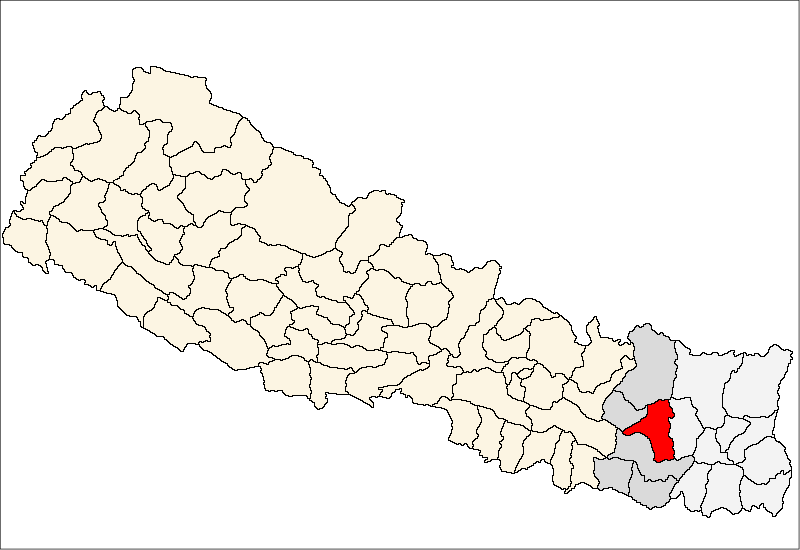
Map of Khotang District

Patheka is a town and Village Development Committee in Khotang District in the Sagarmatha Zone of eastern Nepal. At the time of the 1991 Nepal census it had a population of 4,135 persons living in 788 individual households.
