= Koi language =

Kiranti language spoken in Nepal

Koyee
- ᤁᤥᤕᤡ; कोयी
- Region: Nepal
- Ethnicity: Koyee/Koyu Rai
- Native speakers: 1,300 (2011 census)
- Language family: Sino-Tibetan: Tibeto-Burman; Mahakiranti (?); Kiranti; Western; Upper Dudhkosi; Koyee

Language codes
- ISO 639-3: kkt
- Glottolog: koii1238
- ELP: Koi

Koyee (कोयी) is a Sino-Tibetan language belonging to the Kiranti languages spoken in the Khotang district of Nepal. Like other Kiranti languages, it displays a fairly complex system of person-marking and stem alternations. The term "Koyee" has dual significance, describing both a language and a tribe. Its origins trace back to various sources. According to records from 2015 BS, the term could have been derived from "kuyama" (IPA- kujämä), words in the Koyee language that mean "dark." This might be connected to the location of Sungdel on the hill 'Lourya,' which seems to be dark. The people residing in this shadowy area came to be known as the Koyee tribe, and the language they spoke became known as Koyee language. Over time, phonological changes, such as the shift from "u" to "o(backness)" have contributed to the evolution of the term. Koyee people who settle down in easter side of Nepal are known as Koyu (कोयू).

Alternate spellings and names are Kohi, Koi B.ʌʔ’, Koyee, Koyi, Koyu.

== Geographical distribution ==
Koyee is spoken in Sungdel (near Rawakhola headwaters) and Dipsung VDC's, northeastern Khotang District, Koshi Province, Nepal (Ethnologue).

== Phonology ==
=== Vowels ===
Vowel phonemes
	Front		Back			
	unrounded		rounded		unrounded	
	short	long	short	long	short	long
High	i ᤀᤡ ⟨इ⟩	iː ᤀᤡ᤺	u ᤀᤢ ⟨उ⟩	uː ᤀᤢ᤺		
High-mid	e ᤀᤣ ⟨ए⟩	eː ᤀᤣ᤺	o ᤀᤥ ⟨ओ⟩	oː ᤀᤥ᤺		
Low-mid					ʌ ᤀ ⟨अ⟩	ʌː ᤀ᤺
Low					ä ᤀᤠ ⟨आ⟩	äː ᤀᤠ᤺

- While using Devanagari script long vowel is denoted by using /ः/ instead of using long diacritics (दीर्घ मात्रा) and to denote nasal sound / ँ/ is used.

=== Consonants ===
Koyee consonant phonemes
		Bilabial	Dental	Alveolar	Palatal	Velar	Glottal
Nasal		m ᤔ ⟨म⟩		n ᤏ ⟨न⟩		ŋ ᤅ ⟨ङ⟩	
Affricate	unaspirated	p ᤐ ⟨प⟩	t̪ ᤋ ⟨त⟩		t͡ʃ ᤆ ⟨च⟩	k ᤁ ⟨क⟩	ʔ ᤹ ⟨अ्⟩
Affricate	aspirated	pʰ ᤑ ⟨फ⟩	t̪ʰ ᤌ ⟨थ⟩		t͡ʃʰ ᤇ ⟨छ⟩	kʰ ᤂ ⟨ख⟩	
Affricate	unaspirated	b ᤒ ⟨ब⟩	d̪ ᤍ ⟨द⟩		d͡ʒ ᤈ ⟨ज⟩	ɡ ᤃ ⟨ग⟩	
Affricate	aspirated	bʱ ᤓ ⟨भ⟩	d̪ʱ ᤎ ⟨ध⟩	d͡ʒʱ ᤉ ⟨झ⟩		ɡʱ ᤄ ⟨घ⟩	
Fricative				s ᤛ ⟨स⟩			ɦ ᤜ ⟨ह⟩
Trill				r ᤖ ⟨र⟩			
Lateral				l ᤗ ⟨ल⟩			
Frictionless continuant		w ᤘ ⟨व⟩			j ᤕ ⟨य⟩		

- Glottal stop [ʔ] is one of the consonants of Koyu/Koyee(Koi) language which is represent by using ⟨अ्⟩.
- To write Koyu/Koyee language Devanagari lipi or Kirat Sirijunga lipi is used.

== Bibliography ==
- Lahaussois, Aimée. 2009. 'Koyi Rai: An Initial Grammatical Sketch.' Himalayan Linguistics Archive 4. 1-33.
- http://lacito.vjf.cnrs.fr/archivage/languages/Koyi_Rai.htm
- Rai, Tara Mani.2022. A Grammar of Koyee, LINCOM EUROPA.
- Rai, Tara Mani.2015. A Grammar of Koyee. A PhD dissertation submitted to Tribhuvan University, Nepal.
- Rai, Tara Mani and Omkareshor Shrestha.2014. http://cdltu.edu.np/site/images/linsun/koyee.pdf
- Rai, Tara Mani.2012. Nepalese Linguistics - Table of Contents - Digital Himalayahttp://www.digitalhimalaya.com › nepling › nepling_toc
