= Bahunidanda =

Former Village Development Committee in Nepal

Bahunidanda बाहुनीडाँडा
- Neighborhood
- Location in province Bahunidanda (Nepal)
- Coordinates: 27.16°N 86.46°E
- Country: Nepal
- Province: Pradesh Ek
- District: Khotang District
- Municipal area: Halesi Tuwachung
- Ward: Ward No. 1

Population (1991)
  - Total: 2,365
- Time zone: UTC+5:45 (Nepal Time)

Bahunidanda is a town (previously a village development committee) in Halesi Tuwachung municipal area in Khotang District of Province No. 1 of eastern Nepal. At the time of the 1991 Nepal census it had a population of 2,365 persons living in 401 individual households.

Bahunidanda was incorporated with Halesi Tuwachung in 2017 when the government of Nepal decided to restructure to the old local level body.
