= Salle, Nepal =

Salle, Nepal सल्ले
- Haleshi Tuwachung Municipality Ward No.9
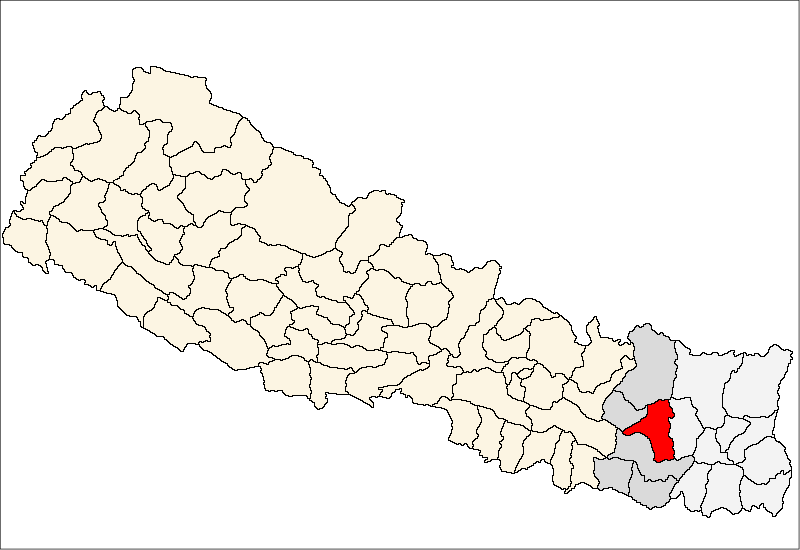
- Location of the Khotang district, Nepal

- Location in Nepal
- Coordinates: 27.23°N 86.63°E
- Country: Nepal
- Zone: Sagarmatha Zone
- District: Khotang District

Population (1195)
  - Total: 1,195
- Time zone: UTC+5:45 (Nepal Time)

Salle is a village and Haleshi Tuwachung Municipality Ward No.9 (Nepal) in Khotang District in the Sagarmatha Zone of eastern Nepal. At the time of the 1991 Nepal census it had a population of 1,931 persons living in 357 individual households.
