= Kharmi =

Kharmi खार्मी
- Village Development Committee
- Location in Nepal
- Coordinates: 27.29°N 86.81°E
- Country: Nepal
- Zone: Sagarmatha Zone
- District: Khotang District

Population (1991)
  - Total: 3,807
- Time zone: UTC+5:45 (Nepal Time)

Kharmi is a town and Village Development Committee in Khotang District in the Sagarmatha Zone of eastern Nepal. At the time of the 1991 Nepal census it had a population of 3,807 persons living in 723 individual households.

Kharmi is located at two hours walk from Diktel, headquarters of Khotang District. Surrounded by Patheka, Jalpa, Nerpa and Baksila, this village split into nine wards geographically and stretches from Tapkhola at the bottom to Rupakot at the top. Tapkhola is the main river dividing the Kharmi from Baksila and is popular in fishing in the region. Due to the topographical variation, the temperature varies widely in Kharmi from snowfall in winter at Rupakot to the temperate weather near the Tapkhola region at all seasons.

Many primary and pre-secondary schools are located at various wards and one secondary school - Kalika Secondary perched at the center of the village to meet the need of the education. A road network already reached to Kharbari, easily accessible in an hour walk from other wards. Most of the wards have electricity access from Tapkhola Hydro-electric project operated in community based scheme. A health post with a health assistant in the village serves the primary health care to the people. Wireless communication network such as cdma and cell-phone are available throughout the wards. Two or three houses share the running water for drinking and washing purpose.

The natural resources of Kharmi is water and forest. A number of streams run within the village that are helping to generate power from the micro-hydro for the public, and to irrigate the crops. Beside this, enormous biomass resource provide feeding to the animal and energy demand in the house for example cooking and heating. In addition, agricultural yield compares to other village and now the cash-crop such as Alainchi, Chiraito and turmeric powder are main economic sources of the people. In this way, the large chunk of economy is driven by the agricultural yield and few is supported by the people who serve in the foreign country.

The population consists of mainly Rai, Tamang, Newar and Chhetri. A good cultural and religious harmony can be seen among the people from various ethnicity. The main festival observed in Kharmi is Sakela, a major festival of Kirant Rai. People from other villages also come to celebrate the festival at Turkha, the 9th ward of Kharmi. Basically Kirant Rai worship and believe in nature and so is a form - Sakela.
