= Khartamchha =

Former Village Development Committee in Nepal

Coordinates: 27°19′N 86°53′E

Khartamchha खार्तम्छा
- Village Development Committee
- Interactive map of Khartamchha
- Country: Nepal
- Zone: Sagarmatha
- District: Khotang

Population (1991)
  - Total: 2,387
- Time zone: UTC+5:45 (Nepal Time)

VDC Map of Khotang District

Khartamchha is a village and Village Development Committee in Khotang District in the Sagarmatha Zone of eastern Nepal. At the time of the 1991 Nepal census it had a population of 2,387 persons living in 497 individual households.
