= Santeshwar Chhitapokhari =

Santeshwar Chhitapokhari सान्तेश्वर छितापोखरी
- Village Development Committee
- Country: Nepal
- Zone: Sagarmatha Zone
- District: Khotang District

Population (1991)
  - Total: 2,832
- Time zone: UTC+5:45 (Nepal Time)
- Postal code: 56210
- Area code: 036

Santeshwar Chhitapokhari is a village and Village Development Committee in Khotang District in the Sagarmatha Zone of eastern Nepal. At the time of the 1991 Nepal census it had a population of 2,832 persons living in 495 individual households.
