= Woplukha =

Woplukha वोप्लुखोला
- Village Development Committee
- Location in Nepal
- Coordinates: 27.09°N 86.90°E
- Country: Nepal
- Zone: Sagarmatha Zone
- District: Khotang District

Population (1991)
  - Total: 2,571
- Time zone: UTC+5:45 (Nepal Time)

Waplukha is a Village Development Committee in Khotang District in the Sagarmatha Zone of eastern Nepal. At the time of the 1991 Nepal census it had a population of 2,571 persons living in 484 individual households.
