= Simpani, Khotang =

Simpani सिम्पानी
- rural municipality
- Seal

- Location in Nepal
- Coordinates: 27.04°N 86.81°E
- Country: Nepal
- Zone: Sagarmatha Zone
- District: Khotang District

Government
  - Type: Mayor
  - Ward chairman: Chandra Bahadur Thapa

Population (2008)
  - Total: 5,713
- Time zone: UTC+5:45 (Nepal Time)
- Postal code: 56214

Simpani is a village town and Former village development committee in Khotehang gaupalika in the Sagarmatha Zone of eastern state 1.Nepal. At the time of the 1991 Nepal census it had a population of 3,597 persons living in 676 individual households. According to Simpani VDC record in 2008, its total population is 5713.
