= Chhitapokhari =

Former Village Development Committee in Nepal

Chhitapokhari छितापोखरी
- Village Development Committee
- Location in Nepal
- Coordinates: 27.12°N 86.86°E
- Country: Nepal
- Zone: Sagarmatha Zone
- District: Khotang District

Population (1991)
  - Total: 2,314
- Time zone: UTC+5:45 (Nepal Time)

Chhitapokhari is a village and Village Development Committee in Khotang District in the Sagarmatha Zone of eastern Nepal. At the time of the 1991 Nepal census it had a population of 2,314 persons living in 406 individual households.
