= Ratancha Majhagaun =

Ratancha Majhagaun रतन्छा माझगाउँ
- Village Development Committee
- Location in Nepal
- Coordinates: 27.18°N 86.87°E
- Country: Nepal
- Zone: Sagarmatha Zone
- District: Khotang District

Population (1991)
  - Total: 3,176
- Time zone: UTC+5:45 (Nepal Time)

Ratancha Majhagaun is a town and Village Development Committee in Khotang District in the Sagarmatha Zone of eastern Nepal. At the time of the 1991 Nepal census it had a population of 3,176 persons living in 591 individual households.
