= Ribdung Jaleshwari =

Ribdung Jaleshwari रिब्दुङ जलेश्वरी
- Village Development Committee
- Location in Nepal
- Country: Nepal
- Zone: Sagarmatha Zone
- District: Khotang District

Population (1991)
  - Total: 2,039
- Time zone: UTC+5:45 (Nepal Time)

Ribdung Jaleshwari is a village and Village Development Committee in Khotang District in the Sagarmatha Zone of eastern Nepal. At the time of the 1991 Nepal census it had a population of 2,039 persons living in 416 individual households.
