= Baspani, Khotang District =

Former Village Development Committee in Nepal

Baspani बास्पानी
- Village Development Committee
- Location in Nepal
- Coordinates: 27.31°N 86.85°E
- Country: Nepal
- Zone: Sagarmatha Zone
- District: Khotang District

Population (1991)
  - Total: 2,019
- Time zone: UTC+5:45 (Nepal Time)

Baspani is a village and Village Development Committee in Khotang District in the Sagarmatha Zone of eastern Nepal. At the time of the 1991 Nepal census it had a population of 2,019 people living in 410 individual households.
