= Ainselu Kharka =

Former Village Development Committee in Nepal

Aiselukharka ऐसेलुखर्क
- Village Development Committee
- Location in Nepal
- Coordinates: 27.10°N 86.29°E
- Country: Nepal
- Zone: Sagarmatha Zone
- District: Khotang District

Population (1991)
  - Total: 1,554
- Time zone: UTC+5:45 (Nepal Time)
- Postal code: 56202
- Area code: 036

Aiselukharka is a town and Village Development Committee in Khotang District in the Sagarmatha Zone of eastern Nepal. At the time of the 1991 Nepal census it had a population of 3,617 persons living in 676 individual households.
