= Rajapani =

Rajapani राजापानी
- Village Development Committee
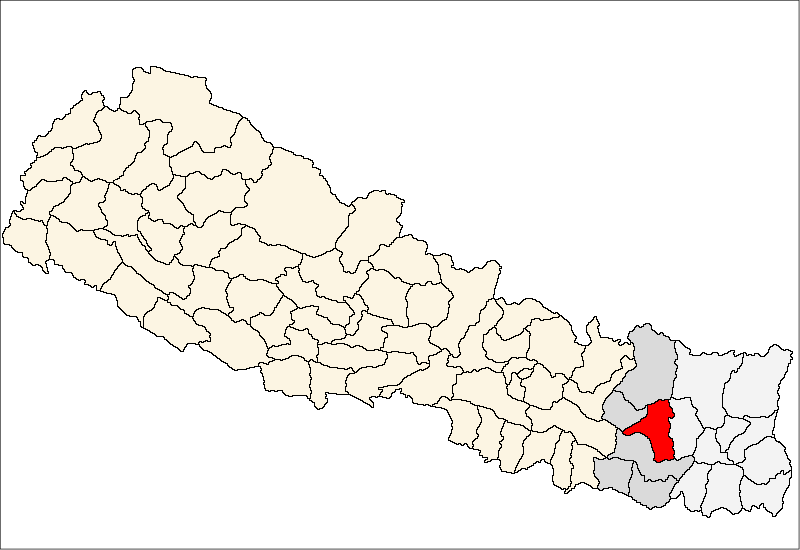
- Khotang district

- Location in Nepal
- Coordinates: 27.14°N 86.72°E
- Country: Nepal
- Zone: Sagarmatha Zone
- District: Khotang District

Population (1991)
  - Total: 3,444
- Time zone: UTC+5:45 (Nepal Time)

Rajapani is a town and Village Development Committee in Khotang District in the Sagarmatha Zone of eastern Nepal.

As of the 1991 Nepal census it had a population of 3,444 people living in 622 households.

Rajapani lies is in Halesi Municipality-11. Halesi Mahadev temple is a pilgrimage site for Hindus and is the pashupati of Eastern Nepal.

Rajapani is named for its pure water. Rajapani is known for oranges, its productive lands and its cultural diversity. Castes include Brahmins, Chhetri, Rai, Magar, Majhi, Bishokarma, Pariyar, and Newar.
