= Pauwasera =

Pauwasera पौवासेरा
- Village Development Committee
- Location in Nepal
- Coordinates: 26.91°N 86.88°E
- Country: Nepal
- Zone: Sagarmatha Zone
- District: Khotang District

Population (1991)
  - Total: 1,962
- Time zone: UTC+5:45 (Nepal Time)

Pauwasera is a village and Village Development Committee in Khotang District in the Sagarmatha Zone of eastern Nepal. At the time of the 1991 Nepal census it had a population of 1,962 persons living in 315 individual households.
