= Mattim Birta =

Former Village Development Committee in Nepal

Mattim Birta मात्तिमबिर्ता
- Village Development Committee
- Location in Nepal
- Coordinates: 27°09′43″N 86°49′59″E
- Country: Nepal
- Zone: Sagarmatha Zone
- District: Khotang District

Population (1991)
  - Total: 5,021
- Time zone: UTC+5:45 (Nepal Time)

Mattim Birta is a town and Village Development Committee in Khotang District in the Sagarmatha Zone of eastern Nepal. At the time of the 1991 Nepal census it had a population of 5,021 persons residing in 899 individual households.
