= Jyamire, Khotang =

Former Village Development Committee in Nepal

Jyamire, Sagarmatha ज्यामिरे
- Village Development Committee
- Country: Nepal
- Zone: Sagarmatha Zone
- District: Khotang District

Population (1991)
  - Total: 1,579
- Time zone: UTC+5:45 (Nepal Time)

Jyamire is a village and Village Development Committee in Khotang District in the Sagarmatha Zone of eastern Nepal. At the time of the 1991 Nepal census it had a population of 1,579 persons living in 298 individual households.
