= Badka Dipali =

Former Village Development Committee in Nepal

Badkadiyale बड्कादीयाले
- Village Development Committee
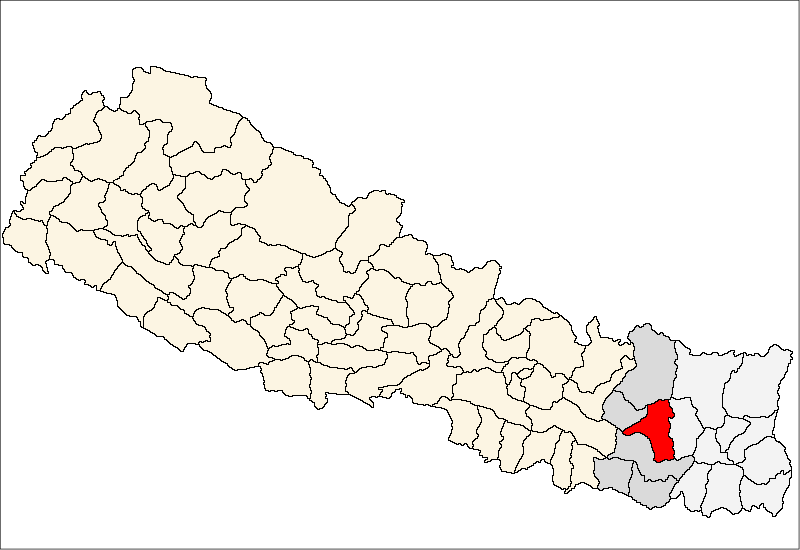
- Location of the Khotang district
- Interactive map of Badkadiyale
- Country: Nepal
- Zone: Sagarmatha Zone
- District: Khotang District

Population (1991)
  - Total: 2,632
- Time zone: UTC+5:45 (Nepal Time)

Badka Dipali is a village and Village Development Committee in Khotang District in the Sagarmatha Zone of eastern Nepal. At the time of the 1991 Nepal census it had a population of 2,632 persons living in 508 individual households.
