= Linkuwa Pokhari =

Former Village Development Committee in Nepal

Linkuwa Pokhari लिकुवापोखरी
- Village Development Committee
- Country: Nepal
- Zone: Sagarmatha Zone
- District: Khotang District

Population (1991)
  - Total: 2,655
- Time zone: UTC+5:45 (Nepal Time)

Linkuwa Pokhari is a village and Village Development Committee in Khotang District in the Sagarmatha Zone of eastern Nepal. At the time of the 1991 Nepal census it had a population of 2,655 persons living in 516 individual households.
