= Dandagaun, Khotang =

Former Village Development Committee in Nepal

Dandagaun, Sagarmatha डाँडागाउँ
- Village Development Committee
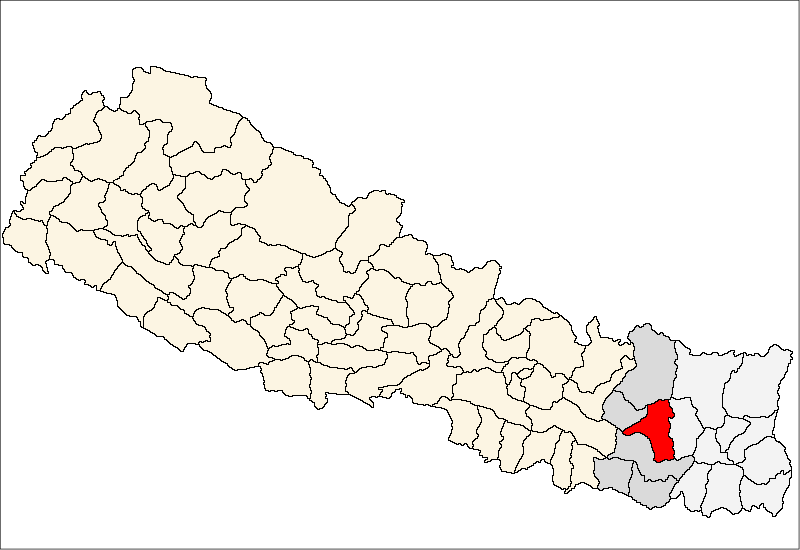
- Country: Nepal
- Zone: Sagarmatha Zone
- District: Khotang District

Population (1991)
  - Total: 2,903
- Time zone: UTC+5:45 (Nepal Time)

Dandagaun is a village and Village Development Committee in Khotang District in the Sagarmatha Zone of eastern Nepal. At the time of the 1991 Nepal census it had a population of 2,903 persons living in 528 individual households.
