= Khidima =

Former Village Development Committee in Nepal

Khidima खिदिमा
- Village Development Committee
- Location in Nepal
- Coordinates: 27.15°N 86.91°E
- Country: Nepal
- Zone: Sagarmatha Zone
- District: Khotang District

Population (1991)
  - Total: 2,349
- Time zone: UTC+5:45 (Nepal Time)

Khidima is a village and Village Development Committee in Khotang District in the Sagarmatha Zone of eastern Nepal. At the time of the 1991 Nepal census it had a population of 2,349 people living in 415 individual households.
