= Chipring =

Former Village Development Committee in Nepal

Chipring चिप्रीङ
- Village Development Committee
- Location in Nepal
- Coordinates: 27.08°N 86.84°E
- Country: Nepal
- Zone: Sagarmatha Zone
- District: Khotang District

Population (1991)
  - Total: 1,331
- Time zone: UTC+5:45 (Nepal Time)

Chipring is a village and Village Development Committee in Khotang District in the Sagarmatha Zone of eastern Nepal. At the time of the 1991 Nepal census it had a population of 1,331 persons living in 263 individual households.
