= Sawakatahare =

Sawakatahare सावाकटहरे
- Village Development Committee
- Location in Nepal
- Coordinates: 27.06°N 86.90°E
- Country: Nepal
- Zone: Sagarmatha Zone
- District: Khotang District

Population (1991)
  - Total: 3,052
- Time zone: UTC+5:45 (Nepal Time)

Map of Khotang District villages

Sawakatahare is a village and Village Development Committee in Khotang District in the Sagarmatha Zone of eastern Nepal. At the time of the 1991 Nepal census it had a population of 3,052 persons living in 585 individual households.
