= Lichki Ramche =

Former Village Development Committee in Nepal

Coordinates: 26°59′N 86°46′E

Lichki Ramche लिच्कीराम्चे
- Village Development Committee
- Interactive map of Lichki Ramche
- Country: Nepal
- Zone: Sagarmatha Zone
- District: Khotang District

Population (1991)
  - Total: 3,363
- Time zone: UTC+5:45 (Nepal Time)

Lichki Ramche is a village and Village Development Committee in Khotang District in the Sagarmatha Zone of eastern Nepal. At the time of the 1991 Nepal census it had a population of 3,363 persons living in 606 individual households.
