= Chhorambu =

Former Village Development Committee in Nepal

Chhorambu छोरम्बु
- Village Development Committee
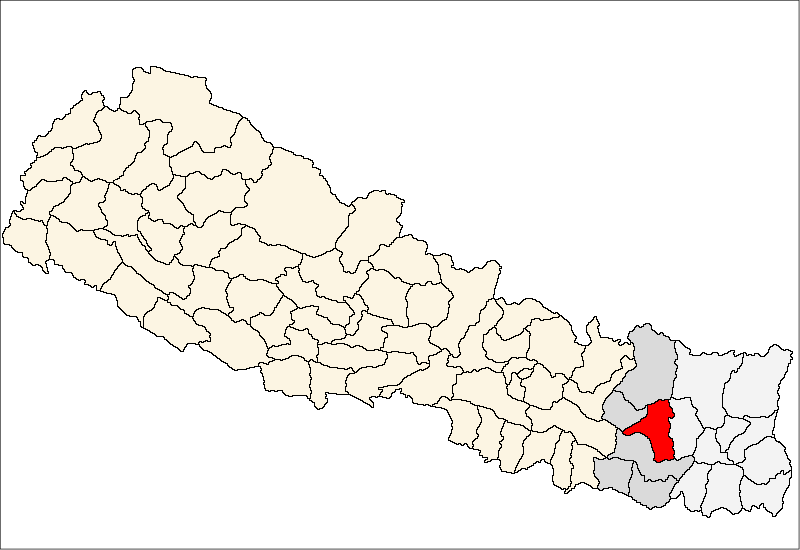
- Location of Khotang District within Nepal

- Location in Nepal
- Coordinates: 27.10°N 86.76°E
- Country: Nepal
- Zone: Sagarmatha Zone
- District: Khotang District

Population (1991)
  - Total: 2,376
- Time zone: UTC+5:45 (Nepal Time)

Chhorambu is a village and Village Development Committee in Khotang District in the Sagarmatha Zone of eastern Nepal. At the time of the 1991 Nepal census it had a population of 2,376 persons living in 428 individual households.
