= Baksila =

Former Village Development Committee in Nepal

Baksila बाक्सिला
- Village Development Committee
- Location in Nepal
- Coordinates: 27.33°N 86.83°E
- Country: Nepal
- Zone: Sagarmatha Zone
- District: Khotang District

Population (1991)
  - Total: 3,996
- Time zone: UTC+5:45 (Nepal Time)
- Area code: 036

Baksila is a village and village development committee in Khotang District in the Sagarmatha Zone of eastern Nepal. At the time of the 1991 Nepal census it had a population of 3,996 persons living in 796 individual households. Baksila is a five hours walk from Diktel, headquarters of Khotang District. Surrounded by Baspani, Sungdel, Dipsung, Rakha Saptewor and Kharmi, the village is split into nine wards geographically. It became the headquarters of Kepilasgadhi rural municipality after the local level division in line with the constitution and local level election. It is ward number 4 of Kepilasgadhi RM and Ganesh Bahadur Adhikari is the chairperson of ward. Shree Prithvi Higher Secondary School, Local Buddha Bajar, Kepilasgadhi, etc. are the main places/offices.
