= Sampang language =

Central Kiranti language subgroup

Sampang
- Region: Nepal
- Ethnicity: Khambu Sampang Rai
- Native speakers: 18,300 (2011 census)
- Language family: Sino-Tibetan: Tibeto-Burman; Mahakiranti (?); Kiranti languages; Central; Khambu Rai; Sampang

Language codes
- ISO 639-3: rav
- Glottolog: samp1249
- ELP: Sampang

Sampang language is a subgroup of Central Kiranti languages

== Geographical distribution ==
Sampang is spoken in the following locations of Nepal (Ethnologue).

- Khotang District, Koshi Province (Khotang dialect): Tap Khola river villages, Baspani, Khartamcha, Phedi, and Patheka
- Bhojpur District, Koshi Province: in Okharbote around the Lahure Khola river headwaters
- Syam Khola area: Kimalung, Nigale, Talakharka, and Surke
- Dingla Bazaar: a few elderly speakers use the Phali dialect in Bhojpur District, Koshi Province

== Vocabulary ==
cha	food, rice
khae	curry
Mina	people
fupa	grandfather
muma	grandmother
Appa	Father
Aamma	mother
Nana	elder sister
Nichama	little sister
nini	Aunt elder to dad
dipa	Uncle Elder to Dad
babbaw	Uncle younger to Dad
bubu	Elder Brother
Nucha	Younger Brother
solti	sibling's partner's brother
soltini	sibling's partner's sister
bhadai/bhaidini	Brothers children Son/ Daughter
kwopa	Mother's Brother
Rwa	money
tey	cloths
kawa	water
mi	fire
?	Cup
khwabulo	flour
Lungchha	Millet
Khamawa	locally brew wine
saa	meat

== The different branch of Sampang people ==
1. Chetapi Namrewa Sampang
2. Tomiha Sampang
3. Rana Sampang
4. Samaru Sampang
5. Bhalu Sampang
6. Wakchalee Sampang
7. Repsona Sampang
8. Rangkham Sampang
9. Rodu Sampang
10. Herang Sampang
11. Maremlung Sampang
12. Damrewa Sampang
13. Bali Sampang
14. Samring Sampang
15. Toriha Sampang
16. Tamahchha Sampang
17. Dungribung Sampang
