= Magpa =

Former Village Development Committee in Nepal

Makpa माक्पा
- Village Development Committee
- Location in Nepal
- Coordinates: 27.34°N 86.76°E
- Country: Nepal
- Zone: Sagarmatha Zone
- District: Khotang District

Population (1991)
  - Total: 2,238
- Time zone: UTC+5:45 (Nepal Time)

Makpa is a village and Village Development Committee in Khotang District in the Sagarmatha Zone of eastern Nepal. At the time of the 1991 Nepal census it had a population of 2,238.
