= Chamling language =

Language in Nepal, Bhutan and India

Chamling
- चाम्लिङ
- The word "Chamling" written in Devanagari script
- Native to: Nepal; India (Sikkim, Darjeeling, Kalimpong); Bhutan (southern areas)
- Ethnicity: Rodung Chamling
- Native speakers: 77,000 in Nepal (2011)
- Language family: Sino-Tibetan: Tibeto-Burman; Mahakiranti (?); Kiranti; Central Kiranti; Southern; Chamling
- Writing system: Devanagari

Language codes
- ISO 639-3: rab
- Glottolog: caml1239
- ELP: Camling

Chamling is one of the Kirati languages spoken by the Chamling people, a subgroup of the Kirat (Horsungchha, Dikhalichha, Terahachha, Mulihachha, Ditumachha, Mansungcha, Lipuhochha, Malekungchha, Maidhung, Kherasung, Rakhomi, Bhijaichha, Hodorichha, Yayochha, Pitruchha etc) of Nepal, India and Bhutan. Alternate renderings and names include Chamling, Chamlinge and Rodong. It is closely related to the Bantawa (some Bantawa-speaking communities call their language "Camling") and Puma languages of the Kiranti language family in eastern Nepal, and it belongs to the broader Sino-Tibetan language family. Chamling has SOV word order.

== History ==
The Chamling language is one of the languages of the ancient Kiranti culture, which existed well before vedic period 3500–5000 in South Asia. Important versions of the Mundum — the main religious text forming the religious foundation of the Kirant Mundum religion and the cultural heritage of the various Kirati people — are composed in Chamling; such versions are distinctive to the Camling-speaking tribes and a guide to their distinctive religious practices and cultural identity.

== Distribution ==
The Chamling language is used by small communities in eastern Sagarmatha Zone, in central Khotang District, Bhojpur District and scattered areas in northern Udayapur District and a few more districts of eastern Nepal, the southeastern neighbour Indian state of Sikkim, the hill city of Darjeeling, Kalimpong in the Indian state of West Bengal and the kingdom of Bhutan.

== Demographics ==
Despite its geographic prevalence, the actual number of Chamling speakers is estimated to be 10,000, spread across small tribes and villages. Many members of the Chamling ethnic and tribal communities are no longer fluent in the Chamling language, which is taught only in remote areas in the Udayapur District. Like Bantawa, Chamling is an endangered language. Many people in these areas speak a variety of Chamling that is mixed with the Nepali language, which is the official language of Nepal. Most Chamling-speaking people are Hindus or practitioners of Kiranti Mundum.

== Phonology ==
=== Consonants ===
		Labial	Dental	Alveolar	Dorsal	Glottal
Nasal	voiced	m	n		ŋ	
Nasal	voiced aspirated	mʱ	nʱ			
Plosive/ Affricate	voiceless	p	t	ts	k	
Plosive/ Affricate	voiceless aspirated	pʰ	tʰ	tsʰ	kʰ	
Plosive/ Affricate	voiced	b	d	(dz)	(ɡ)	
Plosive/ Affricate	voiced aspirated	bʱ	dʱ	(dzʱ)	(ɡʱ)	
Rhotic			r rʱ			
Fricative		f	s			h
Approximant		w	l lʱ		j	

=== Vowels ===
	front	central	back
high	i		u
mid	e	(ə)	o
low		a	(ɒ)

- Voice
1. Phuima = pluck
2. Toma = see, experience
3. Ityu = brought from above
4. Dhotyu-cyu = assembled them
5. Bhuima = pound
6. Doma = close
7. Idyu = gave him
8. Dhodyu-cyu = stabbed them

== Bound Morphemes ==
	chamling	example word	morphological rule
plural suffix	/-ci/	"challa-ci" = my brothers	N —> N + plural /-ci/
"his"	/m-/	"m-tõ" = his ha1. ir	N —> /m/ + N
"my"	/a-/	"a-nicho" = my sibling	N —> /a/ + N
"your"	/kap-/	"kap-tõ" = your hair	N —> /kap/ + N

Chamling uses many bound morphemes, many of which denote possession or the change of possession of something.

== Phrase Structure Rules ==
NP —> (D) N
VP —> (NP) (A) (Adv) V (Adv)
CP —> C S
S —> NP {VP, NP, CP}

anga a-khim hinge
my {my house} be
D N V
"I have a house"

This is 3. an example of a sentence that is formed by an NP and a VP. The NP contains a determiner and a noun, and the VP contains a verb.

a-challa-ci oda paina
{my brothers} here not
N V Adverb
"my brothers are not here"

This is an example of a sentence that is formed by a NP and a VP. The NP contains a noun and a VP contains a verb and an adverb.

khamo nung de?
your name what
D N N
"what is your name?"

This is an example of two NP's forming a sentence. One NP contains "khamo nung" ("your name") and the second NP contains "de" ("what").

== See also ==
- Languages of Nepal
- Languages of Bhutan
