= Damarkhu Shivalaya =

Former Village Development Committee in Nepal

Coordinates: 26°59′N 86°58′E

Damarkhu Shivalaya डम्बर्खुशिवालय
- Village Development Committee
- Interactive map of Damarkhu Shivalaya
- Country: Nepal
- Zone: Sagarmatha Zone
- District: Khotang District

Population (1991)
  - Total: 3,237
- Time zone: UTC+5:45 (Nepal Time)

Damarkhu Shivalaya is a town and Village Development Committee in Khotang District in the Sagarmatha Zone of eastern Nepal. At the time of the 1991 Nepal census it had a population of 3,237 persons living in 602 individual households.
