= Nachhiring language =

Kiranti language spoken in Nepal

Nachhiring
- Nachering
- Pronunciation: [naʨhiɾiŋ]
- Native to: Nepal
- Region: Rakha Bangdel, Badel, para, Khotang District, Koshi Province
- Ethnicity: Kirat Nachhiring
- Native speakers: <140 (2018)
- Language family: Sino-Tibetan: Tibeto-Burman; Kiranti; Central; Khambu; Nachhiring

Language codes
- ISO 639-3: ncd
- Glottolog: nach1240
- ELP: Nachering

Nachhiring (Nachering pronunciation: [naʨhiɾiŋ]) is a Kirati language spoken mostly in the eastern hills of Nepal, though only used for communication in three villages. It is considered moribund, with no greater than 140 fluent speakers, and all fluent speakers are older than 50 as of 2018. The Nachhiring people speak mostly Nepali for communication.

== Names ==
The name can also be spelled Nachering, Nachhereng, Nacchhering, Nasring "Bangdel". "Bangdale" is a tribal name. Ethnologue lists the alternate names Bangdale, Bangdel Tûm, Bangdile, Mathsereng, Nacchhering, Nacering Ra, Nachering Tûm, Nachiring, Nasring, Nasru Bhra.

== Geographical distribution ==
Nachering is spoken in the following locations of Nepal.

- Upper northeastern Khotang District, Koshi Province (in the Lidim Khola river slopes area near Rawakhola valley, headwaters and tributaries to southern Aiselukharke): Rakha, Bangdel, Dipsun, Para, Badel, Patel, Bakachol, and Aiselukharka VDC's
- Solukhumbu District: Waddu and Sotang VDC's

Grollmann (2018:2) reports that Nachiring is spoken in the villages of Aiselukharka, Hume, Para, Bakachol, Badel, Bangdel, Rakha, and Sumtel. It is not spoken anymore by ethnic Nachiring people living in Dharapani, Dipsun, and Dimma villages. It is only used for communication in Badel, Rakha, and Bangdel.

== Status ==
According to Grollmann, the Ethnologue reports that Nachhiring language retention is limited and that nepalization is rather widespread. Many Nachhiring people identify strongly with the identity without speaking the Nachhiring language. A 1991 estimate put the number of Nachhiring speakers at no greater than 2,000; at that time, even in the villages where Nachhiring was regularly spoken, children only acquired it to a limited extent. No more than 140 fluent speakers remain as of 2018. All active and fluent speakers of Nachhiring are older than 50, if not 60, though not all in this age range are fluent, people between 15 and 50 years old may only know Nachhiring passively, and no one younger than 15 knows any Nachhiring at all, or learns it. Young parents do not have sufficient proficiency to teach their children Nachhiring. Nepali has completely supplanted Nachhiring as the primary language of communication.

== Phonology ==
=== Consonants ===
Stops in Nachhiring are articulated at bilabial, dental, and velar points of articulation. Unlike the related Kulung language, Nachhiring distinguishes voiced aspirated stops from non-aspirated ones. The only fricatives in both Nachhiring and Kulung are alveolar /s/ and glottal /h/ or /ɦ/, though Nachhiring also has a likely non-phonemic alternation between [s] and [ɕ]. Four glides are found in both languages, /w, l, j, ɾ/.

=== Vowels ===
Nachhiring has seven vowels, /i/, /e/, /a/, /u/, /o/, /ə/, /ɯ/. /a/ is articulated "extremely fronted". /ə/ is realized as phonetically between [ɔ] and [ə].
