= Dipsung =

Village in Nepal

Dipsung दिप्सुङ Rakha Dipsung
- Village Development Committee
- Nickname: Dipsung
- Motto: "Catch hands by hands to get bigger"
- Rakha Dipsung: Nepal
- Zone: Sagarmatha Zone
- District: Khotang District

Population (1991)
  - Total: 950
- Time zone: UTC+5:45 (Nepal Time)
- Area code: 036

Dipsung is a village and Village Development Committee in Khotang District in the Sagarmatha Zone of eastern Nepal. At the time of the 1991 Nepal census, it had a population of 950 living in 205 individual households.

People here are engaged mainly in agriculture and animal husbandry. It has a popular hydropower project: the Rawa Hydropower Project. It is composed of 9 wards. A only school, Shree Renuka Nimna Madhyamik Bidhyalaya gives education to almost 9 ward's Students, and is managed by the coordinator Mr. Manoj Timsina.
