= Chisapani, Khotang =

Former Village Development Committee in Nepal

Chisapani, Khotang चिसापानी
- Village Development Committee
- Location in Nepal
- Coordinates: 26°58′N 86°53′E
- Country: Nepal
- Zone: Sagarmatha Zone
- District: Khotang District
- Elevation: 200 m (660 ft)

Population (1991)
  - Total: 4,276
- Time zone: UTC+5:45 (Nepal Time)
- Postal code: 56212
- Area code: 036

Chisapani is a town and Village Development Committee in Khotang District in the Sagarmatha Zone of eastern Nepal. At the time of the 1991 Nepal census it had a population of 4,276 persons living in 791 individual households.
