= Diplung =

Former Village Development Committee in Nepal

Diplung दिप्लुङ
- Village Development Committee
- Location in Nepal
- Coordinates: 26.98°N 86.86°E
- Country: Nepal
- Zone: Sagarmatha Zone
- District: Khotang District

Population (1991)
  - Total: 2,063
- Time zone: UTC+5:45 (Nepal Time)

Diplung is a village and Village Development Committee in Khotang District in the Sagarmatha Zone of eastern Nepal. At the time of the 1991 Nepal census it had a population of 2,063 persons living in 399 individual households.
