= Sungdel =

Sungdel सुङ्देल
- Village Development Committee
- Location in Nepal
- Coordinates: 27.38°N 86.89°E
- Country: Nepal
- Zone: Sagarmatha Zone
- District: Khotang District CPN[maoist], CPN[UML], Nepali congress, khanbuwan morcha etc

Government

Population (1991)
  - Total: 2,846
- Time zone: UTC+5:45 (Nepal Time)
- Area code: 036

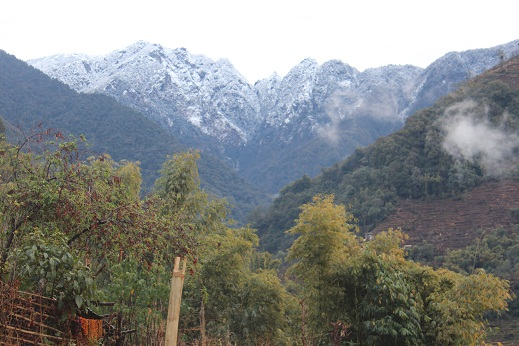

Sungdel is a village and Village Development Committee in the Khotang District in the Sagarmatha Zone of eastern Nepal. At the time of the 1991 Nepal census it had a population of 2,846 persons living in 585 individual households. It is at the northeast belt of the Khotang district. Currently, there is a high school, Shree surya Ma. Vi, and four primary schools. People run their own hydropower. The majority of people are Koyee Rai. It is the only place where Koyee people speak their mother language, Koyee. This language is also known as Sungdele Bhasa. Most people depend on farming. The highest hill in Khotang district, Loure, is situated in Sungdel.
