= Khotang Bazar =

Former Village Development Committee in Nepal

Khotang Bazar खोटाङ बजार
- Village Development Committee
- Interactive map of Khotang Bazar
- Country: Nepal
- Zone: Sagarmatha Zone
- District: Khotang District

Population (1991)
  - Total: 2,433
- Time zone: UTC+5:45 (Nepal Time)
- Postal code: 56211
- Area code: 036

Khotang Bazar is a village and Village Development Committee in Khotang District in Province No. 1 in eastern Nepal. At the time of the 1991 Nepal census, it had a population of 2,433 persons living in 458 individual households.

== Climate ==
Climate data for Khotang Bazar, elevation 1,295 m (4,249 ft)
Month	Jan	Feb	Mar	Apr	May	Jun	Jul	Aug	Sep	Oct	Nov	Dec	Year
Mean daily maximum °C (°F)	16.8 (62.2)	18.9 (66.0)	24.1 (75.4)	26.5 (79.7)	26.8 (80.2)	27.1 (80.8)	26.4 (79.5)	26.3 (79.3)	25.6 (78.1)	24.9 (76.8)	21.9 (71.4)	18.3 (64.9)	23.6 (74.5)
Mean daily minimum °C (°F)	3.8 (38.8)	5.3 (41.5)	9.1 (48.4)	13.6 (56.5)	16.3 (61.3)	18.7 (65.7)	19.2 (66.6)	18.8 (65.8)	17.6 (63.7)	14.7 (58.5)	8.6 (47.5)	4.6 (40.3)	12.5 (54.5)
Average precipitation mm (inches)	16.6 (0.65)	12.3 (0.48)	29.1 (1.15)	42.6 (1.68)	111.6 (4.39)	201.8 (7.94)	332.2 (13.08)	237.6 (9.35)	159.3 (6.27)	49.4 (1.94)	6.4 (0.25)	9.1 (0.36)	1,208 (47.54)
Source 1: Australian National University
Source 2: Japan International Cooperation Agency (precipitation)
