= Thulung language =

Sino-Tibetan language of Nepal and India

Thulung
- थुलुङ
- Region: Nepal, India
- Native speakers: 21,000 (2011)
- Language family: Sino-Tibetan: Tibeto-Burman; Kiranti; Western; Midwestern; Thulung

Language codes
- ISO 639-3: tdh
- Glottolog: thul1246
- ELP: Thulung
- Thulung is classified as Definitely Endangered by the UNESCO Atlas of the World's Languages in Danger.

Thulung or Thulung lwa (थुलुङ ल्वा) is a Sino-Tibetan Kirati language spoken in parts of Nepal and Sikkim. It is an endangered language due to increasing influence from Nepali, and transmission of the language is likely to decline. Thulung has also been influenced extensively by Nepali, such as in vocabulary and grammar.

== Classification ==
Thulung is a Kiranti language, most closest related to Bahing.

== Status ==
Nepali is increasingly influencing the Thulung people; this has been the case over the past few centuries, though it has increased rather strongly since the 1970s. Thulung speakers are all likely bilingual, and transmission of Thulung to children is increasingly less likely; thus, Thulung is likely to go extinct in the future. The principal factors resulting in the endangerment of Thulung are education, as education cannot be "reasonably carried out" due to the ethnic composition of Thulung-speaking villages, and the language is not written, and economy, as parents wish for their children to be as proficient in Nepali as possible for opportunities outside of the villages. Additionally, interethnic marriages result in the household speaking Nepali as a lingua franca, thus making it increasingly unlikely that children will learn Thulung. The Atlas of the World's Languages in Danger classifies Thulung as Definitely Endangered.

== Morphology ==
Noun classifiers, common in Sino-Tibetan languages, have been greatly reduced in Thulung. The remaining classifiers include -le, for both animate and inanimate nouns, -phe, used for counting generally round objects, including bananas, coins, and bread, though largely supplanted by -le, and -lem, used for days, though only when counting up to three. Other now-disused classifiers include -bop, used for round objects, and -sɯl, for elongated objects; -phe has also been reported to be used for flat objects.

== Vocabulary ==
Bilingualism in Thulung and Nepali has resulted in extensive language contact and borrowing. Many native Thulung words also have a Nepali counterpart in the Thulung lexicon.
