= Ministry of Federal Affairs and General Administration =

Government ministry of Nepal

- सङ्घीय मामिला तथा सामान्य प्रशासन मन्त्रालय
- Emblem of Nepal

Ministry of Nepal overview
- Preceding Ministry of Nepal: Ministry of Federal Affairs and Local Development
- Headquarters: Kathmandu; 27.694344°N 85.325521°E
- Ministers responsible: Pratibha Rawal; Cabinet minister
- Ministry of Nepal executive: Rabilal Panth, Secretary
- Website: mofaga.gov.np

The Ministry of Federal Affairs and General Administration (Nepali: सङ्घीय मामिला तथा सामान्य प्रशासन मन्त्रालय), (MoFAGA), is the ministry of Nepal that supervises activities undertaken by the local governments in Nepal. It also regulates and manages the civil service.

MoFAGA is the only ministry with direct linkage with the country's municipalities, rural municipalities and provinces. It also plays a direct role in implementing various eServices in the local governments.

== Background ==
- In 1972, Local Development Department (Nepali: स्थानीय विकास विभाग) under then Home affairs and Panchayat Ministry (Nepali: गृह एवं पञ्चायत मन्त्रालय) was established.
- In 1982, Local Development Department separately established as Local Development Ministry (Nepali: स्थानीय विकास मन्त्रालय).
- In 2008, Nepal abolished its monarchy and owned Federalism thus "Federal Affairs" added to "Local Development Ministry".

== Divisional Branches ==
Ministry has seven divisions, namely

- Federal Affairs Division
- General Administration Division
- Self Governance Division
- Monitoring and Evaluation Division
- Planning and Foreign Aid Co-ordination Division
- Municipality and Environment Management Division and
- Infrastructure Development Division.

== Objectives ==
The ministry is responsible for enhancing the access of socially and economically disadvantaged groups, region and community to government services. It is particularly responsible for empowering women, dalits, indigenous peoples, Madheshi, Muslims, disabled and ultra-poor people.
