= Khotang District =

Khotang District खोटाङ जिल्ला
- District
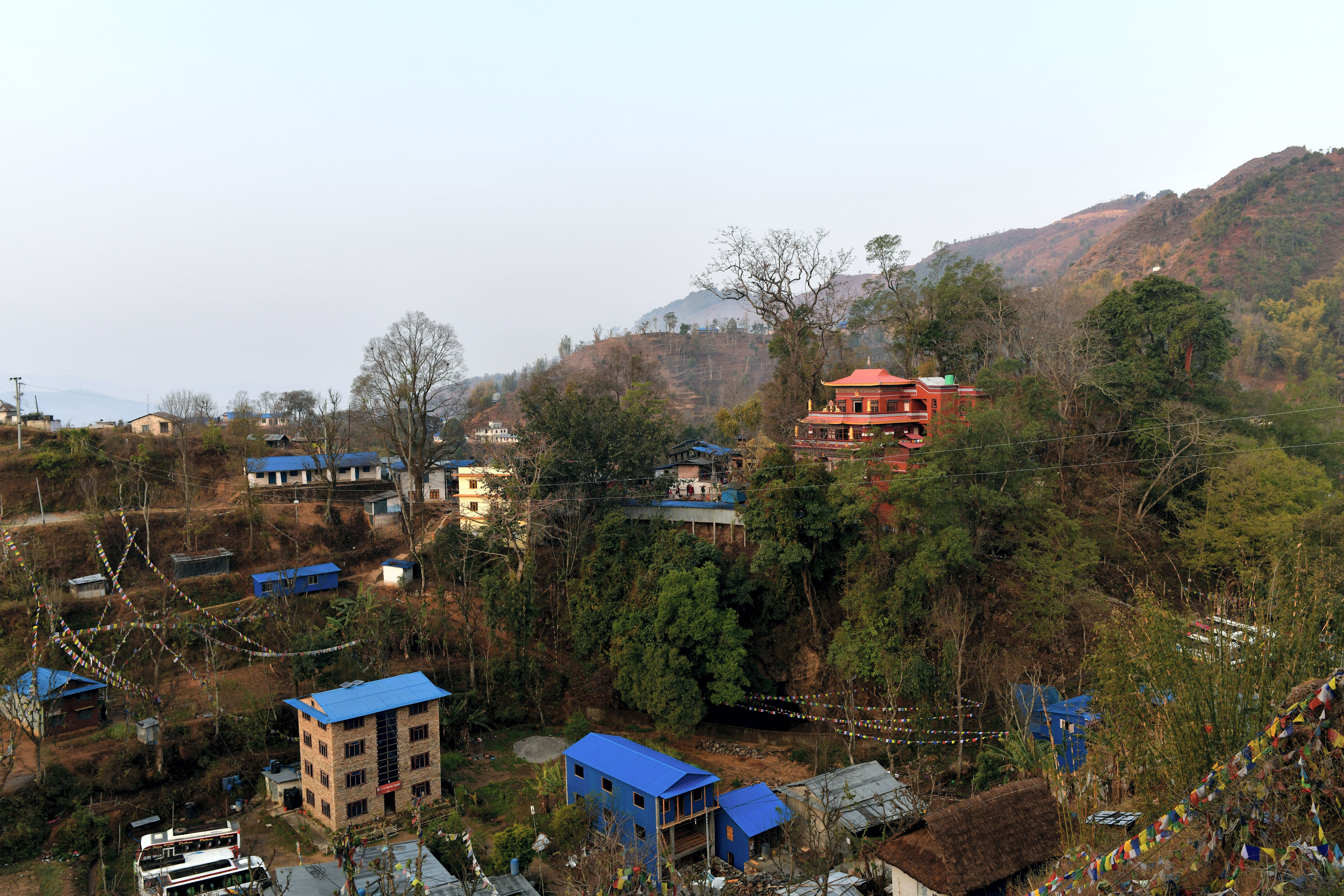
- View of Maratika-Halesi, a famous pilgrimage site

- Location of Khotang in dark yellow

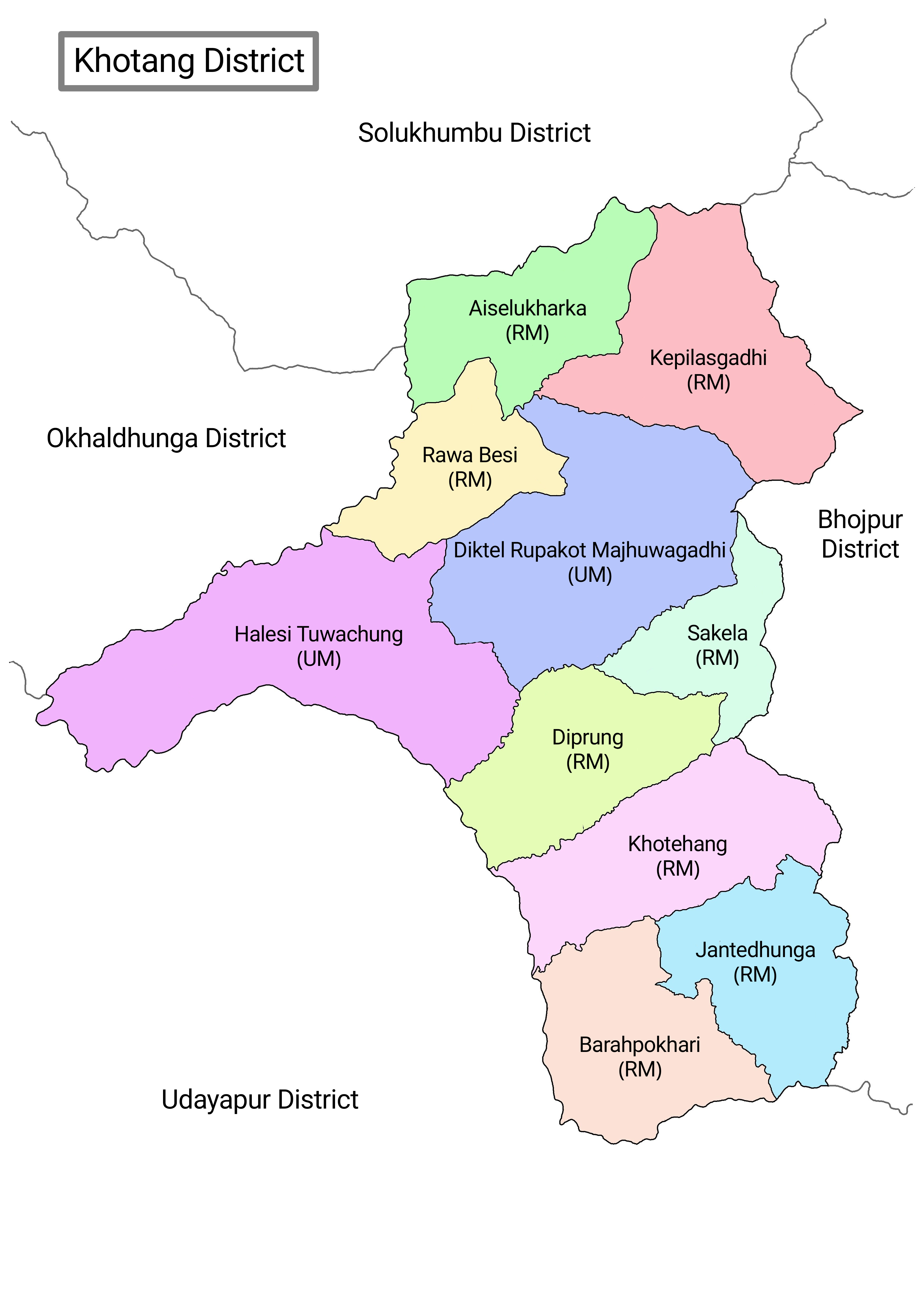
- Khotang District with local level body
- Coordinates: 27°12′N 86°47′E
- Country: Nepal
- Province: Koshi Province
- Established: 1962
- Admin HQ.: Diktel

Government
  - Type: Coordination committee
  - Body: DCC, Khotang
  - Deputy-Head: Mr. Iraj Khadka and Mrs. Pooja Khadka
  - Parliamentary constituencies: 1 Ms Iruja Khadka
  - Provincial constituencies: 2

Area
  - Total: 1,591 km^{2} (614 sq mi)

Population (2021)
  - Total: 175,298
  - Density: 110.2/km^{2} (285.4/sq mi)
  - Households: 42,647

Demographics
  - Ethnic groups: Hindus, Kirat, Christians
  - Ethnic castes: Rai; Gurung; Chhetri; Bahun; Magar; Newar
  - Female ♀: 53 %
  - Male ♂/100 female: 88.90

Human Development Index
  - Income per capicta: 1,132 US$
  - Poverty rate: 29.47
  - Literacy: 69%
  - Life Expectancy: 70.24%
- Time zone: UTC+05:45 (NPT)
- Postal Codes: 036
- Telephone Code: 56200 (List)
- Main Language(s): Nepali, Chamling, Magar, Tamang Language
- Major highways: Pushpalal Highway, Sagarmatha Highway
- Website: ddckhotang.gov.np/en/

Khotang District (Nepali: खोटाङ जिल्ला) is one of 14 districts of Koshi Province of eastern Nepal. The district, with Diktel as its district headquarters, covers an area of 1,591 km^{2} (614 sq mi) and has a population (2021) of 206,312. The district is bordered by Bhojpur District in the east, Udayapur District in the south, Okhaldhunga District in the west and Solukhumbu District in the North. In this district there are two municipalities and eight rural/urban municipalities.

== History ==
Before the unification of Nepal, Khotang District was a part of Majha Kirat or Khambuwan. The land area between two rivers from Dudh Koshi to Arun River was Majha Kirat and it was under suzerainty of Sen King of Chaudandigadhi.

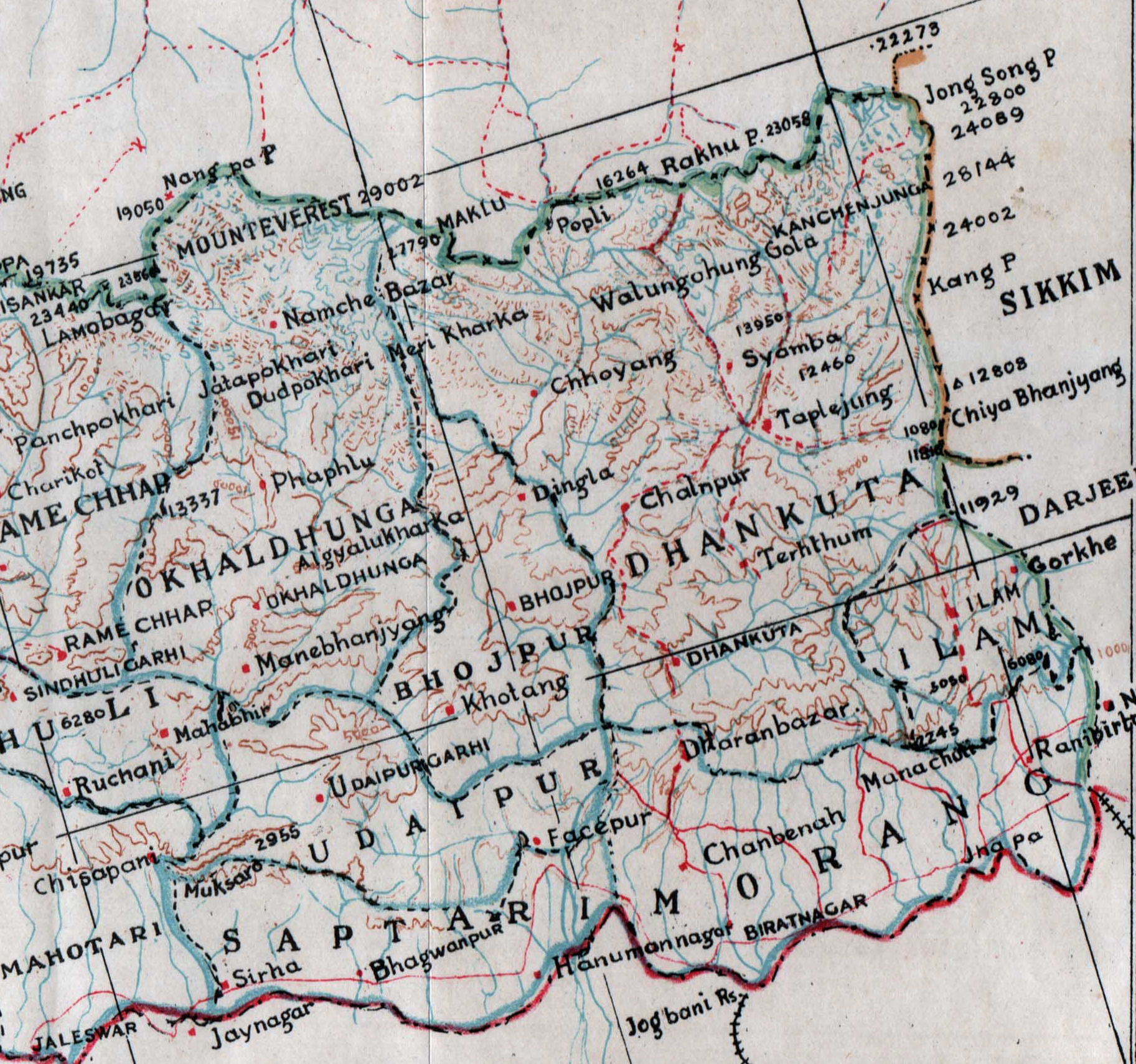
A map of Nepal of 1942 shows current Khotang was part of Okhaldhunga (East No. 3) and Bhojpur (East No. 4)

During Rana rule, Nepal had 32 districts and the current Khotang District was divided between two other districts. Half of the north part of the current Khotang District was part of East No. 3 (Okhaldhunga) and half of southern part of current Khotang was part of East No. 4 (Bhojpur). In 1962 the traditional 32 districts were divided into 75 districts thus Khotang county of East No. 4 and some counties from East No. 3 were merged to become the current Khotang District.

== Geography and climate ==
Geographically, Khotang is a hilly district of Eastern Nepal. It lies on the coordinates of 260° 50" N to 270° 28" N latitude and 860° 26" E to 860° 58" E longitude. Coordinates of the center is 27° 11' 60.00" N and 86° 46' 59.99" E. Total area of the district is 1,591 square kilometres (614 sq mi). The elevations of the district is 152 m to 3620 m from the sea level. Sunkoshi River and Dudh Koshi river makes natural borders in the North, West and South and a series of hills and small river makes border separating it from Bhojpur District in East. Approximately 56% of the district area is covered with forest, and about 42% is under cultivation.

Climate Zone	Elevation Range	% of Area
Lower Tropical	below 300 meters (1,000 ft)	0.7%
Upper Tropical	300 to 1,000 meters 1,000 to 3,300 ft.	31.5%
Subtropical	1,000 to 2,000 meters 3,300 to 6,600 ft.	49.1%
Temperate	2,000 to 3,000 meters 6,400 to 9,800 ft.	16.3%
Subalpine	3,000 to 4,000 meters 9,800 to 13,100 ft.	1.6%

== Demographics ==
Historical population
Year	Pop.	±% p.a.
1981	212,571	—
1991	215,965	+0.16%
2001	231,385	+0.69%
2011	206,312	−1.14%
2021	175,298	−1.62%

At the time of the 2021 Nepal census, Khotang District had a population of 175,298. Khotang had a literacy rate of 76.0% and a sex ratio of 1023 females per 1000 males. 70,086 (39.98%) lived in urban municipalities.

Ethnicity/caste of Khotang district (2021)
1. Rai (41.0%)
2. Chhetri (19.1%)
3. Bahun (5.62%)
4. Newar (5.22%)
5. Magar (5.19%)
6. Kami (4.96%)
7. Tamang (3.76%)
8. Sarki (3.50%)
9. Damai (3.01%)
10. Bhujel (1.82%)
11. Sanyasi (1.38%)
12. Gurung (1.08%)
13. Other Janjati (4.14%)
14. Others (0.21%)

Ethnicity/caste: 40.98% of the population were Rai, 19.13% Chhetri, 5.62% Bahun, 5.22% Newar, 5.19% Magar, 4.96% Kami, 4.90% Tamang, 3.23% Sarki, 3.01% Damai, 1.82% Bhujel, 1.38% Sanyasi and 1.08% Gurung.

Languages of Khotang district (2021)
1. Nepali (47.6%)
2. Chamling (17.5%)
3. Magar Dhut (4.52%)
4. Tamang (3.85%)
5. Bantawa (3.82%)
6. Sampang (3.62%)
7. Dumi (2.71%)
8. Newar (2.27%)
9. Puma (2.13%)
10. Thulung (2.09%)
11. Wambule (1.94%)
12. Nachhiring (1.35%)
13. Koyee (1.27%)
14. Others (5.28%)

As their first language, 47.63% of the population spoke Nepali, 17.52% Chamling, 4.52% Magar Dhut, 3.85% Tamang, 3.82% Bantawa, 3.62% Sampang, 2.71% Dumi, 2.27% Newari, 2.13% Puma, 2.09% Thulung, 1.94% Wambule, 1.35% Nachhiring and 1.27% Koyee. In 2011, Nepali was spoken by 50.12% of the population as their first language.

Religion in Khotang District (2021)
Religion	Percent
Hinduism	52.20%
Kirat Mundhum	36.20%
Buddhism	8.34%
Christianity	3.07%
Other or not stated	0.19%

Religion: 52.20% were Hindu, 36.20% Kirati, 8.34% Buddhist, 3.07% Christian, 0.1% Prakriti and 0.3% others.

== Administration ==
Khotang District is administered by Khotang District Coordination Committee (Khotang DCC). The Khotang DCC is elected by Khotang District Assembly. The head of Khotang DCC is Mr. Kamal Bhimraj Khadka and Mrs. Indrakala Khadka is deputy head of Khotang DCC.

Khotang District Administration Office under Ministry of Home Affairs co-operate with Khotang DCC to maintain peace, order and security in the district. The officer of District Administration office called CDO and current CDO of Khotang DAO is Shaligram Sharma Paudel

Khotang District Court is a Judicial court to see the cases of people on district level.

Administration	Name	Head	Website
Legislative	District Coordination Committee	Mr. Bobby Chamling	dcckhotang.gov.np
Executive	District Administration Office	Mr. Shaligram Sharma Paudel	daokhotang.moha.gov.np
Judicial	District Court	Mr. Matrika Prasad Acharya	supremecourt.gov.np/court/khotangdc

== Division ==
The district consists of 10 Municipalities, out of which two are urban municipalities and eight are rural municipalities. These are as follows:

#	Local body	Population (2011)	Area (KM^{2})	Wards	Web
1	Diktel Rupakot Majhuwagadhi	46903	246.51	15	
2	Halesi Tuwachung	29532	280.17	11	
3	Khotehang	22474	164.09	9	
4	Diprung	20175	136.48	7	
5	Aiselukharka	16097	125.93	7	
6	Jantedhunga	15444	128.62	6	
7	Kepilasgadhi	15288	191.28	7	
8	Barahpokhari	14349	141.6	6	
9	Rawabesi	13369	97.44	6	
10	Sakela	11594	97.99	5	

=== Former divisions (1962-2015) ===
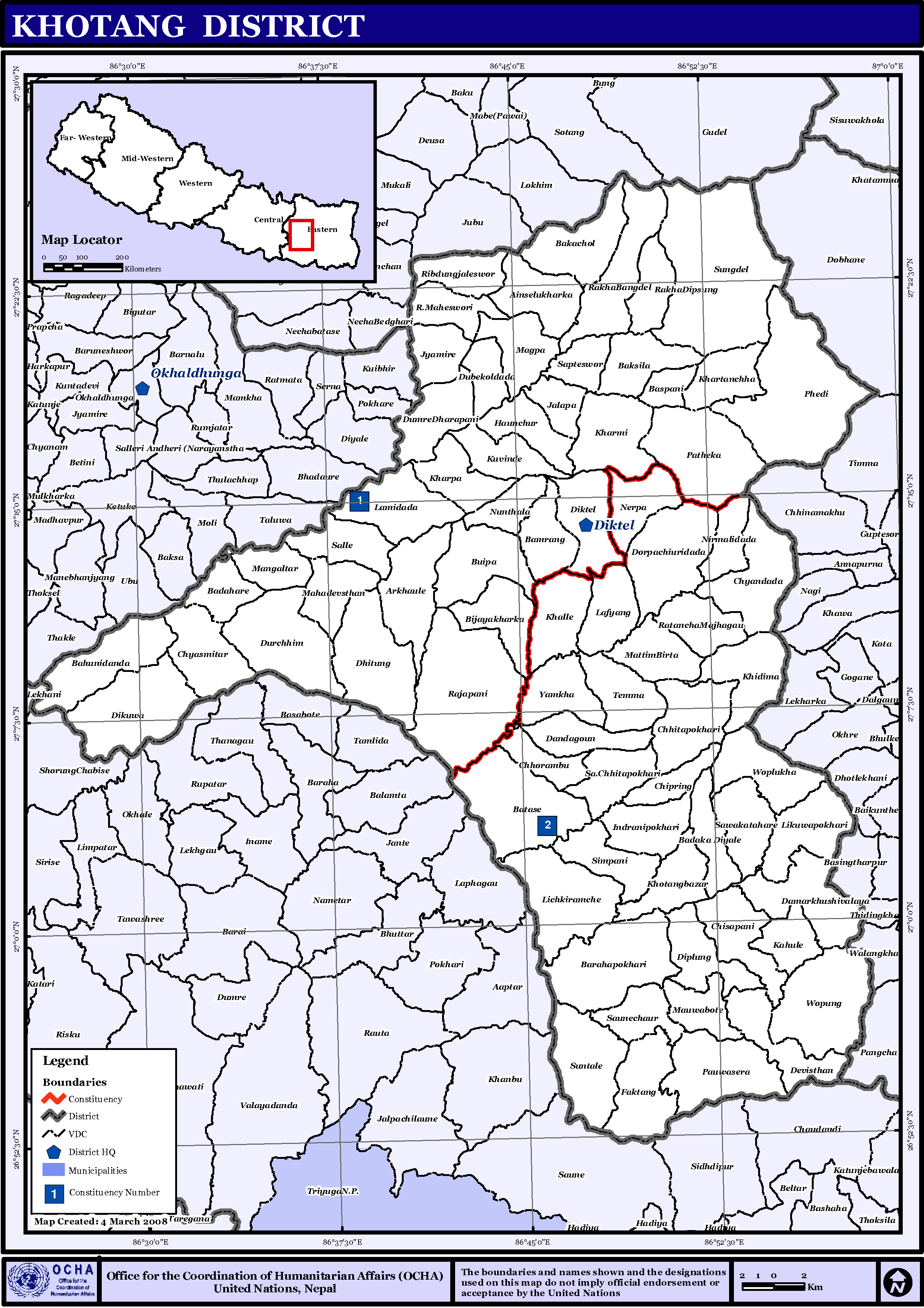
Map of the VDCs in Khotang District

Prior to the restructuring of the district, Khotang District consisted of the following municipalities and Village development committees: (Before 2014, Khotang district had 76 VDC and no municipality. Diktel municipality established in 2014 merging some VDC)

- Ainselu Kharka
- Arkhale
- Badahare
- Badka Dipali
- Bahunidanda
- Bakachol
- Baksila
- Bamrang
- Barahapokhari
- Baspani
- Batase
- Chhitapokhari
- Chhorambu
- Chipring
- Chisapani
- Chyandanda
- Chyasmitar
- Damarkhu Shivalaya
- Dandagaun
- Devisthan
- Dharapani
- Dhitung
- Diktel Municipality
- Dikuwa
- Diplung
- Dipsung
- Dorpa Chiuridanda
- Dubekol
- Dumre Dharapani
- Durchhim
- Hanchaur
- Jyamire
- Kaule
- Kharmi
- Kharpa
- Khartamchha
- Khidima
- Khotang Bazar
- Kubhinde,
- Laphyang
- Lamidanda
- Lichki Ramche
- Linkuwa Pokhari
- Magpa
- Mahadevasthan
- Mangaltar
- Mattim Birta
- Mauwabote
- Nerpa
- Nirmalidada
- Nunthala
- Patheka
- Pauwasera
- Phaktang
- Rajapani
- Rakha Bangdel
- Rakha Dipsung
- Ratancha Majhagaun
- Ribdung Jaleshwari
- Ribdung Maheshwari
- Salle
- Santeshwar Chhitapokhari
- Sapteshwar
- Saunechaur
- Sawakatahare
- Simpani
- Solma
- Sungdel
- Suntale
- Woplukha
- Wopung

== Constituency ==
The whole district is a constituency of the 165 parliament constituencies of Nepal. The district is identifies as Bhojpur 1 seat. The district is divided into two segment for provincial constituency named as Bhojpur 1(A) & Bhojpur 1(B). There are 106,534 electorates in the district.

Constituency
Constituencies	Settlements	MP/MLA	Party
Bhojpur 1	whole district	Sudan Kirati	NCP
Bhojpur 1(A)	Bhojpur Municipality (ward no.-1-5,10), Tyamke Maiyunm (1-5), Pauwadungma (1,2), Arun, Shadanand, Salpasilichho	Rajendra Kumar Rai	NCP
Bhojpur 1(B)	Bhojpur Municipality (ward no.-6-9,11,12), Tyamke Maiyunm (6-9), Pauwadungma (3-6), Ramprasad Rai, Hatuwagadhi, Aamchok	Sher Dhan Rai	NCP

== Transportation ==
Khotang District (Diktel) is connected by two means of transportation (1) By road (2) By Air.

=== Roadways ===
The headquarter of Khotang District (Diktel) is connected with Sagarmatha Highway (H09), which is 156 kilometres (97 mi) long 2 way road. The Sagarmatha Highway is connected with Mahendra Highway at Kadmaha (Saptari District) The other Important road is Pushpalal Highway which is also called Mid-Hills Highway of Nepal. This road connects Khotang to eastern and western hill destinations directly.

=== Airports ===
- Thamkharka Airport
- Khanidanda Airport
- Lamidanda Airport

== Places of Interest ==
- Halesi-Maratika Caves - A pilgrimage site for Hindus also known as Pashupatinath of East, and Kirati historic Tuwachung Jayajum located in Halesi Tuwachung municipality.
- Barah Pokhari is a lake and a religious destination, as well as a part of trekking trail located in Barahapokhari rural municipality.
- Bhulbhule (Pond & Waterfall)
- Hill, mountains, rivers trekking and more
