= Shadanand Municipality =

Shadanand षडानन्द
- Municipality (नगरपालिका)
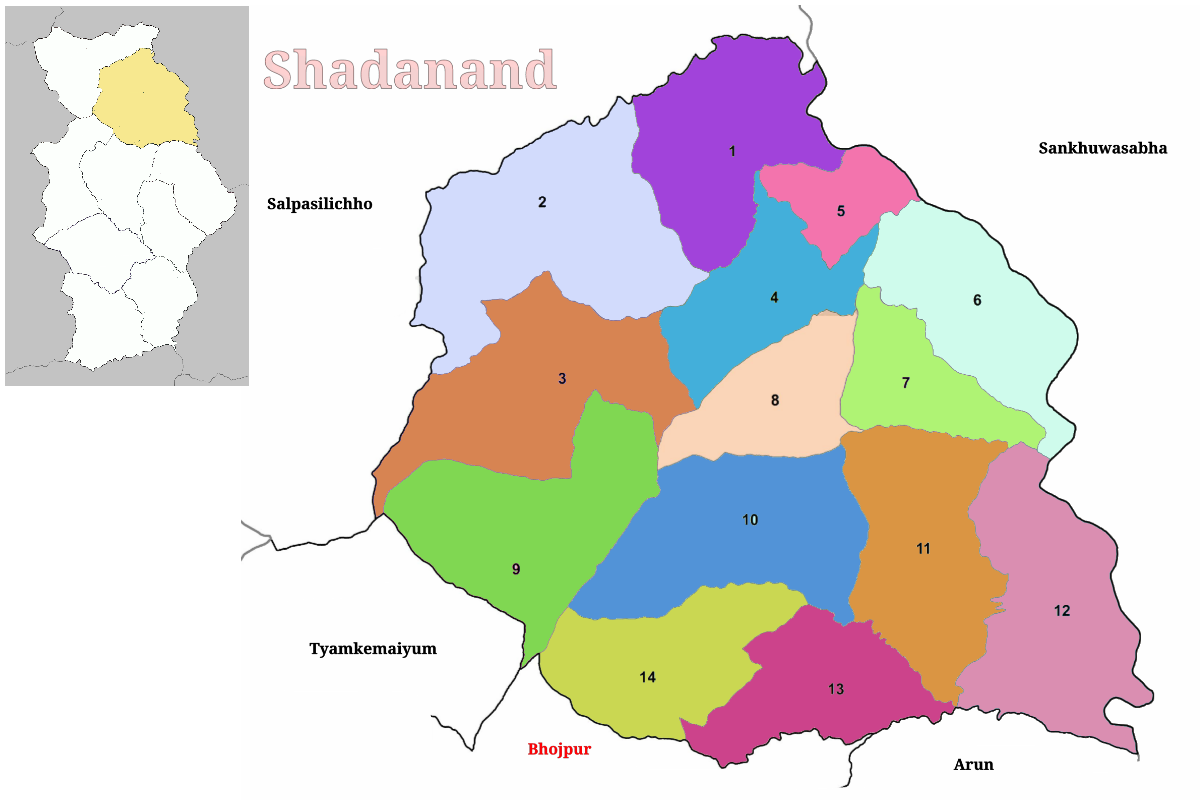
- Shadanand municipality in Bhojpur District

- Location in Koshi Province (Nepali: कोशी प्रदेश) Shadanand (Nepal)
- Country: Nepal
- Province: Koshi Province
- District: Bhojpur District
- Wards: 14
- Established: 2 December 2014
- Incorporated: 10 March 2017
- Incorporated VDCs: Nepaledanda, Kudak Kaule, Deurali, Sangpang, Boya
- Seat: Dingla Bazar

Government
  - Mayor: Mr. Surendra Kumar udas (NCP)
  - Deputy Mayor: Mrs. Pramila Rai (CPN (Maoist Centre))

Area
  - Total: 241.15 km^{2} (93.11 sq mi)

Population (2011)
  - Total: 31,610
  - Density: 131.1/km^{2} (339.5/sq mi)
- Time zone: UTC+5:45 (Nepal Time)
- Website: www.shadanandamun.gov.np

Shadanand (Nepali: षडानन्द) is an urban municipality located in Bhojpur District of Koshi Province of Nepal. It was named after Bala Guru Shadananda.

The municipality was established on 2 December 2014 by merging the Village Development Committees of Keurepani, Khartimchha, Kimalung, Mulpani and Tunggochha. It had an area of 101.5 km^{2} (39.2 sq mi) and had a combined population of 13,272 inhabitants.

On 10 March 2017 more Village Development Committees were incorporated into Shadanand municipality and the total area of the municipality increased to 241.15 square kilometres (93.11 sq mi) and the total population to 31,610. The VDCs incorporated into the municipality were: Nepaledanda, Kudak Kaule, Deurali, Sangpang and Boya.

The municipality is divided into total 14 wards and the headquarters of the municipality is situated in Dingla Bazar.
