= Tyamkemaiyum Rural Municipality =

Temke Maiyung टेम्केमैयुङ
- Rural Municipality (गाउँपालिका)
- Location in Koshi Province Temke Maiyung (Nepal)
- Coordinates: 27.21°N 86.96°E
- Province: Koshi Province
- District: Bhojpur
- Wards: 9
- Established: 10 March 2017
- Seat: Annapurna

Government
  - Type: Gaunpalika
  - Chairperson: Mr. Saroj Basnet (NC)
  - Vice-chairperson: Mrs. Rama Devi Rai (NCP)

Area
  - Total: 173.41 km^{2} (66.95 sq mi)

Population (2011)
  - Total: 17,911
  - Density: 103.29/km^{2} (267.51/sq mi)
- Time zone: UTC+5:45 (Nepal Standard Time)
- Website: official website

Temke Maiyung (Nepali: टेम्केमैयुङ) is one of seven rural municipalities (गाउँपालिका) of Bhojpur District of Koshi Province of Nepal. There are a total of 9 municipalities in Bhojpur of which 2 are urban and 7 rural.

According to MoFALD Temke Maiyung has an area of 173.41 square kilometres (66.95 mi^{2}) and the total population of the municipality is 17, 911 as of Census of Nepal 2011. Timma, Chhinamukh, Annapurna, Nagi, Khawa, Kot, Gogane and Lekharka VDCs were merged to form Tyamkemaiyum Rural Municipality. Annapurna is the Headquarter of this newly formed municipality.
