= Arun Rural Municipality =

Rural Municipality in Province No. 1, Nepal

Arun अरुण
- Rural Municipality (गाउँपालिका)
- Location in Koshi Province Arun (Nepal)
- Coordinates: 27.21°N 87.16°E
- Province: Koshi Province
- District: Bhojpur
- Wards: 7
- Established: 10 March 2017
- Seat: Pyauli

Government
  - Type: Village Council
  - Chairperson: Mr. Shalikram Khatry (NC)
  - Vice-chairperson: Mrs. Binita Dhakal (NC)

Area
  - Total: 154.76 km^{2} (59.75 sq mi)

Population (2011)
  - Total: 17,687
  - Density: 114.29/km^{2} (296.00/sq mi)
- Time zone: UTC+5:45 (Nepal Standard Time)
- Website: official website

Arun (Nepali: अरुण) is one of seven rural municipalities (गाउँपालिका) of Bhojpur District of Koshi Province of Nepal. There are a total of 9 municipalities in Bhojpur of which 2 are urban and 7 are rural.

According to MoFALD Arun has an area of 154.76 square kilometres (59.75 mi^{2}) and the total population of the municipality is 17, 687 as of Census of Nepal 2011. Champe, Yangpang, Pyauli, Charambi, Jarayotar and Yaku VDCs were merged to form Arun Rural Municipality. Pyauli is the Headquarter of this newly formed rural municipality.
