= Pauwadungma Rural Municipality =

Pauwadungma पौवादुङमा
- Rural Municipality (गाउँपालिका)
- Location in Koshi Province Pauwadungma (Nepal)
- Coordinates: 27.15°N 87.14°E
- Province: Koshi Province
- District: Bhojpur
- Wards: 6
- Seat: Changre

Government
  - Type: Village Council
  - Chairperson: Mr. Kiran Rai (NCP)
  - Vice-chairperson: Mrs. Jyotsna Rai (NCP)

Area
  - Total: 118.86 km^{2} (45.89 sq mi)

Population (2011)
  - Total: 15,394
  - Density: 129.51/km^{2} (335.44/sq mi)
- Time zone: UTC+5:45 (Nepal Standard Time)
- Website: official website

Pauwadungma (Nepali: पौवादुङमा) is one of seven rural municipalities (गाउँपालिका) of Bhojpur District of Koshi Province of Nepal. Of a total of 9 municipalities in Bhojpur, 2 are urban and 7 rural.

According to MoFALD Pauwadungma has an area of 118.86 square kilometres (45.89 mi^{2}) and the total population of the municipality is 15, 394 as of Census of Nepal 2011. To form this new Rural Municipality Sanodumma, Thulodumma, Bastim, Changre, Tiwari Bhanjyang and Shyamsila were merged, which previously were Village development committee (local level administrative villages). Fulfilling the requirement of the new Constitution of Nepal 2015, MoFALD replaced all old VDCs and Municipalities into 753 new local level body (Municipality).

Chyangre is the Headquarter of this newly formed rural municipality.
