= Aamchowk Rural Municipality =

Place in Nepal

Aamchok आमचोक
- Rural Municipality (गाउँपालिका)
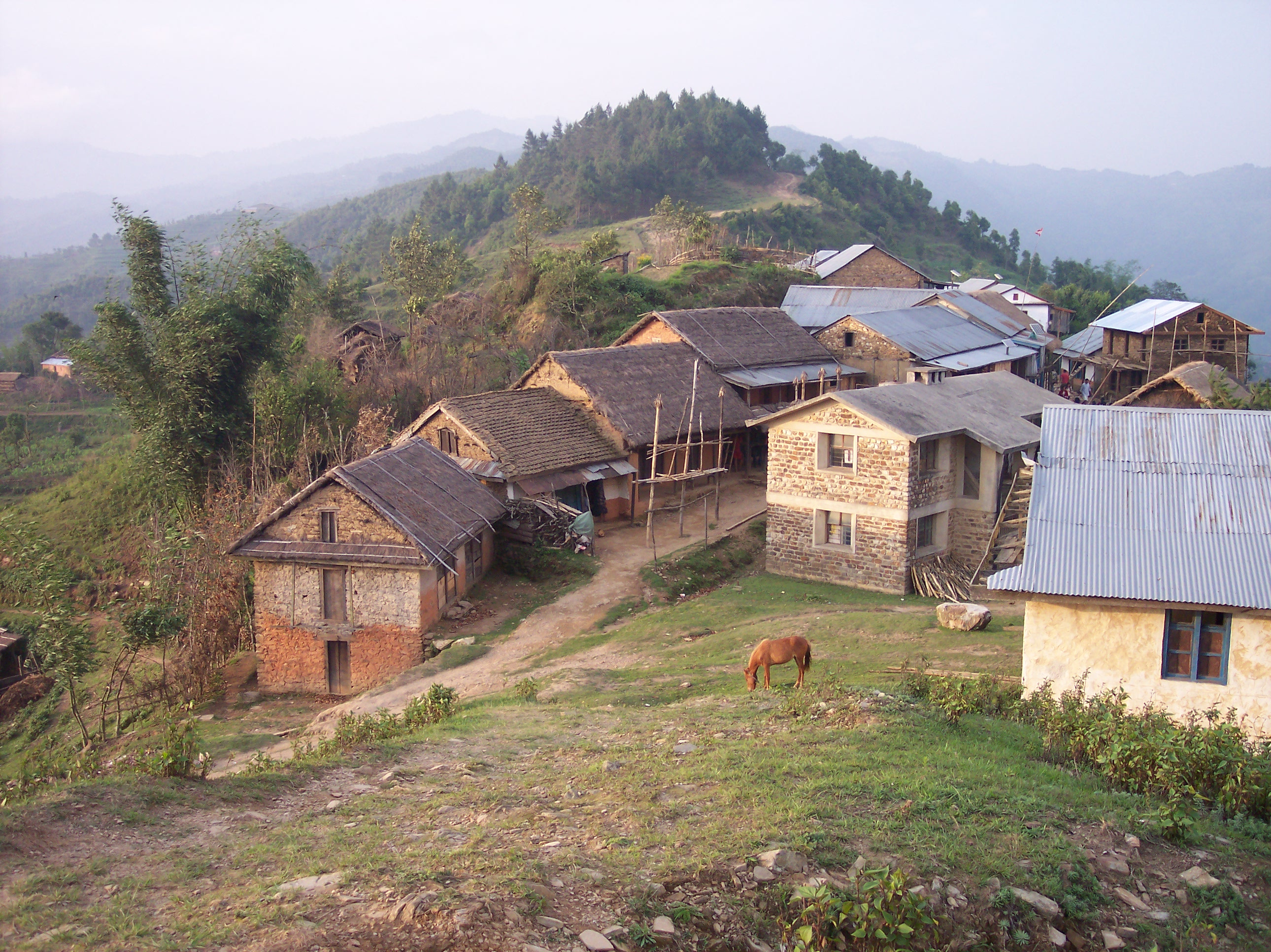
- Balankha (center of Aamchok)

- Location in Koshi Province Aamchok (Nepal)
- Coordinates: 26°59′24″N 86°58′48″E
- Province: Koshi Province
- District: Bhojpur
- Wards: 10
- Established: 10 March 2017
- Seat: Balankha

Government
  - Type: Gaunpalika
  - Chairperson: Mr. Ashok Rai (NCP)
  - Vice-chairperson: Mrs. Sita Rai (NCP)

Area
  - Total: 184.89 km^{2} (71.39 sq mi)

Population (2011)
  - Total: 18,720
  - Density: 101.2/km^{2} (262.2/sq mi)
- Time zone: UTC+5:45 (Nepal Standard Time)
- Postal Code: 10609
- Website: official website

Aamchok (Nepali: आमचोक) is one of seven rural municipalities (गाउँपालिका) of Bhojpur District of Koshi Province of Nepal. Out of the 9 municipalities in Bhojpur, 2 are urban and 7 are rural.

According to MoFALD, Aamchok has an area of 184.89 square kilometres (71.39 mi^{2}) and the total population of the municipality is 18, 720 as of Census of Nepal 2011. Wasingtharpu, Yoo, Dummana, Thidingkha, Pawala, Dewantar, Balankha and Pangcha VDCs were merged to form Aamchok Rural Municipality. Balankha is the Headquarter of this newly formed municipality.
