= Ramprasadrai Rural Municipality =

Ramprasad Rai रामप्रसाद राई
- Rural Municipality (गाउँपालिका)
- Location in Koshi Province Ramprasad Rai (Nepal)
- Coordinates: 27.0654°N 87.0074°E
- Province: Koshi Province
- District: Bhojpur
- Wards: 8
- Established: 10 March 2017

Government
  - Type: Village executive
  - Chairperson: Mr. Vijay Rai (NCP)
  - Vice-chairperson: Mrs. Samjhana Rai (NCP)

Area
  - Total: 158.83 km^{2} (61.32 sq mi)

Population (2011)
  - Total: 18,894
  - Density: 118.96/km^{2} (308.10/sq mi)
- Time zone: UTC+5:45 (Nepal Standard Time)
- Website: official website

Ramprasad Rai (Nepali: रामप्रसादराई) is one of seven rural municipalities of Bhojpur District of Koshi Province of Nepal. Of the nine municipalities in Bhojpur District, two are urban and seven are rural.

The municipality is situated in south-west area of the district. The municipality got its name after Ram Prasad Rai who was a democratic warrior.

Ramprasadrai has an area of 158.83 square kilometres (61.32 mi^{2}) and total population of the municipality is 18894 as of Census of Nepal 2011. The municipality is divided into eight wards.

Okhre, Dhodalekhani, Bhulke, Dalgaun, Manebhanjyang, Baikunthe and Basikhola were Incorporated when this new local level body was forming. This new local level body was formed on 10 March 2017, fulfilling the requirement of the new Constitution of Nepal 2015, Ministry of Federal Affairs and Local Development replaced all old VDCs and Municipalities into 753 new local level body (Municipality).
