= Dungmali language =

Kirati language spoken in Nepal

Dungmali
- Arthare
- Native to: Nepal
- Region: Koshi Zone
- Ethnicity: 10,000 Kiranti Rai (2011 census)
- Native speakers: 6,300 (2011 census)
- Language family: Sino-Tibetan: Tibeto-Burman; Mahakiranti (?); Kiranti; Central; Southern; Dungmali

Language codes
- ISO 639-3: raa
- Glottolog: dung1252
- ELP: Dungmali

Dungmali, or Dungmali-Bantawa, is a Kiranti language spoken in Nepal. It is largely cognate with Bantawa language, but differs grammatically and phonologically.

== Locations ==
Dungmali is spoken in eastern Bhojpur District, Koshi Province, in Thulo Dumba, Sano Dumba, and Bastim Similarly, Tiwari Bhanjyan, Chyangre, Yaku etc. which is also called Pouwakhesang Thum. VDC's (Ethnologue). The Dungmali area extends all the way east to the Arun River.

In present days Dungmali's people are living in different countries Nepal, India, Bhutan, United States of America (USA).

According to kirat Rai Dungmalis Bhasa Sanskriti Samrachhan Mancha, Dungmalis were generated from Hangwang, Pungwat, Pawen, Chokhang and Salukathewa Pachhas ‘[( Clans)]’. There is an interesting anecdote about the naming Dungmali. There was no water at all at the beginning there is a myth about it, that is once Lugun “Dholebijiwa” (powerful exorcist) of Katunje shut the bow at Tindhara from Marangtang performing [( Mundhum)] to drink water his thirst while he was coming from Dhankuta. There is estimated 10,000 population of this community and they have honor to their distinct culture, Dhukursingh.
