= Saam language =

Kiranti language of Nepal

Saam
- Native to: Nepal
- Region: Mechi Zone
- Ethnicity: Kiranti
- Native speakers: 530 (2011 census) (400 Saam, 130 Lingkhim)
- Language family: Sino-Tibetan: Tibeto-Burman; Mahakiranti (?); Kiranti; Central; Saam
- Dialects: Bungla; Lingkhim; Sambya

Language codes
- ISO 639-3: raq
- Glottolog: saam1282
- ELP: Saam

Saam, Saama Kha, is a nearly extinct Kiranti language spoken in Nepal. The name Saam is ambiguous, and shared with neighboring languages.

Chukwa may be Saam if it is not Kulung.

== Geographical distribution ==
Saam is spoken in the following locations of Nepal (Ethnologue).

- Dobhane and Khatamma (Khartangma) VDC's, northern Bhojpur District, Kosi Zone; straddling the Irkhuwa River, in Dangmaya, Okharbote, Khartangma, and Dobhane settlements between the Phedi River and Irkhuwa River
- Phikkal VDC, Ilam District, Mechi Zone
