= Dingla =

Dingla दिङ्ला
- Place
- Location in Nepal
- Coordinates: 27.355607°N 87.137547°E
- Country: Nepal
- Zone: Koshi Zone
- District: Bhojpur District
- Time zone: UTC+5:45 (Nepal Time)

Dingla (Nepali: दिङ्ला) is a historic region in Bhojpur District in the Koshi Province of eastern Nepal. It includes three Village development committees: Keurepani, Mulpani, and Tunggochha. One of the first schools of Nepal was established in this region in 1879 AD. Recently, another municipality named "Shadanada" has been announced by government of Nepal. Tungechha, Mulpani, Keurenipani, Deurali, Boya, Kimalung and Khartamchha V.D.C, Sangpang V.D.C. are included in newly announced municipality. Dingla Bazaar is the centre of this second municipality and of Bhojpur district.
