= Dhurbaraj Rai =

Nepalese politician

Honourable Dhurbaraj Rai
- ध्रुवराज राई

Member of Parliament, Pratinidhi Sabha
- Elected
- Assumed office March 2026
- Preceded by: Sudan Kirati
- Constituency: Bhojpur 1

Chairperson of Tyamkemaiyum
- In office September 2017 – May 2022
- Preceded by: Position established
- Succeeded by: Saroj Basnet

Personal details
- Born: 27 June 1982 (age 43) Bhojpur District, Nepal
- Party: Shram Sanskriti (since 2025)
- Other political affiliations: CPN (UML) (until 2025)
- Parent: Mani Prasad Rai (father)

Dhurbaraj Rai is a Nepalese politician who has been the Member of Parliament (MP) for Bhojpur 1 from Shram Sanskriti Party. He served as the chairperson of Tyamkemaiyum rural municipality from 2017 to 2022.

== Political career ==
Rai became a member of his village's chapter of Yuwa Sangh in 1999. He became a district committee member of the Bhojpur chaper of All Nepal National Free Students Union in 2000 and became vice chair in 2005. He became a Koshi zonal committee member in 2006 and a central committee member in 2008. He also served as the chapter president of ANNFSU in Bhojpur Multiple Campus for two terms from 2003.

He became a member of the district committee of CPN (UML). Rai was elected as the chair of Tyamkemaiyum rural municipality at the 2017 local elections. He lost re-election in the 2022 local elections. He was a Koshi provincial committee member.

He joined Shram Sanskriti Party ahead of the nomination deadline for the 2026 general election. He was elected to the Pratinidhi Sabha from Bhojpur 1.
