= Dumba (disambiguation) =

DUMBA is a collective living space and anarchist, queer, all-ages community center and venue in Brooklyn, New York.

Dumba may also refer to:

- Sano Dumba, a Village Development Committee, Bhojpur District, eastern Nepal
- Thulo Dumba, a Village Development Committee, Bhojpur District, eastern Nepal
- Dumba (Malanje), a town and commune in Angola
- Palais Dumba in Vienna, built for Nikolaus Dumba
- Dumbarton Bridge (California)

== People with the surname ==
- Nikolaus Dumba (1830-1900)
- Konstantin Dumba (1856-1947), Austro-Hungarian ambassador to the US
- Mathew Dumba (1994-present), NHL defenceman of the Minnesota Wild
