= Salpasilichho Rural Municipality =

Salpasilichho साल्पासिलिछो
- Rural Municipality (गाउँपालिका)
- Location in Koshi Province Salpasilichho (Nepal)
- Coordinates: 27.43°N 87.06°E
- Province: Koshi Province
- District: Bhojpur
- Wards: 6
- Center: Chaukidanda

Government
  - Type: Village Council
  - Chairperson: Mr. Daulath Kulung Rai (Independent)
  - Vice-chairperson: Ms. Susmita Kulung Rai (NC)

Area
  - Total: 193.33 km^{2} (74.65 sq mi)

Population (2021)
  - Total: 12,284
  - Density: 63.539/km^{2} (164.57/sq mi)
- Time zone: UTC+5:45 (Nepal Standard Time)
- Website: official website

Salpasilichho (Nepali: साल्पासिलिछो) is one of seven rural municipalities (गाउँपालिका) of Bhojpur District of Koshi Province of Nepal. Out of 9 municipalities in Bhojpur, 2 are urban and 7 rural.

According to MoFALD Salpasilichho has an area of 193.33 square kilometres (74.65 mi^{2}) and the total population of the municipality is 12,284 as of Census of Nepal 2021. To form this new Rural Municipality Dobhane, Khatamma, Chaukidanda and Kulunga were merged, which previously were Village development committee (local level administrative villages). Fulfilling the requirement of the new Constitution of Nepal 2015, Ministry of Federal Affairs and Local Development replaced all old VDCs and Municipalities into 753 new local level body (Municipality).

Chaukidanda is the Headquarter of this newly formed rural municipality.
