= Ranibas =

Ranibas may refer to:

- Ranibas, Bheri, Nepal
- Ranibas, Janakpur, Nepal
- Ranibas, Kosi, Nepal
- Ranibas, Udayapur, Nepal
