= Manebhanjyang =

Manebhanjyang may refer:

- Manebhanjyang, Bhojpur, a village in Bhojpur District, Nepal
- Manebhanjyang, Sankhuwasabha, a village in Sankhuwasabha District, Nepal
- Manebhanjyang Rural Municipality, a rural municipality in Okhaldhunga District, Nepal
- Manebhanjyang, Darjeeling, a town in Darjeeling District, India
