= Hasanpur, Nepal =

Hasanpur, Nepal हंसपुर
- Municipality
- Location in Nepal
- Coordinates: 26.94°N 87.13°E
- Country: Nepal
- Zone: Kosi Zone
- District: Bhojpur District

Population (1991)
  - Total: 2,277
- Time zone: UTC+5:45 (Nepal Time)

Hasanpur is a village development committee in Bhojpur District in the Kosi Zone of eastern Nepal. At the time of the 1991 Nepal census it had a population of 2277 persons living in 421 individual households.
