= Dumrighat =

Coordinates: 26°37′N 87°29′E

- Village development committee
- Interactive map of Dumrighat
- Country: Nepal
- Zone: Kosi Zone
- District: Morang District

Population (1991)
  - Total: 10,802
- Time zone: UTC+5:45 (Nepal Time)

Dumrighat is a village development committee in Morang District, Kosi Zone, south-eastern Nepal. According to the 1991 Nepal census, it had a population of 10,802 people living in 2,082 individual households.
