= Jahadakeroun-1 =

Coordinates: 26°37′N 87°29′E

Jahada
- Village development committee
- Interactive map of Jahada
- Country: Nepal
- Zone: Kosi Zone
- District: Morang District

Population (1991)
  - Total: 10,802
- Time zone: UTC+5:45 (Nepal Time)

JahadaKeron-1 is a village development committee in Morang District in the Kosi Zone of south-eastern BayarbanKeroun VDC nepal in Nepal. At the time of the 1991 Nepal census it had a population of 1080 people living in 298 individual households.
