= Yaku =

Yaku may refer to:

- Yakushima, Japan (屋久島), which could be referred to as Yaku Island
- Yaku, Kagoshima, Japan (屋久町), a town on the island of Yakushima in Kagoshima Prefecture
- Yaku, Nepal
- A specific combination of tiles or cards that increases the value of the player's hand in Japanese Mahjong or Koi-Koi
- Yaku, an unusual low-pressure system in the far Southeastern Pacific that impacted Ecuador and Peru in March 2023
- Yaku (Haida village), an historical village on Haida Gwaii, British Columbia, Canada
- Yaku: Yūjō Dangi, a 1996 video game for the PlayStation
- Yaku Yakusen, a character from The 100 Girlfriends Who Really Really Really Really Really Love You
