= Bala Guru Shadananda =

Nepalese social reformer and education activist

- Born: Bhojpur district, Nepal
- Died: kathmandu pachali ghat
- Parent(s): Rukmini Adhikari (Mother), Laxminarayan Adhikari (Father)

Bala Guru Shadananda (also spelled as Balaguru Sadanda or Balaguru Khadananda, Nepaliःबाला गुरु षडानन्द) was a social reformer and education activist of eastern Nepal. He is credited with establishing the first school in Nepal, outside the Kathmandu Valley and actively taking part to abolish Sati tradition.

== Biography ==
Shadananda was born in Dingla village of Bhojpur district in Poush 1882 BS (1825-1826). His birth name was Shadananda Adhikari. He was the youngest child of mother Rukmini and father Laxmi Narayan Adhikari.

== Contributions ==
In 1932 BS (1875-1876), he opened a Sanskrit school that was open to students from all communities at the time when Rana regime strictly restricted to open schools in Nepal. His vision was to have a school that can produce a productive labour. For this, he started the commercial cultivation of the Rudraksha and invented the concept of jageda ban meaning extra forest which is considered as the initial idea of community forest in Nepal. He started a weekly market every Saturday in Dingla to enhance the income of people from Bhojpur and Sankhuwasabha.

In 1940 BS (1883-1884), he established the Sitaram Guthi(Sitaram trust) to promote social and cultural works such as to run school, construct temples and resting places.

Balaguru also campaigned against the Sati practices which was widely in practise at his time. His campaign later inspired Chandra Shumsher to abolish the practice in 1977 BS (1920-1921).

== Legacy ==
- A college is named after him in Bhojpur district.
- Shadanand Municipality was named after him.
- A prize (Nepali:षडानन्द राष्ट्रिय पुरस्कार) is awarded in his name on his birthday to a person or organization working in the social field.
