= Khairang, Bhojpur =

Coordinates: 27°1′N 87°7′E

Khairang खैराङ
- Village Development Committee
- Interactive map of Khairang
- Country: Nepal
- Zone: Kosi Zone
- District: Bhojpur District

Population (1991)
  - Total: 3,050
- Time zone: UTC+5:45 (Nepal Time)

Khairang is a Village Development Committee in Bhojpur District in the Kosi Zone of eastern Nepal. At the time of the 1991 Nepal census it had a population of 3050 persons residing in 533 individual households.
