= Syamsila =

Coordinates: 27°10′N 87°6′E

Syamsila श्यामसिला
- Municipality
- Interactive map of Syamsila
- Country: Nepal
- Zone: Kosi Zone
- District: Bhojpur District

Population (1991)
  - Total: 2,767
- Time zone: UTC+5:45 (Nepal Time)

Syamsila is a village development committee in Bhojpur District in the Kosi Zone of eastern Nepal. At the time of the 1991 Nepal census it had a population of 2767 persons living in 517 individual households.
