= Patle Pani =

Coordinates: 26°59′0″N 87°9′0″E

Patle Pani पात्लेपानी
- Village development committee
- Interactive map of Patle Pani
- Country: Nepal
- Zone: Kosi Zone
- District: Bhojpur District

Population (1991)
  - Total: 3,787
- Time zone: UTC+5:45 (Nepal Time)

Patle Pani is a village development committee in Bhojpur District in the Kosi Zone of eastern Nepal. At the time of the 1991 Nepal census it had a population of 3787 persons living in 743 individual households.
