= Okhre =

Okhre is ward no. 1 of Ram Prasad Rai Rural Municipality in Bhojpur District in the Kosi Zone of eastern Nepal. At the time of the 1991 Nepal census, it had a population of 2729 persons living in 534 individual households. It contains a deposit of calcium ore.
