= Bairban =

Coordinates: 27°04′N 86°02′E

Bairban बयरवन गाविस
- Village development committee
- Interactive map of Bairban
- Country: Nepal
- Zone: Kosi Zone
- District: Morang District

Population (1991)
  - Total: 19,246
- Time zone: UTC+5:45 (Nepal Time)

Bairban is a village development committee in Morang District in the Kosi Zone of south-eastern Nepal. At the time of the 1991 Nepal census it had a population of 19,246 people living in 3621 individual households.
