= Homtang =

Homtang होम्ताङ
- Village development committee
- Location in Nepal
- Coordinates: 27.02°N 87.16°E
- Country: Nepal
- Zone: Kosi Zone
- District: Bhojpur District

Population (1991)
  - Total: 6,064
- Time zone: UTC+5:45 (Nepal Time)

Homtang is a village development committee in Bhojpur District in the Kosi Zone of eastern Nepal. At the time of the 1991 Nepal census it had a population of 6064 persons living in 1210 individual households.
