= Chhinamukh =

Coordinates: 27.4100°N 87.0500°E

Chhinamakhu छिनामखु
- Village development committee
- Interactive map of Chhinamakhu
- Country: Nepal
- Zone: Kosi Zone
- District: Bhojpur District

Population (1991)
  - Total: 3,375
- Time zone: UTC+5:45 (Nepal Time)

Chhinamukh is a village development committee in Bhojpur District in the Kosi Zone of eastern Nepal. At the time of the 1991 Nepal census it had a population of 3375 persons living in 639 individual households.
