= Boya, Nepal =

Boya, Nepal बोया
- Former Village Development Committee (पूर्व गाउँ विकास समिति)
- Location in Nepal
- Coordinates: 27.28°N 87.10°E
- Country: Nepal
- Zone: Kosi Zone
- District: Bhojpur District

Population (1991)
  - Total: 4,107
- Time zone: UTC+5:45 (Nepal Time)

Boya is a Village Development Committee in Bhojpur District in the Kosi Zone of eastern Nepal. The 1991 Nepal census counted 4,107 persons in 447 individual households in Boya.
