= Sangpang =

Sangpang साङपाङ
- Former Village Development Committee (पूर्व गाउँ विकास समिति)
- Location in Nepal
- Coordinates: 27.31°N 87.11°E
- Country: Nepal
- Zone: Kosi Zone
- District: Bhojpur District

Population (1991)
  - Total: 3,567
- Time zone: UTC+5:45 (Nepal Time)

Sangpang is a village development committee in Bhojpur District in the Koshi Zone of eastern Nepal. At the time of the 1991 Nepal census it had a population of 3567 persons living in 718 individual households.
