= Timma =

Timma तिम्मा
- Village development committee
- Location in Nepal
- Coordinates: 27.28°N 87.01°E
- Country: Nepal
- Zone: Kosi Zone
- District: Bhojpur District

Population (1991)
  - Total: 3,336
- Time zone: UTC+5:45 (Nepal Time)
- Postal code: 57008
- Area code: 029

Timma is a village development committee in Bhojpur District in the Kosi Zone of eastern Nepal. At the time of the 1991 Nepal census it had a population of 3336 persons living in 621 individual households.
