= Pyauli =

Pyauli प्याउली
- Village development committee
- Location in Nepal
- Coordinates: 27.21°N 87.16°E
- Country: Nepal
- Zone: Kosi Zone
- District: Bhojpur District

Government
  - MR.: Krishna Kumar Niraula (Khatry)

Population (1991)
  - Total: 2,637
- Time zone: UTC+5:45 (Nepal Time)
- Postal code: 57004
- Area code: 029

Pyauli is a village development committee in Bhojpur District in the Kosi Zone of eastern Nepal. At the time of the 1991 Nepal census it had a population of 2637 persons living in 469 individual households.
