= Lekharka =

Lekharka लेखर्क
- Village development committee
- Location in Nepal
- Coordinates: 27.13°N 86.94°E
- Country: Nepal
- Zone: Kosi Zone
- District: Bhojpur District

Population (1991)
  - Total: 2,885
- Time zone: UTC+5:45 (Nepal Time)

Lekharka is a village development committee in Bhojpur District in the Kosi Zone of eastern Nepal. According to the 1991 Nepal census it had a population of 2885 people living in 509 individual households.
