= Kudak Kaule =

Coordinates: 27°23′N 87°5′E

Kudak Kaule कुदाककाउले
- Former Village Development Committee (पूर्व गाउँ विकास समिति)
- Interactive map of Kudak Kaule
- Country: Nepal
- Zone: Kosi Zone
- District: Bhojpur District

Population (1991)
  - Total: 2,734
- Time zone: UTC+5:45 (Nepal Time)

Kudak Kaule is a village development committee in Bhojpur District in the Kosi Zone of eastern Nepal. At the time of the 1991 Nepal census it had a population of 2734 persons living in 507 individual households.
