= Balankha =

Balankha, Aamchok बालंखा
- Neighborhood
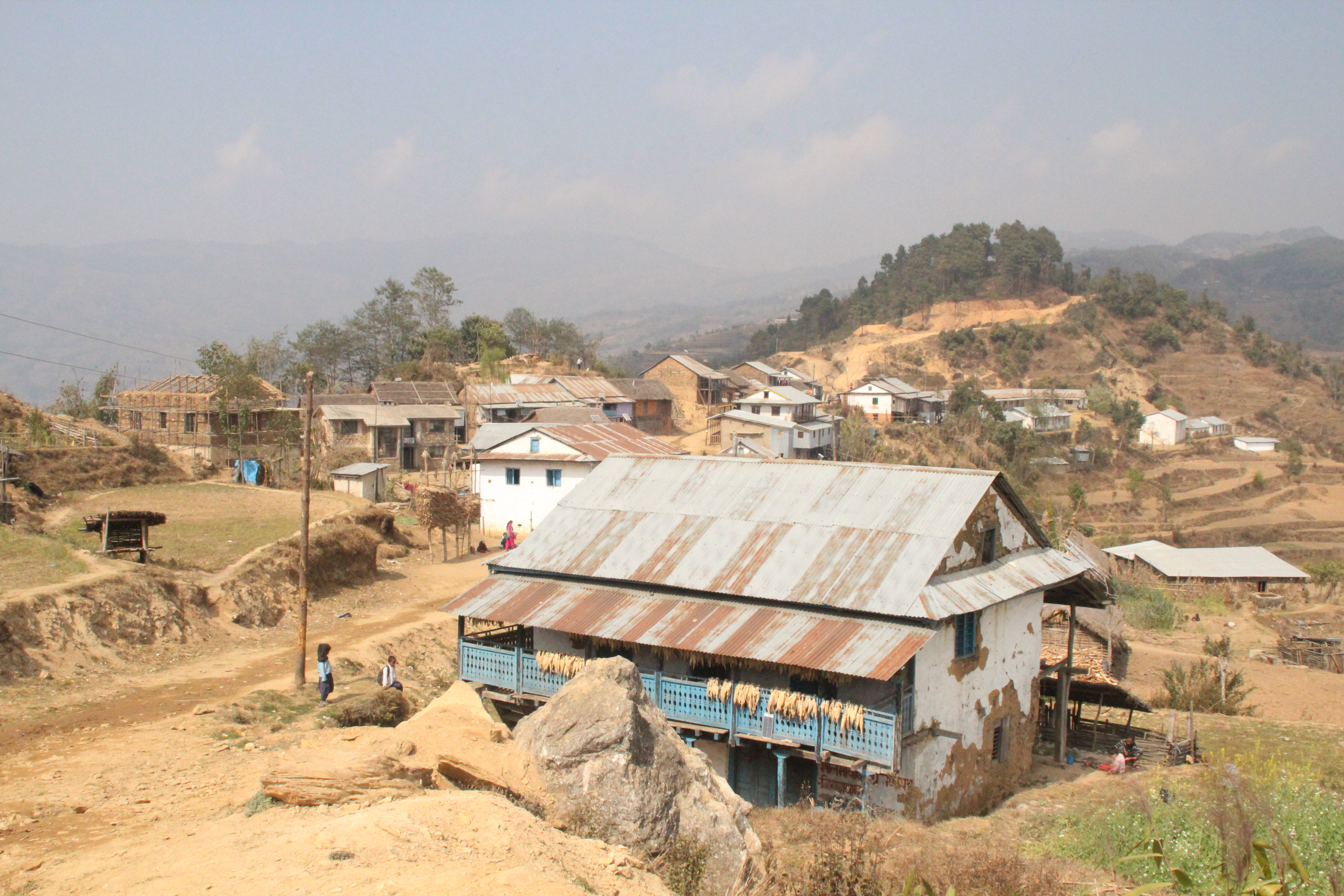
- Balankha Bazar

- Location in Province No. 1 Balankha, Aamchok (Nepal)
- Coordinates: 26°59′24″N 86°58′48″E
- Country: Nepal
- Province: Province No. 1
- District: Bhojpur District
- Rural Municipality: Aamchok
- Area (Ward No.): 4

Area
  - Total: 12.69 km^{2} (4.90 sq mi)

Population (2011)
  - Total: 1,696
  - Density: 133.6/km^{2} (346.1/sq mi)
- Time zone: UTC+5:45 (Nepal Time)
- Postal code: 57013
- Area code: 029
- Website: official website

Balankha (Nepali: बालंखा) (sometimes misspelled as "Walangkha") is the headquarters of the newly formed Aamchok rural municipality in Bhojpur District of Province No. 1 of Nepal. Balankha was a separate Village development committee before 2017. It became part of Aamchock rural municipality fulfilling the requirement of the new Constitution of Nepal 2015. Ministry of Federal Affairs and Local Development replaced all old VDCs and Municipalities into 753 new local level body (Municipality).

Balankha VDC has now shrunk to one of the Ward (No.4) of Aamchok RM. According to Ministry of Federal Affairs and Local Developme Balankha has an area of 12.69 square kilometres (4.90 mi^{2}) and the total population of the village/town is 1696 as of Census of Nepal 2011.

It is one of the growing towns in the southwestern part of the Bhojpur district. It is about 16 miles southwest of the district headquarters, Bhojpur Bazaar, and takes about a day and half of hiking to get to Balankha bazaar.
Since the establishment of local High School in 2039 B.S, Balankha has been a Center point of this region for political and educational activities for a long time. However growth did not happen as expected due to the long political instability and desertion of local youths to cities and foreign lands for better opportunities. Now connected with road network coupled with political stability and other local development activities, the potential growth of this town is higher. The recent change of local body and election conducted in August 2017, is expected to boost the development effort to new level.

== Geography ==
It borders Bopung (बोपुङ) Village of Khotang District in the west and Ranitar (रानिटार) of Udaypur District (उदयपुर) in the south. In the north is Ram Prasad Rai rural municipality (रामप्रसाद राइ गाउपालिका) and in the eastern side there is Hatuwagadi rural municipality (हतुवागढी गाउपालिका). Within Balankha Ward 4 there are nine small villages They are Sipak (सिपाक), Balankha (बालङ्खा), Chhongkha (छोङ्खा), Khakanla (खकन्ला), Phuintang (फुइन्ताङ), Karkigaun (कार्कीगाउ), Ragatung (रागातुङ), and Mayung (मैयुङ). The climate is semi tropical. The lands in higher elevation is known as "Lek" – and lands in lower elevation; usually areas along the riverbeds are known as "besi". Usually Besi is considered more fertile than Lek because of abundance of water.

Rice, corn (maize) and all tropical vegetables and fruits are grown in Besi. In Lek, soil is less fertile so people usually grow potatoes, corn, and millet.

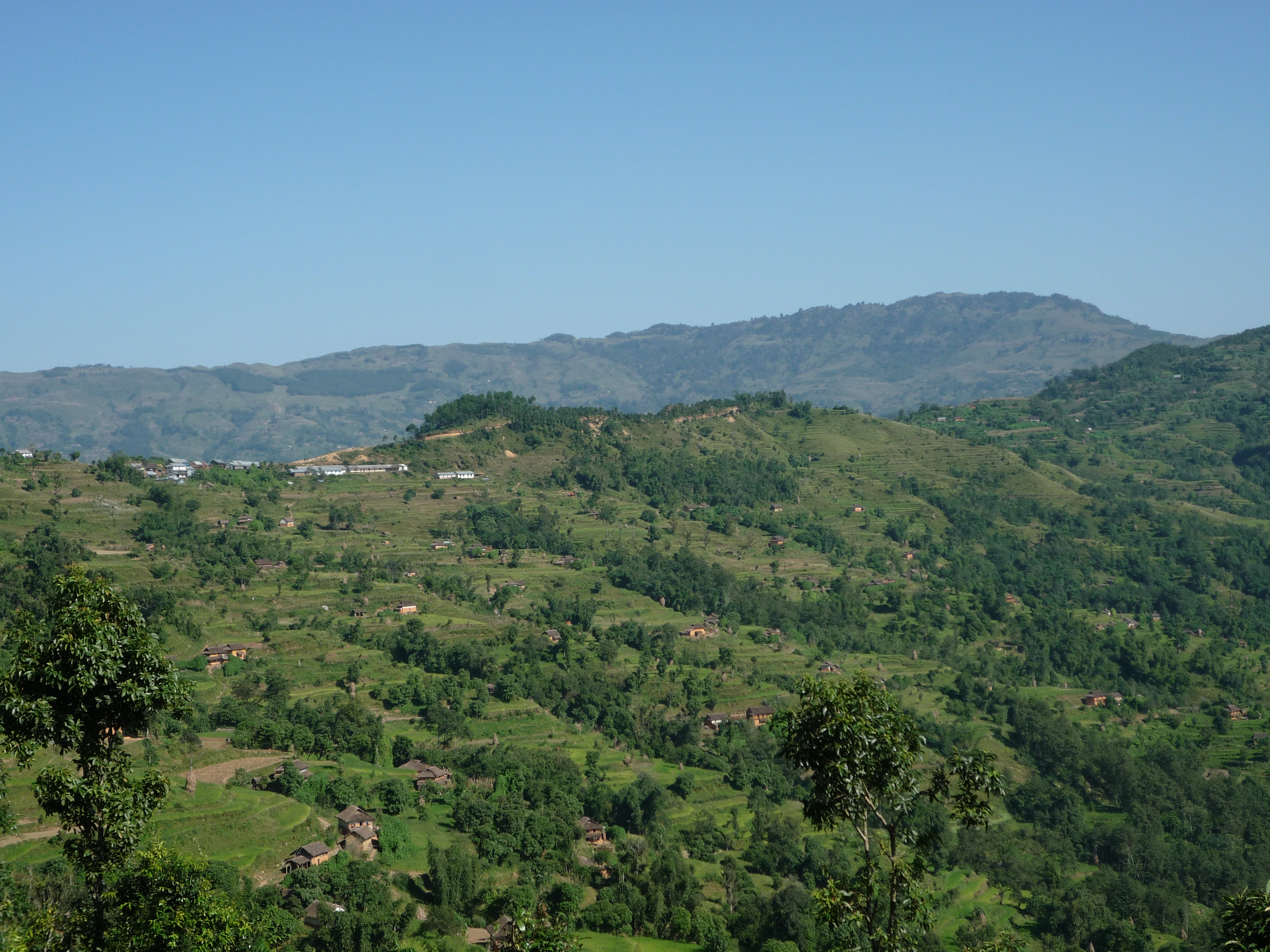
Panoramic view of Balankha

== History ==
=== The name Balankha (बालाङ्खा) and AAmchok(आमचोक) ===
The name Amchok is also known as Barha Amchok (बाह्र आमचोक). According to local historian Jaya Shivahang (जय शिवाहाङ्ग), there used to be 12 different villages of Mangphang Rais in this region. When they had to demarcate their borderline to each other they called it Aamchak (आमचक) in Bantawa language meaning (next to you or your area). That's how the Aamchok (आमचोक) got its name.

Balankha name also derives from local Bantawa language "Bhaglaamkha" (भाकलाम्खा). If we break it down, the word "Bhaak" (भाक) means "pig" and Laamma" (लाममा) means "to search" and "khaa" (खा) means "place". So it is the place where the pig was searched. According to local legend, once upon a time this area was covered with thick jungle, and Kirat ancestors Namnu and Hangkhim chased and searched their pigs in this place. So this place was called Bhaaklaamkhaa and over the time the pronunciation changed to Balankha.

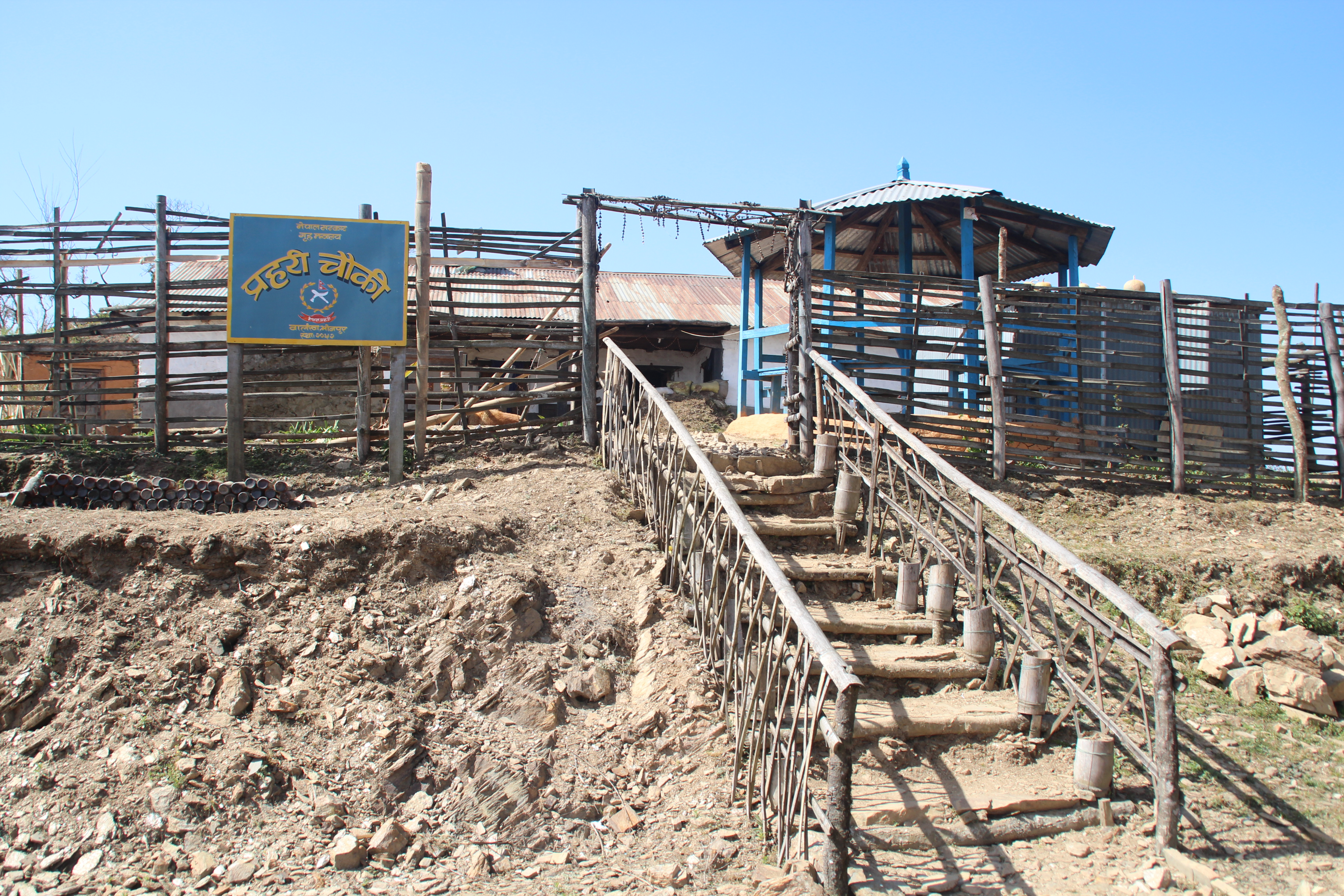
Police post

=== Local story of Shimbha Mala ===
There was a Kirati Chamling King known as Shimbha Mala (शिम्भा माला) in Chamlung (चामलुंग) village near Bopung. He was very powerful and very protective of this area. When King Prithbi Narayan Shah's forces were advancing towards eastern Nepal, he did not want to give up his territory easily. Back in those days, Chandi Danda (चण्डी डांडा) was the main gateway to this area and it was covered with thick jungle. Shimbha Mala and his few warriors armed with bows and arrows fought against Prithvi Narayan's soldiers and tried to stop them here. He and his warriors used to hide in the trees and attack their enemies with their arrows. They had little success in the beginning, but later, Prithbi Narayan's forces overpowered and killed him. They buried him along with his horse at the Chandi Danda. The grave still remains in the area but not many people know about it.

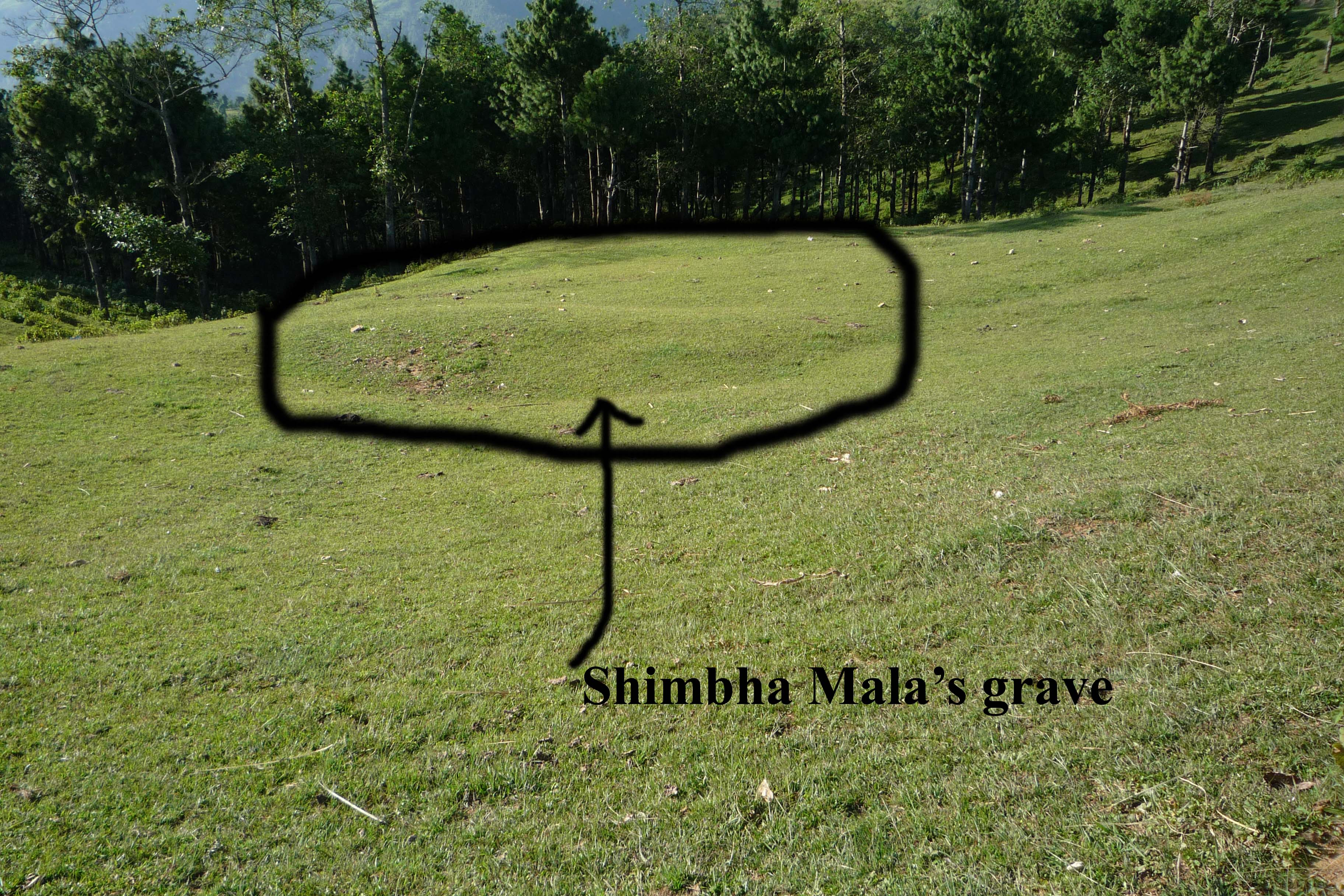
Shimbha Mala's grave in Chandi Bazar

The local Kirat Rais believe that the ghost of Shimbha Mala still roams in the area especially in the nights on nights with a full moon, a new moon and during kirat festivals. It is also believed that anyone who digs up the grave will die. A long time ago, the ghost phenomena used to occur every night. People could hear the horse steps and the sound of bells while the ghost was on the ride from Purne Dada (पुर्णे डांडा) to Raake Dada (राँके डांडा). People were scared to take a walk along the Mulbato (मूलबाटो) at late night for fear of seeing the ghost. A local Chhetri man named Kaale Bista (काले बिष्ट) who lived near the main trail Mulbato was tired of the ghost phenomena every night. One night he was determined to face the ghost directly. He took a big sword KaTTi (कट्टी) in his hand and waited for the ghost. When the ghost arrived on the horse they faced each other. There was no words for few seconds, and all of a sudden, Kale Bista raised his weapon to attack the ghost, and thusly, the ghost became nervous and started to run away. Kale Bista chased the ghost few hundred yards away. Since then the Ghost has never appeared again in his area of Balankha. The great grandson of Kale Bista, Gadul Bista (गडुल बिष्ट ) who died in 2065 B.S. used to tell this story to the locals.

=== Chandi Bazar ===
A long time ago, during Panchayat system, Chandi Bazar village was the official name for this area, to include Thindingkha village. Later on, local administrative map was redesigned. After the restructruction of administrative areas, Chandi Bazar was partitioned into Thidingkha Village Panchayat and Balankha Village Panchayat. However, some older people still call it Amchok Balankha too because Aamchok is the Rana era or early Panchayat era local body name and it consisted the whole south west area of Bhojpur. The new federal government revived the old glory of Amchok by naming the new local body 'Amchok rural municipality'.

== Culture and society ==
Balankha is blend of various castes and ethnic groups. The majority are Kirat Rais but there are Kshetri, Bahun, Kami, Damai, Tamang, Sarki, etc. who have been living in harmony for ages.

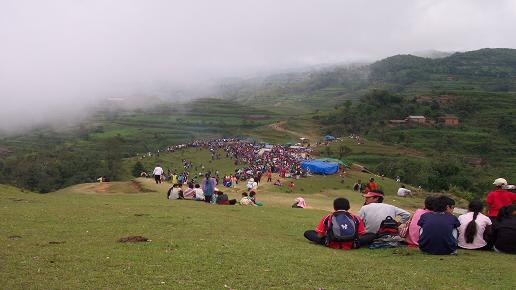
Kirat Rai Ubhauli festival at Chandi Bazar

=== Chhongkha Sakenwa (छोङ्खा साकेन्वा) ===
This is an important part of the cultural tradition of Kirat Rai people in this region. It is one of the most famous places to celebrate Kirat Rai's Sakela or Sakenwa festival. According to Kirat Rai historians, writers (Bam Bahadur Rai, Shyam Raj Rai and bulletins of Kirat Rai Yayokkhaa) and local people, it is about a 600-year-old tradition. The main ritual place is across the Buwa Khola (बुंवा खोला). It is called Chandi Than (चन्डी थान). In every Ubhauli (उभौली) festival, a designated Kirat Rai priest called Nakchhong (नाकछोङ) performs puja and prays to the Kirat Rai ancestors for rain, good crops, good health of the people and livestock and continuity of this great Creation. There are certain processes to perform the ritual, and all Kirat Rais have to follow it properly.

After the ritual is done, they come to Chandi danda or Chandi bazar (चन्डी बजार), an open space near Balankha bazaar. They dance Sakewa dance with Dhol(ढोल) and jhyamta (झ्याम्टा). The dance style is a little different than other Sakewa dances seen in northern Bhojpur and neighboring Khotang district. Here, the rhythm is very slow, as are the dance movements themselves. Others might find the dance less interesting because it has more singing and less dance steps. Most of the Kirat Rais in the southern belt like Hatuwa, Ranibas, Basikhora, Pawala, Khairang, Chhongkha, and so on have similar dance style of Sakenwa.

Beside Kirat Rai, there is a tradition of Bhote ko Mane (भोटेको माने) from Tamang culture. There are a significant number of Tamang people in Balankha. Mane is a kind of stupa they build in memory of their deceased. There used to be a lot of Mane alongside of the mulbato (main trail to Bhojpur), especially in Tinchule jungle, Pasal Bhanjyang, Raake Bazar. The tradition seems to be disappearing slowly. New Mane (माने) are rarely seen anymore. The old ones were all destroyed by treasure hunters almost two decades ago.

Bar Pipal, Chautari, Kuwa are the traditional landmarks in the area. Old Chautaris with beautiful inscriptions etched in stone slates in memory of deceased souls are still found. With old Bar (वर) and Pipal (पिपल) trees side by side and wooden Bench "Falaicha" (फलैंचा), a weary traveler could rest in comfort.

Dashain and Tihar festivals as celebrated as it has national significance. Beside that Kirat Rai's "Udhauli" and "Ubhauli" are two main festivals celebrated with great joy by whole region.

== Education ==
=== Chandeswor Ma. Vi (Grade 1- 10) ===
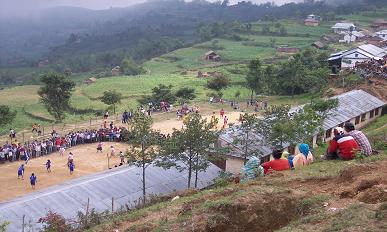
Chandeswor High School playground

Balankha's high school began in 2039 BS. The late King Birendra granted permission to establish Chandeswor High School during his visit to Ghoretar. This was the only High School in the whole Southwest region of Bhojpur and played a vital role to educate local population. Now more than 100 students participate in the SLC exam every year. Later other high schools in neighboring VDCs, e.g. Dummana and Wasing Tharpu were also established. The passing records of the students in SLC is significantly low and has often been questioned about its performance.

The SLC result of 2069 (2012) is about 13%. Out of 77 only 10 students succeeded SLC exam. 3 of them were able to secure first division. One time the Highschool was assigned as SLC Center, but later removed, due to the fact that it poorly conducted the exam and the cheating was uncontrolled.

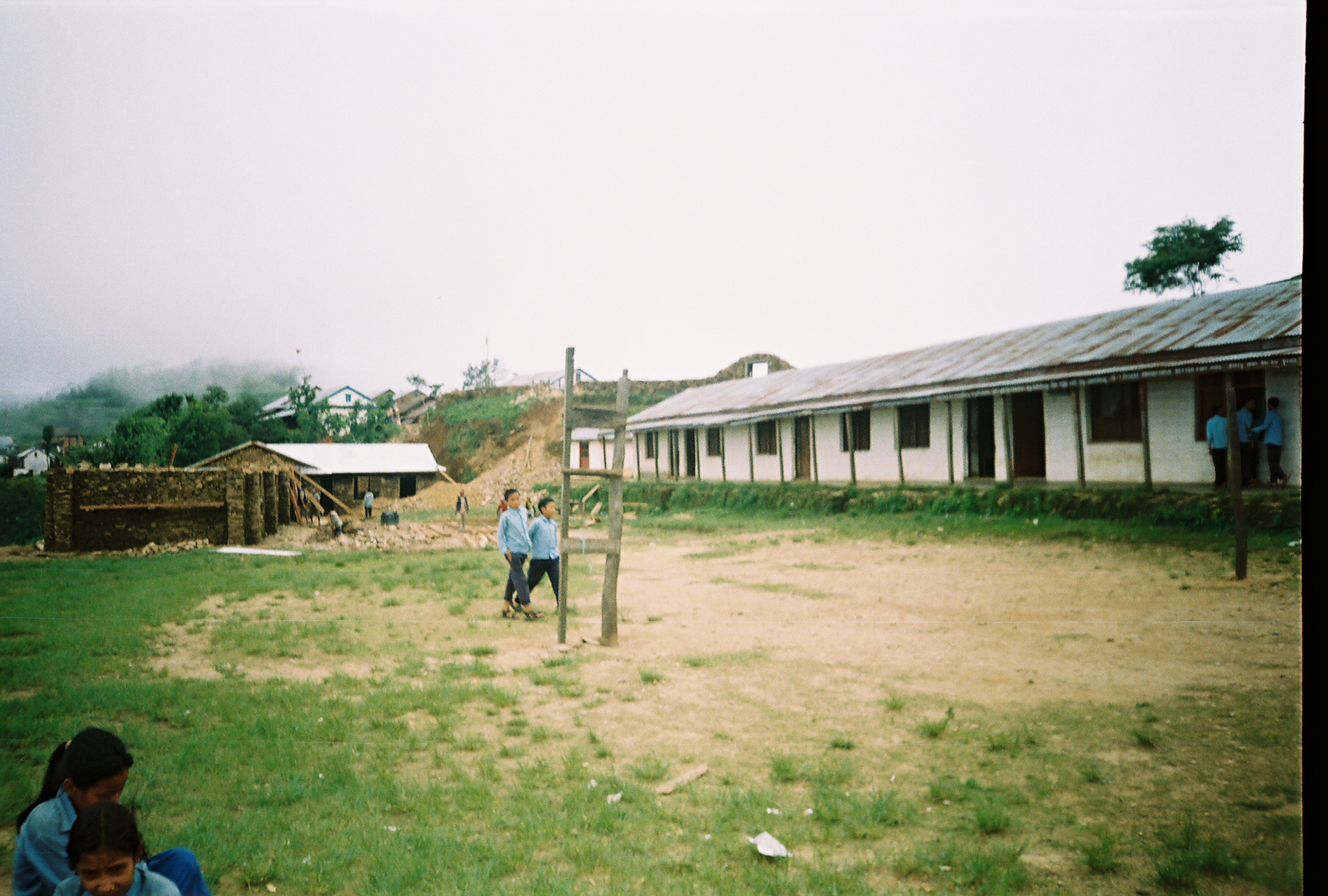
Chandeswor Highschool

=== Chandeswor Uchcha Ma Vi (+2) चन्डेश्वोर उच्च मा. वि. २०६६ ===
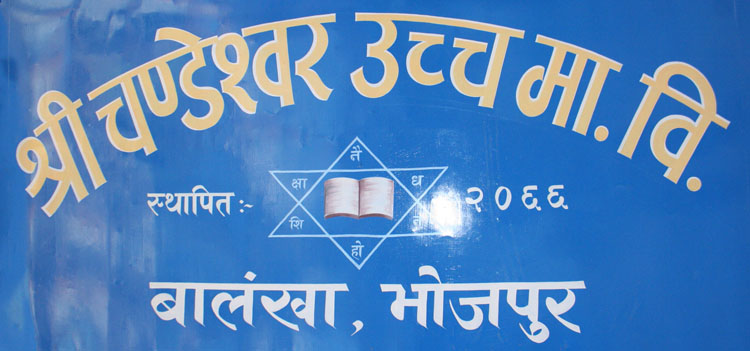
Chadeswor Uchha Ma Vi Signboard

Chandeswor High School got approved for a +2 higher education system in 2066 B.S. With its establishment, students from seven other neighboring VDCs will have opportunity to complete their +2 degree in the local level. It has given boost to the educational development in this region.

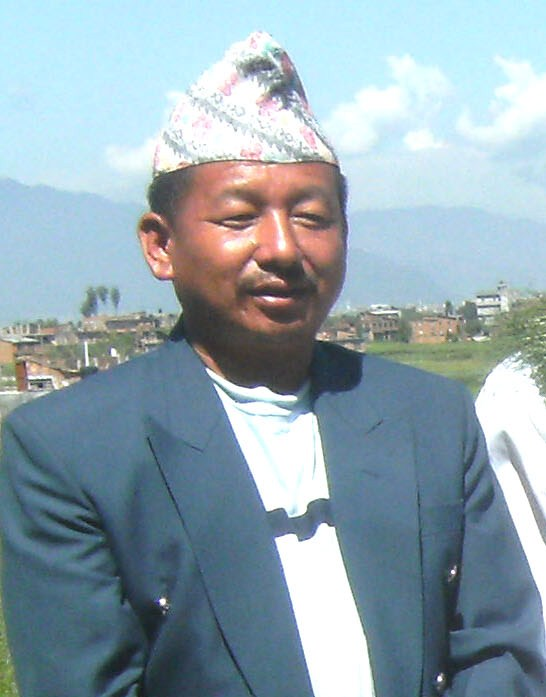
Rabin Rai - Founding Chairman of School

The former Chairman of School Management Board Rabin Rai, initiated the establishment of +2 school. He conducted meetings with local leaders, teachers, students, and made a common agenda for the school. He took the matter not only to the district level officials, but even to the central level in Kathmandu and gave the agenda to the Nepal government's Higher Education Council. He was able to justify the necessity of +2 school to the officials. Finally the school got approval to run the +2 classes. With support from all govt office levels and the help of funding from UK (Aamchowk Chautari), he was able to manage teachers and start the first badge of 11th grade in Balankha in 2066 B.S. Since then the new +2 school has played a key role in the region. It is running an education faculty with students of about 100 (both 11th and 12th grades) and four teachers.

Chandeswor Uchcha Ma Vi set the record among its peers in Bhojpur district in 11th grade examination of 2067 B.S. Out of 85 examinees 27 students passed the exam. This is merely 33% of the total but it is the highest percentage overall in Bhojpur district.

== Politics ==
=== Present ===
Local Election of 2017 elected Ashok Rai as new Chairman of Amchok municipality. He belongs to NCP Maoist Kendra. Now there is new government officer appointed to support the elected body. Previously the secretary of the Village Development Committee used to run the day-to-day administrative tasks. For security reason, the secretary used to work at District Headquarters Bhojpur.

The active political parties in this village town are Nepali Congress, CPN-UML, UCPN(M) and Rastriya Prajatantra Party.

== Balankha at Present ==
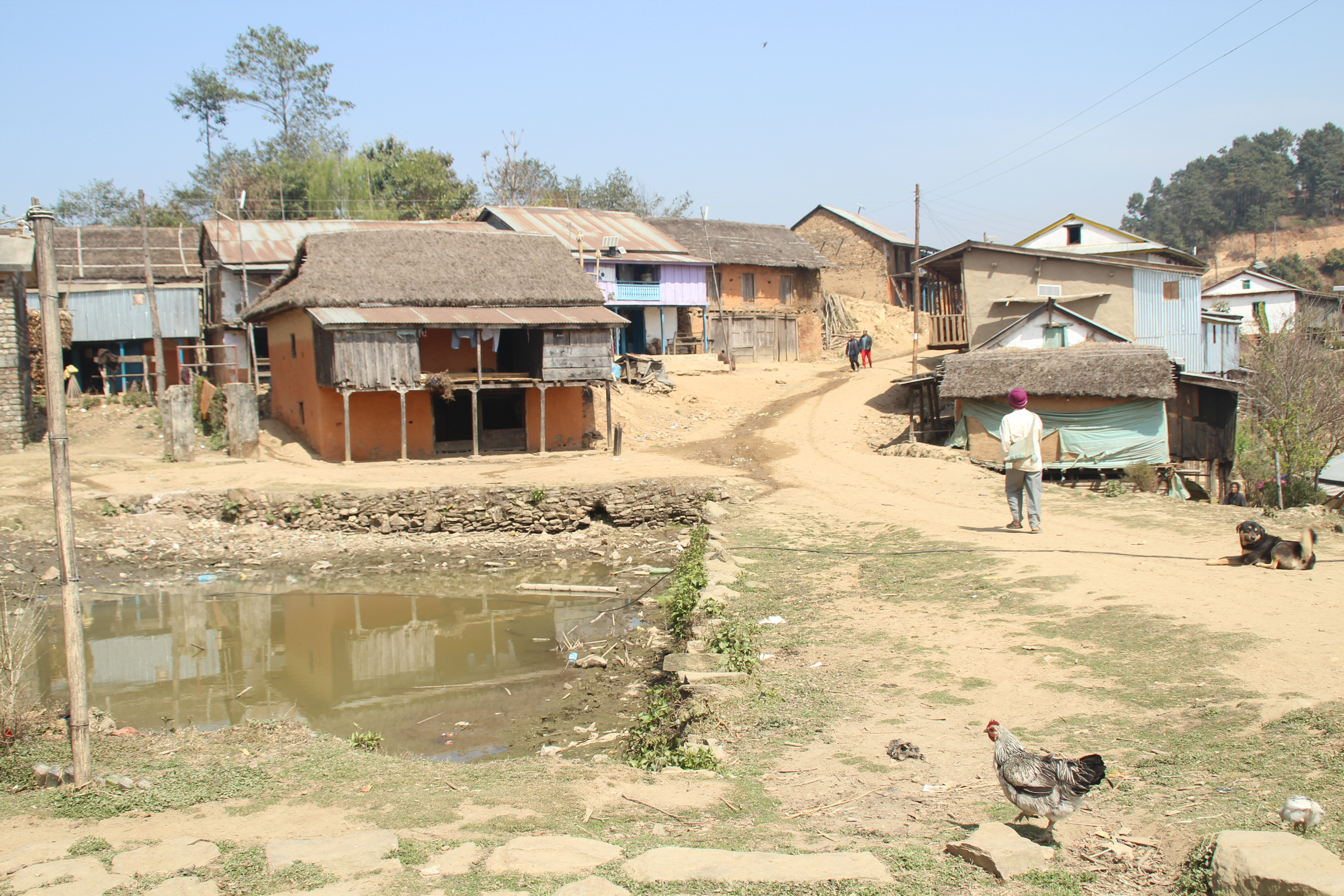
Padule pokhari

As the motor road is expanding to south and north, there is noticeable change in Balankha bazar. When the most difficult road construction at the Tare Bhir between Pangcha and Balankha was completed, it in fact, not only connected Balankha to whole Terai region but it also opened up a new possibilities of trade and transportation activities of this region which will eventually support the local economy. Thanks to the local committee of road construction who in support of Minister Sherdhan Rai received one million Rupees from the Road Department and carried out the construction. The only obstacle now is to build a motor bridge on Koshi river linking Ranitar of Udaypur. Balankha is now well connected to all the major hubs of Bhojpur and Khotang districts such as Ghoretar, Mane Bhanjyang, Chisapani, Katunje etc. Recently local transportation entrepreneurs have started services from Balankha to Beltar and Dharan via Ranitar.

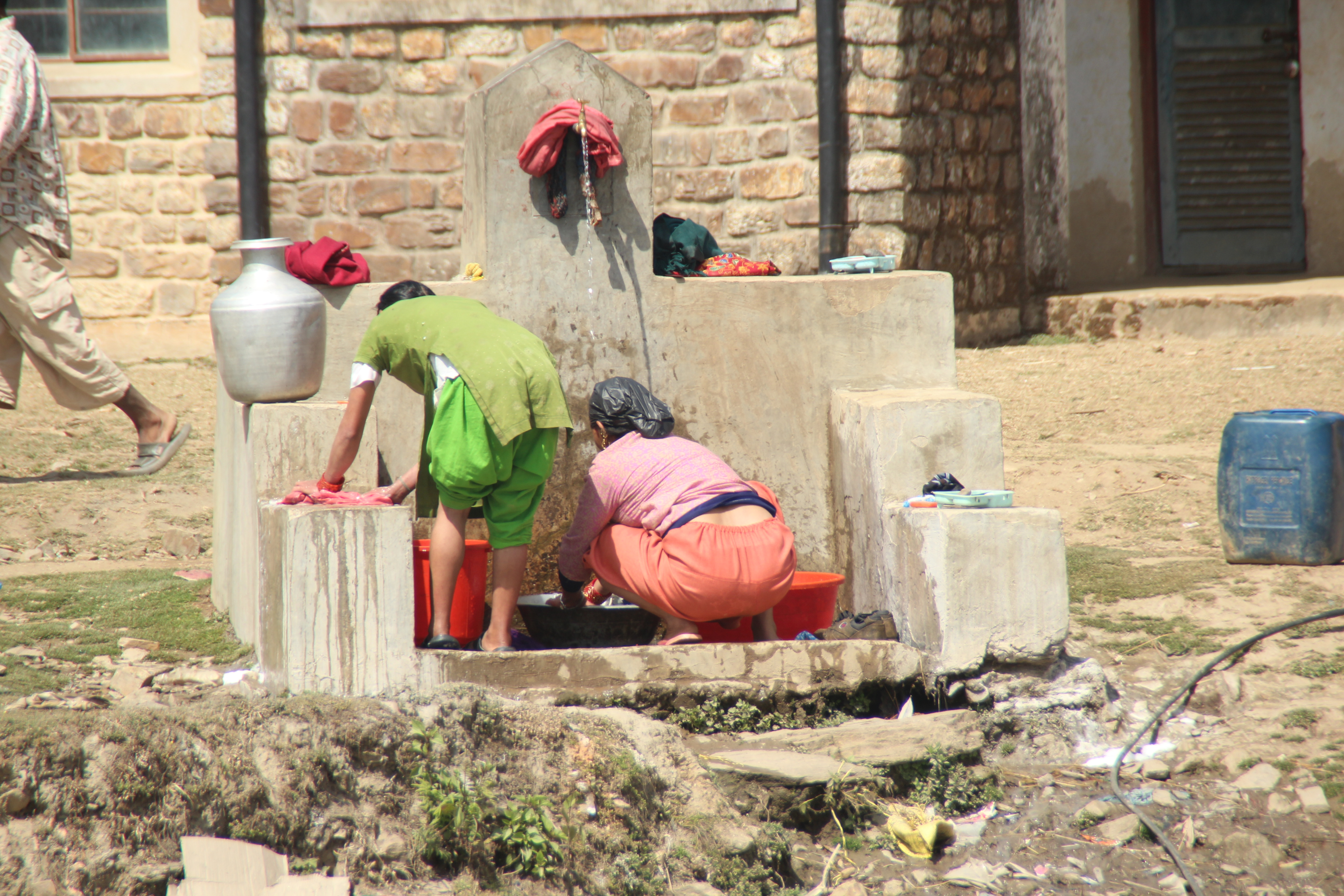
Water supply

Balankha bazar has become more vibrant now than it was few years ago when there was no road. It is seeing more offices and more shops, hotel, restaurants, various services such as remittance service, mobile service, computer service and internet services etc. Telecommunication towers are also being built in the private and public both sector. Police post and Health post have already been serving the locals for long time. Beside that local farmers have started to grow various types of cash crops.

Many people from Balankha and the surrounding area work abroad to support their family and village. Initially these remittances had to be collected in Ghoretar or Bhojpur, but thanks to a Western Bank partnership with Nabil Bank in 2013, locals can now receive money in digital wallets.

The Balankha Support Group (BSG) is one small group that has been trying to help Balankha too. Currently it is trying to provide books and set up a library for Chandeswor High School. Through social media like Facebook it has created a network among the people who are directly and indirectly related to Balankha and the surrounding area. In future it is aiming to contribute to other social issues of the region.

Offices in Balankha:

- Health Post (staffed by three health workers)
- Police Post (staffed with eleven personnel)
- Women Development organization
- Agricultural Development Branch
- Chandeswor Higher Secondary School (+2)

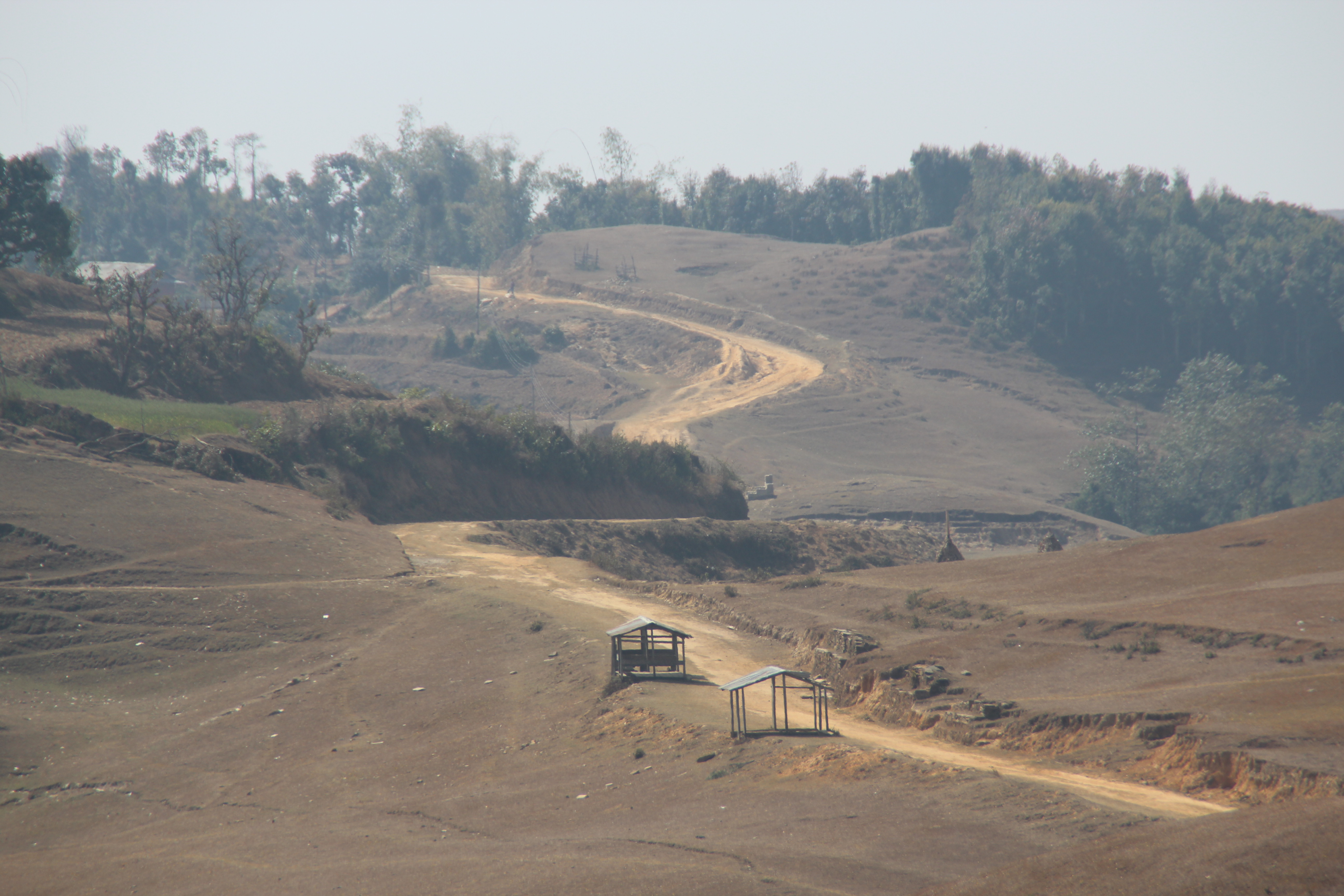
Road to Balankha

== Challenges ==
The road brought new possibilities for the growth of the bazar. Howeverthe growth comes with setbacks. As bazar grows, it needs enough Water Supply, proper Garbage and Drain system, Electricity or Solar power, uninterrupted Communication System, Health care facilities, Police Station and Emergency Services. The local authorities and bazar people should not be too late to focus on these infrastructure developments.

Other features such as Park, Sports ground, Wide street with side walk, tree plantation along the road and even proper building design and clean environment should also be considered, if Balankha wants to be a model town in the region.
