= Kulunga =

Kulung कुलुङ
- Village development committee
- Location in Nepal
- Coordinates: 27.44°N 87.11°E
- Country: Nepal
- Zone: Kosi Zone
- District: Bhojpur District

Population (1991)
  - Total: 4,095
- Time zone: UTC+5:45 (Nepal Time)

Kulung is a village development committee in Bhojpur District in the Kosi Zone of eastern Nepal. At the time of the 1991 Nepal census it had a population of 4095 persons living in 746 individual households. The postal code of Kulung bhojpur is 57001. The Kulung are one of the indigenous communities of Nepal, as well as parts of northeastern Sikkim and Darjeeling district of India, having their own Kulung language, culture, history and tradition. This name comes after their majority there but nowadays there is mixed locality.
