= Changre =

Changre चांगरे
- Village development committee
- Location in Nepal
- Coordinates: 27.15°N 87.14°E
- Country: Nepal
- Zone: Kosi Zone
- District: Bhojpur District

Population (1991)
  - Total: 3,344
- Time zone: UTC+5:45 (Nepal Time)

Changre is a village development committee in Bhojpur District in the Kosi Zone of eastern Nepal. At the time of the 1991 Nepal census it had a population of 3,344 persons living in 585 individual households.
