= Shyamsila =

Shyamsila श्यामसिला
- Village development committee
- Country: Nepal
- Zone: Kosi Zone
- District: Bhojpur District

Population (1991)
  - Total: 2,793
- Time zone: UTC+5:45 (Nepal Time)

Shyamsila is a village development committee in Bhojpur District in the Kosi Zone of eastern Nepal. At the time of the 1991 Nepal census it had a population of 2793.
