= Pawala =

Pawala पावला
- Village development committee
- Location in Nepal
- Coordinates: 26.97°N 87.03°E
- Country: Nepal
- Zone: Kosi Zone
- District: Bhojpur District

Population (1991)
  - Total: 1,431
- Time zone: UTC+5:45 (Nepal Time)

Pawala is a village development committee in Bhojpur District in the Kosi Zone of eastern Nepal. At the time of the 1991 Nepal census it had a population of 1431 persons living in 246 individual households.
