= Tiwari Bhanjyang =

Coordinates: 27°11′N 87°8′E

Tiwari Bhanjyang तिवारी भञ्ज्याङ
- Village Development Committee
- Interactive map of Tiwari Bhanjyang
- Country: Nepal
- Zone: Kosi Zone
- District: Bhojpur District

Population (1991)
  - Total: 3,004
- Time zone: UTC+5:45 (Nepal Time)
- Postal code: 57014
- Area code: 029

Tiwari Bhanjyang is a village development committee in Bhojpur District in the Kosi Zone of eastern Nepal. At the time of the 1991 Nepal census it had a population of 3004 persons living in 534 individual households. The mayor of this VDC is Samyog Dhakal.
