= Bhubal =

Bhubal भूबल
- Municipality
- Country: Nepal
- Province: Province No. 1
- District: Bhojpur District

Population (1991)
  - Total: 2,150
- Time zone: UTC+5:45 (Nepal Time)

Bhubal is a Village Development Committee in Bhojpur District in Province No. 1 of eastern Nepal. At the 1991 census Bhubal had a population of 2,150.
