= Dummana =

Dummana डुम्मना
- Municipality
- Location in Nepal
- Coordinates: 26.92°N 87.06°E
- Country: Nepal
- Zone: Kosi Zone
- District: Bhojpur District

Population (1991)
  - Total: 4,331
- Time zone: UTC+5:45 (Nepal Time)

Dummana is a village development committee in Bhojpur District in the Kosi Zone of eastern Nepal. At the time of the 1991 Nepal census it had a population of 4331 persons living in 731 individual households.
