= Manebhanjyang, Sankhuwasabha =

Manebhanjyang मानेभञ्ज्याङ
- Small City
- Location in Nepal
- Coordinates: 27°22′N 87°13′E
- Country: Nepal
- Zone: Kosi Zone
- District: Sankhuwasabha District

Population (1991)
  - Total: 3,018
- Time zone: UTC+5:45 (Nepal Time)
- Postal code: 56900
- Area code: 029

Manebhanjyang is a small town which lies in Khandbari Municipality of Sankhuwasabha District in the Kosi Zone of Eastern Nepal.
