= Hatuwagadhi Rural Municipality =

Hatuwagadhi हतुवागढी
- Rural Municipality (गाउँपालिका)
- Location in Koshi Province Hatuwagadhi (Nepal)
- Coordinates: 27.021541°N 87.120856°E
- Province: Koshi Province
- District: Bhojpur
- Established: 10 March 2017
- Seat: Ranibas, Ghodetar

Government
  - Type: Gaunpalika
  - Chairperson: Mr.Prem Kumar Rai (NCP)
  - Vice-chairperson: vacant

Area
  - Total: 142.61 km^{2} (55.06 sq mi)
- Elevation: 1,540 m (5,050 ft)

Population (2011)
  - Total: 20,543
  - Density: 144.05/km^{2} (373.09/sq mi)
- Time zone: UTC+5:45 (Nepal Standard Time)
- Postal Code: 57000
- Website: official website

Hatuwagadhi (Nepali: हतुवागढी) is one of 7 rural municipalities of Bhojpur District of Koshi Province of Nepal. There are a total of 9 municipalities in Bhojpur of which 2 are urban and 7 are rural.

Hatuwagadhi has an area of 142.61 square kilometres (55.06 mi^{2}) and the total population of the municipality is 20,543 as of Census of Nepal 2011.

Hatuwagadhi was known as Majh Kirant (kirat Rai’s) kingdom before the unification of Nepal by Shah Kings. It was capital of Kirat Kingdom. The ruins of the ancient capital and forts still exist at Hatuwagadhi.

== Climate ==
Climate data for Tribeni, Hatuwagadhi, elevation 143 m (469 ft)
Month	Jan	Feb	Mar	Apr	May	Jun	Jul	Aug	Sep	Oct	Nov	Dec	Year
Mean daily maximum °C (°F)	23.1 (73.6)	26.1 (79.0)	31.5 (88.7)	34.8 (94.6)	34.5 (94.1)	33.6 (92.5)	32.3 (90.1)	32.4 (90.3)	31.7 (89.1)	31.4 (88.5)	28.6 (83.5)	24.4 (75.9)	30.4 (86.7)
Mean daily minimum °C (°F)	10.8 (51.4)	12.0 (53.6)	16.1 (61.0)	20.5 (68.9)	23.1 (73.6)	25.0 (77.0)	25.2 (77.4)	24.9 (76.8)	23.9 (75.0)	21.4 (70.5)	15.3 (59.5)	11.0 (51.8)	19.1 (66.4)
Average precipitation mm (inches)	16.1 (0.63)	15.6 (0.61)	21.5 (0.85)	57.8 (2.28)	129.3 (5.09)	299.6 (11.80)	485.1 (19.10)	353.1 (13.90)	284.3 (11.19)	78.3 (3.08)	10.3 (0.41)	5.5 (0.22)	1,756.5 (69.16)
Source 1: Australian National University
Source 2: Japan International Cooperation Agency (precipitation)
