= Gogane, Bhojpur =

Gogane गोगने
- Village Development Committee
- Interactive map of Gogane
- Country: Nepal
- Zone: Kosi Zone
- District: Bhojpur District

Population (1991)
  - Total: 2,283
- Time zone: UTC+5:45 (Nepal Time)

Gogane is a Village Development Committee in Bhojpur District in the Kosi Zone of eastern Nepal. At the time of the 1991 Nepal census it had a population of 2283 persons residing in 415 individual households.
