= Mulpani, Bhojpur =

Mulpani, Kosi मूलपानी
- Village development committee
- Location in Nepal
- Coordinates: 27.37°N 87.13°E
- Country: Nepal
- Zone: Kosi Zone
- District: Bhojpur District

Population (1991)
  - Total: 3,438
- Time zone: UTC+5:45 (Nepal Time)

Mulpani is a village development committee in Bhojpur District in the Kosi Zone of eastern Nepal. At the time of the 1991 Nepal census it had a population of 3,438 persons living in 705 individual households.
