= Kot, Bhojpur =

Kot, Bhojpur कोट
- Village development committee
- Location in Nepal
- Coordinates: 27.16°N 87.00°E
- Country: Nepal
- Zone: Kosi Zone
- District: Bhojpur District

Population (1991)
  - Total: 4,485
- Time zone: UTC+5:45 (Nepal Time)

Kot is a village development committee in Bhojpur District in the Kosi Zone of eastern Nepal. At the time of the 1991 Nepal census it had a population of 4485.
