= Dhodalekhani =

Coordinates: 27°5′N 87°0′E

Dhodalekhani धोदलेखानी
- Rural Municipal Council
- Interactive map of Dhodalekhani
- Country: Nepal
- Zone: Kosi Zone
- District: Bhojpur District

Population (1991)
  - Total: 2,412
- Time zone: UTC+5:45 (Nepal Time)

Dhodalekhani is a village development committee in Bhojpur District in the Kosi Zone of eastern Nepal. At the time of the 1991 Nepal census it had a population of 2,412 persons living in 455 individual households.
