= Nagi, Bhojpur =

Nagi, Nepal नागी
- Village Development Committee
- Country: Nepal
- Zone: Kosi Zone
- District: Bhojpur District

Population (1991)
  - Total: 1,609
- Time zone: UTC+5:45 (Nepal Time)

Nagi is a Village Development Committee in Bhojpur District in the Kosi Zone of eastern Nepal. At the time of the 1991 Nepal census it had a population of 1609 persons residing in 294 individual households.
