= Khawa =

Khawa खावा
- Village development committee
- Location in Nepal
- Coordinates: 27.18°N 86.95°E
- Country: Nepal
- Zone: Kosi Zone
- District: Bhojpur District

Population (1991)
  - Total: 2,610
- Time zone: UTC+5:45 (Nepal Time)

Khawa is a village development committee in Bhojpur District in the Kosi Zone of eastern Nepal. At the time of the 1991 Nepal census it had a population of 2610 persons living in 494 individual households.
