= Bhulke =

Bhulke भुल्के
- Village development committee
- Location in Nepal
- Coordinates: 27.11°N 87.01°E
- Country: Nepal
- Zone: Kosi Zone
- District: Bhojpur District

Population (2001)
  - Total: 2,847
- Time zone: UTC+5:45 (Nepal Time)
- Postal code: 57010
- Area code: 029

Bhulke is a Village Development Committee in Bhojpur District in the Kosi Zone of eastern Nepal. At the 2001 census, its population was 2,847 inhabitants in 513 individual households.
