= Champe =

Champe चम्पे
- Village development committee
- Location in Nepal
- Coordinates: 27.23°N 87.15°E
- Country: Nepal
- Zone: Kosi Zone
- District: Bhojpur District

Population (1991)
  - Total: 2,974
- Time zone: UTC+5:45 (Nepal Time)

Champe is a village development committee in Bhojpur District in the Kosi Zone of eastern Nepal. At the time of the 1991 Nepal census it had a population of 2974 persons living in 561 individual households.
