= Kimalung =

Kimalung किमालुङ
- Village development committee
- Location in Nepal
- Coordinates: 27.31°N 87.05°E
- Country: Nepal
- Zone: Kosi Zone
- District: Bhojpur District

Population (1991)
  - Total: 1,594
- Time zone: UTC+5:45 (Nepal Time)

Kimalung, (English: Keemalung), is a village development committee in Bhojpur District in the Kosi Zone of eastern Nepal. At the time of the 1991 Nepal census it had a population of 1,594 persons living in 293 individual households.
