= Khartimchha =

Khartimchha खार्तिम्छा
- Municipality
- Location in Nepal
- Coordinates: 27.34°N 87.05°E
- Country: Nepal
- Zone: Kosi Zone
- District: Bhojpur District

Population (1991)
  - Total: 1,847
- Time zone: UTC+5:45 (Nepal Time)

Khartimchha is a village development committee in Bhojpur District in the Kosi Zone of eastern Nepal. At the time of the 1991 Nepal census it had a population of 1847.
