= Dewantar =

Dewantar देवानटार
- Village development committee
- Location in Nepal
- Coordinates: 26.98°N 87.07°E
- Country: Nepal
- Zone: Kosi Zone
- District: Bhojpur District

Population (1991)
  - Total: 3,800
- Time zone: UTC+5:45 (Nepal Time)

Dewantar is a village development committee in Bhojpur District in the Kosi Zone of eastern Nepal. At the time of the 1991 Nepal census, it had a population of 3800 persons living in 685 individual households.
