= Jarayotar, Bhojpur =

Coordinates: 27°10′N 87°14′E

Jarayotar जरायोटार
- Village Development Committee (VDC)
- Interactive map of Jarayotar
- Country: Nepal
- Zone: Kosi Zone
- District: Bhojpur District

Area
  - Total: 38.56 km^{2} (14.89 sq mi)

Population (2011)
  - Total: 4,031
  - Density: 104.5/km^{2} (270.8/sq mi)
- Time zone: UTC+5:45 (Nepal Time)

Jarayotar is a Village Development Committee in Bhojpur District in the Kosi Zone of eastern Nepal. According to the 2011 Nepal census, it had a population of 4,031 across 721 households. Local tradition suggests that the area was once a dense forest inhabited by numerous animals, including abundant antelope (known as "Jarayo" in Nepali). Over time, the land was cleared, forming plains. The village's name, Jarayotar, is believed to derive from this history.
