= Charambi =

Charambi चरम्बी
- Village development committee
- Location in Nepal
- Coordinates: 27.20°N 87.21°E
- Country: Nepal
- Zone: Kosi Zone
- District: Bhojpur District

Population (1991)
  - Total: 3,331
- Time zone: UTC+5:45 (Nepal Time)

Charambi is a village development committee in Bhojpur District in the Kosi Zone of eastern Nepal. At the time of the 1991 Nepal census, it had a population of 3331 people living in 604 individual households.
