= Chaukidanda =

Chaukidanda चौकीडाँडा
- Local administrative body
- Location in Nepal
- Coordinates: 27.43°N 87.06°E
- Country: Nepal
- Province No.-: 1
- District: Bhojpur District Local Administrative Body- Salpasilichho Rural Municipality Ward No. = 3

Population (2021)
  - Total: 1,931
- Time zone: UTC+5:45 (Nepal Time)

Chaukidanda is an administrative headquarter of Salpasilichho Rural Municipality in Bhojpur District in Koshi province, eastern Nepal. It is ward no.3 of the newly formed Salpasilichho Rural Municipality in the northern part of the district. Multiple construction projects for the municipality are underway, including land revenue office, hospitals, and agricultural service centers.

Nabil Bank, a class "A" bank, operates a branch here providing a full range of services.

Sankhuwa-sabha district lies to the north of Chaukidanda. To the east lies Kulung, to the south are Nepaledanda and Kudak kaule, and to the west is the Khatamma local ward level body lies. Chaukidanda is trekking route to Khumbu area of Solukhumbu district from east Nepal. Gothebazar is a major tourist attraction located towards Namchebazar. Taal is another beautiful spot in Chaukidanda for trekking. It is a fertile are well-suited to grow rice and vegetables. Cinnamon, Rudrakshaya production has also become important in recent days. The climate is pleasant and the altitude is appropriate for the growth of citrus fruits like orange and lemon.

It is now slowly transitioning into a town. Four mini hydro-electricity projects provide electricity to the town and a recently constructed road provides access to vehicles. Facilities for higher secondary school, health, post, rice mills, libraries and government offices are also available. Three power projects, totaling forty five mega watts, have been proposed on Irkhuwa river, which flows through the town. These power projects have received survey licenses from the Electricity Development Board of Nepalese Government. Investments, surveys and work for these projects are now underway.

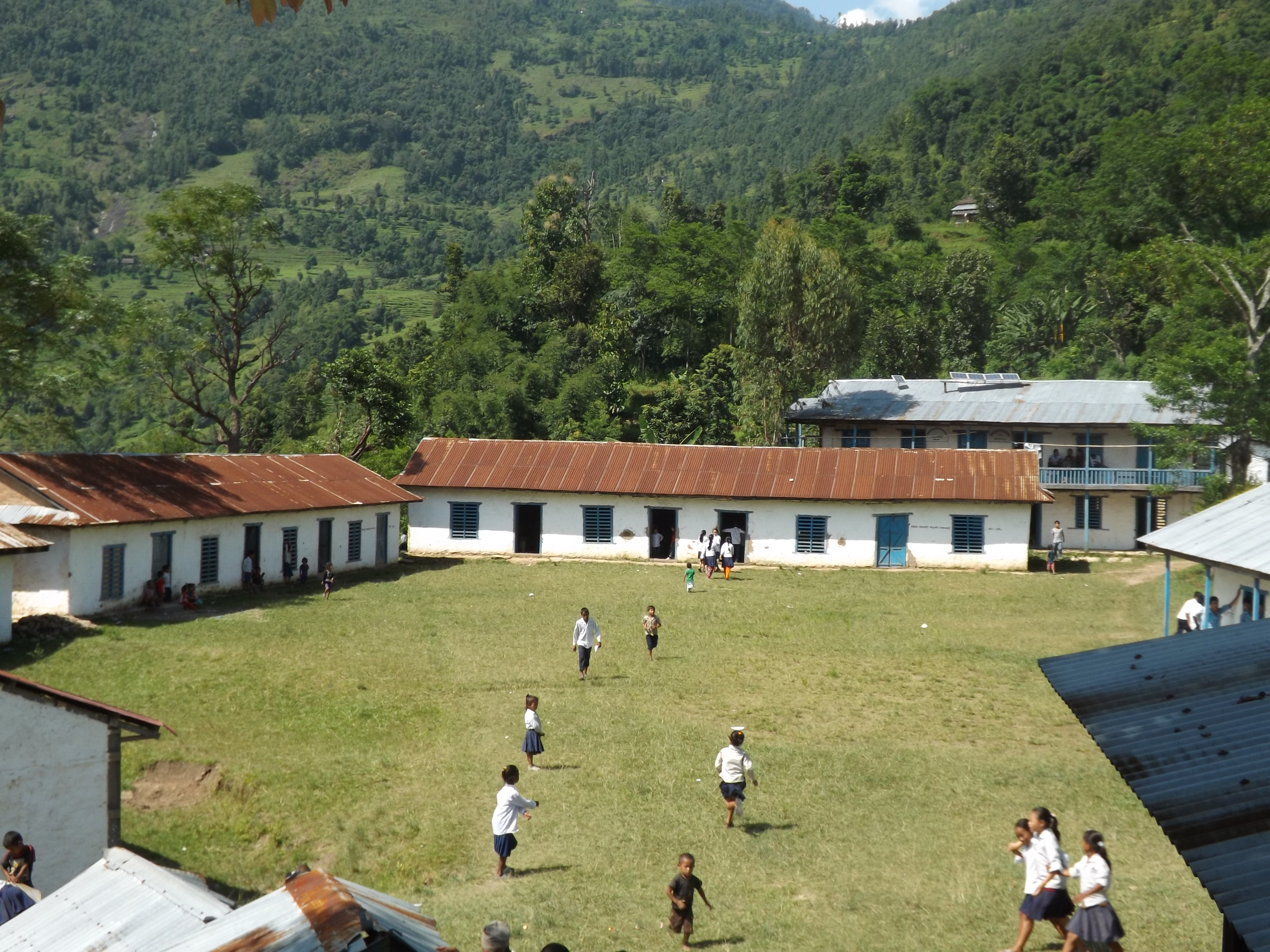

Women Development, a government funded organization is another organization which is actively working in Chaukidanda. It conducts training programs and organizes various cultural programs during national and local holiday. It has been praised for providing training in the production of local goods and handicrafts, and has become a prominent institution in the empowerment of women.

There are two social organizations actively working in Chaukidanda. Janata Club, Gopinichaur and Indrawati Youth Club, Tintama are main social organizations which are working for "change for good" in society. These clubs worked not only in social sector but also worked in education, health awareness, sports activities, cultural programs too. People of Chaukidanda love these clubs.

At the time of the 2021 Nepal census it has a population of 1931 persons.
