= Dobhane =

Dobhane दोभाने
- Village Development Committee
- Interactive map of Dobhane
- Location in Nepal
- Coordinates: 27.38°N 86.98°E
- Country: Nepal
- Zone: Kosi Zone
- District: Bhojpur District

Population (1991)
  - Total: 4,760
- Time zone: UTC+5:45 (Nepal Time)
- Postal code: 57015
- Area code: 029

Dobhane is a village development committee in Bhojpur District in the Kosi Zone of eastern Nepal. At the time of the 1991 Nepal census it had a population of 4760 persons living in 860 individual households.

== Administrative history ==
Dobhane was formerly a Village Development Committee (VDC) in Bhojpur District. Following the restructuring of Nepal's local government system after the promulgation of the Constitution of Nepal in 2015, the former Dobhane VDC was incorporated into Salpasilichho Rural Municipality. The former wards 5–9 of Dobhane form ward 5 of Salpasilichho, while former wards 1-4 form ward 6. Salpasilichho Rural Municipality was formed by incorporating the former VDCs of Dobhane, Khatamma, Chaukidanda and Kulunga. Its administrative centre is at Chaukidanda.
