= Pakali =

Pakali पकली
- Village development committee
- Location in Nepal
- Coordinates: 26.68°N 87.23°E
- Country: Nepal
- Zone: Koshi Zone
- District: Sunsari District

Population (1991)
  - Total: 9,500
- Time zone: UTC+5:45 (Nepal Time)

Pakali is part of sub-metropolitan city Itahari, in the Kosi Zone of south-eastern Nepal. At the 1991 Nepal census it had a population of 9500.
