= Dalgaun =

Dalgaun दलगाउँ
- Village development committee
- Location in Nepal
- Coordinates: 27.14°N 87.02°E
- Country: Nepal
- Zone: Kosi Zone
- District: Bhojpur District

Population (1991)
  - Total: 2,412
- Time zone: UTC+5:45 (Nepal Time)

Dalgaun is a village development committee in Bhojpur District in the Kosi Zone of eastern Nepal. At the time of the 1991 Nepal census it had a population of 2,412 persons living in 521 individual households.
