= Baikunthe =

Baikunthe बैकुण्ठे
- VDC (1990-2017)
- Location in Nepal Baikunthe (Nepal)
- Country: Nepal
- Province: Province No. 1
- District: Bhojpur District

Population (1991)
  - Total: 3,167
- Time zone: UTC+5:45 (Nepal Time)

Baikunthe Nepali: बैकुण्ठे is a village development committee in Bhojpur District in the Kosi Zone of eastern Nepal. At the 1991 census, it had a population of 3,167 persons in 575 individual households.

== Geography ==
The village is located at an elevation of 5,400 feet (1,645 m) above sea level. However, the elevation differs from place to place. For example, Kiba- 1950 m, Kholakharka-1650 m, Dingla-1610 m, Sirise-1125 m, Sagrbas- 1570 m, Chaapgau- 1430 m, and Kuwapani 1498 m. A small river called Makuwa Khola flows through the bottom of the Baikunthe village. This is the main source of water for agriculture. This river is also a source of recreation for youngsters who like swimming and fishing in fresh water.

== Economy ==
The economy is primarily agricultural. Farmers grow rice, millet, legumes and vegetables. Cows, goats and buffaloes are some of the pet animals that people prefer to farm. Long time ago, people used to grow cotton in the farm and make the clothes from it in local level. However, the clothes industry died as people started to use imported clothes from modern industry in other places. Most people of this village depend on farming for their life. Few of them are also in professions like teaching, sewing, iron and leather works.

== Demographics ==
At the time of the 1991 Nepal census Baikunthe had had a population of 3167 persons living in 575 individual households. The population consists of Kshetris, Darjis, Rais, Biswokarmas, Brahmins, Magars and Ramtels. The Kshetris and Rais make up the high percentage of the population of the village. Darjis, Ramtel and Bishwokarma are in minorities.

== School ==
People here are aware of education. Most of the youths from this village have completed school level education. The children go to Shree Savitra Secondary School up to grade-10. The school was established as a primary school in ~ 1970s and upgraded to secondary level in recent years. For further education, students go to the Bhojpur Multiple Campus, 10+2s in nearby places or big cities like Dharan, Biratnagar and Kathmandu. A significant number of students graduated from this school are either serving the same or other schools as teaching staff after having Bachelor/Associate degree from different colleges. Few of them are working in armed forces, own business, or working in home or other countries as skilled and unskilled worker category.

== Hospital ==
The village has a health post where the residents get free primary care. Health post is run by a health assistant.

== Animal hospital ==
This village has an animal hospital for treatment of injured animals.

== Transportation ==
The village had no means of transportation until recently. There were no roads for bicycle or bus. However, it is connected recently to other nearby villages by unpaved roads.

== Postal service ==
The village has a post office to deliver incoming or outgoing letters and packages.

== Communication ==
The village used to have only few radio sets in 1970 s and 1980s as means of communications. However, in recent years telephones and mobile phones are common.

== Electricity ==
Recently, this village began producing electricity from hydro power. The electricity is helping the village to enter in modern age of computations and Internet.
