= Ranibas, Bhojpur =

Ranibas रानीबास
- village development committee
- Location in Nepal
- Coordinates: 27.04°N 87.11°E
- Country: Nepal
- Zone: Kosi Zone
- District: Bhojpur District

Population (1991)
  - Total: 5,950
- Time zone: UTC+5:45 (Nepal Time)
- Postal code: 57012
- Area code: 029

Ranibas is a village development committee in Bhojpur District in the Kosi Zone of eastern Nepal. At the time of the 1991 Nepal census it had a population of 5950 persons living in 1152 individual households.
