= Deurali, Bhojpur =

Deurali, Kosi देउराली
- Former Village Development Committee (पूर्व गाउँ विकास समिति)
- Location in Nepal
- Coordinates: 27.30°N 87.17°E
- Country: Nepal
- Zone: Kosi Zone
- District: Bhojpur District

Population (1991)
  - Total: 5,367
- Time zone: UTC+5:45 (Nepal Time)
- Postal code: 57003
- Area code: 029

Deurali is a village development committee in Bhojpur District in the Kosi Zone of eastern Nepal. At the time of the 1991 Nepal census it had a population of 5367 persons living in 1052 individual households.
