= Nepaledanda =

Nepaledanda नेपालेडाँडा
- Former Village Development Committee (पूर्व गाउँ विकास समिति)
- Location in Nepal
- Coordinates: 27.40°N 87.11°E
- Country: Nepal
- Zone: Kosi Zone
- District: Bhojpur District

Population (1991)
  - Total: 3,325
- Time zone: UTC+5:45 (Nepal Time)

Nepaledanda was a village development committee in Bhojpur District in the Kosi Zone of eastern Nepal. At the time of the 1991 Nepal census it had a population of 3325 persons living in 659 individual households.
