= Gupteswar Cave =

Shrine in Odisha, India

Gupteshwar Mahadev
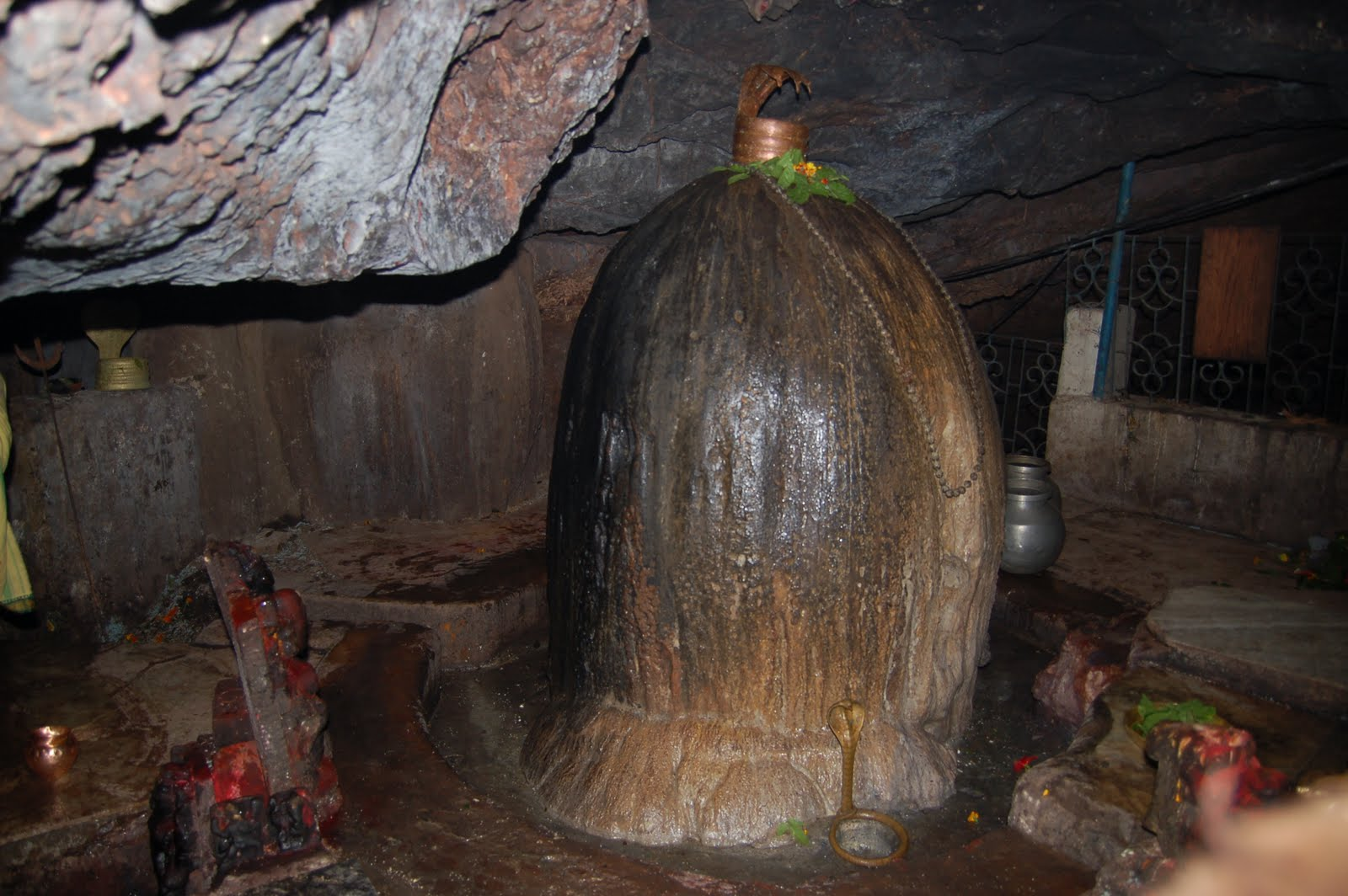

- Location in Odisha Location in India

Religion
- Affiliation: Hinduism
- Deity: Shiva
- Festival: Mahashivaratri

Location
- Location: Odisha
- Country: India
- Interactive map of Gupteshwar Mahadev
- Coordinates: 18.822571°N 82.167325°E

Architecture
- Type: Cave Temple
- Creator: Veer Vikram Dev
- Completed: mid 17th century

Specifications
- Temple: 2
- Elevation: 698.96 m (2,293 ft)

Gupteswar Cave is a cave shrine dedicated to Shiva, one of the key gods in Hinduism. It is a pilgrim site situated about 55 km (34 mi) away Jeypore, Koraput District in the state of Odisha, India. It is a limestone cave, and its main attraction is the gigantic Shiva Linga which is said to be increasing in size. It is believed that the cave was discovered by Rama and re-discovered in the reign of Maharajah Veer Vikram Dev. In the holy month of Shravan, the cave is visited by devotees who walk to the shrine bare-footed with decorated bamboo palanquins called "Kanwadiya" and bathe in the maha kund before worshipping Lord Gupteshwar. There are 200 steps to reach to the Shiva linga temple. Its entrance is about 3 metres (9.8 ft) wide and 2 metres (6.6 ft) high.

== Legend ==
Surrounded by a dense forest of sal trees and flanked by the Kolab river, a 2 metres (6.6 ft) high lingam stands in the cave. The shrine is called "Gupteswar" which means the "God in hiding" because the lingam remained undiscoverable for a long time. One can reach it by climbing the 200 steps flanked with rows of champak trees. There are also several other caves nearby. Inside the second cave, there is a large stalactite. People worship it as the udder of God Kamadhenu (the divine cow) and wait under it with outstretched palms to collect drops of water which fall only at long intervals.

Popularly known as "Gupta Kedar" in the vicinity, this sacred place is associated with the Hindu god, Lord Shri Rama. The nearby hill has been named "Ramagiri". According to tradition, the lingam was first discovered by Lord Rama when he was roaming in the Dandakaranya forest with wife Sita and brother Lakshman, and named the deity in the cave as "Gupteshwar". The poet Kalidas too, described the scenic beauty of Ramgiri forest where the cave temple is referred to in his famous Meghadutam.

However, as the time passed, the temple was again lost in obscurity but in the 17th century, the Shiva lingam was discovered by a hunter who then informed about it to Maharajah Veer Vikram Dev, who was the king of that region and recently shifted his capital from Nandapur to the newly formed, Jeypore. King Veer Vikram paid a visit to the cave and was mesmerized by the grandiosity of the majestic lingam and the magnificent natural surroundings. He appointed priests in the cave temple and started a tradition of making a foot journey to the cave of Lord Gupteswar during the holy month of Shraavana which is performed by the people of the erstwhile kingdom to this day. Since then the lingam has been worshipped by the tribes and locals of Koraput region. In Shivaratri (a Hindu festival) Gupteswar Temple draws over 200,000 devotees from Odisha, Andhra Pradesh and Chhattisgarh. People suffering from incurable diseases come here to worship the god and remain here for months in the hope of getting cured.

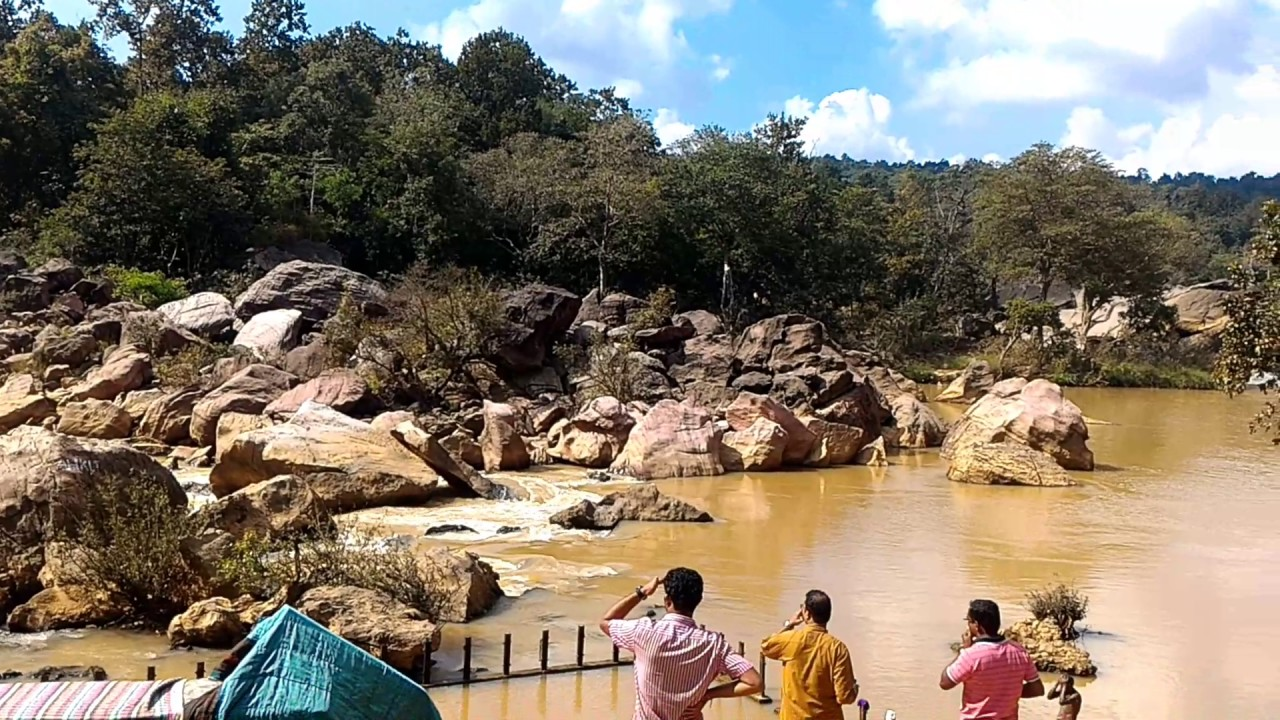
Sabari river bank, Gupteswara
