= Keurepani =

Keurepani केउरेपानी
- Former Village Development Committee (पूर्व गाउँ विकास समिति)
- Location in Nepal
- Coordinates: 27.35°N 87.17°E
- Country: Nepal
- Zone: Kosi Zone
- District: Bhojpur District

Population (1991)
  - Total: 4,098
- Time zone: UTC+5:45 (Nepal Time)

Keurepani is a village development committee in Bhojpur District in the Kosi Zone of eastern Nepal. At the time of the 1991 Nepal census it had a population of 4,098 persons living in 794 individual households.
