= Annapurna, Nepal =

Annapurna, Nepal अन्नपूर्ण
- Village development committee
- Location in Nepal
- Coordinates: 27.21°N 86.96°E
- Country: Nepal
- Province: Province No. 1
- District: Bhojpur District

Population (1991)
  - Total: 1,856
- Time zone: UTC+5:45 (Nepal Time)

Annapurna is a village development committee in Bhojpur District in Province No. 1 of eastern Nepal. At the 1991 Nepal census it had a population of 1,856 persons in 360 individual households.
