= Ranibas, Surkhet =

Ranibas, Bheri रानीबास
- Village development committee
- Location in Nepal
- Coordinates: 28.62°N 81.88°E
- Country: Nepal
- Zone: Bheri Zone
- District: Surkhet District

Population (1991)
  - Total: 2,695
- Time zone: UTC+5:45 (Nepal Time)
- Area code: 21700

Ranibas is a village development committee in Surkhet District in the Bheri Zone of mid-western Nepal. At the time of the 1991 Nepal census it had a population of 2695 people living in 443 individual households.
