= Tunggochha =

Coordinates: 27°20′N 87°6′E

Tungechha तुङगेछा Shadananda municipality ward no 8
- Former Village Development Committee (पूर्व गाउँ विकास समिति)
- Interactive map of Tungechha
- Country: Nepal
- Zone: Kosi Zone
- District: Bhojpur District

Population (1991)
  - Total: 2,446
- Time zone: UTC+5:45 (Nepal Time)

Tunggochha is a village development committee in Bhojpur District in the Kosi Zone of eastern Nepal. At the time of the 1991 Nepal census it had a population of 2446 persons living in 421 individual households.
