= Khatamma =

Khatamma खाटाम्मा
- Village development committee
- Location in Nepal
- Coordinates: 27.41°N 87.04°E
- Country: Nepal
- Zone: Kosi Zone
- District: Bhojpur District

Population (1991)
  - Total: 2,151
- Time zone: UTC+5:45 (Nepal Time)

Khatamma is a village development committee in Bhojpur District in the Kosi Zone of eastern Nepal. At the time of the 1991 Nepal census it had a population of 2,151 persons living in 407 individual households.
