= Yaku, Nepal =

Yaku, Nepal याकु
- Village
- Location in Nepal
- Coordinates: 27.15°N 87.19°E
- Country: Nepal
- Zone: Kosi Zone
- District: Bhojpur District

Population (1991)
  - Total: 3,086
- Time zone: UTC+5:45 (Nepal Time)
- Postal code: 57005
- Area code: 029

Yaku (याकु) is a village development committee in Bhojpur District in the Kosi Zone of eastern Nepal. It is inhabited mainly by Dhakal (श्रेष्ठ); a few other castes are found. Yaku is also known to be birta of the shresthas. It is a remote place and it has produced a number of well-known figures in Nepal, including academicians, bureaucrats and politicians.

At the time of the 1991 Nepal census it had a population of 3086 persons living in 537 individual households.
