= Chatara =

- Village
- Location in West Bengal, India Chatara (India)
- Coordinates: 22°22′45.6″N 87°52′41.1″E
- Country: India
- State: West Bengal
- District: Purba Medinipur

Population (2011)
  - Total: 4,868

Languages
  - Official: Bengali, English
- Time zone: UTC+5:30 (IST)
- PIN: 721 151
- Lok Sabha constituency: Tamluk
- Vidhan Sabha constituency: Tamluk
- Website: purbamedinipur.gov.in

Chatara is a village, in Sahid Matangini CD block in Tamluk subdivision of Purba Medinipur district in the state of West Bengal, India.

== Geography ==
Cities and towns in Tamluk subdivision of Purba Medinipur district
M: municipal city/ town, CT: census town, R: rural/ urban centre, H: historical/ religigious centre
Owing to space constraints in the small map, the actual locations in a larger map may vary slightly

=== CD block HQ ===
The headquarters of this CD block are located here.

=== Urbanisation ===
94.08% of the population of Tamluk subdivision live in the rural areas. Only 5.92% of the population live in the urban areas, and that is the second lowest proportion of urban population amongst the four subdivisions in Purba Medinipur district, just above Egra subdivision.

Note: The map alongside presents some of the notable locations in the subdivision. All places marked in the map are linked in the larger full screen map.

== Demographics ==
As per 2011 Census of India Chatara had a total population of 4,868 of which 2,498 (51%) were males and 2,370 (49%) were females. Population below 6 years was 551. The total number of literates in Chatara was 3,869 (89.62% of the population over 6 years).

== Transport ==
Mecheda-Tamluk-Haldia Road passes through Chatara.
