= Thulo Dumba =

Coordinates: 27°3′N 87°10′E

Thulo Dumba ठूलोदुङमा
- Village development committee
- Interactive map of Thulo Dumba
- Country: Nepal
- Zone: Kosi Zone
- District: Bhojpur District

Population (1991)
  - Total: 2,604
- Time zone: UTC+5:45 (Nepal Time)

Thulo Dumba is a village development committee in the Bhojpur District and the Kosi Zone of eastern Nepal. According to the 1991 Nepal census, it had a population of 2604 people living in 537 individual households.
