= Manebhanjyang, Bhojpur =

Mane Bhanjyang मानेभञ्ज्याङ
- Village development committee
- Location in Nepal
- Coordinates: 27.09°N 87.07°E
- Country: Nepal
- Province: Province No. 1
- District: Bhojpur District

Population (1991)
  - Total: 2,832
- Time zone: UTC+5:45 (Nepal Time)

Mane Bhanjyang is a village development committee in Bhojpur District in Province No. 1 of eastern Nepal. According to 1991 census, it had a population of 2,832 living in 503 individual households. Mane Bhanjyang is the birthplace and hometown of Nepal's former president, Bidhya Devi Bhandari.
