= Sano Dumba =

Coordinates: 27°6′N 87°13′E

Sano Dumma सानोदुङमा jimigaun
- Village development committee
- Nickname: tharpu
- Interactive map of Sano Dumma
- Country: Nepal
- Zone: Kosi Zone
- District: Bhojpur District

Population (1991)
  - Total: 2,761
- Time zone: UTC+5:45 (Nepal Time)
- Website: www.sanodumma.edu.np

Sano Dumba is a village development committee in Bhojpur District in the Kosi Zone of eastern Nepal. At the time of the 1991 Nepal census it had a population of 2761 persons living in 501 individual households.
