= Bastim =

Bastim बस्तीम
- Municipality
- Location in Nepal
- Coordinates: 27.12°N 87.13°E
- Country: Nepal
- Province: Province No. 1
- District: Bhojpur District

Population (1991)
  - Total: 2,920
- Time zone: UTC+5:45 (Nepal Time)
- Area code: 029

Bastim (English: Basteem) is a village development committee in Bhojpur District in Province No. 1 of eastern Nepal. At the 1991 census it had a population of 2,920 persons in 556 individual households.
