= Bhojpur District, Nepal =

Bhojpur District भोजपुर जिल्ला
- District
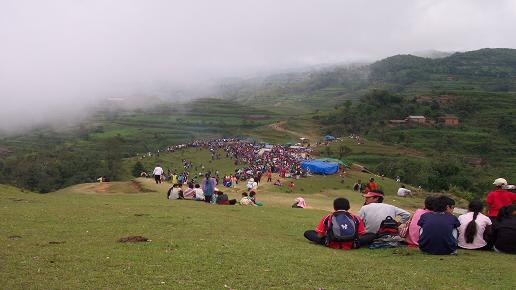
- Chandi Bazar: A famous spot of Kirat Rai Ubhauli festival in Balankha
- Nickname: Khikamakchha (खिकामाक्छा)
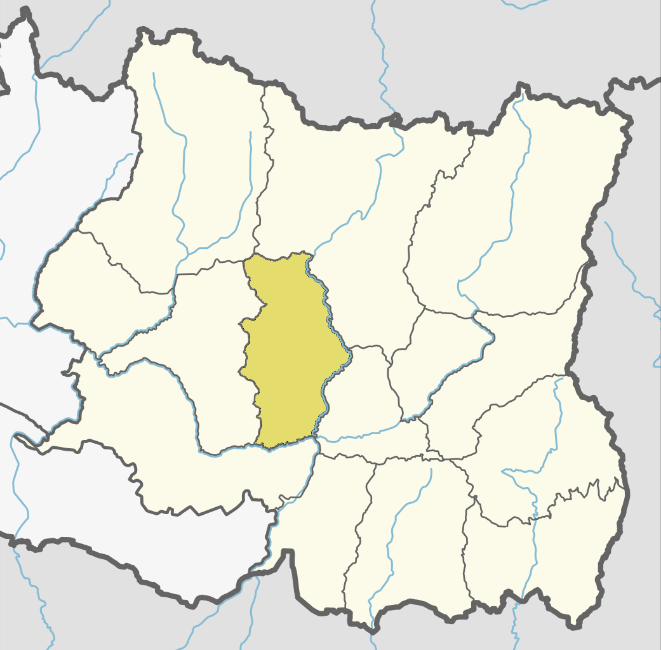
- Location of Bhojpur district

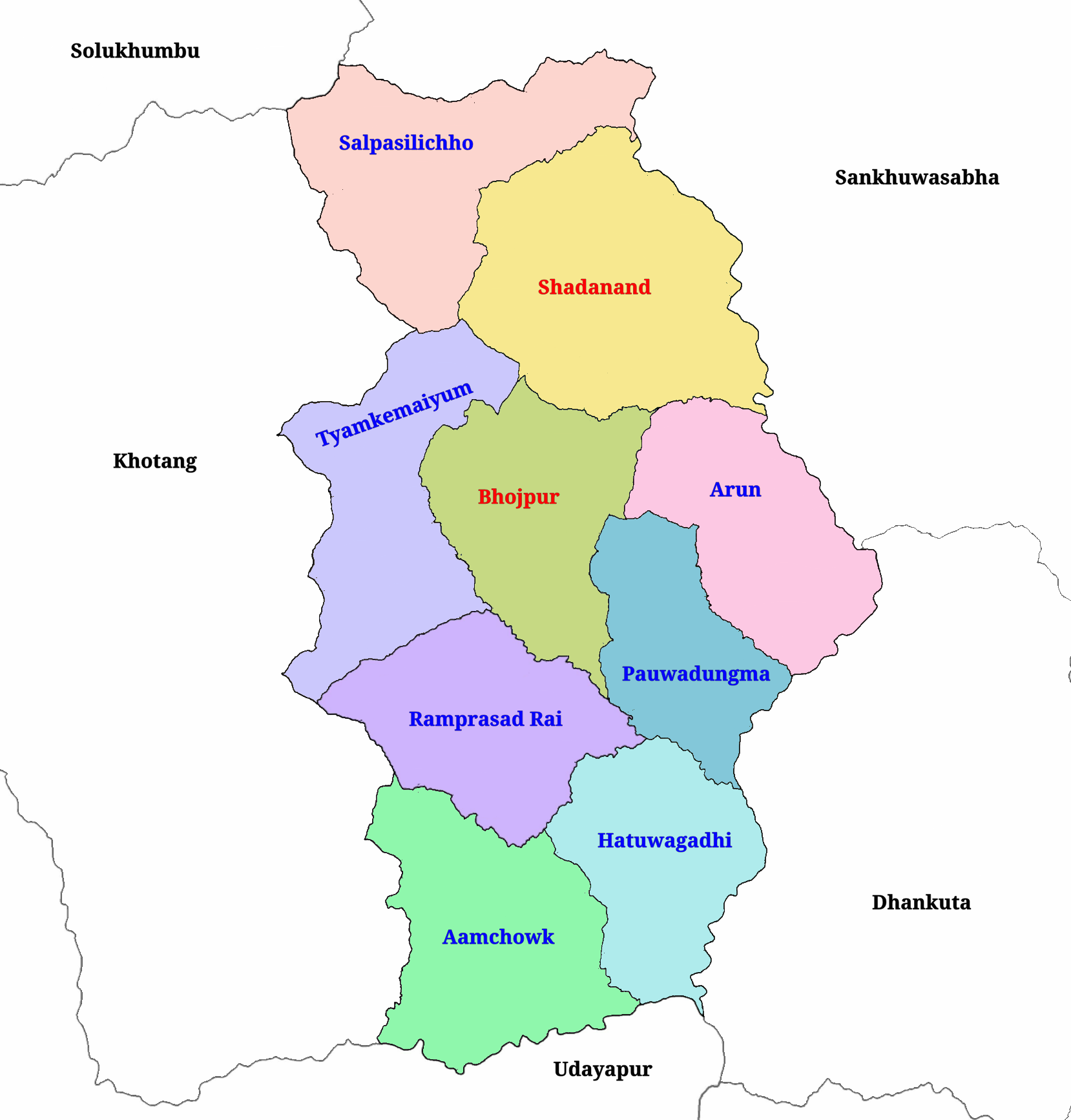
- Political division of Bhojpur
- Coordinates: 27°10′21″N 87°02′53″E
- Country: Nepal
- Province: Koshi Province
- Admin HQ.: Bhojpur
- Municipality: List: Urban; Bhojpur; Shadanand; Rural; Hatuwagadhi; Ramprasad Rai; Aamchok; Tyamke Maiyunm; Arun; Pauwadungma; Salpasilichho

Government
  - Type: Coordination committee
  - Body: DCC, Bhojpur
  - Head: Mr. Laxman Khadka
  - Deputy-Head: Mrs. Anisha Khadka
  - Parliamentary constituencies: 1
  - Provincial constituencies: 2

Area
  - Total: 1,507 km^{2} (582 sq mi)
- Highest elevation: 4,153 m (13,625 ft)
- Lowest elevation: 153 m (502 ft)

Population (2021)
  - Total: 157,923
  - Density: 104.8/km^{2} (271.4/sq mi)
  - Households: 39,393

Demographics
  - Ethnic groups: Rai; Chetri; Tamang
  - Female ♀: 53%
  - Male ♂/100 female: 89.96

Human Development Index
  - Income per capita (US dollars): $999
  - Poverty rate: 24.4
  - Literacy: 69%
  - Life Expectancy: 68.3
- Time zone: UTC+05:45 (NPT)
- Postal Codes: 57000, 57001..., 57015
- Telephone Code: 029
- Main Language(s): Nepali, Rai, Tamang
- Major highways: Mid-Hills Highway
- Website: ddcbhojpur.gov.np

Bhojpur District (Nepali: भोजपुर जिल्ला [bʱod͡zpur]) is one of 14 districts of Koshi Province of eastern Nepal. The district's area is 1,507 km^{2} with a population of 182,459 (2011). The administrative center is Bhojpur. It is surrounded by Dhankuta and Sankhuwasabha in the east, Khotang in the west, again Sankhuwasabha in north-east, Solukhumbu in the north-west and Udayapur in the South.

== Etymology ==
According to the District Coordination Committee Bhojpur, this place was named for the Himalayan birch (Betula utilis; Nepali भोजपत्र bhojpatra), which was found here in large quantities. Pur means 'city'.

== Geography and climate ==
Classified as a hill district, Bhojpur actually spans five of Nepal's eight climate zones. 3% of the district's area is below 300 meters elevation in the Lower Tropical zone and 31% is Upper Tropical from 300 to 1,000 meters. 50% of the land area belongs to the Subtropical Zone between 1,000 and 2,000 meters and 15% is Temperate (2,000 to 3,000 meters). 2% rises higher into the Subalpine Zone.

Climate Zone	Elevation Range	% of Area
Lower Tropical	below 300 meters (1,000 ft)	2.7%
Upper Tropical	300 to 1,000 meters 1,000 to 3,300 ft.	30.5%
Subtropical	1,000 to 2,000 meters 3,300 to 6,600 ft.	49.8%
Temperate	2,000 to 3,000 meters 6,400 to 9,800 ft.	15.1%
Subalpine	3,000 to 4,000 meters 9,800 to 13,100 ft.	1.7%

== Divisions ==
Bhojpur is divided into two urban and seven rural municipalities:

No.	Type	Name	Population (2011)	Area	Wards	Website
1	Urban	Bhojpur	28,107	159.51	12	
2	Urban	Shadanand	31,612	241	14	
3	Rural	Hatuwagadhi	20,404	142.61	9	
4	Rural	Ramprasad Rai	18,848	158.83	8	
5	Rural	Aamchok	18,720	184.89	10	
6	Rural	Tyamke Maiyunm	17,911	173.41	9	
7	Rural	Arun Gaunpalika	17,687	154.76	7	
8	Rural	Pauwadungma	15,394	118.86	6	
9	Rural	Salpasilichho	13,111	193.33	6	
	District	Bhojpur	182,459	1,507	81	

=== Towns and villages (former VDC) ===
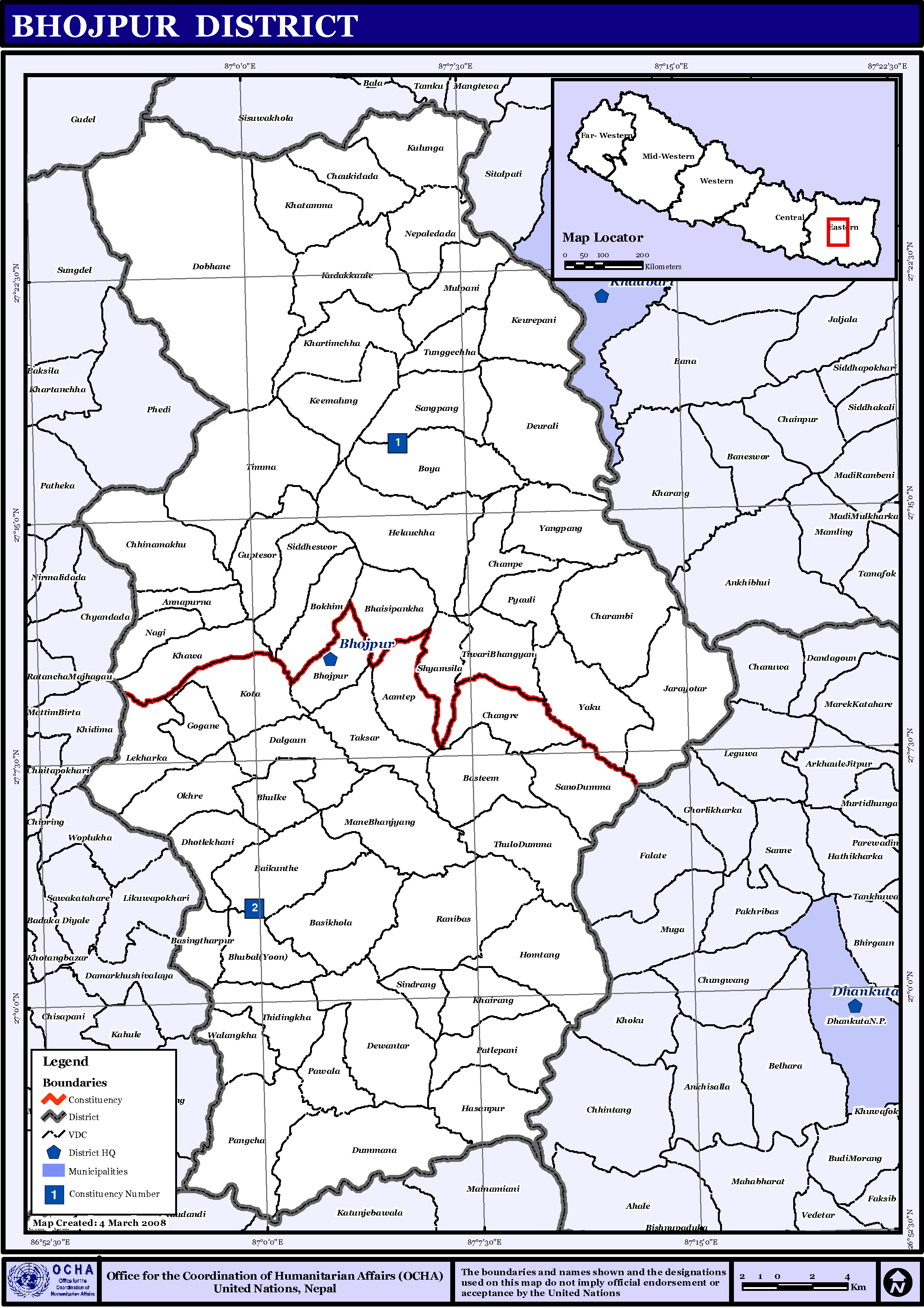
Map of the VDC/s in Bhojpur District

- Aangtep
- Annapurna
- Baikunthe
- Balankha
- Basikhora
- Basingtharpu
- Bastim
- Bhaisipankha
- Bhubal
- Bhulke
- Bokhim
- Bhojpur
- Boya
- Champe
- Changre
- Charambi
- Chaukidanda
- Chhinamakhu
- Dalgaun
- Deurali
- Dewantar
- Dhodalekhani
- Dobhane
- Dummana
- Gogane
- Gupteshwar
- Hasanpur
- Helauchha
- Homtang
- Jarayotar
- Kimalung
- Keurepani
- Khairang
- Khartimchha
- Khatamma
- Khawa
- Kot
- Kudak Kaule
- Kulunga
- Lekharka
- Mane Bhanjyang
- Mulpani
- Nagi
- Nepaledada
- Okhre
- Pangcha
- Patle Pani
- Pawala
- Pyauli
- Ranibas
- Sangpang
- Sano Dumba
- Shadanand Municipality
- Shyamsila
- Siddheshwar
- Sindrang
- Syamsila
- Taksar
- Thidingkha
- Thulo Dumba
- Timma
- Tiwari Bhanjyang
- Tunggochha
- Yaku
- Yangpang

== Demographics ==
Historical population
Census year	Pop.	±% p.a.
1981	192,689	—
1991	198,784	+0.31%
2001	203,018	+0.21%
2011	182,459	−1.06%
2021	157,923	−1.43%

At the 2021 Nepal census, Bhojpur District had a population of 157,923. Bhojpur had a literacy rate of 78.9% and a sex ratio of 1,019 females per 1,000 males. 55,349 (35.05%) lived in urban areas.

Ethnicity/caste of Bhojpur district (2021)
1. Rai (36.3%)
2. Chhetri (17.7%)
3. Tamang (10.8%)
4. Newar (7.65%)
5. Magar (4.94%)
6. Bahun (4.58%)
7. Kami (3.76%)
8. Damai (3.50%)
9. Sarki (3.01%)
10. Bhujel (1.88%)
11. Sherpa (1.76%)
12. Other Hill Janjati (3.66%)
13. Others (0.51%)

Ethnicity/caste: 36.31% of the population were Rai, 17.66% Chhetri, 10.78% Tamang, 7.65% Newar, 4.94% Magar, 4.58% Bahun, 4.27% Kami, 2.70% Damai, 2.44% Sarki, 1.88% Bhujel and 1.76% Sherpa.

Religion in Bhojpur District (2021)
Religion	Percent
Hinduism	46.39%
Kirat Mundhum	36.29%
Buddhism	16.04%
Christianity	1.21%
Other or not stated	0.07%

Religion: 46.39% were Hindu, 36.29% Kirati, 16.04% Buddhist,1.21% Christian and 0.07% others.

Languages of Bhojpur district (2021)
1. Nepali (47.6%)
2. Bantawa (20.0%)
3. Tamang (7.48%)
4. Magar Dhut (3.52%)
5. Newari (3.29%)
6. Kulung (2.90%)
7. Dungmali (2.69%)
8. Sampang (2.19%)
9. Rai (1.86%)
10. Sherpa (1.50%)
11. Chamling (1.49%)
12. Others (5.41%)

As their first language, 47.81% of the population spoke Nepali, 20.04% Bantawa, 7.48% Tamang, 3.52% Magar, 3.29% Newari, 2.90% Kulung, 2.69% Dungmali, 2.19% Sampang, 1.86% Rai, 1.50% Sherpa, 1.49% Chamling. In 2011, 49.08% of the population spoke Nepali as their first language.

== 2015 Nepal earthquake ==
The district was affected by an earthquake on 25 April 2015.

== See also ==
- Zones of Nepal
