= Kosi Zone =

Coordinates: 27°10′N 87°25′E

Kosi Zone कोशी अञ्चल
- Former Zone
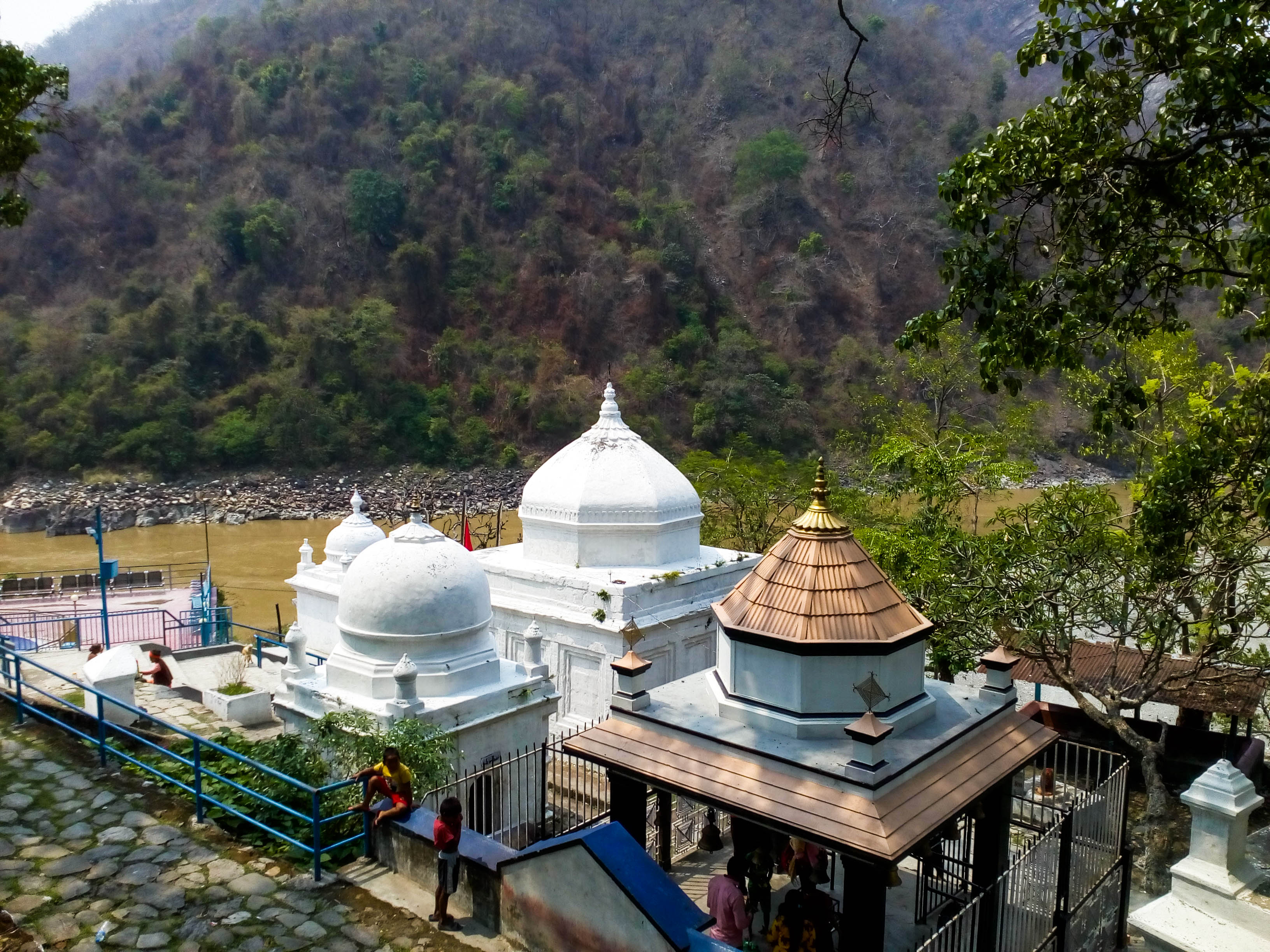
- Barahakshetra Temple

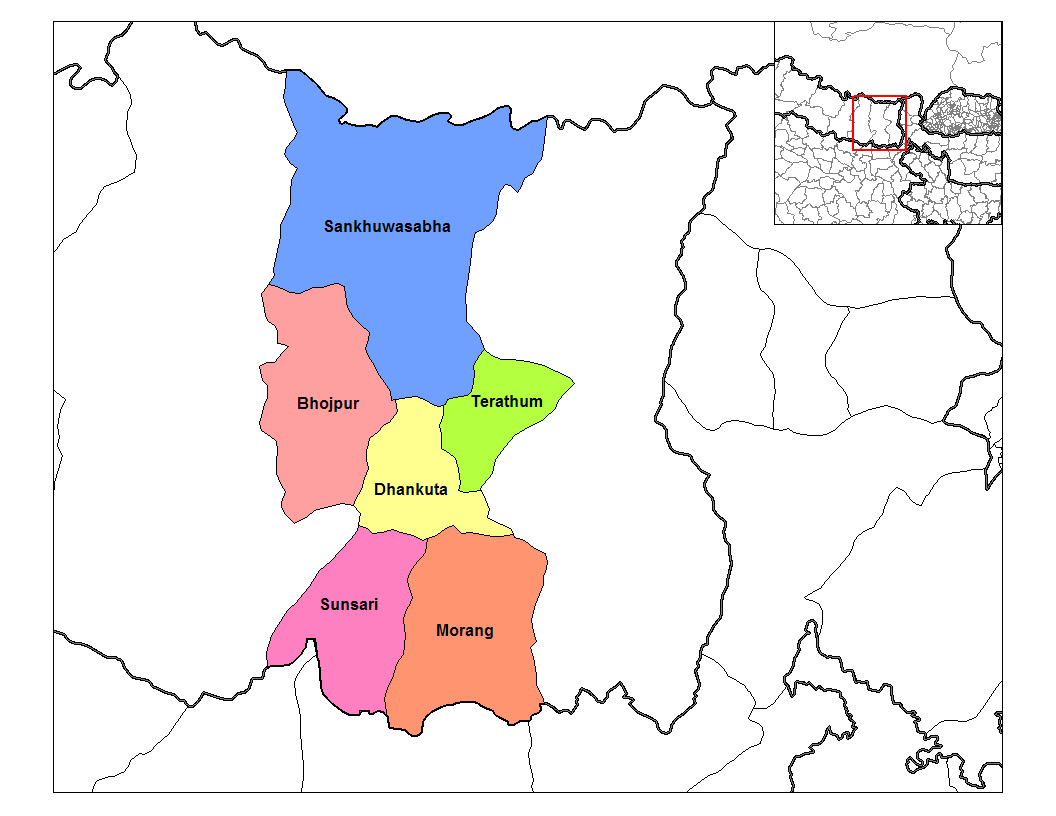
- Country: Nepal
- Named for: Koshi River
- Districts: List: Sunsari District; Morang District; Dhankuta District; Tehrathum District; Bhojpur District; Sankhuwasabha District

Area
  - Total: 9,669 km^{2} (3,733 sq mi)

Population (2011)
  - Total: 2,335,047
  - Density: 241.5/km^{2} (625.5/sq mi)
- Time zone: UTC+5:45 (Nepal Time)

Kosi or Koshi (Nepali: कोसी अञ्चल, Nepali: कोशी अञ्चल) was one of the fourteen zones of Nepal until the restructure of zones to provinces. The headquarters of Kosi Zone was Biratnagar which was also its largest city. Other cities of Kosi Zone were Inaruwa, Dharan, Dhankuta, Jhumka, Duhabi, Tarahara and Itahari. Its main rivers were Arun, Tamor and Sapta Koshi.

== Administrative subdivisions ==
Kosi was divided into six districts; since 2015 these districts have been redesignated as part of Province No. 1.

| District | Type | Headquarters | Since 2015 part of Province |
|---|---|---|---|
| Bhojpur | Hill | Bhojpur | Province No. 1 |
| Dhankuta | Hill | Dhankuta | Province No. 1 |
| Morang | Terai | Biratnagar | Province No. 1 |
| Sankhuwasabha | Mountain | Khandbari | Province No. 1 |
| Sunsari | Terai | Inaruwa | Province No. 1 |
| Terhathum | Hill | Myanglung | Province No. 1 |

== Famous and religious places ==
- Pindeswari Temple, Dharan
- Budha Subba Temple, Dharan
- Panchakanya Temple, Dharan
- Bishnupaduka Temple, Dharan
- Kali Mandir, Biratnagar
- Chintaangdevi Temple, Dhankuta
- Namaste Jharana, Vedetar
- Ramdhuni Mandir, Dhuni Ban
- Jhumkeshwar Mahadev, Jhumka
- Barahkshetra Mandir Barahachhetra
- Auliya Baba Mandir, Chatara
- Jabdi Mata Mandir, Pakali
- Betana Shimsar, Belbari
- Durgadevi Mandir, Laukahi

== See also ==
- Development Regions of Nepal (Former)
- List of zones of Nepal (Former)
- List of districts of Nepal
