= List of caves in Nepal =

This is a list of caves in Nepal.

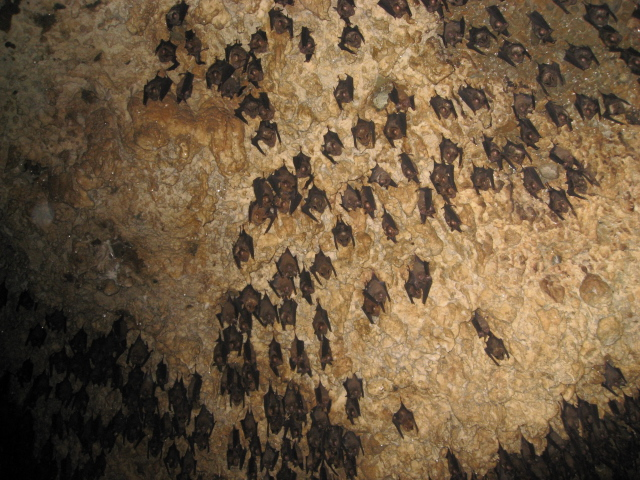
Chamere Cave

- Bat Cave (Chamero gufa)
- Chobhar Caves
- Gupteshwar Cave, Parbat
- Gupteshwor Mahadev cave, Pokhara
- Mahendra Cave
- Maratika Cave
- Mustang Caves
- Siddha Cave
- Biutchira Cave
