= Sikurima =

Kirat cultural figure

Cultural figure of Kirat Rai Community Sikurima
- सिकुरिमा
- Statue of Sikurima(right) and Raichhakule(left) at Paruhang Sapten Mangkhim,Sikkim
- Known for: pioneering for skills and development of cultural practices
- Spouse: Raichhakule
- Parent: Nagahong:(father)

Sikurima:Kirat Rai:सिकुरिमा(also spelled Sikrima, and known by different names in various Kirati Rai languages, including Nagelumma,Rinakha in some traditions) is a prominent female figure in Kirat Rai oral tradition. she is widely regarded as the wife of Raichhakule. according to several Kirat Rai ethno-cultural traditions, Sikurima is described as the daughter of Nagahong.

Sikurima is remembered as a primordial ancestral figure associated with the early development of Kirat Rai civilization. Together with Raichhakule, she is credited in oral tradition with contributing to the establishment of family life, social organization, cultural practices, and the transmission of traditional knowledge. Her role symbolizes the importance of women in the origins of Kirat Rai society and the continuity of ancestral heritage.
