= Raichhakule =

Kirat cultural figure

Cultural Hero of Kirat Rai Community Raichhakule
- रैछाकुले
- Statue of Raichakule at Tuwachung Jayajum
- Occupations: hunter, farmar
- Known for: pioneering figures associated with early agricultural cultivation, and the development of cultural practices
- Spouse: Sikurima
- Parent(s): Patesung:(father), Dilimdungma:(mother)
- Relatives: Tayama Khiyama

Raichhakule( Kirat Rai:रैछाकुले also known as Kokchilipa, Khākchilupā, or Hetchhakuppa) is a revered cultural hero in the oral traditions of the Kirat Rai people .closely associated with Tuwachung Jayajum and Halesi Caves in Khotang, Koshi Province of Nepal. He is remembered as an ancestral figure who helped preserve Mundum, strengthened Kirat Rai cultural identity, encouraged Traditional agriculture and settled living, and passed on rituals, customs, and Traditional knowledge. His legacy continues through oral traditions, festivals, and community memory, making him an enduring symbol of Kirat Rai heritage and civilization.

== Historical background ==
Information signboard of Raichhakule in Tuwachung Jayajum

According to Kirat Rai oral history, Raichhakule lived in the Halesi and Tuwachung areas in ancient times. Raichhakule played an important role in the development of traditional agriculture, cultivation,and settled village life. He is remembered as an ancestral teacher who encouraged farming, the sustainable use of natural resources, and the transmission of Indigenous Knowledge. He is also associated with preserving the Mundum, strengthening Kirat Rai cultural identity, and passing on rituals, customs, moral values, and social practices. Raichhakule is traditionally regarded as the younger brother of Tayama and Khiyama, who are revered for introducing spinning, weaving, and textile craftsmanship. Together, these three ancestral figures symbolize the origins of Kirat Rai civilization, representing the complementary development of agriculture, craftsmanship, and cultural traditions. Their stories continue to be celebrated through oral narratives, cultural festivals, and rituals, reflecting the enduring importance of ancestral heritage in Kirat Rai society.

== Different names of Raichhakule ==
Raichhakule and Tayama stone at Tuwachung Jayajum

Raichhakule is regarded in many Kirati Rai oral traditions as an important ancestral cultural figure shared across today's Rai linguistic groups. Although each community preserves its own language, they refer to this figure by different names, reflecting the rich linguistic diversity and common cultural heritage of the Kirati Rai people. Names of Raichhakule in Different Kirati Rai Linguistic GroupsTara Mani Rai (2025).

Different Names used Of Raichhakule in Kirati Rai Linguistic Group

| Linguistic Group | Name used |
|---|---|
| Chamling | Raichhākule,Khokchilikpä |
| Wambule | Khākchilupā |
| Yamphu | Kākchripā |
| Lohorung | Khākchripā |
| Sampang | Khākchilupā |
| Thulung | Khākchilik |
| Mewahang | Khākchulup |
| Khaling | Khākchālāb |
| Bantawa | Khokchilipa,Hetchhakuwā, Hechchhakupä |
| Dumi | Khokchilikpä, Khākchulippā |
| Jerung | Khākchilipā |
| Bayung | Koktisālā |
| Puma | Hetchhākupā |
