= Tuwachung Jayajum =

Historic sites in Koshi Province, Nepal

Coordinates: 27.2058°N 86.6559°E

Tuwachung Jayajum (Kirat Rai:तुवाचुङ जायजुम)is a historic and culturally significant site ancestral centers of early Kirati Rai people's culture, agriculture, and civilization.located at the summit of Malathumki Dada in Halesi Tuwachung Municipality, Khotang District, Koshi Province of Nepal.

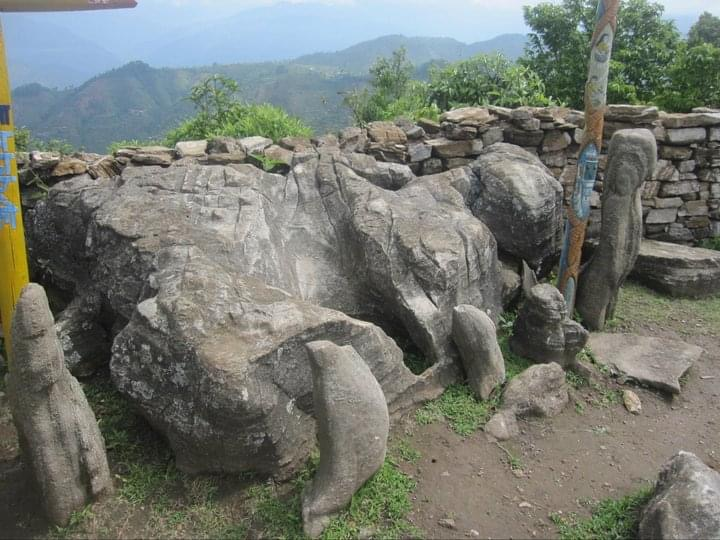
Taan Dhunga Tayama loom weaving stone in Tuwachung Jayajum pilgrimage site Halesi Tuwachung Municipality

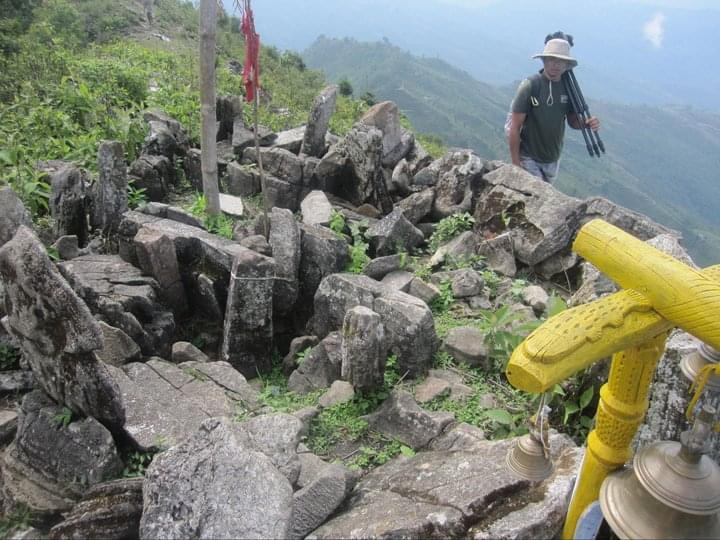
Khiyama dada (hill) in Tuwachung Jayajum pilgrimage site Halesi Tuwachung Municipality

According to the oral traditions of the Kirat Rai people, this is the sacred place where the Kirati sisters Tayama Khiyama first spun thread, wove cloth, and introduced the art of weaving. The sacred Tan Dhunga Loom weaving stone and (Raichhakule/Khokchilipa Shrine) at the site is believed to commemorate this ancient tradition.Tayama is elder sister Khiyama is younger sister with brother Kokchilipa(Raichhakule) live there in Halesi and Tuwachung area in ancient past.

The Kirat Rai community regards 'Tuwachung Jayajum' as an ancestral homeland and an important symbol of the origin of their civilization, culture, and traditional knowledge. The story of Tayama and Khiyama represents the beginning of weaving, craftsmanship and the cultural heritage of the Kirat people.

The nearby Halesi is one of Nepal's most important pilgrimage sites, revered by followers of Hinduism, the Kiratism and Buddhism. In recognition of the historical and cultural importance of both places, the local government was named Halesi Tuwachung Municipality.

== Preservation ==
Tuwachung hill after the development and preservation with the support of local body of Halesi Tuwachung Municipality

Sakela festival in Tuwachung Jayajum

The Tuwachung Jayajum Preservation and Protection Committee is a local heritage conservation committee formed with the support of the Halesi Tuwachung Municipality and local community representatives. The committee works to preserve and protect the cultural, historical, archaeological, religious, and natural heritage of Tuwachung Jayajum. Its responsibilities include conserving sacred sites, promoting Kirati Rai culture and traditions, organizing cultural festivals, encouraging heritage research, raising public awareness, and supporting sustainable tourism in collaboration with local stakeholders.

== Main attractions ==
View from Tuwachung Jayajum hill top

Its main attractions include the sacred sites of Tayama, Khiyama, and Raichakule/Kokchilipa, the historic weaving stones (Tan Dhunga), traditional worship places and the Tuwachung Mini Great Wall. From the hilltop, visitors enjoy panoramic views of the surrounding hills, forests, valleys, nearby villages and the Halesi region, especially during sunrise and sunset.
