= Tayama Khiyama =

Kirat cultural figure

Cultural Heroes of Kirat Rai Community Tayama Khiyama
- तायामा खियामा
- Statue of Tayama and Khiyama at Tuwachung Jayajum
- Occupations: farmars,loom weavers
- Known for: pioneers for weaving and textile
- Parent(s): Patesung:(father), Dilimdungma:(mother)
- Relatives: Raichhakule

Tayama Khiyama (Kirat Rai:तायामा खियामा) are revered as primordial ancestral figures and cultural ancestors of the Kirat Rai people. Tayama elder and Khiyama younger sister they are remembered as skilled weavers and are regarded as the pioneers of textile production, spinning, and traditional loom weaving. Their legacy symbolizes the origins of textile craftsmanship, women's knowledge, and early cultural development in Kirati Rai civilization. Traditions associated with Tuwachung Jayajum preserve their enduring place in Kirat Rai cultural history.

== Historical background ==
Information signboard of Tayama Khiyama at Tuwachung Jayajum

Tayama–Khiyama are among the most revered ancestral figures of Kirati Rai people they are regarded as primordial culture heroes who symbolize the origins of Kirati civilization and the development of essential Human skill . Although they are not recorded in contemporary historical documents, their stories have been preserved for generations through ritual recitations, oral narratives, songs, and cultural ceremonies. according to Rai traditions, Tayama and Khiyama pioneered weaving, spinning, and loom technology, laying the foundation of textile production and traditional craftsmanship. They are also associated with the beginnings of agriculture, settled village life, and the transmission of knowledge, skills, and social values to later generations. communities living in different places.

Rai people dancing Sakela at Tuwachung Jayajum

According to Kirat Rai The sacred landscape of Tuwachung Jayajum in Khotang is closely connected with their legends and is regarded as one of the most important cultural and spiritual sites of the Kirati Rai. Every year, devotees, scholars, and community members visit the area to honour their ancestral heritage. Tayama–Khiyama continue to represent creativity, innovation, self-reliance, and Cultural identity . Their enduring legacy reflects the deep relationship between the Kirati Rai people, their ancestral land, and the Mundum, which remains the foundation of their religious beliefs, cultural practices, and historical memory.

== Different names of Tayama Khiyama ==
Gossip stone of Tayama and Khiyama at Tuwachung Jayajum

Tayama and Khiyama are revered as primordial ancestral figures among today's Rai linguistic communities, known by different names reflecting linguistic diversity and shared cultural heritage. Different Names used Of Tayama-Khiyama in Kirati Rai Linguistic Group

Linguistic Group	Name used
Chamling	Tayāmā/Tāwāmā-Khiyāmā
Wambule	Jhaumo-Khliumo
Yamphu	
Lohorung	
Sampang	Tamā/Tonmā-Khiyāmā / Kʰemā
Thulung	Jaumā-Khliumā
Mewahang	
Khaling	Grom/Gromyā-Lās(Los)/Lāsyā
Bantawa	Təŋwāmā/Tangwāmā-Kʰiwāmā
Dumi	Tomā-Kʰemā
Jerung	Ja:umā-Khliumā
Bayung/Bahing	Jaumā-Khliumā
Puma	Tayāmā-Khijāmā
