= Kirat Rai (Unicode block) =

- Range: U+16D40..U+16D7F (64 code points)
- Plane: SMP
- Scripts: Kirat Rai
- Assigned: 58 code points
- Unused: 6 reserved code points

Unicode version history
- 16.0 (2024): 58 (+58)

Unicode documentation
- Code chart ∣ Web page

Kirat Rai is a Unicode block containing characters used to write the Bantawa language in the Indian state of Sikkim.

Kirat Rai^{[1]}^{[2]} Official Unicode Consortium code chart (PDF)
	0	1	2	3	4	5	6	7	8	9	A	B	C	D	E	F
U+16D4x	𖵀	𖵁	𖵂	𖵃	𖵄	𖵅	𖵆	𖵇	𖵈	𖵉	𖵊	𖵋	𖵌	𖵍	𖵎	𖵏
U+16D5x	𖵐	𖵑	𖵒	𖵓	𖵔	𖵕	𖵖	𖵗	𖵘	𖵙	𖵚	𖵛	𖵜	𖵝	𖵞	𖵟
U+16D6x	𖵠	𖵡	𖵢	𖵣	𖵤	𖵥	𖵦	𖵧	𖵨	𖵩	𖵪	𖵫	𖵬	𖵭	𖵮	𖵯
U+16D7x	𖵰	𖵱	𖵲	𖵳	𖵴	𖵵	𖵶	𖵷	𖵸	𖵹						
Notes: 1. As of Unicode version 16.0; 2. Grey areas indicate non-assigned code points

== History ==
The following Unicode-related documents record the purpose and process of defining specific characters in the Kirat Rai block:

Version	Final code points (Note: Proposed code points and characters names may differ from final code points and names)	Count	L2 ID	WG2 ID	Document
16.0	U+16D40..16D79	58	L2/11-105	N4018	Pandey, Anshuman (2011-04-13), Introducing the Khambu Rai Script
16.0	U+16D40..16D79	58	L2/11-145	N4037	Pandey, Anshuman (2011-05-02), Introducing the Kirat Rai Script
16.0	U+16D40..16D79	58	L2/21-132		Evans, Lorna (2021-07-16), Preliminary document towards advancing the Kirat Rai script
16.0	U+16D40..16D79	58	L2/21-130		Anderson, Deborah; Whistler, Ken; Pournader, Roozbeh; Liang, Hai (2021-07-26), "11 "Kirat Rai"", Recommendations to UTC #168 July 2021 on Script Proposals
16.0	U+16D40..16D79	58	L2/21-123		Cummings, Craig (2021-08-03), "Action 168-A98", Draft Minutes of UTC Meeting 168, "Confirm changes are made to the Roadmap (remove "Khambu Rai" ...)"
16.0	U+16D40..16D79	58	L2/22-068		Anderson, Deborah; Whistler, Ken; Pournader, Roozbeh; Constable, Peter (2022-04-15), "6 Kirat Rai", Recommendations to UTC #171 April 2022 on Script Proposals
16.0	U+16D40..16D79	58	L2/22-043R		Mandal, Biswajit; Evans, Lorna (2022-04-20), Proposal to Encode Kirat Rai script in the Universal Character Set
16.0	U+16D40..16D79	58	L2/22-061		Constable, Peter (2022-07-27), "Consensus 171-C13", Approved Minutes of UTC Meeting 171, "Accept 58 Kirat Rai characters"
16.0	U+16D40..16D79	58	L2/24-013R		Anderson, Deborah; Goregaokar, Manish; Kučera, Jan; Whistler, Ken; Pournader, Roozbeh; Constable, Peter (2024-01-22), "5. Kirat Rai and Tulu-Tigalari", Recommendations to UTC #178 January 2024 on Script Proposals
16.0	U+16D40..16D79	58	L2/24-006		Constable, Peter (2024-01-31), "Section 5 and Section 5.1", UTC #178 Minutes
