= Paruhang Sapten Mangkhim =

Coordinates: 27°20′03″N 88°35′22″E

Paruhang Sapten Mangkhim is a temple located at Rai Gaon, Ranka, Gangtok, East Sikkim, India, approximately 13 km from Gangtok city. It is the largest Kirat Rai mangkhim in Sikkim and an important religious, cultural, and educational centre. The complex preserves Kirat Rai religion, Mundum traditions, languages, history, and heritage, and houses the International Kirat Rai Linguistic and Cultural Research Centre with a library and research facilities.
