= Siddha Cave =

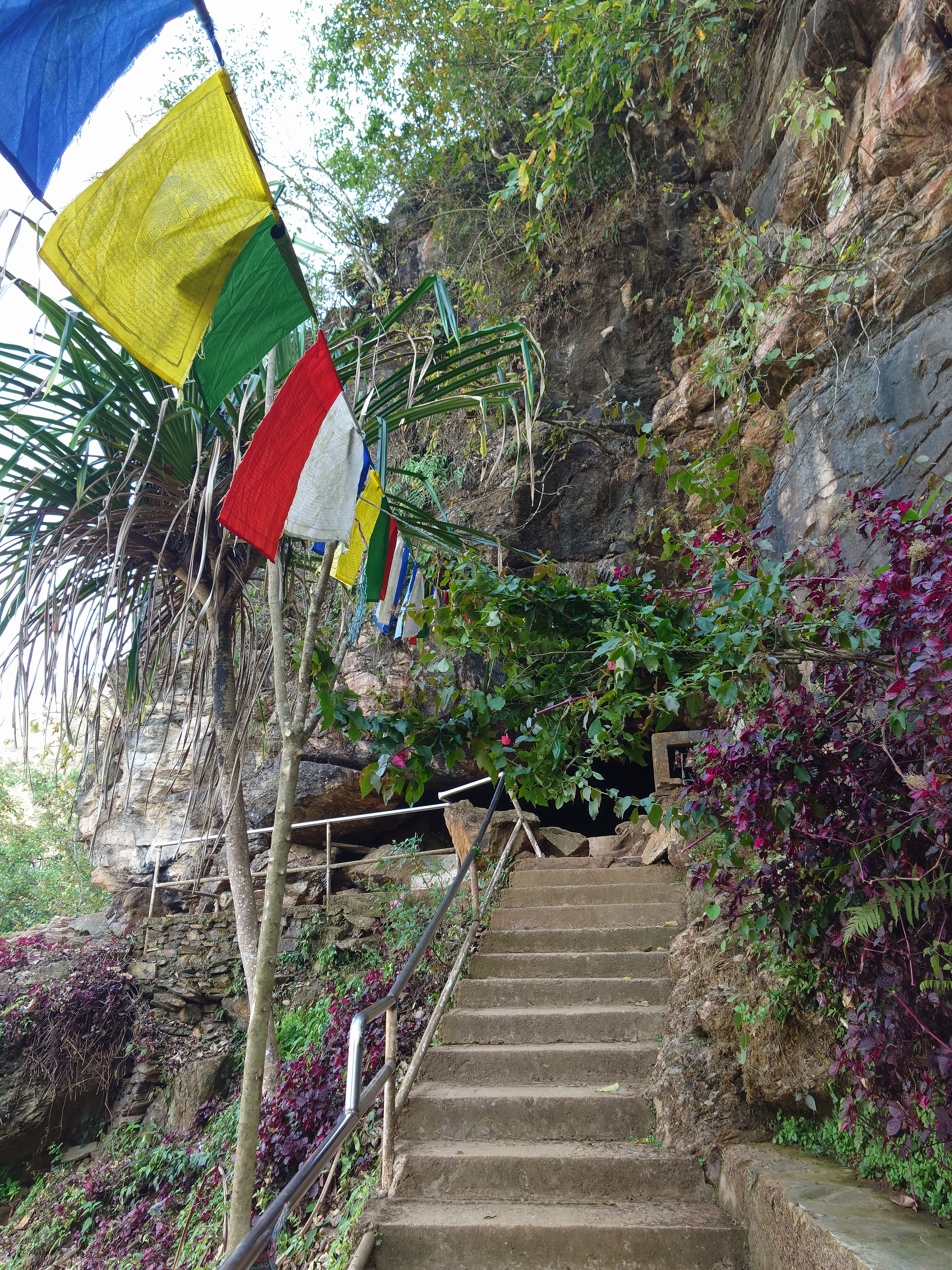
Entrance of Siddha Cave

Siddha Cave or Siddha Gufa is a cave located in Bimalnagar, Tanahun District, Nepal. It has an inner area of around 0.5 kilometers and can accommodate around 2,500 people. It stands 50 meters high and extends 437 meters deep.

== See also ==
- List of caves in Nepal
