= Bat Cave, Nepal =

Cave system in Pokhara, Nepal

Bat Cave
- Chameri Gupha
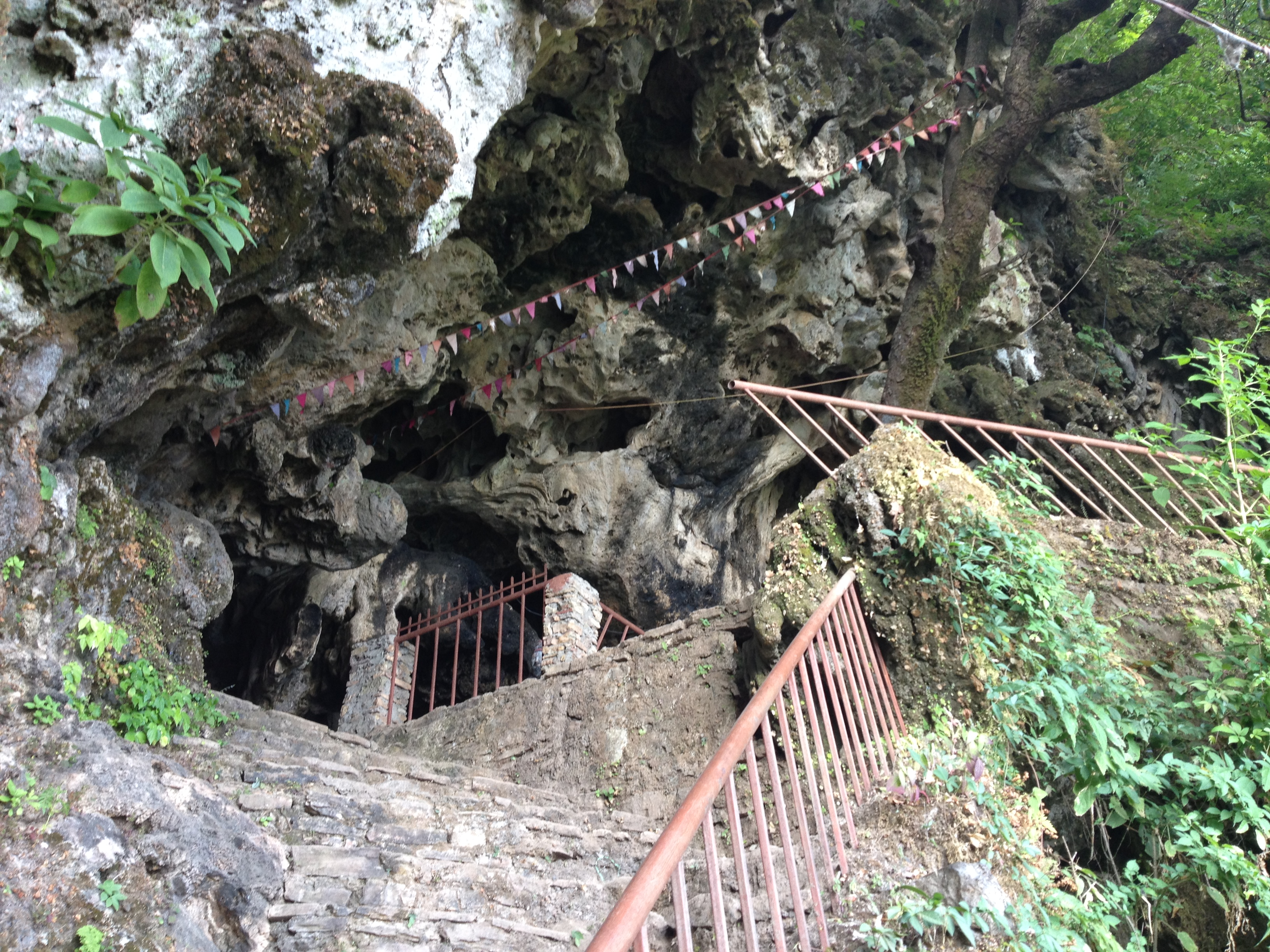
- Entrance of Bat Cave

- Location within Nepal
- Location: Pokhara, Nepal
- Coordinates: 28°16′03″N 83°58′33″E
- Length: 150 m (490 ft)
- Height variation: 15m
- Elevation: 990m
- Discovery: 1983
- Geology: limestone
- Entrances: 1
- Access: Tours are available in season

The Bat Cave (Chameri Gufa in Nepali language) is a solutional cave in the Kaski District in Pokhara, Nepal. It is known for a habitat of Horseshoe bats inside the cave, over the walls and ceiling. The cave is formed of limestone. It is a show cave and one of the most popular tourist destinations in Pokhara.

== Geography ==
The cave has one entrance and one exit. The exit is narrower than the entrance and needs climbing. The indigenous belief is that only those who have not sinned should pass the exit hole. The cave is surrounded by forest. It is close to the nearby Mahendra Cave. The cave is U-shaped and inside the cave are carvings of Hindu deities. Up to 18 species of bats appear in the cave during the winter months.

== Gallery ==
Bats on ceiling
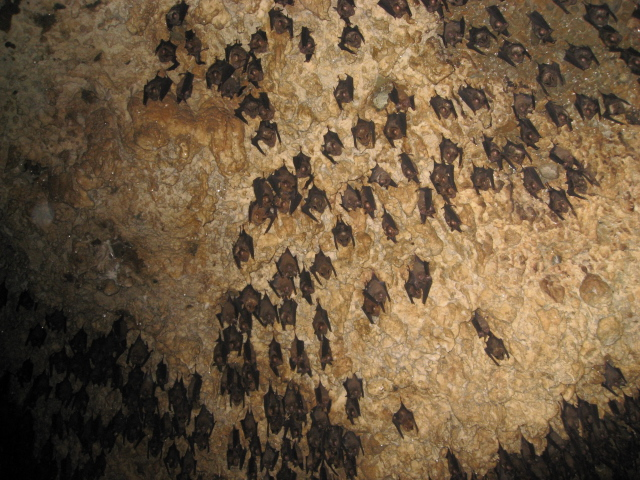

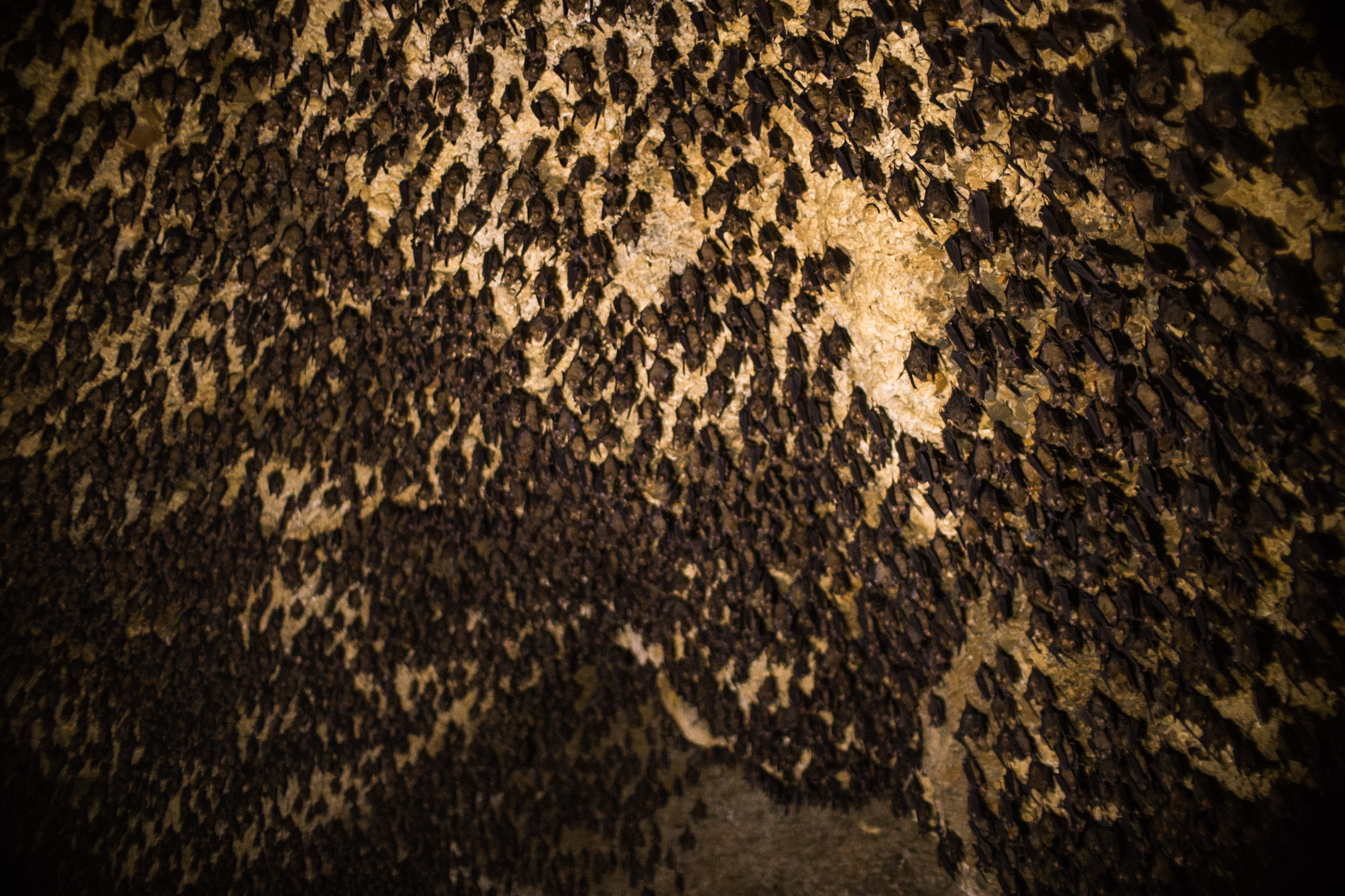

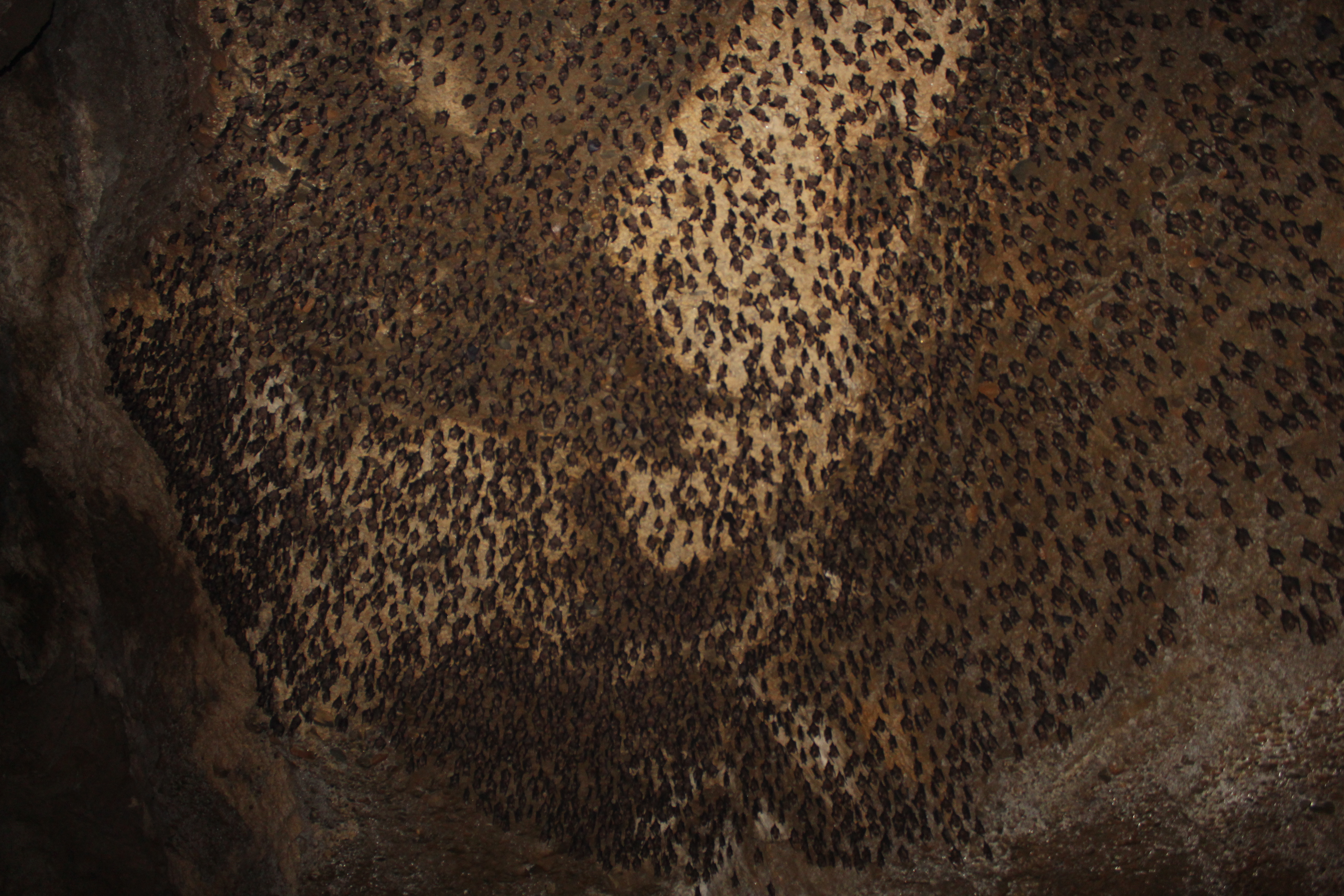

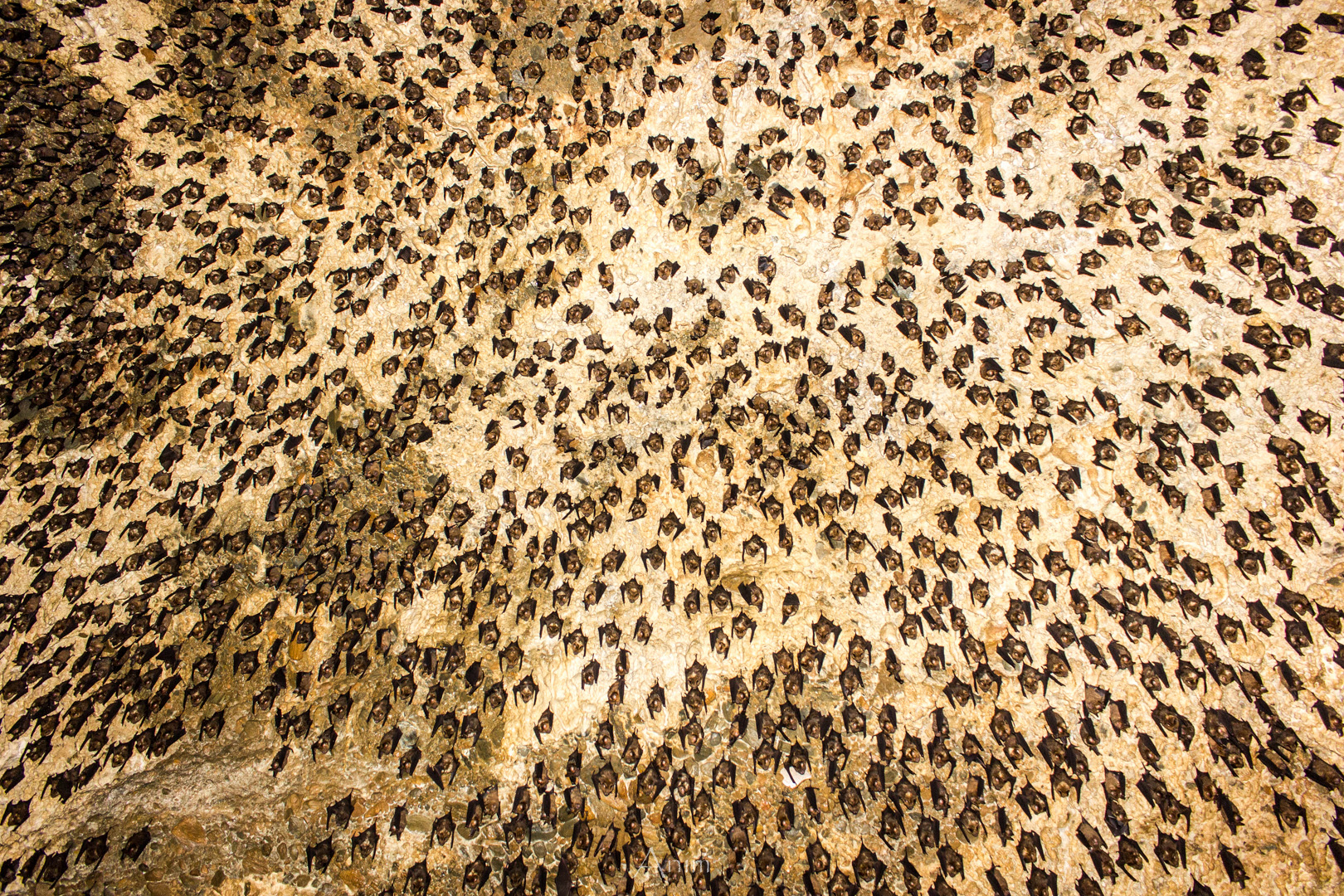

== See also ==
- Mahendra Cave, nearby cave
- List of caves in Nepal
