= Mahadevasthan =

Former Village Development Committee in Nepal

Mahadevasthan महादेवस्थान
- Village Development Committee
- Nicknames: Halesi, Maratika
- Country: Nepal
- Zone: Sagarmatha Zone
- District: Khotang District

Population (1991)
  - Total: 2,343
- Time zone: UTC+5:45 (Nepal Time)

Mahadevasthan is a village and Village Development Committee in Khotang District in the Sagarmatha Zone of eastern Nepal. At the 1991 Nepal census, it had a population of 2,343 persons living in 453 individual households.

Mahadevasthan is the location of the Halesi-Maratika caves, a popular pilgrimage destination for both Hindus and Himalayan Buddhists.
