= Halesi Tuwachung Municipality =

Halesi Tuwachung हलेसी तुवाचुड़
- Municipality
- Location in Province No. 1 Halesi Tuwachung (Nepal)
- Coordinates: 27.17°N 86.59°E
- Country: Nepal
- Province: Province No. 1
- Districts: Khotang
- Total Wards: 11
- Headquarter: Durchim

Government
  - Mayor: Iban Rai (NC)
  - Deputy Mayor: Bimla Rai (NC)

Area
  - Total: 280.17 km^{2} (108.17 sq mi)
  - Rank: 6th (Province No. 1)

Population (2011)
  - Total: 29,532
  - Density: 105.41/km^{2} (273.00/sq mi)
- Time zone: UTC+5:45 (NST)
- Website: official website

Halesi Tuwachung (Nepali: हलेसी तुवाचुङ) is a municipality out of two municipalities in Khotang District of Province No. 1 of Nepal. It is in western part of the district and about 40 km far from Diktel, the headquarter of the district. It is named after the famous Halesi Mahadev. and Tuwachung Jayajum historical site.

The municipality is divided into 11 wards and total area of the municipality is 280.17 km^{2}. According to 2011 census of Nepal, the municipality's population is 29,532 peoples.
