= Bichitra Cave =

Cave in Nepal

- Dhurkot Cave
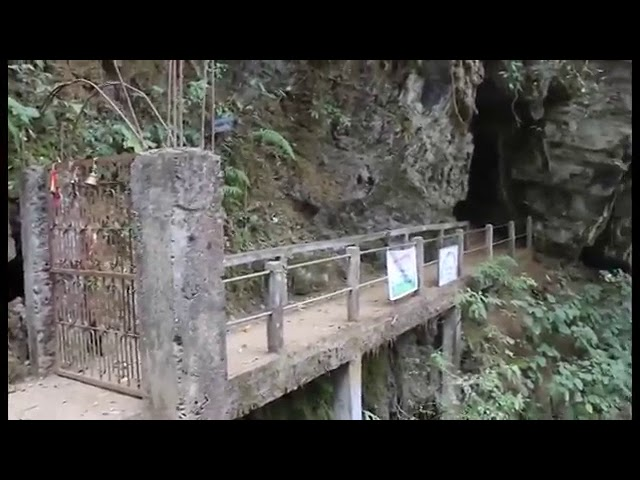
- Entrance of Bichitra Cave
- Interactive map of Bichitra Cave
- Location: Dhurkot Rural Municipality, Gulmi District, Nepal
- Coordinates: 28.1223°N 83.1630°E
- Length: 185 meters
- Discovery: 1988 (Janardan Bhandari)

Bichitra Cave, also known as Dhurkot Cave, is located in Dhurkot, Nepal. It was discovered in 1988.

== Geological features ==
The geographical definition of this cave extends approximately 185 meters in length, featuring a primary entrance along with several natural openings.

== Tourism and development ==
Efforts to develop Bichitra Cave as a tourist destination have received substantial support from local, provincial, and federal governments, with investments exceeding Rs. 20 million. Local religious leaders, including Guru Ramchandra Das of the Arvindra Ashram, have studied and promoted the cave's cultural heritage.

== See also ==
- Gulmi District
