= Mankhim =

Kirat temple in Sikkim, India

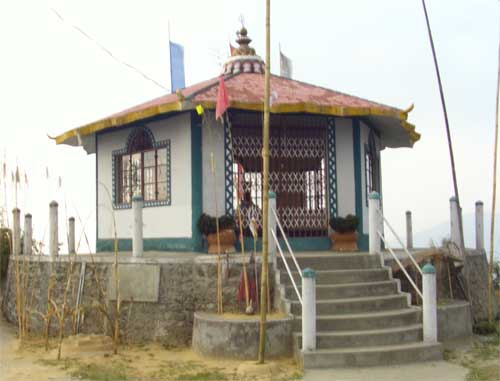
Mankhim

Mankhim or Mangkhim is the temple of the Kirat (Rai), one of the ethnolinguistic groups of Nepal and the Indian state of Sikkim, located at Aritar, Sikkim, India. The Rai community assembles twice every year at the temple for the celebration of Sakewa, a day fixed for worship (usually falling in the months of April or May). In the Rai language mang means deity and khim means house.
