= Mahendra Cave =

Cave in Batulechaur, Kaski, Nepal

- Mahendra Gupha
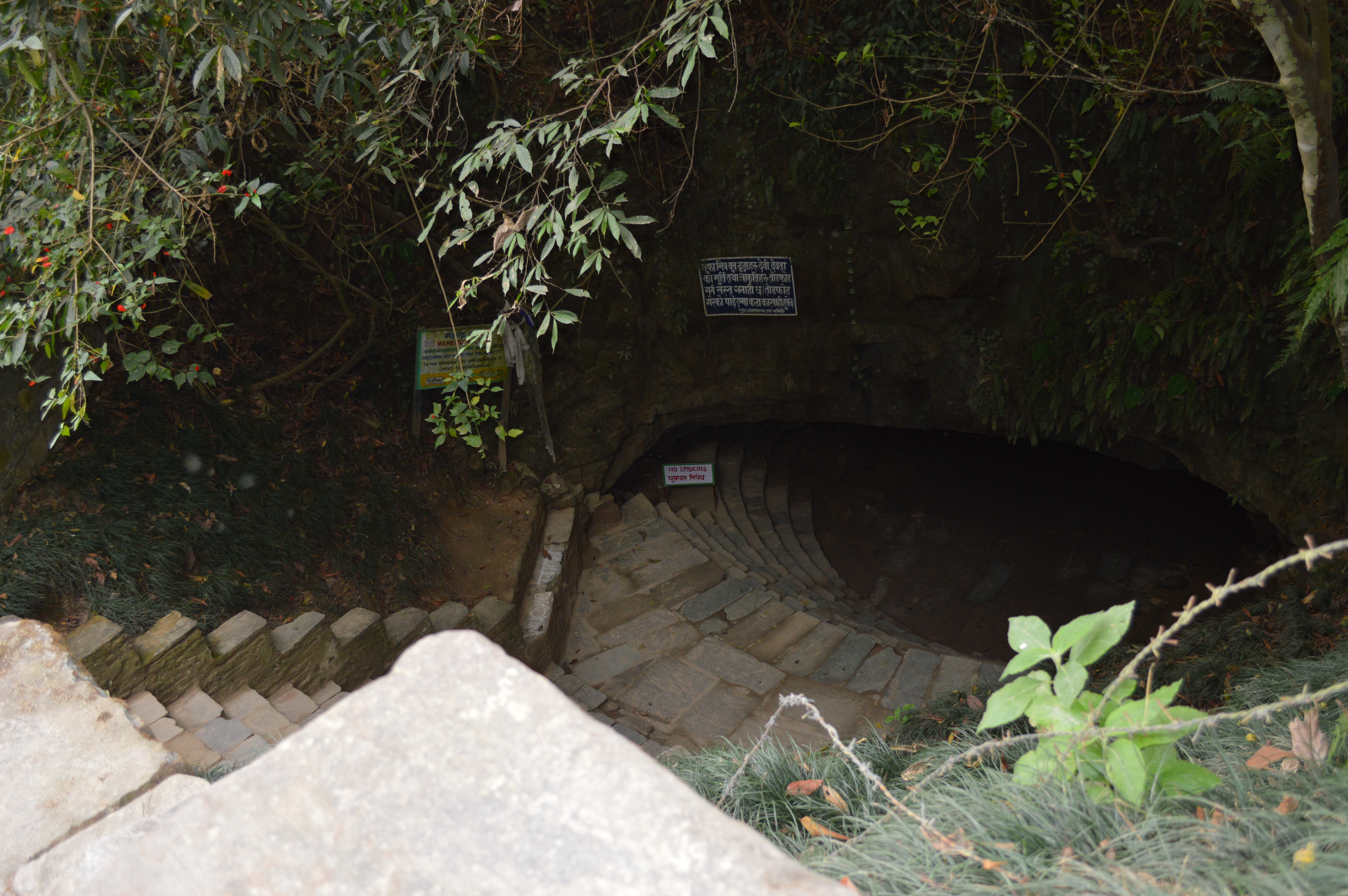
- Entrance of Mahendra Cave

- Location within Nepal
- Location: Pokhara, Nepal
- Coordinates: 28°16′17″N 83°58′47″E
- Length: 200 m (660 ft)
- Geology: Pleistocene limestone
- Entrances: 1
- Access: Tours are available in season
- Website: www.mahendracave.com

Mahendra Gupha is a cave located in Pokhara-16, Batulechaur, Kaski district, close to the Kali khola, is a large limestone cave. It is a rare example of a cave system in Nepal containing stalagmites and stalactites. This show cave attracts thousands of tourists every year. A statue of Hindu lord Shiva can be found inside the cave.

== History ==
This cave was discovered in the 1950s by shepherds in Pokhara. The old name of the cave was 'Adhero Bhawan' which literally means Dark Habitat. The cave got its name from the Late King Mahendra Bir Bikram Shah Dev, then ruler of the country, who visited the place after he read about it in the Newari language newspaper. The cave was named Mahendra after it was officially inaugurated by the then King Mahendra. The cave got rapid attraction after the royal visit and since then it has remained one of the most visited places in Pokhara. It was first properly surveyed in 1976 by a small team of speleologists from the UK including Jane Wilson-Howarth who documented the animals that lived in the dark zone of the cave. Copies of the expedition report are lodged with the UK copyright libraries and at the UK Royal Geographical Society.

== Location ==
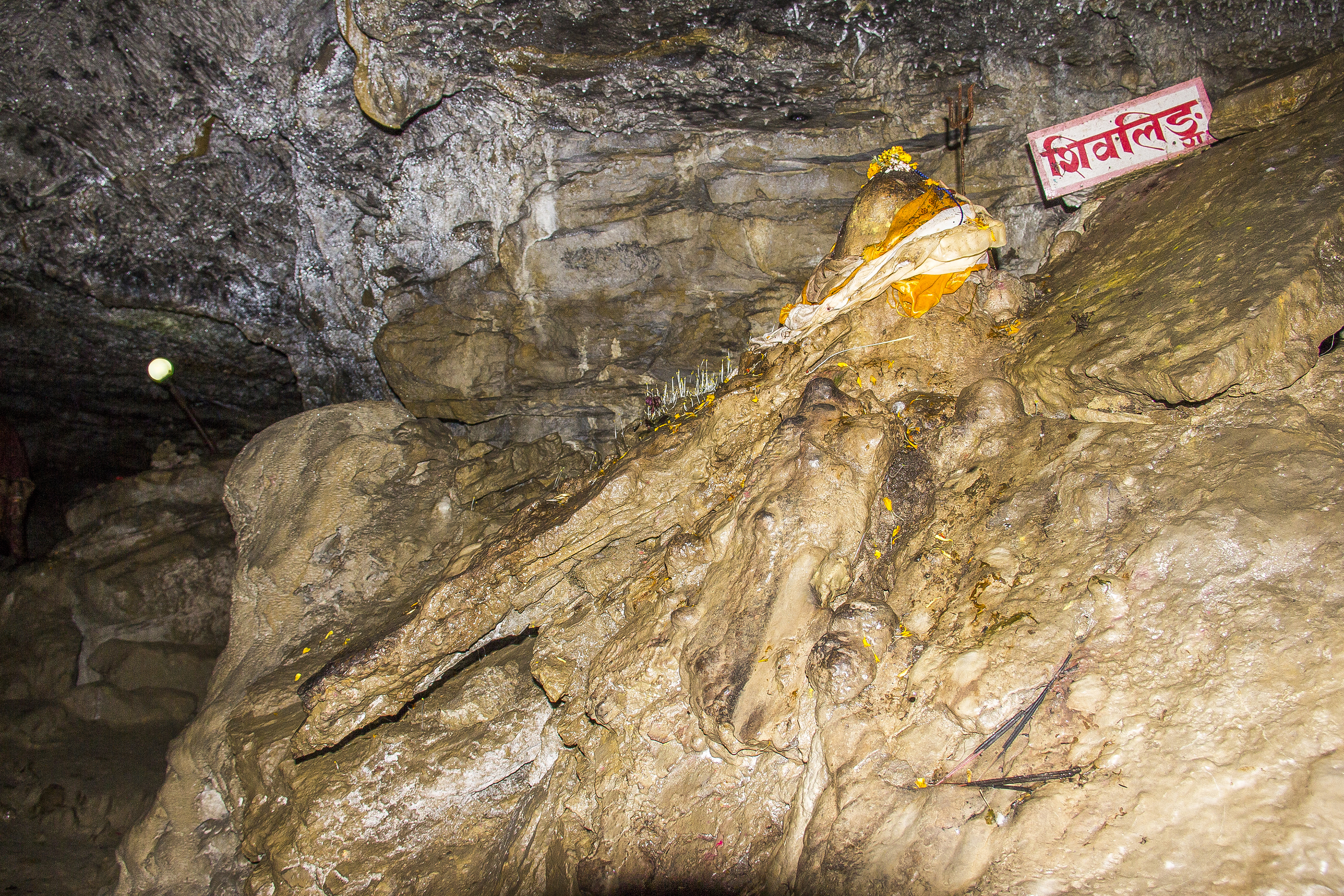
shiv linga inside Mahendra cave

Mahendra Cave is located in the city of Pokhara in the western region of Nepal. It is about 1100 meters above sea level. It has formed in soft, young (Pleistocene) limestone which is overlaid by conglomerates. The cave can be accessed by visitors from the Pokhara Airport within thirty minutes by taxi, one hour by public buses and two hours by foot. From the Prithvi Bus Park, it is ten minutes shorter than from the airport via public vehicles.

== Adventure ==
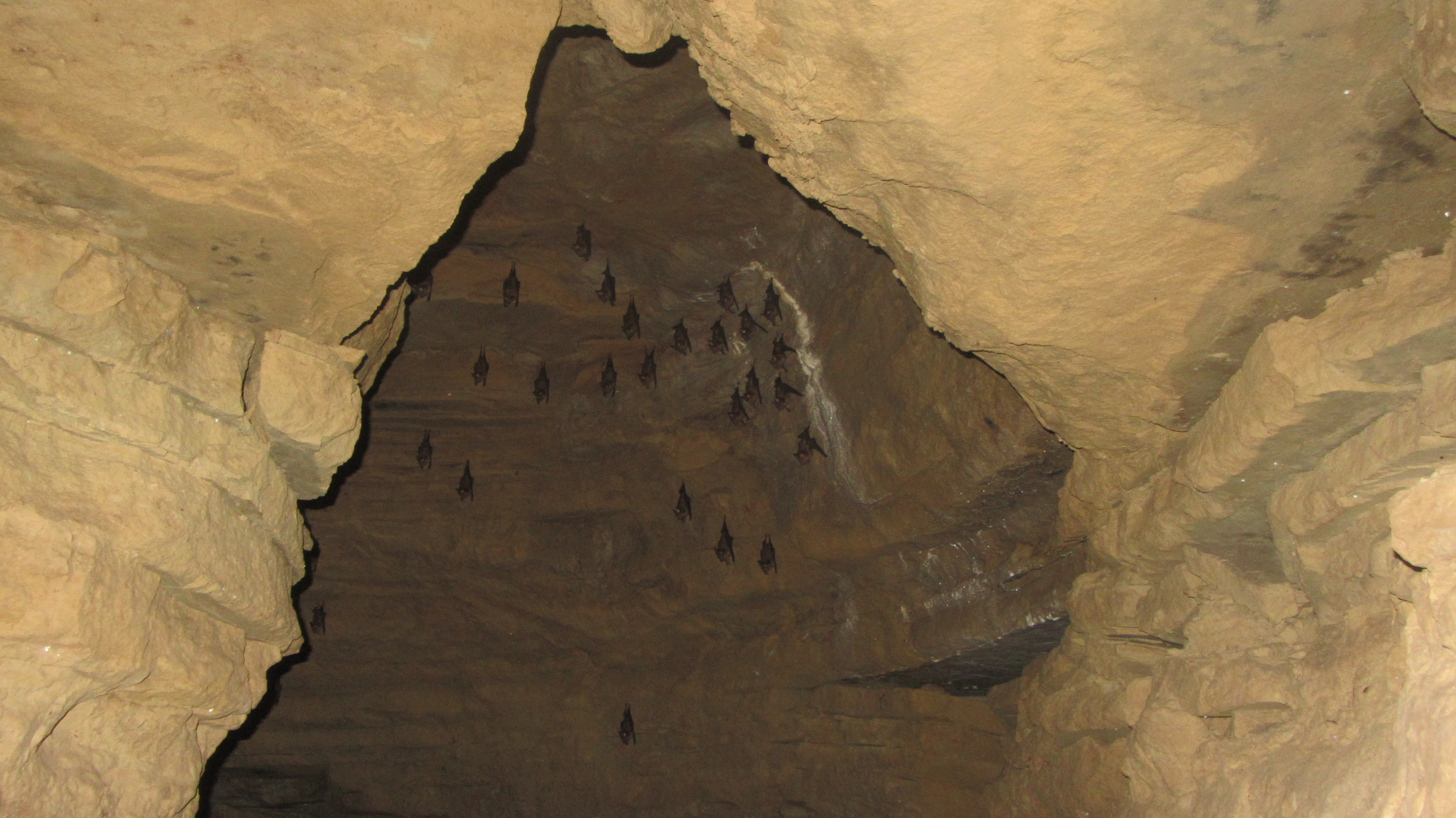
Bats roosting in Mahendra Cave

The cave corridors are completely dark with continuously dripping water overhead. The cave is formed of limestone, which falls to the ground and continuously forms electrical sparks. Due to the darkness, artificial lighting is provided inside approximately half of the accessible cave. The cave consists of about 100m of easily accessible passages and a further 100m of low unstable corridors entered by way of a collapsed passage only perhaps half a meter high. A survey of the entire cave and lists of the bats and invertebrates living inside are found in the report of the 1976 British Speleological Expedition to the region. There is a Free WIFI in the location for the purpose of promoting the place and knowing the significance of the cave.

== Wildlife ==
The cave is home to four species of bats Hipposideros armiger, Hipposideros bicolor, Rhinolophus macrotis and Megaderma lyra as well as a range of insects and even occasionally freshwater crabs, Potamon atkinsoniamum. At least nine collembolan species have been recorded from this cave and it is the type locality for the blind 1.6mm long Troglopedetes nepalensis and the six-eyed 2.6mm long Troglopedetes churchillatus.

== Sightseeing near Mahendra Cave ==
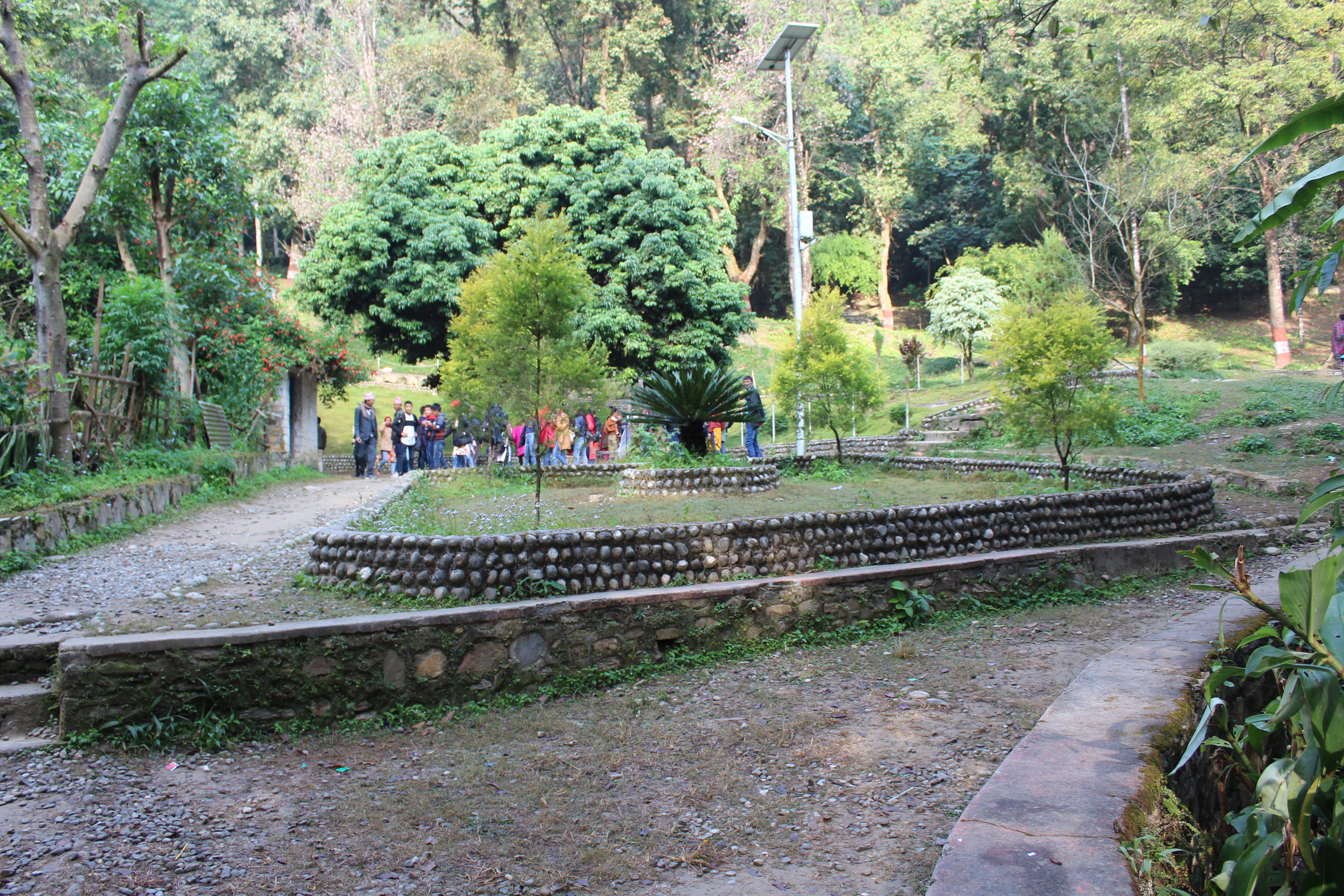
Garden at Mahendra Cave

The place where Mahendra cave lies is full of greenery. The grazing horses and mules can frequently be observed in this area. This place lies at the bottom of a hill covered with greenery. Many surrounding hills full of greenery can be observed from here. In the immediate vicinity are two other caves, the Kumari Cave and the Bat Cave. Bat Cave can also be visited by travelling on the trail path just beneath the hills within ten minutes by foot.

== See also ==
- Bat cave
- Pokhara
