= Halesi-Maratika Caves =

Cave and temple in Nepal

Halesi-Maraktika Caves
- Haleshi Mahadevstan
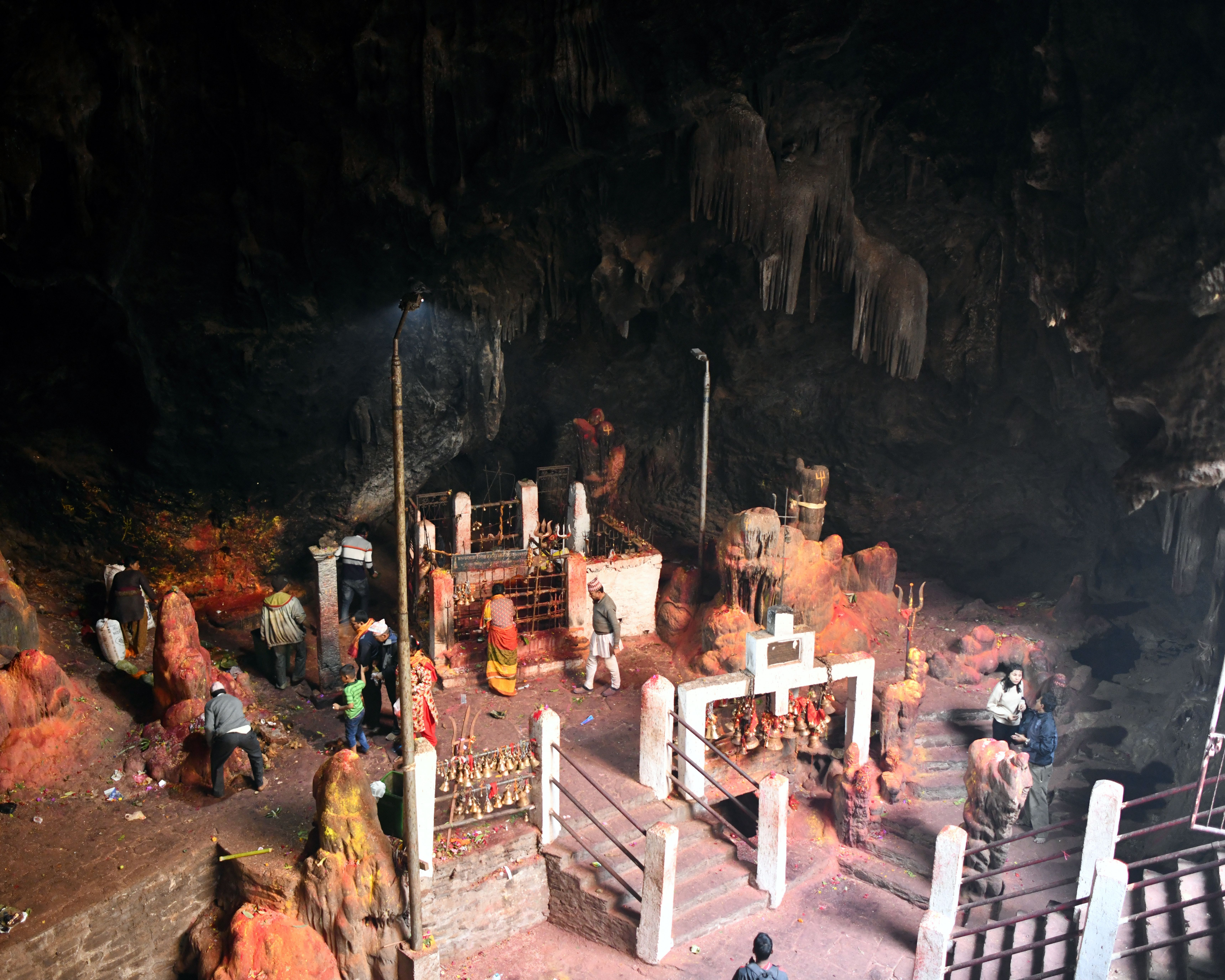
- The main Halesi-Maratika Cave (Halesi Mahadev Temple)

- Halesi-Maraktika caves in Nepal

Religion
- Affiliation: Hinduism, Buddhism, Kiratism
- District: Khotang
- Province: Province No. 1
- Deity: Mahadev

Location
- Location: Halesi Tuwachung Municipality
- Country: Nepal
- Coordinates: 27.19006°N 86.622391°E

Architecture
- Type: Naturally formed

The Halesi-Maratika Caves (also the Haleshi Mahadev temple) are located next to the village of Mahadevasthan, in the Khotang District of eastern Nepal, 3,100 ft. – 4,734 ft. above sea level. The cave and temple are about 185 km south west of Mount Everest. The temple is a venerated pilgrimage site for Hindus, Buddhists and Kirat. The caves are called the Halesi Mahadev Temple by Hindus who associate them with Mahadeva, a form of Shiva; while they are known as the sacred place to Buddhists, who consider them to be the caves associated with the legend of Padmasambhava. The Kirati Rai of the region worship Halesi as an ancestral deity of the community. The Kirat mundhum, a rich oral tradition of the Kirats, manifests that their ancestor Raechhakule (Khokchilipa) also known as Hetchhakuppa used to stay inside the Halesi cave in the remote past. For that reason, the Kirat/Rais consider Halesi as their ancestral place.

== Geology and environment ==
This cave is 67 feet below the surface. It is a tourist destination. Its entrance is shaped as a half moon and faces towards the east. It has a round shape, with a diameter of 193 feet, with another, separate, cave lying beneath. The floor is 223 feet in circumference. The location of this cave lies between the holy rivers Dudh Koshi and Sun Kosi. This place is usually cold and rainy. Nowadays it is accessible by motorcycles and jeeps.

== History ==
The caves of Halesi-Maratika are referred to in Himalayan literature as far back as the 12th century. Kathang Zanglingma, a biography of Padmasambhava, a terma revealed and transmitted by Nyangrel Nyima Ozer, describes the original events which made the Maratika caves a sacred place for Vajrayana practitioners.

== Religious significance ==
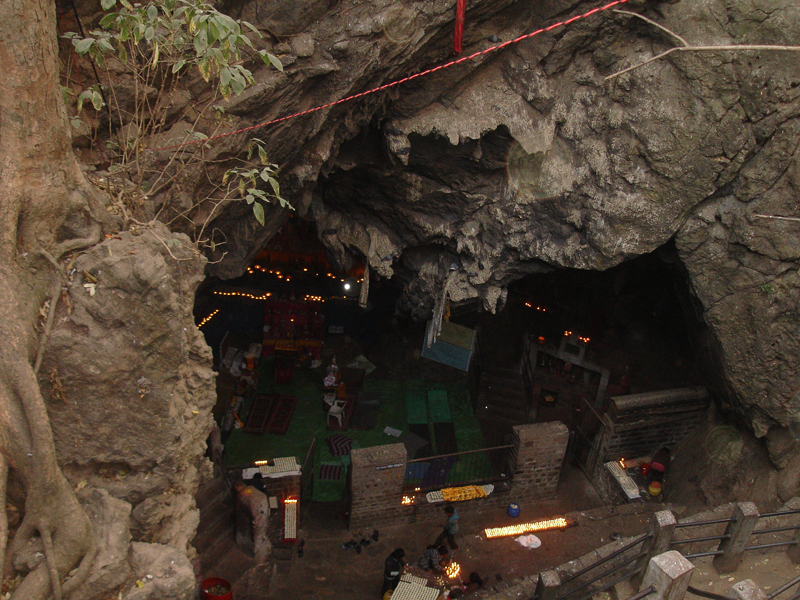
Haleshi Mahadevsthaan

The most famous natural cave in Khotang District is said to have been the abode of Mahadeva while hiding away from the monster Bhasmasur. It is an important pilgrimage center located in east Nepal for both Hindus and Buddhist. The cave is nicknamed 'the Pashupatinath of the east'. Well-attended religious fairs are observed here on Shivaratri and Bala Chaturdashi.

=== In Buddhism ===
Mandarava and Padmasambhava realized a number of terma that had been elementally encoded in the cave by dakini Sangwa Yeshe. These terma numbers among the longevity teachings of Buddha Amitabha, and were given at the behest of Bodhisattva Avalokiteswara. It is here, at the cave, that Mandarava and Padmasambhava attained the Vidyadhara of longevity (or long life).

=== In Hinduism ===
Hindus from India come to visit here after climbing many hills. Many people come here from places like Ladania and Jayanagar during the month of Shrawan to pray to Haleshi Mahadev. It is believed that Lord Shiva hid from the demon Bhasmasur for 6,000 years in this cave.

During the holidays of Bhasmasur, Rama Navami, and Ganesh Chaturthi, fairs and festivities are held in the area.
