= Kirat Rai =

Abugida script

Kirat Rai 𖵄𖵤𖵝𖵒𖵝𖵨 Khambu Rai Rai Barṇamālā Kirat Khambu Rai
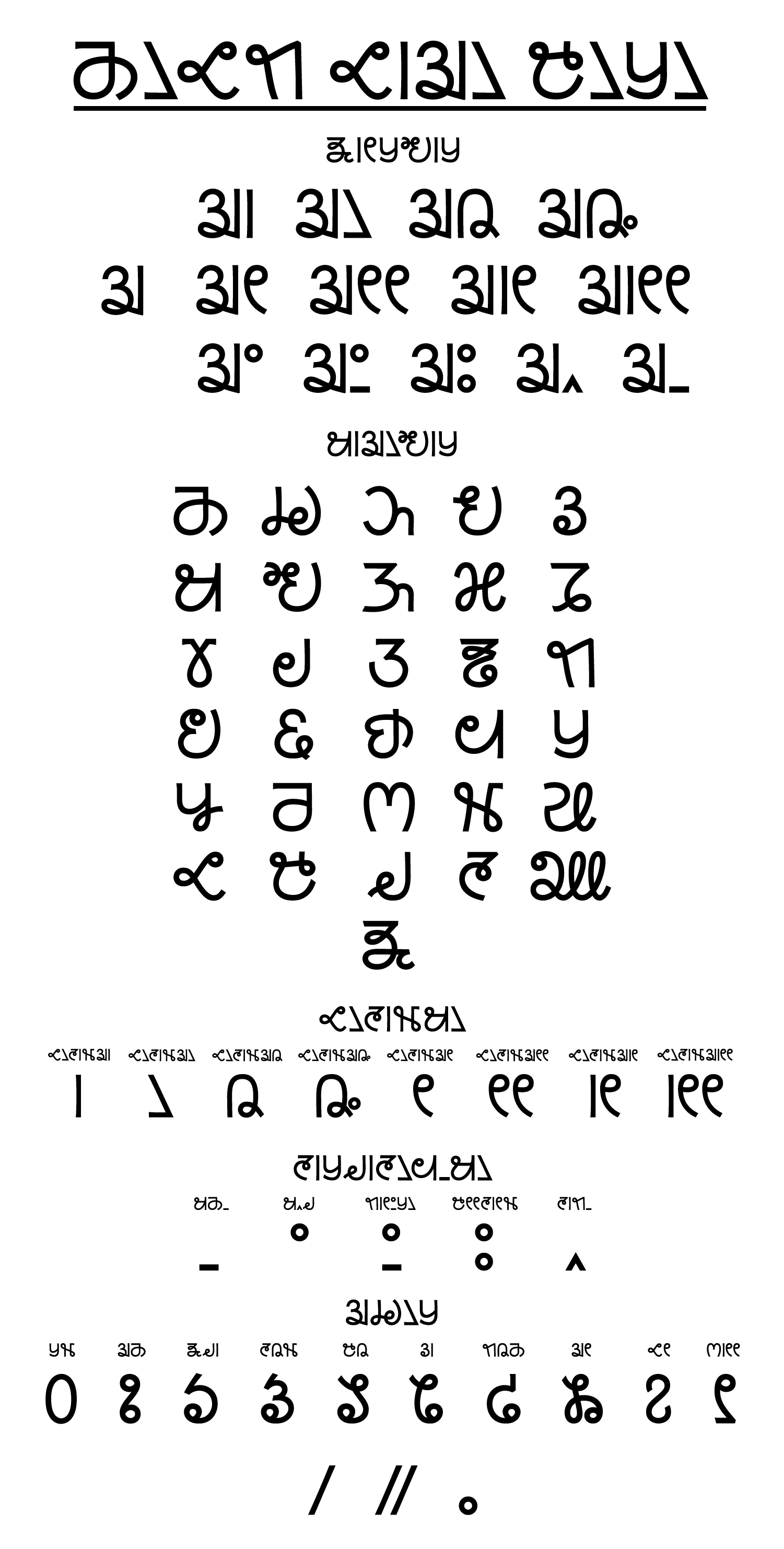
- Kirat Rai Varnamala (alphabet Chart)
- Script type: Abugida
- Period: 1920 – present
- Direction: Left-to-right
- Languages: Bantawa

ISO 15924
- ISO 15924: Krai (396), Kirat Rai

Unicode
- Unicode alias: Kirat Rai
- Unicode range: U+16D40–U+16D7F

Kirat Rai (also called Khambu Rai, Rai Barṇamālā and Kirat Khambu Rai) is a left-to-right abugida (a type of segmental writing system), based on the Sumhung Lipi of 1920s, used to write the Bantawa language in the Indian state of Sikkim. Kirat Rai is composed of 31 primary characters, including seven vowels (and seven related vowel diacritics), one of which (/a/) is inherent in all consonants, 31 consonants, a virama to cancel the inherent vowel, and a vowel carrier to be used in combination with the vowel diacritics for writing word-initial vowels.

== History ==
Khambu Rai is part of the Brahmic family of scripts from India, Nepal, Tibet and Southeast Asia. Smriti Rai mentions that the Khambu Rai people, speakers of the Bantawa language used to write with the Khambu Rai script developed by Late Kripasalyan Rai in 1981-1982 from the Devanagari script. The Khambu-Rai language (Bantawa language) is taught in schools up to the primary level ever since the Khambu-Rai language was recognized as one of the official languages of Sikkim in 1997. The origin of the Kirat Rai script goes as far back as the 1920s, when the Sumhung Lipi script was created by Tika Ram Rai for writing a religious book called Sumhung. In 1981-82 Kripasalyan Rai of Gyalshing district reintroduced and promoted Sumhung Lipi script as "Kripasalyan Lipi" through his book Rāī Akṣarko Barṇamālā.

== Unicode ==
Kirat Rai was added to the Unicode Standard in September, 2024 with the release of version 16.0. As of that date, there was a single Unicode font, put out by SIL.

The Unicode block for Kirat Rai is U+16D40–U+16D7F:

Kirat Rai^{[1]}^{[2]} Official Unicode Consortium code chart (PDF)
	0	1	2	3	4	5	6	7	8	9	A	B	C	D	E	F
U+16D4x	𖵀	𖵁	𖵂	𖵃	𖵄	𖵅	𖵆	𖵇	𖵈	𖵉	𖵊	𖵋	𖵌	𖵍	𖵎	𖵏
U+16D5x	𖵐	𖵑	𖵒	𖵓	𖵔	𖵕	𖵖	𖵗	𖵘	𖵙	𖵚	𖵛	𖵜	𖵝	𖵞	𖵟
U+16D6x	𖵠	𖵡	𖵢	𖵣	𖵤	𖵥	𖵦	𖵧	𖵨	𖵩	𖵪	𖵫	𖵬	𖵭	𖵮	𖵯
U+16D7x	𖵰	𖵱	𖵲	𖵳	𖵴	𖵵	𖵶	𖵷	𖵸	𖵹						
Notes 1.As of Unicode version 18.0 2.Grey areas indicate non-assigned code points
