= Eastern Development Region, Nepal =

Coordinates: 26°59′N 87°20′E

Eastern Development Region पूर्वाञ्चल विकास क्षेत्र
- Former Development Region
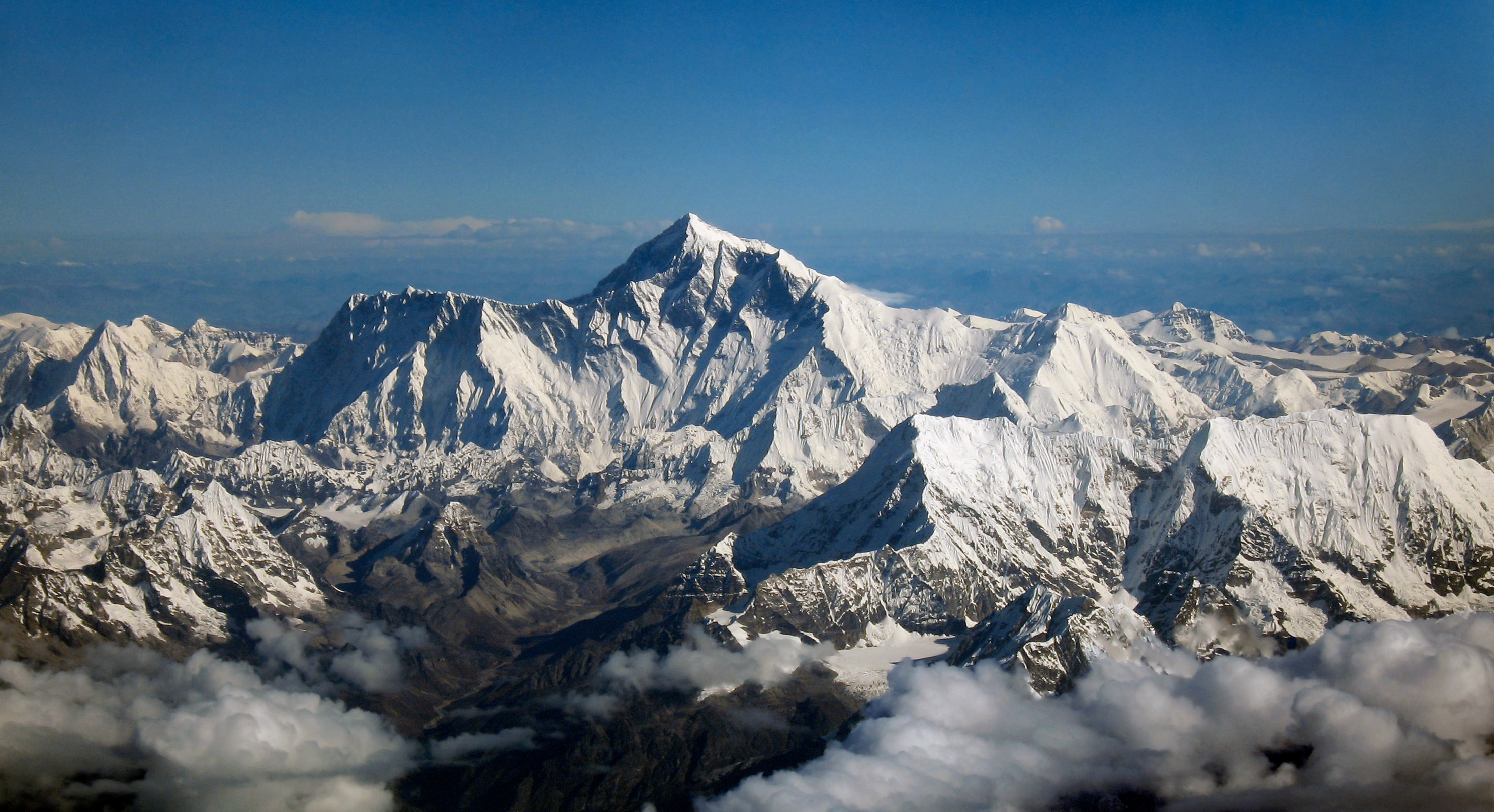
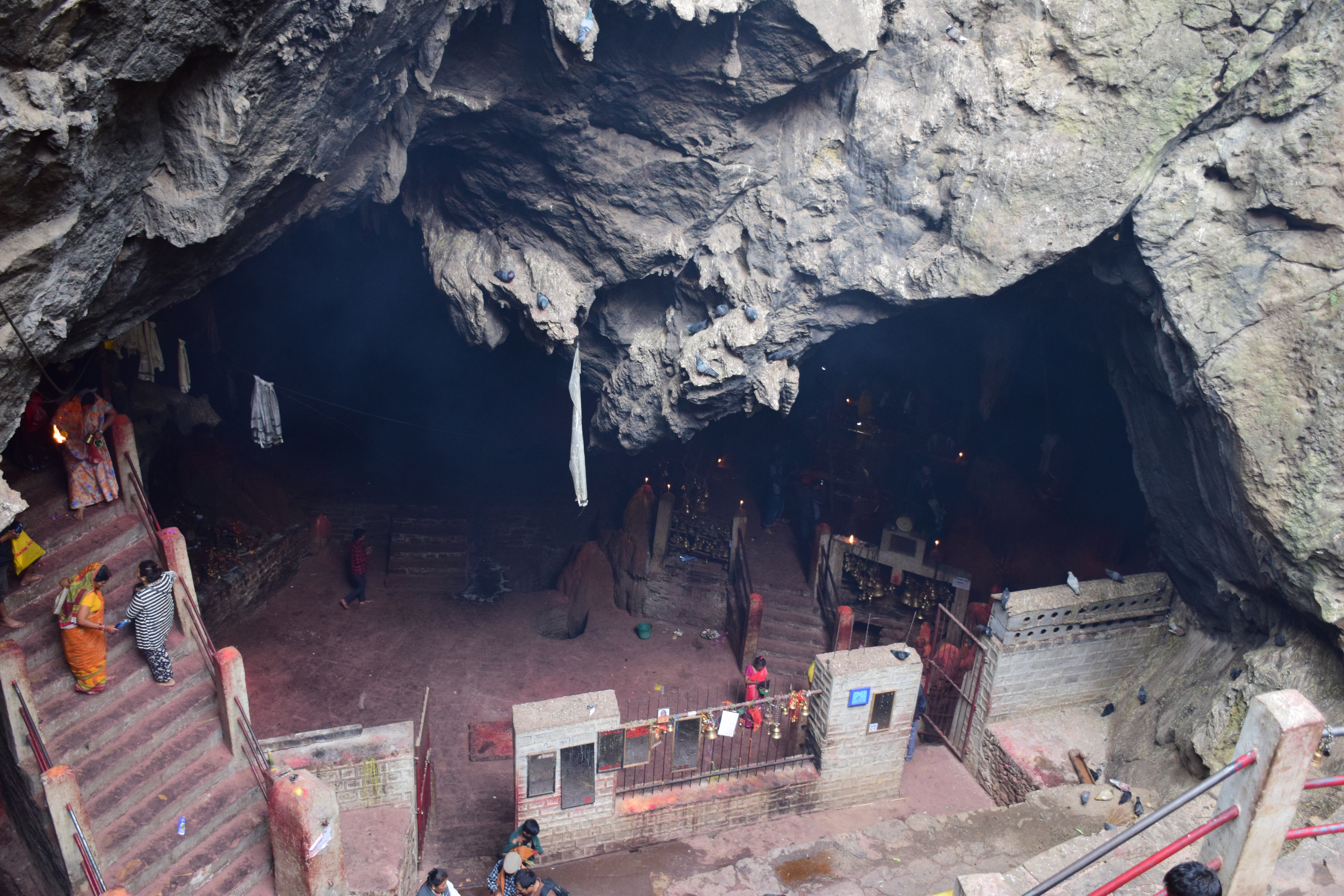
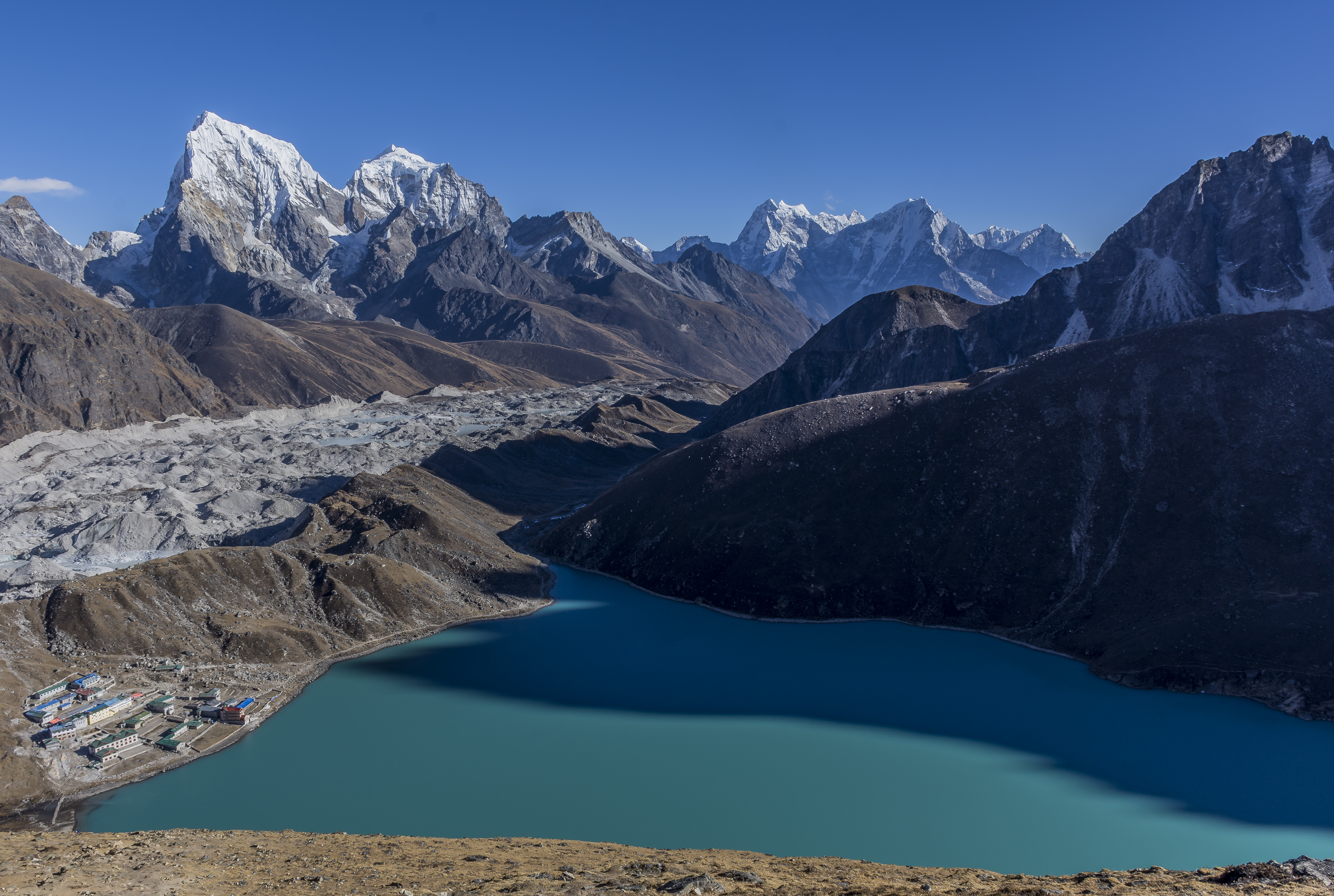
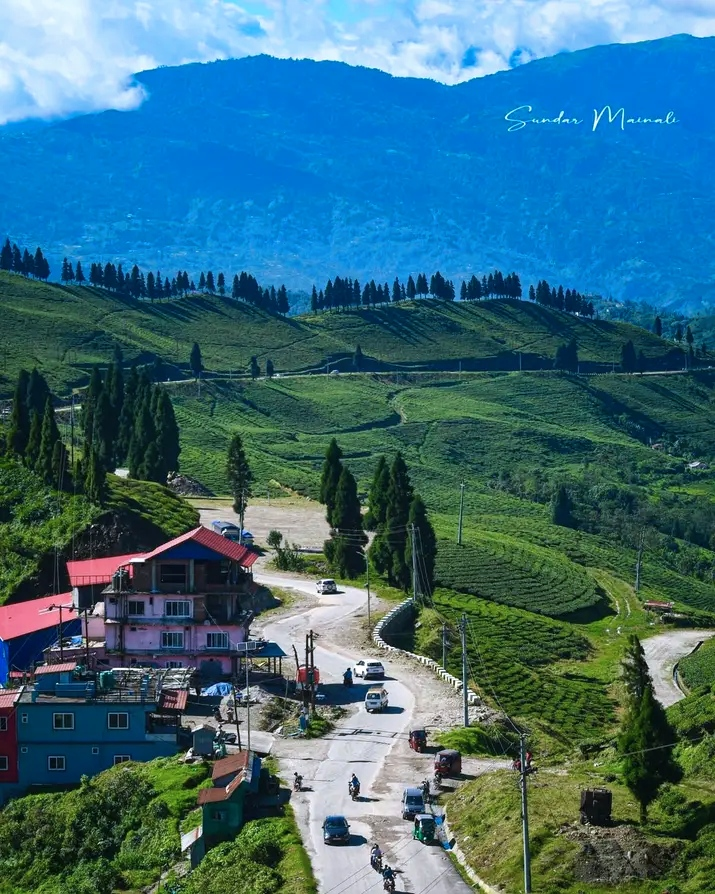
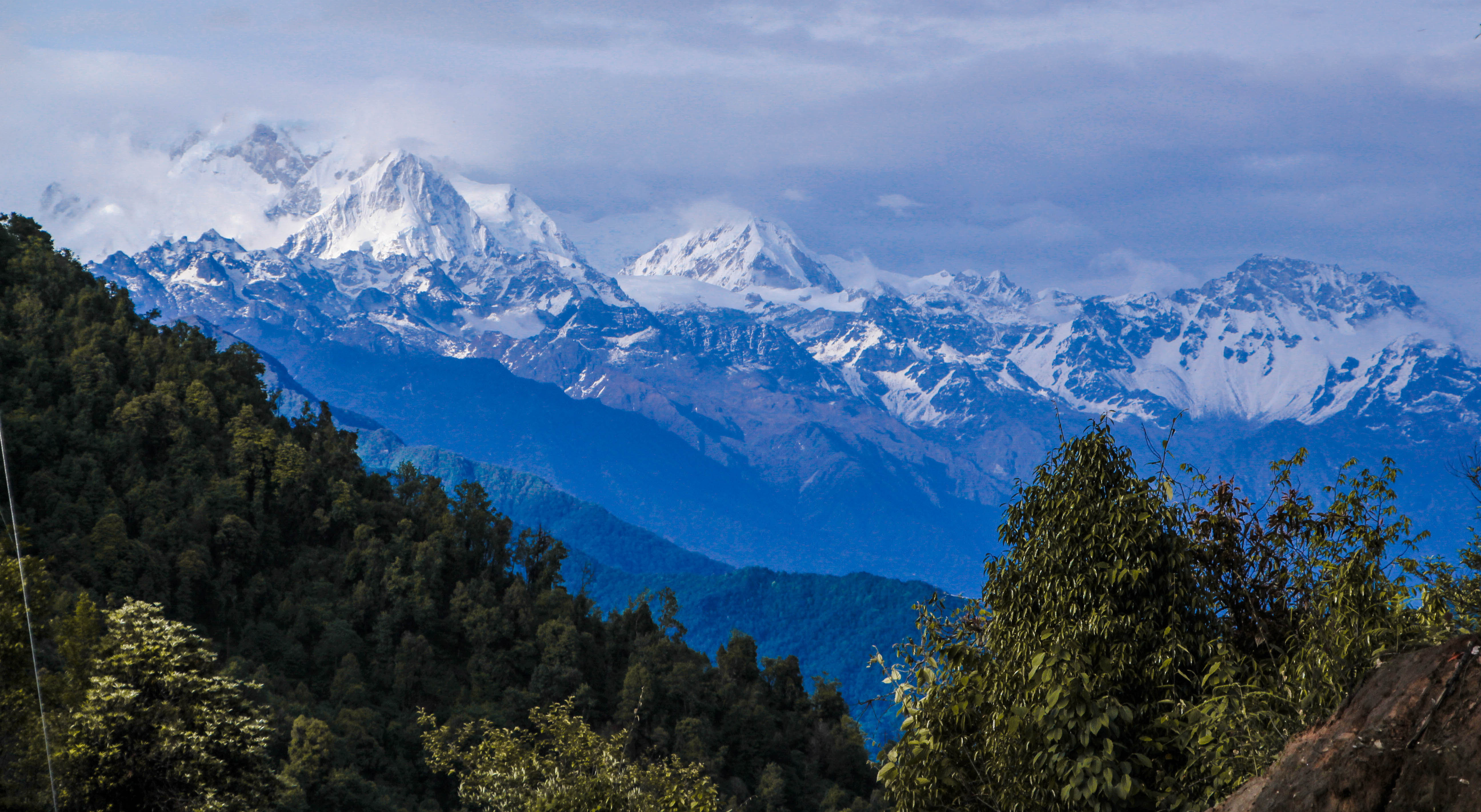
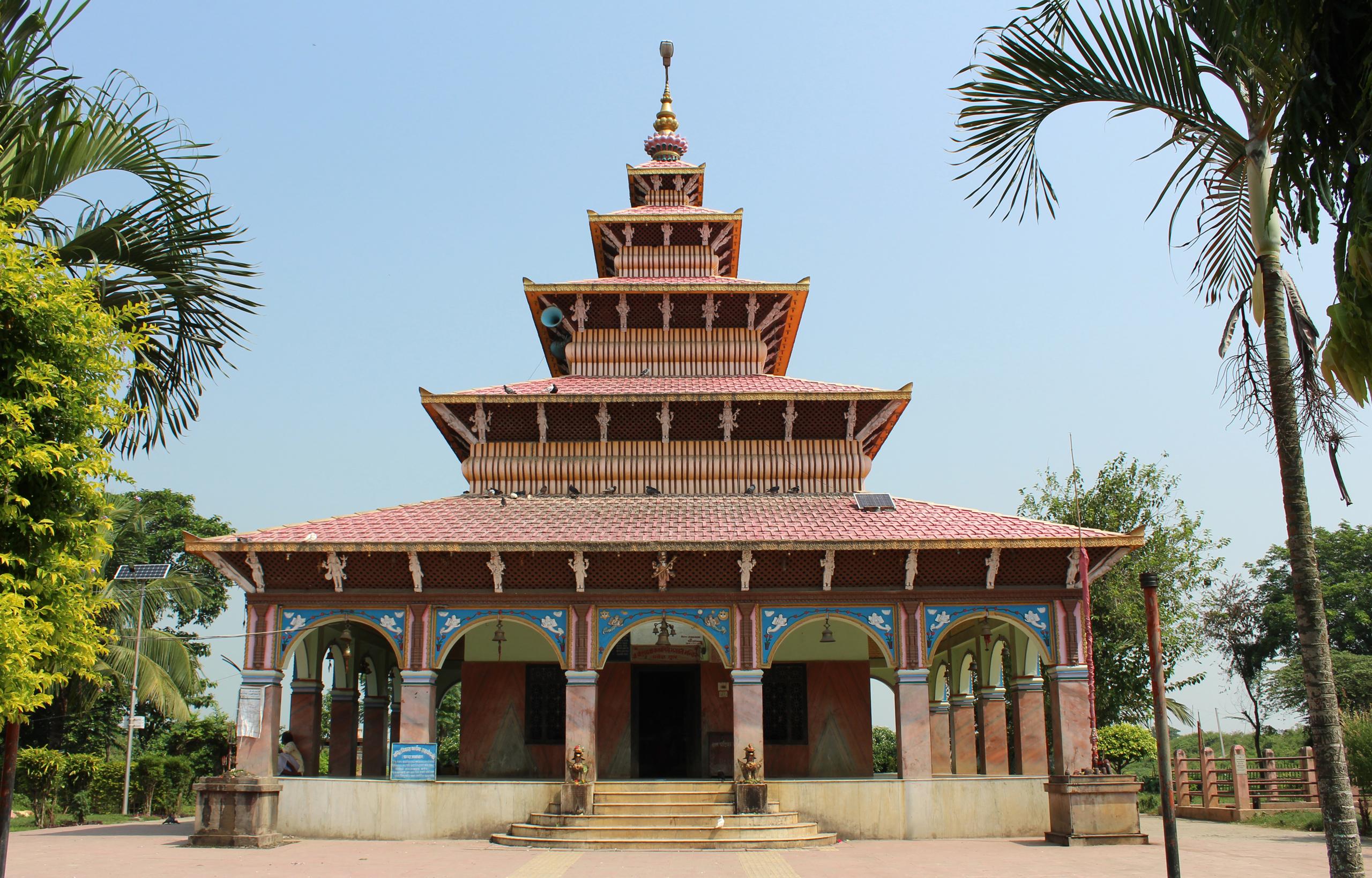
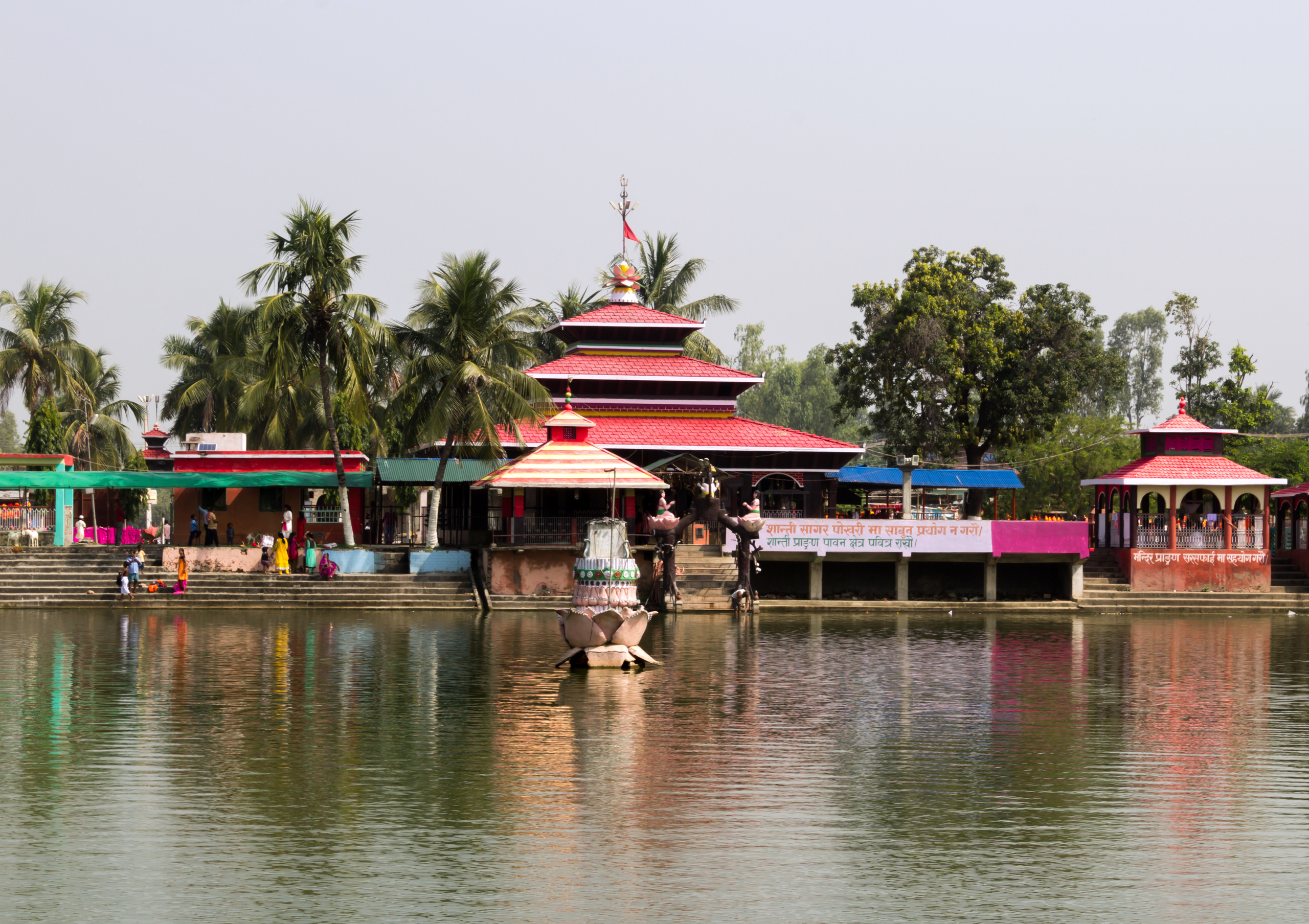
- From top left to right Mount Everest, Halesi Mahadev Temple, Gokyo Lakes, Kanyam Ilam, Kanchenjunga, Kankalini Temple, Chinnamasta Bhagawati Temple
- Interactive map of Eastern Development Region
- Country: Nepal
- Established: 1972
- Disestablished: 2015
- Founder: King Mahendra
- Headquarters: Dhankuta, Kosi Zone
- Largest city: Biratnagar
- Zones: List: Mechi Zone; Kosi Zone; Sagarmatha Zone; (Now parts of Koshi Province and Madhesh Province)

Government
  - Type: Regional Administration
  - Body: Eastern Development Regional Administration

Area
  - Total: 28,456 km^{2} (10,987 sq mi)
- Highest elevation: 8,848 m (29,029 ft)
- Lowest elevation: 59 m (194 ft)

Population (2011 Census)
  - Total: 5,811,555
  - Density: 204.23/km^{2} (528.95/sq mi)
- pop. note
- Demonym: Purbeli
- Time zone: UTC+5:45 (NPT)
- Official language: Nepali
- HDI (2021): 0.598 (medium)

The Eastern Development Region (Nepali: पुर्वाञ्चल विकास क्षेत्र, Purwānchal Bikās Kshetra) was one of Nepal's five development regions. It is also known as Kirata region. It was located at the eastern end of the country with its headquarters at Dhankuta. The town of Dhankuta was the headquarter of the Eastern Region, as well as the headquarter of the Dhankuta District.

== History ==
On April 13, 1961 Mahendra, the king of Nepal, divided the existing 35 districts into 75 districts and grouped them into 14 administrative zones.

In 1972, the King of Nepal grouped 14 zones into total 4 development regions, thus Eastern Development Region came into existence.

On 20 September 2015, Eastern Development Region including all other development regions of Nepal were abolished, when the new Constitution of Nepal-2015 was proclaimed. The total area of the region was 28,456 km².

== Administrative divisions ==
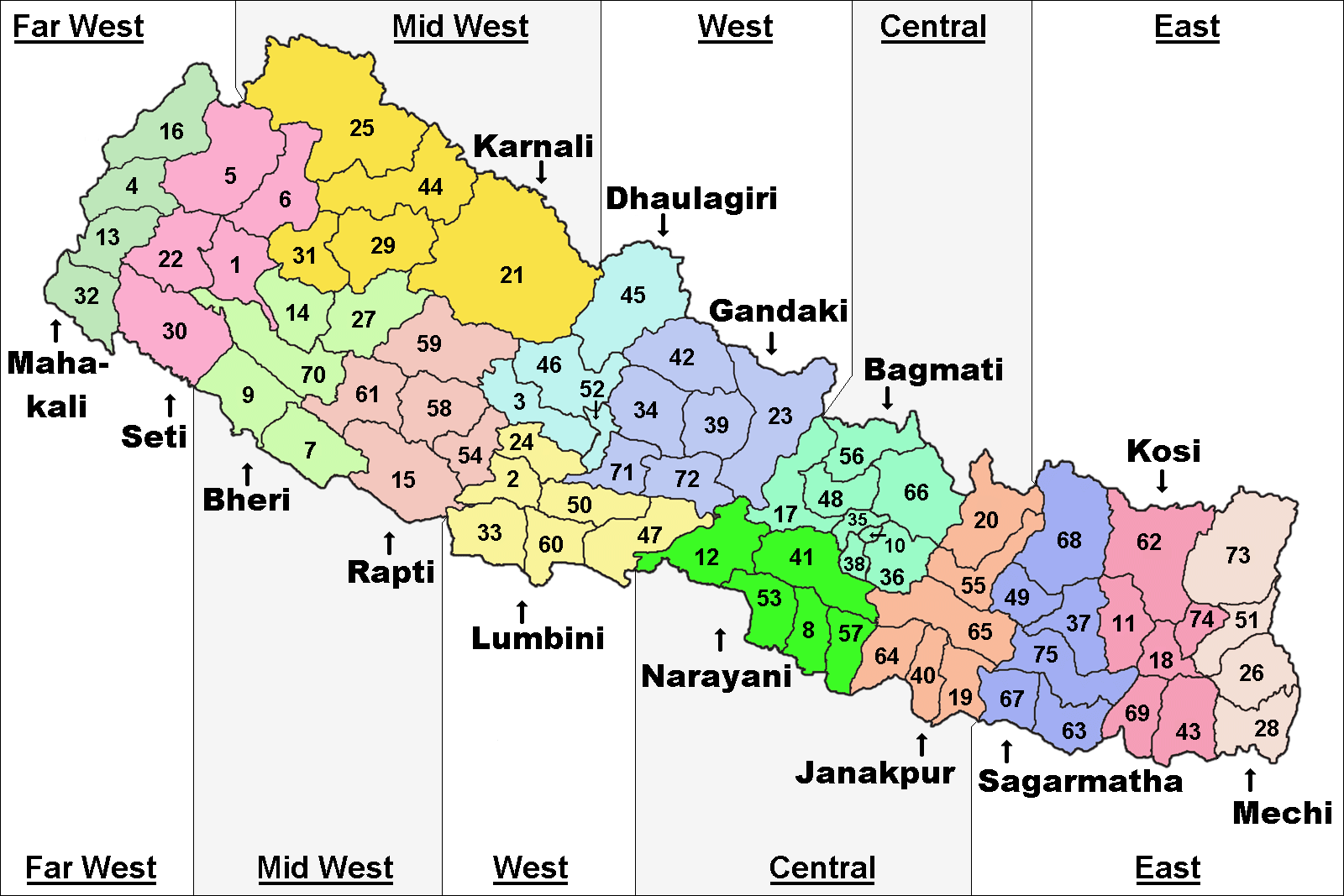

The region administratively was divided into 3 zones and 16 districts. Each zone contained 4 or more districts. Districts were divided into municipalities and village development committees.

=== Zones ===
The Eastern Development Region was split into 3 zones:

- Sagarmatha
- Kosi
- Mechi

=== Districts ===
The region was made up of the 16 districts. Mechi Zone contained 4 districts whereas 2 other zones Kosi Zone and Sagarmatha Zone contained 6-6 districts.

Eastern Development Region
Mechi Zone	Kosi Zone	Sagarmatha Zone
1. Panchthar District; 2. Taplejung District; 3. Ilam District; 4. Jhapa District	1. Bhojpur District; 2. Morang District; 3. Sankhuwasabha District; 4. Dhankuta District; 5. Sunsari District; 6. Terhathum District	1. Solukhumbu District; 2. Khotang District; 3. Okhaldhunga District; 4. Udayapur District; 5. Siraha District; 6. Saptari District

=== Municipalities ===
Before 2014, the total number of municipalities in Nepal was 58, of which 14 municipalities were located in Eastern Development Region.

#	Municipality	District	Zones
1	Illam	Ilam	Mechi Zone
2	Bhadrapur	Jhapa District	Mechi Zone
3	Damak	Jhapa District	Mechi Zone
4	Mechinagar	Jhapa District	Mechi Zone
5	Biratnagar (metro)	Morang District	Kosi Zone
6	Dharan	Sunsari District	Kosi Zone
7	Dhankuta	Dhankuta District	Kosi Zone
8	Inaruwa	Sunsari District	Kosi Zone
9	Itahari	Sunsari District	Kosi Zone
10	Khandbari	Sankhuwasabha District	Kosi Zone
11	Rajbiraj	Saptari District	Sagarmatha Zone
12	Lahan	Siraha District	Sagarmatha Zone
13	Siraha	Siraha District	Sagarmatha Zone
14	Triyuga	Udayapur District	Sagarmatha Zone
15	Bhojpur	Bhojpur District	Koshi Zone

=== VDCs ===
VDCs or Village development committees were local level body ruling in rural (village) area. There were thousands of VDCs in Nepal.

List of VDCs (by zones)

Mechi Zone

==== Ilam District ====
Amchok, Bajho, Barbote, Chamaita, Chisapani, Chulachuli, Danabari, Ebhang, Ektappa, Emang, Erautar, Gajurmukhi, Godak, Gorkhe, Jamuna, Jirmale, Jitpur, Jogmai, Kolbung, Lakshmipur, Lumbe, Mabu, Mahamai, Maimajhuwa, Maipokhari, Namsaling, Naya Bazar, Pashupatinagar, Phakphok, Phuyatappa, Puwamajwa, Pyang, Sakphara, Sakhejung, Samalpung, Sangrumba, Shanti Danda, Shantipur, Siddhithumka, Soyak, Soyang, Sri Antu, Sulubung, Sumbek

==== Jhapa District ====
Anarmani, Bahundangi, Baigundhara, Balubari, Baniyani, Budhabare, Chakchaki, Chandragadhi, Charpane, Dangibari, Dhaijan, Dharmpur, Duhagadhi, Garamani, Gauriganj, Gherabari, Goldhhap, Haldibari, Jalthal, Jyamirgadhi, Kechana, Khajurgachhi, Khudunabari, Korobari, Kumarkhod, Lakhanpur, Mahabhara, Maheshpur, Panchganchi, Pathabhari, Pathariya, Prithivinagar, Rajgadh, Shantinagar, Sharanamati, Taghanduba, Topgachchi sanichare

==== Panchthar District ====
Ranitar, Luwamphu, Yangnam, Nangin, Lungrupa, Ambarpur, Panchami, Subhang, Bharapa, Yasok, Rani Gaun, Mangjabung, Syabarumba, Aarubote, Sarangdanda, Rabi, Kurumba, Limba, Durdimba, Ektin, Memeng, Prangbung, Yangnam, Sidin, Nawamidanda, Imbung, Pauwa Sartap, Chilingdin, Aangsarang, Phaktep, Aangna, Olane, Hangum, Mauwa, Chyangthapu, Phalaicha, Oyam, Tharpu, Nagi

==== Taplejung District ====
Ambegudin, Ankhop, Chaksibote, Change, Dhungesaghu, Dummrise, Ekhabu, Hangdeva, Hangpang, Kalikhola, Khamlung, Khejenim, Khewang, Khokling, Lelep, Limbudin, Lingtep, Linkhim, Liwang, Mamangkhe, Nalbu, Nankholyang, Nidhuradin, Olangchung Gola, Paidang, Papung, Pedang, Phakumba, Phawakhola, Phulbari, Phurumbu, Sadewa, Sangu, Santhakra, Sawa, Sawadin, Sawalakhu, Sikaicha, Sinam, Surumakhim, Tapethok, Tellok, Thechambu, Thinglabu, Thukima, Thumbedin, Tiringe, Yamphudin

Kosi Zone

==== Bhojpur District ====
Aamtep, Annapurna, Baikuntha, Basikhola, Basingtharpur, Bastim, Bhubal, Bhulke, Boya, Champe, Changre, Charambi, Chaukidada, Chhinamukh, Dalgaun, Deurali, Dewantar, Dhodalekhani, Dobhane, Dummana, Gogane, Gupteshwar, Gopal, Helauchha, Homtang, Jarayotar, Khairang, Khatamma, Khawa, Kot, Kudak Kaule, Kulunga, Lekharka, Mane Bhanjyang, Nagi, Nepaledanda, Okhre, Pangcha, Patle Pani, Pawala, Pyauli, Ranibas, Sangpang, Sano Dumba, Shyamsila, Siddheshwar, Sindrang, Syamsila, Thidingkha, Thulo Dumba, Timma, Tiwari Bhanjyang, Walangkha, Yaku, Yangpang

==== Dhankuta District ====
Ahale, Ankhisalla, Arkhaule Jitpur, Basantatar, Belhara, Budhabare, Bhirgaun, Bodhe, Budhabare, Budi Morang, Chanuwa, Chhintang, Chungmang, Danda Bazar, Dandagaun, Hathikharka, Jitpur Arkhaule, Khoku, Khuwaphok, Kuruletenupa, Leguwa, Mahabharat, Marek Katahare, Maunabuthuk, Mudebas, Murtidhunga, Parewadin, Phaksib, Raja Rani, Tankhuwa, Telia, Vedatar

==== Morang District ====
Amaibariyati, Amardaha, Bavanadov, Babiya Birta, Bahuni, Banigama, Baradanga, Bayarban, Bhaudaha, Budhanagar, Dainiya, Dangihat, Dangraha, Darbairiya, Drabesh, Gopal, Hasandaha, Hathimudha, Hoklabari, Itahara, Jante, Jhapa Baijanathpur, Jhorahat, Jhurkiya, Kadamaha, Katahari, Kathamaha, Kerabari, Keroun, Lakhantari, Madhumalla, Mahadeva, Majhare, Matigachha, Motipur, Nocha, Patigaun, Pokhariya, Rajghat, Ramite Khola, Sidharaha, Sijuwa, Sinhadevi Sombare, Sisabanibadahara, Sisawanijahada, Sorabhaj, Tandi, Tankisinuwari, Tetariya, Thalaha, Warangi, Yangshila

==== Sankhuwasabha District ====
Ankhibhui, Bahrabise, Bala, Chepuwa, Dhupu, Diding, Hatiya, Jaljala, Kimathanka, Madi Mulkharka, Madi Rambeni, Makalu, Malta, Mamling, Manakamana, Mangtewa, Matsya Pokhari, Mawadin, Num, Nundhaki, Pangma, Pathibhara, Pawakhola, Savapokhari, Sisuwakhola, Sitalpati, Syabun, Tamaphok, Tamku, Yaphu

==== Sunsari District ====
Aekamba, Amaduwa, Amahibelaha, Aurabarni, Babiya, BarjuBakalauri, Barahachhetra, Basantapur, Bharaul, Bhokraha, Bishnupaduka, Chadwela, Chhitaha, Chimdi, Dewanganj, Ghuski, Dumaraha, Gautampur, Hanshpokha, Harinagar, Haripur, Jalpapur, Kaptanganj, Khanar, Laukahi, Madheli, Madhesa, Madhuwan, Madhyeharsahi, Mahendranagar, Narshinhatappu, Pakali, Panchakanya, Paschim Kasuha, Prakashpur, Purbakushaha, Ramganj Belgachhi, Ramganj Senuwari, Ramnagar Bhutaha, Sahebganj, Santerjhora, Simariya, Sonapur, Sripurjabdi, Tanamuna

==== Terhathum District ====
Angdim, Basantapur, Chhate Dhunga, Chuhandanda, Dangpa, Hamarjung, Hawaku, Isibu, Jaljale, Khamlalung, Morahang, Okhare, Oyakjung, Panchakanya Pokhari, Phakchamara, Phulek, Pauthak, Sabla, Samdu, Sankranti Bazar, Simle, Solma, Sri Jung, Sudap, Sungnam, Thoklung

Sagarmatha Zone

==== Khotang District ====
Ainselu Kharka, Arkhale, Badahare, Badka Dipali, Bahunidanda, Bakachol, Baksila, Barahapokhari (VDC), Baspani, Batase, Bijaya Kharka, Buipa, Chhitapokhari, Chhorambu, Chipring, Chisapani, Chyandanda, Chyasmitar, Damarkhu Shivalaya, Dandagaun, Devisthan, Dharapani, Dhitung, Dikuwa, Diplung, Dipsung, Dorpa Chiuridanda, Dubekol, Dumre Dharapani, Durchhim, Hanchaur, Indrayani Pokhari, Jalapa, Jyamire, Kaule, Kharmi, Kharpa, Khartamchha, Khidima, Khotang Bazar, Kuvinde, Lamidanda, Lichki Ramche, Linkuwa Pokhari, Magpa, Mahadevasthan, Mangaltar, Mattim Birta, Mauwabote, Nerpa, Nirmalidanda, Nunthala, Patheka, Pauwasera, Phaktang, Phedi, Rajapani, Rakha Bangdel, Rakha Dipsung, Ratancha Majhagaun, Ribdung Jaleshwari, Ribdung Maheshwari, Salle, Santeshwar Chhitapokhari, Sapteshwar, Saunechaur, Sawakatahare, Simpani, Sungdel, Suntale, Woplukha, Wopung, Yamkhya

==== Okhaldhunga District ====
Baksa, Balakhu, Baraneshwar, Betini, Bhadaure, Bhussinga, Bigutar, Bilandu, Chyanam, Diyale, Gamnangtar, Harkapur, Jantarkhani, Kalikadevi, Kaptigaun, Katunje, Ketuke, Khiji Chandeshwari, Khijiphalate, Kuibhir, Kuntadevi, Madhavpur, Mamkha, Manebhanjyang, Moli, Mulkharka, Narmedeshwar, Okhaldhunga, Palapu, Patle, Phediguth, Phulbari, Pokhare, Pokli, Prapchan, Ragani, Rajadip, Raniban, Ratmata, Rawadolu, Serna, Srichaur, Singhadevi, Sisneri, Taluwa, Tarkerabari, Thakle, Thoksela, Thulachhap, Ubu, Vadaure, Yasam

==== Saptari District ====
Arnaha, Aurahi, Bainiya, Bairawa, Bakdhauwa, Bamangamakatti, Banarjhula, Banaula, Banauli, Barhmapur, Barsain, Basbiti, Bathnaha, Belhi, Belhi Chapena, Bhagawatpur, Bhardaha, Bhutahi, Birpur Barahi, Bishariya, Budebarsaien, Boriya, Brahmapur, Chhinnamasta, Dauda, Daulatpur, Deuri, Deurimaruwa, Dhanagadi, Didhawa, Diman, Gamhariya Parwaha, Goithi, Hardiya, Hariharpur, Haripur, Inarwa Phulbariya, Itahari Bishnupur, Jamuni Madhapura, Jandaul, Jhutaki, Kabilash, Kachan, Kalyanpur, Kataiya, Khadgapur, Khojpur, Ko. Madhepura, Kochabakhari, Koiladi, Kushaha, Lalapati, Launiya, Lohajara, Madhawapur, Madhupati, Mahadeva, Maina Kaderi, Maina Sahasrabahu, Malekpur, Maleth, Malhanama, Malhaniya, Manraja, Mauwaha, Nargho, Negada, Pakari, Pansera, Parasbani, Paterwa, Pato, Patthargada, Phakira, Pharseth, Phulkahi, Pipra (West), Portaha, Ramnagar, Rampur Malhaniya, Rautahat, Rayapur, Sankarpura, Sarashwar, Simraha Sigiyaun, Siswa Beihi, Sitapur, Tarahi, Terahota, Tikuliya, Tilathi, Trikola Rajgadh-2 kamalpur

==== Siraha District ====
Arnama Lalpur, Arnama Rampur, Aurahi, Badharamal, Barchhawa, Bariyarpatti, Basbita, Bastipur, Belaha, Bhadaiya, Bhagawanpur, Bhagawatipur, Bhawanpur Kalabanchar, Bhokraha, Bishnupur Pra. Ma., Bishnupur Pra. Ra., Brahmagaughadi, Chandra Ayodhyapur, Chatari, Chikana, Devipur, Dhodhana, Dumari, Durgapur, Gadha, Gauripur, Gautari, Govindapur Malahanama, Govindpur Taregana, Hakpara, Hanuman Nagar, Harakathi, Inarwa, Itarhawa, Itari Parsahi, Itatar, Janakinagar, Jighaul, Kabilasi, Kachanari, Kalyanpur Jabadi, Kalyanpur Kalabanchar, Karjanha, Kharukyanhi, Khirauna, Krishnapur Birta, Lagadi Gadiyani, Lagadigoth, Lakshminiya, Lakshmipur (Pra. Ma.), Lakshmipur Patari, Madar, Mahadewa Portaha, Mahanaur, Maheshpur Patari, Majhauliya, Majhaura, Makhanaha, Malhaniya Gamharia, Mauwahi, Media, Nahara Rigaul, Naraha Balkawa, Navarajpur, Padariya Tharutol, Pipra Pra. Dha., Pipra Pra. Pi, Pokharbhinda, Rajpur, Sakhuwanankarkatti, Sanhaitha, Sarashwar, Sikron, Sisawani, Sonmati Majhaura, Sothayan, Sukhachina, Tenuwapati, Thalaha Kataha, Thegahi, Tulsipur

==== Solukhumbu District ====
Baku, Bapha, Basa, Beni, Bhakanje, Bung, Chaulakharka, Chaurikharka, Chheskam, Deusa, Goli, Gorakhani, Gudel, Jubing, Jubu, Kaku, Kangel, Kerung, Khumjung, Lokhim, Mabe, Mukali, Namche, Necha Batase, Necha Bedghari, Nele, Panchan, Salyan, Sautang, Takasindu, Tapting, Tingla

==== Udayapur District ====
Aaptar, Balaltar, Baraha, Barai, Basabote, Bhumarashuwa, Bhuttar, Chaudandi, Dumre, Hadiya, Hardeni, Iname, Jalpachilaune, Janti, Jogidaha, Katunjebawala, Khanbu, Laphagaun, Lekhani, Lekhgau, Limpatar, Mainamiani, Myakhu, Nametar, Okhale, Panchawati, Pokhari, Rauta, Risku, Rupatar, Saune, Shorung Chabise, Sirise, Sithdipur, Sundarpur, Tamlichha, Tapeshwari, Tawasri, Thanagaun, Thoksila, Valaya Danda, Yayankhu
