= Gramthan Rural Municipality =

Gramthan Gaupalika
- Gaupalika
- Gramthan Gaupalika in the map
- Coordinates: 26.57°N 87.35°E
- country: Nepal
- Province: Koshi Province
- District: Morang District
- established: 27 Falgun 2073

Government
  - Chairperson अध्यक्ष: Mr. Jay Prakash Gachhadar (NC)
  - Vice-chairperson उपाध्यक्ष: Mrs. Gunabati Devi Tharu (NCP)

Area
  - Total: 71.84 km^{2} (27.74 sq mi)

Population (2017)
  - Total: 32,717
  - Density: 455.4/km^{2} (1,180/sq mi)
  - Ethnic Groups: Tharu
  - Religions: Hinduism

Languages
  - Official: Nepali, Tharu, Maithili, Jhangad
  - Local: Tharu
- Time zone: UTC+5:45 (Nepal Standard Time)
- Postal code: बनिगामा 56616 वडा नं ७ / झोराहाट 56615 वडा नं २ / मोरङ 56600
- Area code: +977-021
- Office: Present Tetariya Office
- Website: official website

Gramthan (Nepali: ग्रामथान गाउँपालिका) is a Gaupalika (rural municipality) located in Morang District of Koshi Province, Nepal. It was formed by merging the former Village Development Committees of Lakhantari, Sidharaha, Tetariya, Jhorahat, Motipur, and Banigama. The rural municipality covers an area of 71.84 km^{2} and consists of seven wards. According to the municipal profile, it has 9,377 households and a population of 36,024. Gramthan is bordered by Rangeli Municipality and Belbari Municipality to the east, Budhiganga Rural Municipality to the west, Sundar Haraicha Municipality to the north, and Biratnagar Metropolitan City and Katahari Rural Municipality to the south. The municipality is situated at an elevation of approximately 73 metres above sea level, and the former VDC office at Tetariya serves as the municipal office.
