= Meringden Rural Municipality =

Human settlement in eastern Nepal

Meringden མེ་རིང་ལྡན་གྲོང་གསེབ་གྲོང་ཁྱེར
- མེ་རིང་ལྡན་གྲོང་གསེབ་གྲོང་ཁྱེར
- Location in Nepal
- Coordinates: 27°30′35.99″N 87°31′47.78″E
- Country: Nepal
- Development Region: Eastern
- Zone: Mechi
- District: Taplejung
- Province: Province No. 1
- Rural Municipality: Meringden
- Established: 10 March 2017

Government
  - Type: Gaunpalika
  - Chairperson: Mr.Ganesh Bahadur Limbu (NC)
  - Vice-chairperson: Mrs.Kalpana Tumbahamphe (NCP)

Area
  - Total: 210 km^{2} (81 sq mi)

Population (2021)
  - Total: 11,838
  - Density: 56/km^{2} (150/sq mi)
- Time zone: UTC+5:45 (NST)
- Website: Official Website

Meringden is a Gaupalika (Nepali: गाउपालिका, romanized: gaupalika, formerly: village development committee) located in Taplejung District in the Mechi Zone of eastern Nepal. The local body was formed by merging five VDCs Thinglabu, Santhakra, Khamlung, Lingtep, Thukima, and Nalbu. Currently, it has a total of 6 wards.

== Demographics ==
The population of Meringden, as of the 2021 Nepal census, is 11,838.

The largest ethnic groups are Limbu, with 55.4% of the population, and Sherpa with 35.2% of the population. The most common religions are Kirat, with 51.4% of the population, and Bouddha with 37.2% of the population.

86% of the population work in agriculture.

== See also ==
- Taplejung District
