= Jahada Rural Municipality =

Jahada जहदा गाउँपालिका Laxminiya Bazzar
- Rural Municipality
- Location in Province No. 1 Jahada (Nepal)
- Coordinates: 26.39°N 87.35°E
- Province: Province No. 1
- District: Morang
- Wards: 7
- Established: 10 March 2017
- Seat: Majhare

Government
  - Type: Rural Council
  - Chairperson: Mr. Jitendra Prasad Shah (Nepali Congress)
  - Vice-chairperson: Mrs. Hanna Soren (Nepali Congress)

Area
  - Total: 62.38 km^{2} (24.09 sq mi)

Population (2011)
  - Total: 41,819
  - Density: 670.4/km^{2} (1,736/sq mi)
- Time zone: UTC+5:45 (Nepal Standard Time)
- Website: website

Jahada (Nepali: जहदा गाउँपालिका) is a rural municipality (gaunpalika) out of eight rural municipality located in Laxminiya Bazzar Morang District of Koshi Province of Nepal. There are a total of 17 municipalities in Morang in which 9 are urban and 8 are rural.

According to Ministry of Federal Affairs and Local Development Jahada has an area of 62.38 square kilometres (24.09 mi^{2}) and the total population of the municipality is 41819 as of Census of Nepal 2011. Now there is 47,639 population according to census 2021.

Matigachha, Majhare, Sisawanijahada, Pokhariya and Budhanagar which previously were all separate Village development committee merged to form this new local level body. Fulfilling the requirement of the new Constitution of Nepal 2015, Ministry of Federal Affairs and Local Development replaced all old VDCs and Municipalities into 753 new local level body (Municipality).

The rural municipality is divided into total 7 wards and the headquarter of this newly formed rural municipality is situated in Majhare.
