= Sunawarshi Municipality =

Sunwarshi सुनवर्षि नगरपालिका
- Municipality
- Sunwarshi Municipality
- Location of Sunwarshi in map of Koshi Province Sunwarshi (Nepal)
- Coordinates: 26.45°N 87.54°E
- Country: Nepal
- Province: Koshi
- District: Morang
- Wards: 9

Government
  - Type: Mayor–council
  - Body: Sunwarshi Municipality
  - Mayor: Shyam Prasad Rajbanshi (NCP)
  - Deputy Mayor: Mira Devi Das Kewrat (NCP)

Area
  - Total: 106.4 km^{2} (41.1 sq mi)

Population (2011)
  - Total: 50,758
- Time zone: UTC+5:45 (NST)
- Website: official website

Sunwarshi (Nepali: सुनवर्षि) is an urban municipality in Morang District of Province No. 1 of Nepal. It is one out of nine urban municipalities of Morang District.

The municipality was formed in March 2017 merging some former VDCs: e.g. Amardaha, Govindapur, Baradanga and Dainiya, also taken 3 wards from Rangeli Municipality.

The municipality is divided into 9 wards and total area of the municipality is 106.4 km^{2} and the population of the municipality is 50758, according to the census of Nepal in 2011. The sunawarshi Municipality name was given from oldest Sunawarshi Maharajthan.

It is surrounded by Ratuwamai in east, Rangeli and Kanepokhari in west, Pathari Sanischare in north and India in south.
