= Laxminiya Bazzar =

Laxminiya Bazzar जहदा गाउँपालिका Laxminiya chowk
- Rural Municipality
- Location in Province No. 1 Laxminiya Bazzar (Nepal)
- Coordinates: 26.39°N 87.35°E
- Province: Province No. 1
- District: Morang
- Wards: 7
- Established: 10 March 2017

Government
  - Type: Rural Council
  - Chairperson: Mr. Kailash Prasad Mandal (FSFN)
  - Vice-chairperson: Mrs. Shalo Devi Shah (FSFN)

Area
  - Total: 62.38 km^{2} (24.09 sq mi)

Population (2011)
  - Total: 41,819
  - Density: 670.4/km^{2} (1,736/sq mi)
- Time zone: UTC+5:45 (Nepal Standard Time)
- Headquarter: Majhare, Laxminiya Bazzar
- Website: website

Laxminiya Bazzar (Nepali: जहदा गाउँपालिका) is a village (gaunpalika), one of eight rural municipalities located in the Laxminiya Bazzar Morang District of Province No. 1 of Nepal. There are a total of 17 municipalities in Morang of which nine are urban and eight are rural.

According to the Ministry of Federal Affairs and Local Developme Jahada has an area of 62.38 square kilometres (24.09 mi^{2}) and the total population of the municipality is 41819 as of the Census of Nepal 2011.

Bhathigach, Majhare, Sisawanijahada, Pokhariya and Budhanagar which previously were all separate village development committees that merged to form this new local level body. Fulfilling the requirements of the new Constitution of Nepal 2015, Ministry of Federal Affairs and Local Development replaced all old VDCs and Municipalities into 753 new local level body (Municipality).

This rural municipality is divided into a total seven wards and the headquarters of this newly formed rural municipality is situated in Majhare.
