= Kerabari Rural Municipality =

Gaupalika in Province No. 1, Nepal

- Gaupalika
- Kerabari Gaupalika in the map
- Coordinates: 26.74°N 87.41°E
- country: Nepal
- Province: Province No. 1
- District: Morang District
- established: 27 Falgun 2073

Government
  - Chairperson: Suman Miringching Magar
  - Vice-chairperson: Man Maya Magar

Area
  - Total: 219.83 km^{2} (84.88 sq mi)

Population (2017)
  - Total: 30,431
  - Density: 138.43/km^{2} (358.53/sq mi)
- Time zone: UTC+5:45 (Nepal Standard Time)
- Postal code: 56600
- Area code: 021
- Office: Present Kerabari VDC Office
- Website: Official Website

Kerabari Rural Municipality (Nepali: केराबारी गाउँपालिका) is a Gaupalika (rural municipality) located at Morang district. Letang Bhogateni Municipality (Ward no.1), Kerabari, Yangshila, Singhadevi and Patigaun VDCs were incorporated into Kerabari Gaupalika. This rural municipality has an area of 219.83 km^{2}. The population as of 2017 is 30,431. The current VDC Office of Kerabari is the office of this Gaupalika.
