= Gaurigunj Rural Municipality =

Gauriganj गौरिगंज गाउँपालिका
- Rural Municipality
- Location in Province No. 1 Gauriganj (Nepal)
- Coordinates: 26.433333°N 87.733333°E
- Province: Province No. 1
- District: Jhapa
- Wards: 6
- Established: 10 March 2017
- Seat: Gauriganj

Government
  - Type: Village Council
  - Chairperson: Mrs. Fulwati Rajbanshi (NC)
  - Vice-chairperson: Mrs. Pujan Neupane (CPN-UML)

Area
  - Total: 101.35 km^{2} (39.13 sq mi)

Population (2011)
  - Total: 33,038
  - Density: 325.98/km^{2} (844.28/sq mi)
- Time zone: UTC+5:45 (Nepal Standard Time)
- Website: official website

Gauriganj (Nepali: गौरिगंज गाउँपालिका) is one of the seven rural municipalities (gaunpalika) located in Jhapa District of Province No. 1 of Nepal. Out of a total of 15 municipalities in Jhapa, eight are urban and seven rural.

According to Ministry of Federal Affairs and Local Developme Gauriganj has an area of 101.35 square kilometres (39.13 mi^{2}) and the total population of the municipality is 33038 as of Census of Nepal 2011.

Korobari, Mahabhara, Khajurgachhi and Gauriganj which previously were all separate Village development committee merged to form this new local level body. Fulfilling the requirement of the new Constitution of Nepal 2015, Ministry of Federal Affairs and Local Development replaced all old VDCs and Municipalities into 753 new local level body (Municipality).

The rural municipality is divided into six wards. The headquarter of this newly formed rural municipality is situated in Gauriganj.

== List of Chairman ==
=== Federal Democratic Republic of Nepal (2017–present) ===
No.	Portrait	Chairman	Took office	Left office	Time in office	Party	Election
1	Baburaja Shrestha	Baburaja Shrestha (बाबुराजा श्रेष्ठ)	7 July 2017	13 May 2022	4 years, 310 days	RPP	2017
2	Fulwati Rajbanshi	Fulwati Rajbanshi (फुलवति राजवंशी)	20 May 2022	incumbent	4 years, 132 days	Congress	2022
