= Miklajung Rural Municipality, Morang =

Miklajung Gaupalika
- Gaupalika
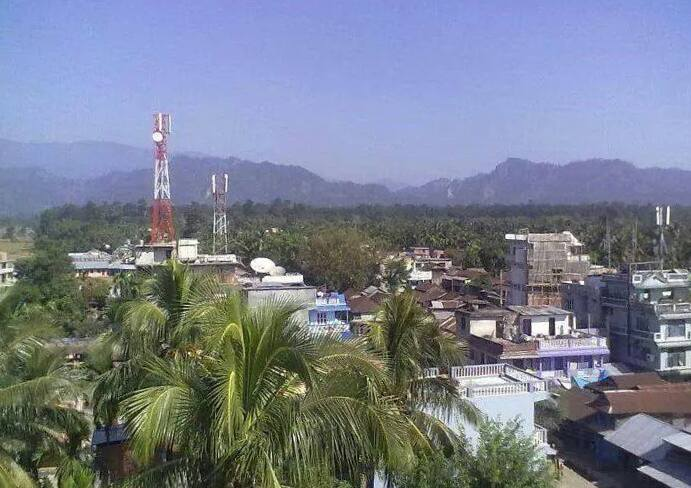
- Madhumalla, the centre of Miklajung

- Miklajung Gaupalika in the map
- Coordinates: 26.73°N 87.63°E
- country: Nepal
- Province: Province No. 1
- District: Morang District
- established: 27 Falgun 2073

Government
  - Chairperson: Babi Kumar Rai, NC
  - Vice-chairperson: Dinesh Poudel, Maoist Centre

Area
  - Total: 158.98 km^{2} (61.38 sq mi)

Population (2017)
  - Total: 28,708
  - Density: 180.58/km^{2} (467.69/sq mi)
- Time zone: UTC+5:45 (Nepal Standard Time)
- Area code: +977-021
- Office: Present Madhumalla VDC Office
- Website: official website

Miklajung (Nepali: मिक्लाजुङ गाउँपालिका) is a Gaupalika (rural municipality) located at Morang district. Ramite Khola, Jante (Ward No. 3&4), Tandi, and Madhumalla (Ward No.1-6) VDCs were incorporated into Miklajung Gaupalika. This rural municipality has an area of 158.98 km^{2}. The population as of 2017 is 28,708. The current VDC Office of Madhumalla is the office of this Gaupalika.
