= Yamphu language =

Kirati language of Nepal

Yamphu
- Region: Nepal
- Ethnicity: Kirat Yamphu
- Native speakers: 9,200 (2011 census); 2,500 Southern Yamphu (2011)
- Language family: Sino-Tibetan: Tibeto-Burman; Mahakiranti (?); Kiranti; Eastern; Upper Arun; Yamphu

Language codes
- ISO 639-3: ybi
- Glottolog: yamp1244
- ELP: Yamphu

Yamphu language is a Kirati language spoken by the Kirat Yamphu people, a Kirati people of the Himalayas of Nepal. Tomyang (Chongka) is a dialect spoken by only 20 people. Both it and Yamphe are distinct. Southern Yamphu is also considered to be Southern Kirat Lorung language. These varieties are all closely related.

== Geographical distribution ==
Yamphu is spoken in the following locations of Nepal:

- Sankhuwasabha District, Kosi Zone: Hedangna, Num, Seduwa, Peppuwa, Mangsimma, Karmarang, Tungkhaling, Uwa, Ala, Uling, and Walung villages
- Matsya Pokhari VDC, located in the upper Arun River valley in the Eastern hills; extreme north Lorung area, directly southwest of the Jaljale Mountains
- Bhojpur District, Kosi Zone
- Ilam district, Fikkal, Kolbung, Panchakanya, Jitpur, Danabari, Mahamai (VDCs).
- Jhapa district, Morang and Sunsari
- Darijiling, Sikkim, Silong, Meghalaya, Misoram, Barma, Bhutan and Thailand (Officially recorded)

However, Yamphu are dispersed all over the world including USA, Europe, South America, Africa and other continent of the world.

== Sources ==
- Rutgers, Roland (1998). Yamphu: Grammar, Texts & Lexicon. Leiden: Research School CNWS. – ISBN 90-5789-012-7
