= Kerabari =

Kerabari may refer to:

- Kerabari, Gandaki, Nepal
- Kerabari, Kosi, Nepal
- Kerabari Gaupalika, Nepal
