= Budhabare =

Budhabare may refer to:

- Budhabare, Koshi, a village development committee in Dhankuta District, Koshi Zone, Nepal
- Budhabare, Mechi, a village development committee in Jhapa district, Mechi Zone, Nepal
