= Jhapa (disambiguation) =

Jhapa may refer to:

== Location ==
- Jhapa District, a district in Nepal
  - Jhapa rural municipality, a rural municipality in Jhapa District
- Jhapa Baijanathpur, a village in Morang District

== Sports ==
- Jhapa Gold Cup, a football tournament held in Jhapa District
- Jhapa XI, a football club in Jhapa District
