= Rajghat, Morang =

Urlabari Municipality (Ward 8 and 9) Rajghat राजघाट
- Village development committee
- Location in Nepal
- Coordinates: 26.61°N 87.63°E
- Country: Nepal
- Zone: Koshi Zone
- District: Morang District

Government
  - Type: Local Bodies (Ward Level)

Population (2011)
  - Total: 12,535
- Time zone: UTC+5:45 (Nepal Time)
- Postal code: 56604
- Area code: 021
- Website: https://www.urlabarimun.gov.np/node/8?language=en

Rajghat is a small village in the Urlabari Municipality, comprising two wards; 8 and 9 in the Morang District in the Koshi Zone of south-eastern Nepal. It is located in North-East part of Morang and 1.5 kilometers south of the East West national highway of Nepal (Mahendra Highway, Urlabari). Durgapuri Bazar is the local town of Rajghat. It is one of the major habitats of indigenous Dhimal, Santhal, and Mushahar communities.

== Demography ==
Rajghat has a growing population, and the major ethnicities living there are Brahmins, Chhettri, Limbu, Rai, Tamang, Tharu, Newar, Dhimal, Santhal, Musahar and various others. Religions in Rajghat are Hindus, Kirants, Muslims, Buddhists, and Christians. As of 2011, National Population Census, the official total population of Rajghat stood at 12,535 and 2,803 households.

== Climate ==
The climate of Rajghat is hot and humid during summer, and mild and dry during winter. During the summer, temperatures can reach 35–36 °C (95 °F), and in winters it can go as low as 2 °C (35 °F). Rainfall is abundant during the monsoon season (June–September). There is little or no rainfall during winter, which makes it ideal for harvesting crops such as rice, wheat and mustard.

== Agriculture ==
Rajghat is one of the potential pocket areas of the Morang district in the context of agriculture productions. Maximum people of Rajghat are involved in the agricultural production; enhancing towards mechanization. Rice, maize, vegetables crop, tropical fruit crops, sugarcane, jute, etc. are the cultivated crops in Rajghat. Even though some farmers are adopting the new technologies for the improved cultivation techniques, the trend of switching occupations from farming to other has increased since a few decades ago.

== Politics ==
The political organizations in this VDC are Nepali Congress, CPN UML, UCPN Maoist, CPN (Unified Socialist, RPP, Sanghiya Limbuwan, etc. Both of the wards (Urlabari 8 & 9) have the newly elected local bodies from the Local Election 2079 (2022).

== Education ==
Araniko Higher Secondary School, Laxmi High School, Shishu Shiksha Sadan E. School, Pratibha Secondary School, Nebula Secondary School are the major educational institutions in Rajghat. As of now, there are no university level institutions and affiliated programs in Rajghat. Therefore, students from here prefers Urlabari, Damak, Biratnagar, Dharan and Kathmandu as their educational destinations.

== Road Networks and Transport ==
There is access of road network (at least mud road) in all area of Rajghat, majority of them are promoting to the metallic top or gravel. Buses, small jeep, electric and fuel based autos, rickshaws and motorbikes are the main sources of transportation. Besides, the bus leaves from Rajghat to Urlabari, Itahara, Sijuwa, Rangeli, Ithari, Damak, Birtamode, Kakarvitta, Biratnagar, Dharan, Itahari, Dhankuta and to Kathmandu as well. The nearest airport from Rajghat is Biratnagar Airport (IATA: BIR, ICAO: VNVT), which is about 55 kilometers away.
