= Katahari Rural Municipality =

Katahari Gaupalika
- Gaupalika
- Katahari Gaupalika in the map
- Coordinates: 26.47°N 87.32°E
- country: Nepal
- Province: Province No. 1
- Zone: Kosi Zone
- District: Morang District
- established: 2017
- Seat: Katahari

Government
  - Chairperson: Mr.Devraj chaudhary (NC)
  - Vice-chairperson: Mrs. Sita Devi Rajbansi (UML)

Area
  - Total: 51.59 km^{2} (19.92 sq mi)

Population (2017)
  - Total: 39,775
  - Density: 771.0/km^{2} (1,997/sq mi)
- Time zone: UTC+5:45 (Nepal Standard Time)
- Area code: +977-021
- Office: Katahari
- Website: Official website

Katahari Gaupalika rural municipality (Nepali: कटहरी गाउँपालिका), established in 2017, is a Gaupalika (rural municipality) located in the Morang District of the Kosi Zone in Province No. 1 of Nepal.

== Geography ==
Katahari, Thalaha and Bhaudaha VDCs were incorporated into Katahari Gaupalika.

This rural municipality has an area of 51.59 km^{2}. The population as of 2017 is 39,775.

The office of the Katahari Gaupalika rural municipality is in the town of Katahari, where the former Village development committee−VDC office was also.
