= Prithivinagar =

Prithivinagar पृथ्वीनगर
- Village development committee
- Location in Nepal
- Coordinates: 26.47°N 88.07°E
- Country: Nepal
- Province: Province No. 1
- District: Jhapa District

Population (1991)
  - Total: 15,612
- Time zone: UTC+5:45 (Nepal Time)

Prithvinagar or Prithvinagar is a village development committee in Jhapa District in the Province No. 1 of south-eastern Nepal. At the time of the 1991 Nepal census it had a population of 15,612 people living in 2799 individual households.

== History ==
In Panchayat era under the rule of late king Mahendra B. B. Shah and king Birendra B.B. Shah, many Nepalese people came to Prithvinagar for settlement. They were encouraged to take part in controlled deforestation program. The first settlers were awarded fertile land in return for their hard work. Later arrivals were less fortunate but was still provided with land. Remaining less fertile land was given to them then previous settlers. Many people from hills and various other parts of Nepal and India migrated to Prithvinagar during BS 2020 and 2030. People who came to Prithvinagar for settlement from India were of Nepalese origin. They were invited to return home with Ghar Farka Abhiyan (Return Home Campaign) by then prime minister B.P. Koirala. Land Reform program initiated by King Mahendra accelerated the inward movement of people in Prithvinagar.

There was not any recorded or unrecorded conflicts in settlement process. People from various ethnic communities came with their families. Nepalese of all walks of life worked together in harmony. They built roads, bridges, dames and canals. Most people got engaged in farming and agriculture activities; some started trade and business while others joined in service industry. Many youths of Prithvinagar joined military and police force, some traveled India for casual works, higher education, to join in Indian army and so forth. Those with higher ambition and physical stamina even joined in the British Army. Among those migrant Nepalese, some were retired army personnel from British and Indian arm forces, some were educated in India.

During Panchayat rule, late MR Kaman Sing Limbu served as village chief known locally as Pradhan Pancha. His deputy was Kul Prasad Sangraula. Kaman Sing was a popular and prominent figure during Panchayat rule in Prithvinagar. He was replaced by Mr. Hari Adhikari after successful democratic revolution of BS 2046 that ended Panchayat rule in Nepal. His deputy was Narapati Limbu. Hari Adhikari and Narapati Limbu along with the whole panel of Nepal Communist Party had elected in first local election in Prithvinagar.

In 1994, Bikas Ghimire published Factors Determining the Contraceptive Use in Nepal: Case Study of Prithivinagar Village, Jhapa. On February 2, 2001, an arson attack by Maoist insurgents took place at the Small Farmers Cooperative Office in Prithivinagar. On June 28, 2003, terrorist Man Maya Bishwokarma was killed by security forces in the VDC.

== Geography ==
Prithivinagar is situated in the southeastern corner of Nepal, and southeastern part of Jhapa District. The VDC is bordered by Jalthal to the west, Maheshpur to the north and east, Baniyani to the south and Pathmari to the southeast. The Mechi River flows to the east of the village on the India-Nepal border.

== Economy ==
Prithivinagar has been one of the village development committees which have been subject to the Nepali government's Land Reform Program, which was launched in 1964.

Still there is no any official economical statistics of Prithvinagar.
