= Nundhaki =

Nundhaki नुनढाकी
- Village development committee
- Location in Nepal
- Coordinates: 27.32°N 87.47°E
- Country: Nepal
- Zone: Kosi Zone
- District: Sankhuwasabha District

Population (1991)
  - Total: 2,613
- Time zone: UTC+5:45 (Nepal Time)

Nundhaki is a village development committee in Sankhuwasabha District in the Kosi Zone of north-eastern Nepal. At the time of the 1991 Nepal census it had a population of 2613 people living in 478 individual households. It is famous for Guphapokhari that lies 2,900 metres (9,500 ft) above the sea level.
