= Yamphudin =

Nepalese village development committee

Yamphudin याम्फुदिन
- Village development committee
- Location in Nepal
- Coordinates: 27.52°N 87.99°E
- Country: Nepal
- Province: Province No. 1
- District: Taplejung District

Population (1991)
  - Total: 764
- Time zone: UTC+5:45 (Nepal Time)

Yamphudin is a village development committee in the Himalayas of Taplejung District in the Province No. 1 of north-eastern Nepal. At the time of the 1991 Nepal census it had a population of 764 people living in 130 individual households. Yamphudin village lies in the route of Kanchenjunga Base Camp Trek, thus increasing the touristic activities in the area. 12 local houses have been modified into guest houses to accommodate climbers and trekkers.
