= Sarashwar =

Coordinates: 26°42′N 86°13′E

Sarashwar सारश्वर
- Village development committee
- Interactive map of Sarashwar
- Country: Nepal
- Zone: Sagarmatha Zone
- District: Siraha District

Population (1991)
  - Total: 4,839
- Time zone: UTC+5:45 (Nepal Time)
- Area code: 12

Sarashwar is a village development committee in Siraha District in the Sagarmatha Zone of south-eastern Nepal. At the time of the 1991 Nepal census it had a population of 4839 people living in 939 individual households.
