= Dummrise =

Dummrise डुम्रिसे
- Village development committee
- Location in Nepal
- Coordinates: 27.32°N 87.78°E
- Country: Nepal
- Province: Province No. 1
- District: Taplejung District

Population (2011)
  - Total: 1,559
- Time zone: UTC+5:45 (Nepal Time)

Dummrise is a village development committee in the Himalayas of Taplejung District in the Province No. 1 of north-eastern Nepal. At the time of the 2011 Nepal census it had a population of 1,559 people living in 324 individual households. There were 729 males and 830 females at the time of census.
