= Bishariya =

Former Village Development Committee in Nepal

Coordinates: 26°29′N 86°47′E

Bishariya विषहरिया
- Village development committee
- Interactive map of Bishariya
- Country: Nepal
- Zone: Sagarmatha Zone
- District: Saptari District

Population (2011)
  - Total: 7,120
- Time zone: UTC+5:45 (Nepal Time)

Bishariya is a village development committee in Saptari District in the Sagarmatha Zone of south-eastern Nepal. At the time of the 2011 Nepal census, it had a population of 7,120 people living in 1,410 individual households.
