= Warangi =

Warangi बारंगी
- Village development committee
- Location in Nepal
- Coordinates: 26.82°N 87.53°E
- Country: Nepal
- Zone: Kosi Zone
- District: Morang District

Population (1991)
  - Total: 2,745
- Time zone: UTC+5:45 (Nepal Time)

Warangi is a village development committee in Morang District in the Kosi Zone of south-eastern Nepal. At the time of the 1991 Nepal census it had a population of 2745 people living in 506 individual households.
