= Bamangamakatti =

Former Village Development Committee in Nepal

Babhangamakatti बभनगामाकट्टी
- Village development committee
- Location in Nepal
- Coordinates: 26.52°N 86.83°E
- Country: Nepal
- Zone: Sagarmatha Zone
- District: Saptari District

Population (2011)
  - Total: 8,068
- Time zone: UTC+5:45 (Nepal Time)

Bamangamakatti is a village development committee in Saptari District in the Sagarmatha Zone of south-eastern Nepal. At the time of the 2011 Nepal census it had a population of 8068 people living in 1331 individual households.
