= Basingtharpur =

Wasingtharpu वासिङथरपु
- Ward
- Location in Nepal
- Coordinates: 27.04°N 86.97°E
- Country: Nepal
- Province: Province No. 1
- District: Bhojpur District

Population (1991)
  - Total: 1,738
- Time zone: UTC+5:45 (Nepal Time)
- Postal code: 57000

Wasingtharpu is a Ward under the Aamchowk Rural Municipality in Bhojpur District in Province No. 1 of eastern Nepal. At the time of the 1991 Nepal census it had a population of 1738 persons living in 324 individual households.
