= Ibhang, Ilam =

Ibhang इभाङ
- Village Development Committee
- Country: Nepal
- Province: Province No. 1
- District: Ilam District

Population (1991)
  - Total: 4,373
- Time zone: UTC+5:45 (Nepal Time)

Ibhang is a town and Village Development Committee in Ilam District in the Province No. 1 of eastern Nepal. At the time of the 1991 Nepal census it had a population of 4,373 persons living in 755 individual households.
