= Lumbe =

Coordinates: 26°56′N 87°45′E

Lumde
- Village Development Committee
- Interactive map of Lumde
- Country: Nepal
- Province: Province No. 1
- District: Ilam District

Population (1991)
  - Total: 2,473
- Time zone: UTC+5:45 (Nepal Time)

Lumde is a village and Village Development Committee in Ilam District in the Province No. 1 of eastern Nepal. At the time of the 1991 Nepal census it had a population of 2,473 persons living in 449 individual households.

== Other meanings of the word ==
Lumbi or, Lombi, is also a stream in Bandundu Province of the Democratic Republic of the Congo. Lumbo is also a very common last name used in the Congo and Angola and has many spelling variations; Pierre Lumbi was a Zaire Minister of Foreign Affairs. Original name: Lumbi, Lombi geographical location: Bandundu, Democratic Republic of the Congo, Africa geographical coordinates: 4° 58' 0" South, 18° 0' 0" East Lumbi: This place is situated in Bandundu, Democratic Republic of the Congo, its geographical coordinates are 4° 58' 0" South, 18° 0' 0" East and its original name (with diacritics) is Lumbi.Lumbi in Democratic Republic of the Congo. The name Lumbi, originates in the democratic republic of the Congo and is a very common name there. The president of the democratic republic is Mr.Lumbi. The name has its origins dating thousands of years back to Africa has spelling variations
