= Bijaya Kharka =

Former Village Development Committee in Nepal

Coordinates: 28°13′06″N 83°39′57″E

Bijaya Kharka विजयखर्क
- Village Development Committee
- Interactive map of Bijaya Kharka
- Country: Nepal
- Zone: Sagarmatha Zone
- District: Khotang District

Population (1991)
  - Total: 2,590
- Time zone: UTC+5:45 (Nepal Time)

Bijaya Kharka is a village and Village Development Committee in Khotang District in the Sagarmatha Zone of eastern Nepal. At the time of the 1991 Nepal census it had a population of 2,590 persons living in 493 individual households.
