= Tiringe =

Tiringe तिरिङ्गे
- Village development committee
- Location in Nepal
- Coordinates: 27.35°N 87.75°E
- Country: Nepal
- Province: Province No. 1
- District: Taplejung District

Population (1991)
  - Total: 3,061
- Time zone: UTC+5:45 (Nepal Time)

Tiringe is a village development committee in the Himalayas of Taplejung District in the Province No. 1 of north-eastern Nepal. At the time of the 1991 Nepal census it had a population of 3061 people living in 543 individual households.
