= Manakamana, Sankhuwasabha =

Manakamana मनकामना
- Village development committee
- Country: Nepal
- Zone: Kosi Zone
- District: Sankhuwasabha District

Population (1991)
  - Total: 9,029
- Time zone: UTC+5:45 (Nepal Time)

Manakamana is a village development committee in Sankhuwasabha District in the Kosi Zone of north-eastern Nepal. At the time of the 1991 Nepal census it had a population of 9029 people living in 1830 individual households.
