= Paidang =

Paidang पेदाङ
- Village development committee
- Country: Nepal
- Province: Province No. 1
- District: Taplejung District

Population (2011)
  - Total: 1,701
- Time zone: UTC+5:45 (Nepal Time)

Paidang is a village development committee in the Himalayas of Taplejung District in the Province No. 1 of north-eastern Nepal. At the time of the 2011 Nepal census it had a population of 1701 people living in 344 individual households.
