= Srijung =

Srijung श्रीजुङ
- Village development committee
- Location in Nepal
- Coordinates: 27.26°N 87.51°E
- Country: Nepal
- Zone: Kosi Zone
- District: Terhathum District

Population (1991)
  - Total: 2,785
- Time zone: UTC+5:45 (Nepal Time)

Srijung is a village development committee in the Himalayas of Terhathum District in the Kosi Zone of eastern Nepal. At the time of the 1991 Nepal census it had a population of 2785 people living in 487 individual households.
