= Jyamirgadhi =

Jyamirgadhi ज्यामीरगढी
- Village development committee
- Location in Nepal
- Coordinates: 26.61°N 88.12°E
- Country: Nepal
- Province: Province No. 1
- District: Jhapa District

Population (1991)
  - Total: 8,210
- Time zone: UTC+5:45 (Nepal Time)

Jyamirgadhi is a village development committee in Jhapa District in Province No. 1 of south-eastern Nepal. At the time of the 1991 Nepal census it had a population of 8210 people living in 1510 individual households.
