= Baigundhura =

Coordinates: 26°30′N 87°46′E

Baigundhura बैगुन्धुरा
- Village development committee
- Interactive map of Baigundhura
- Country: Nepal
- Province: Province No. 1
- District: Jhapa District

Population (1991)
  - Total: 5,409
- Time zone: UTC+5:45 (Nepal Time)

Baigundhura is a village development committee in Jhapa District in Province No. 1 of south-eastern Nepal. At the 1991 Nepal census, it had a population of 5,409 people living in 983 individual households.
