= Ankhop =

Ankhop आङ्खोप
- Village development committee
- Location in Nepal
- Coordinates: 27.30°N 87.90°E
- Country: Nepal
- Province: Province No. 1
- District: Taplejung District

Population (2011)
  - Total: 2,346
- Time zone: UTC+5:45 (Nepal Time)

Ankhop is a village development committee in the Himalayas of Taplejung District in the Province No. 1 of north-eastern Nepal. At the time of the 2011 Nepal census it had a population of 2,346 people living in 451 individual households. There were 1,122 males and 1,224 females at the time of census.
