= Hasandaha =

Hasandaha chilajhar
- Village development committee
- Location in Nepal
- Coordinates: 26.579313°N 87.574918°E
- Country: Nepal
- Zone: Kosi Zone
- District: Morang District

Government

Population (1991)
  - Total: 10,615
- Time zone: UTC+5:45 (Nepal Time)

Hasandaha is a village development committee in Morang District in the Kosi Zone of south-eastern Nepal. At the time of the 1991 Nepal census it had a population of 10,615 people living in 1914 individual households.
