= Sawalakhu =

Sablakhu साब्लाखु
- Village development committee
- Location in Nepal
- Coordinates: 27.30°N 87.85°E
- Country: Nepal
- Province: Province No. 1
- District: Taplejung District

Population (432)
  - Total: 2,133
- Time zone: UTC+5:45 (Nepal Time)

Sablakhu is a village development committee in the Himalayas of Taplejung District in the Province No. 1 of north-eastern Nepal. At the time of the 2011 Nepal census it had a population of 2,133 people living in 432 individual households. There were 997 males and 1,136 females at the time of census.
