= Basbita =

Village development committee in Sagarmatha Zone, Nepal

Basbita बसबिटा
- Village development committee
- Country: Nepal
- Zone: Sagarmatha Zone
- District: Siraha District

Population (1991)
  - Total: 2,780
- Time zone: UTC+5:45 (Nepal Time)

Basbita is a village development committee in Siraha District in the Sagarmatha Zone of south-eastern Nepal. At the time of the 1991 Nepal census it had a population of 2780 people living in 507 individual households.
