= Hangdeva =

Hangdeva हाङदेवा
- Village development committee
- Location in Nepal
- Coordinates: 27.38°N 87.70°E
- Country: Nepal
- Province: Province No. 1
- District: Taplejung District

Population (2011)
  - Total: 3,605
- Time zone: UTC+5:45 (Nepal Time)

Hangdeva is a village development committee in the Himalayas of Taplejung District in the Province No. 1 of north-eastern Nepal. At the time of the 2011 Nepal census it had a population of 3,605 people living in 753 individual households. There were 1,683 males and 1,922 females at the time of census.
