= Balaltar =

Former Village Development Committee in Nepal

Balaltar बेलटार
- Village development committee
- Country: Nepal
- Zone: Sagarmatha Zone
- District: Udayapur District

Population (1991)
  - Total: 2,551
- Time zone: UTC+5:45 (Nepal Time)

Balaltar is a village development committee in Udayapur District in the Sagarmatha Zone of south-eastern Nepal. At the time of the 1991 Nepal census it had a population of 2551 people living in 460 individual households.
