= Santerjhora =

Shantinagar
- Location in Nepal
- Coordinates: 26.65°N 87.17°E
- Country: Nepal
- Zone: Kosi Zone
- District: Sunsari District

Population (1991)
  - Total: 9,351
- Time zone: UTC+5:45 (Nepal Time)

SHANTINAGAR (oldname: shantijhoda) was a Village Development Committee, until it became municipality in Sunsari District in the Kosi Zone of south-eastern Nepal. At the time of the 1991 Nepal census it had a population of 9351.

Shantinagar, it comes under ITAHARI municipality, ward no is 2. Shantinagar has some beautiful places like, budha subba temple, taal-talaiya, etc. The largest forest of Nepal, Char Koshe Jhadi, touches this place. The beautiful forest has contributed to the beauty of Shantinagar. Shera Khola flows through this place. Some of the Chowks in Shantinagar are Devithan, Namuna Tole, Bhulke Chowk, Jogi Dagar, Shiva Chowk, Katar Chowk, etc.
