= Jhurkiya =

Jhurkiya झुर्किया
- Village development committee
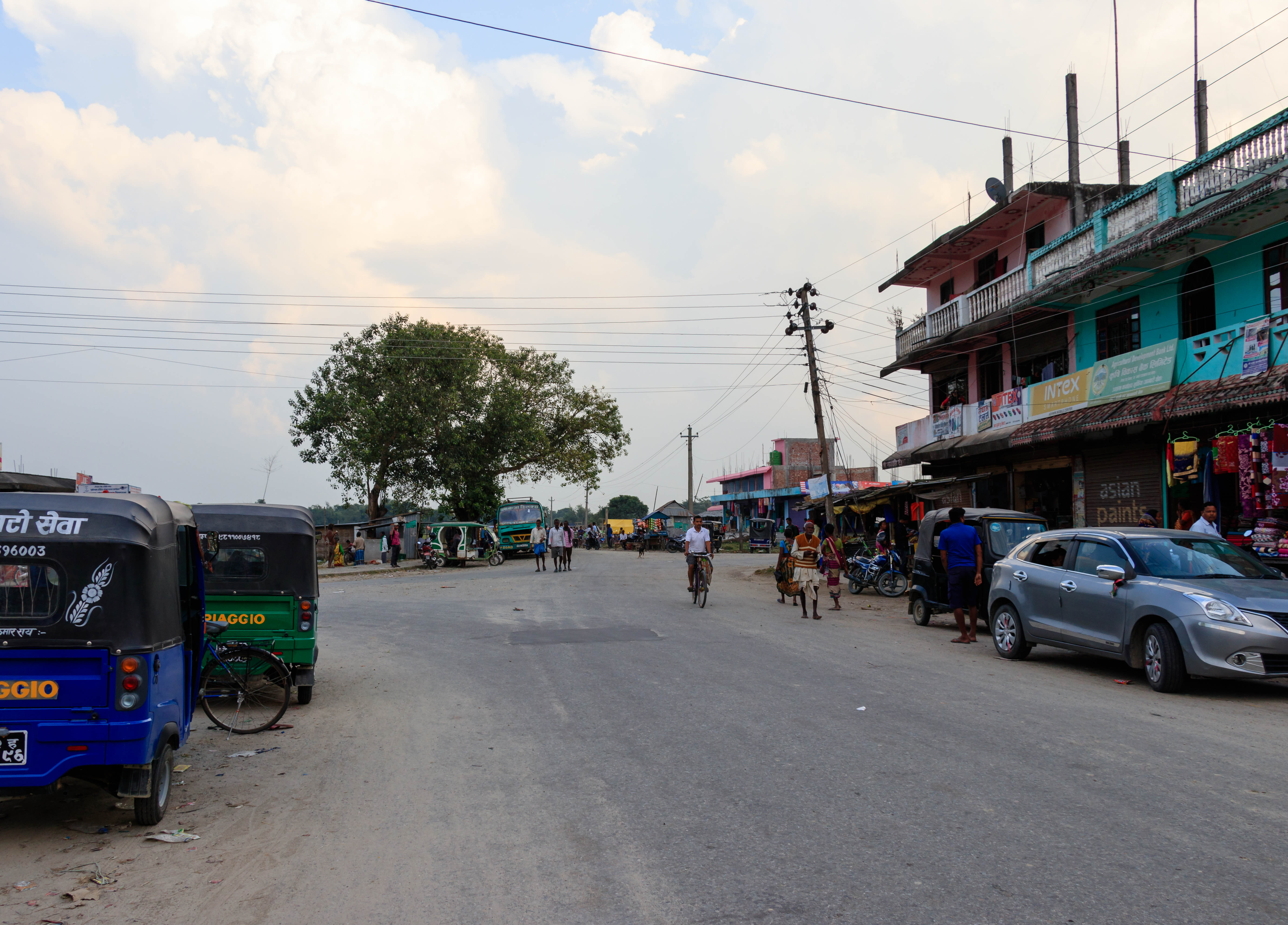
- Aambari Chwok, Jhurkiya, Morang District

- Location in Nepal
- Coordinates: 26.43°N 87.63°E
- Country: Nepal
- Zone: Kosi Zone
- District: Morang District

Population (1991)
  - Total: 8,452
- Time zone: UTC+5:45 (Nepal Time)

Jhurkiya is a village development committee in Morang District in the Kosi Zone of south-eastern Nepal. At the time of the 1991 Nepal census it had a population of 8452 people living in 1974 individual households.

== Gallery ==
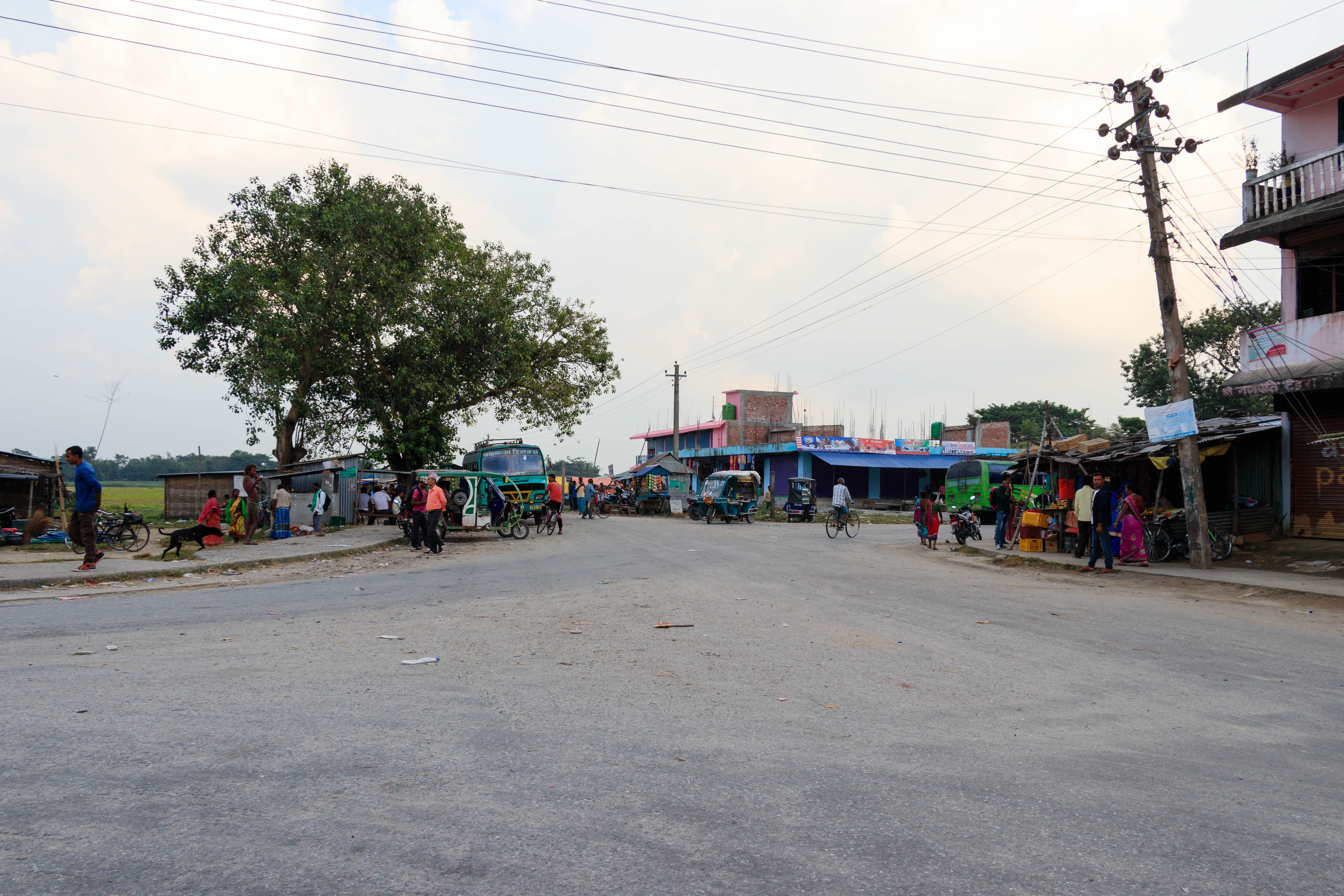

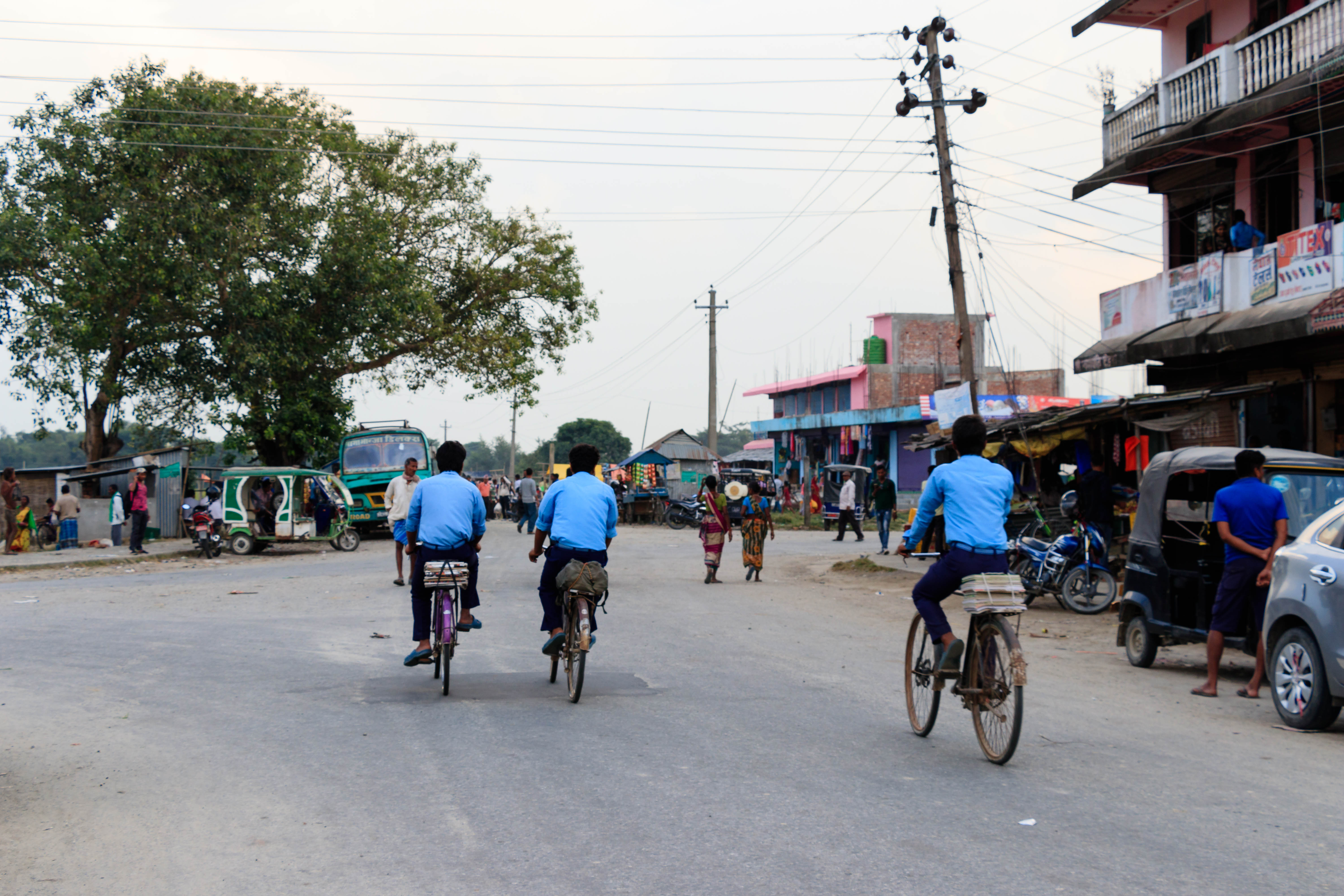

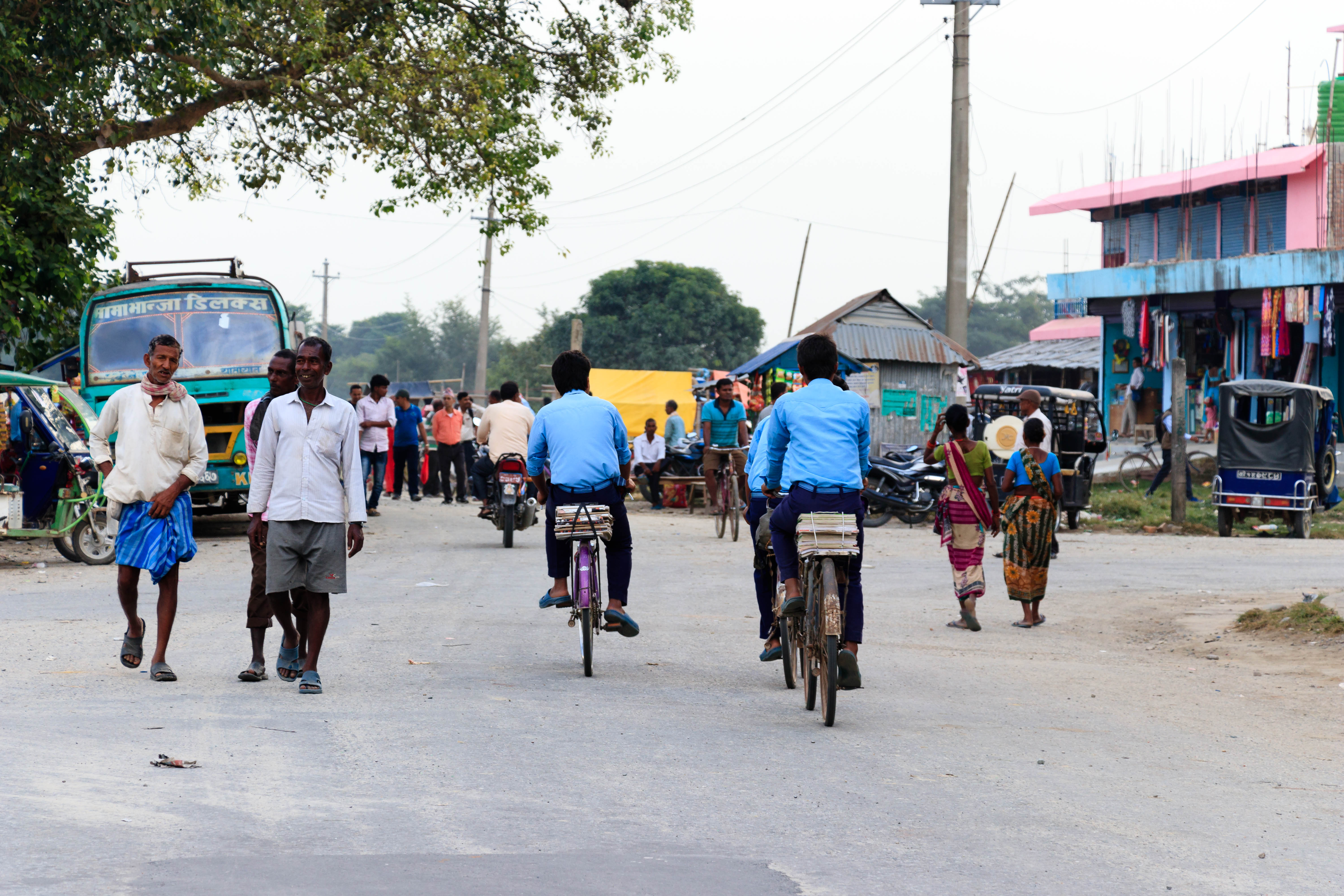

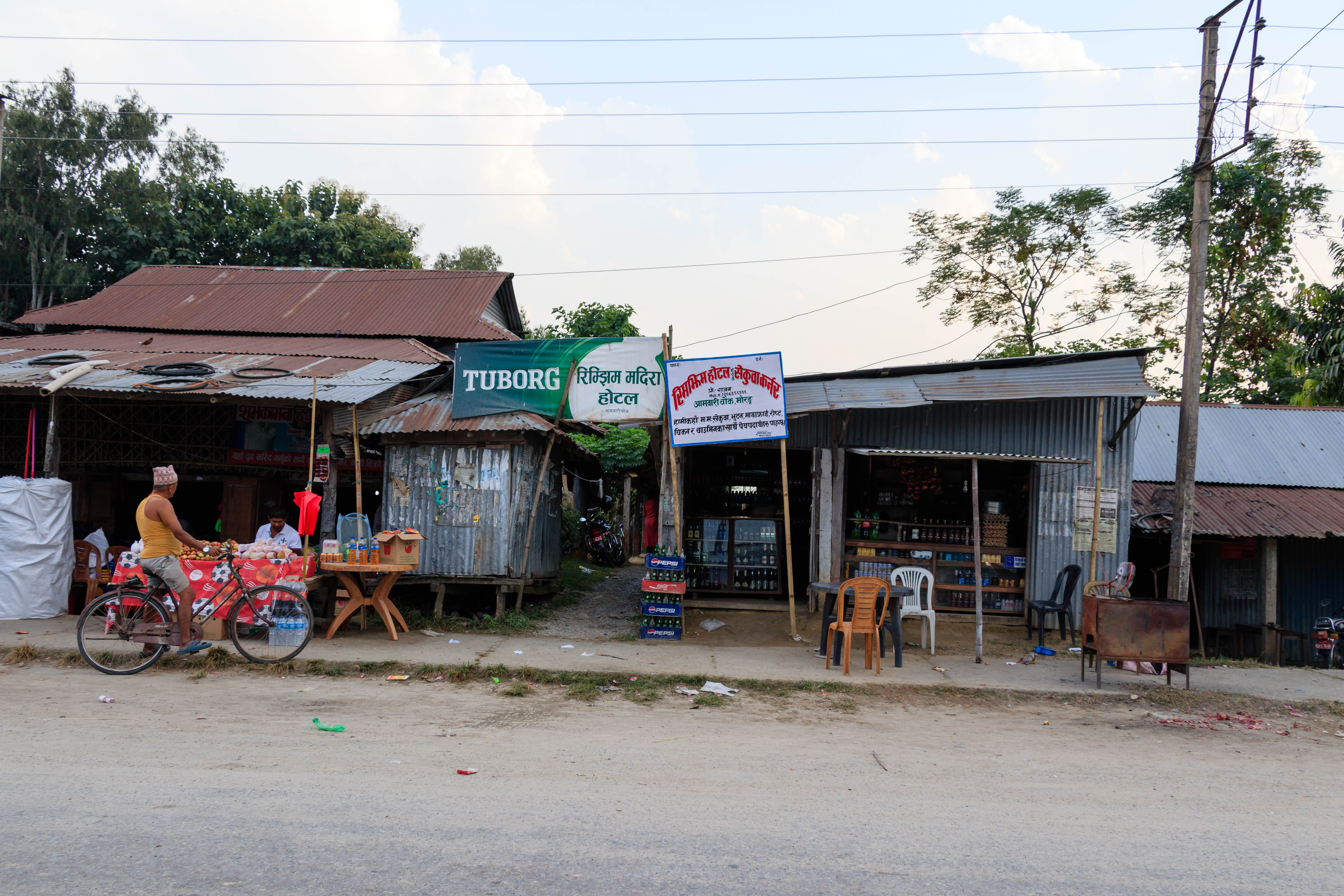
