= Aekamba =

Place in Nepal

Ekamba एकम्बा
- Village development committee
- Location in Nepal
- Coordinates: 26.65°N 87.23°E
- Country: Nepal
- Zone: Kosi Zone
- District: Sunsari District

Population (1991)
  - Total: 7,781
- Time zone: UTC+5:45 (Nepal Time)

Ekamba is a part of Itahari Sub-Metropolitan City in Sunsari District in the Kosi Zone of south-eastern Nepal. At the time of the 1991 Nepal census it had a population of 7781.
