= Thechambu =

Thechambu थेचम्वु
- Village development committee
- Location in Nepal
- Coordinates: 27.31°N 87.75°E
- Country: Nepal
- Province: Province No. 1
- District: Taplejung District

Population (1991)
  - Total: 3,428 Languages = Limbu Nepali
- Time zone: UTC+5:45 (Nepal Time)
- Postal code: 57505
- Area code: 024

Thechambu is a village development committee in the Himalayas of Taplejung District in the Province No. 1 of northeastern Nepal. At the time of the 1991 Nepal census it had a population of 3428 people living in 606 individual households. The main ethnics of Thechambu are Limbus of Menyangbo tribes and clans. Thachambu is known for oranges, lemons, and guava.
