= Babiya Birta =

Babiya Birta बबियाबिर्ता
- Village development committee
- Location in Nepal
- Coordinates: 26.49°N 87.43°E
- Country: Nepal
- Zone: Kosi Zone
- District: Morang District

Population (1991)
  - Total: 12,979
- Time zone: UTC+5:45 (Nepal Time)

Babiya Birta (Nepali: ववियाविर्ता), or Baviyavirta was a village development committee in Morang District in the Kosi Zone of south-eastern Nepal. At the time of the 1991 Nepal census it had a population of 12,979 people living in 2476 individual households.

The VDC is now part of Rangeli municipality, wards 1 and 2.
