= Barai =

Former Village Development Committee in Nepal

Bărăi बर्रे
- Village development committee
- Location in Nepal
- Coordinates: 27.00°N 86.56°E
- Country: Nepal
- Zone: Sagarmatha Zone
- District: Udayapur District

Population (1991)
  - Total: 4,613
- Time zone: UTC+5:45 (Nepal Time)

Bărăi is a village development committee in Udayapur District in the Sagarmatha Zone of south-eastern Nepal. At the time of the 1991 Nepal census it had a population of 4613.
