= Buipa =

Buipa बुइपा
- Village Development Committee
- Location in Nepal
- Coordinates: 27.22°N 86.73°E
- Country: Nepal
- Zone: Sagarmatha Zone
- District: Khotang District

Population (1991)
  - Total: 5,195
- Time zone: UTC+5:45 (Nepal Time)
- Postal code: 56208
- Area code: 036

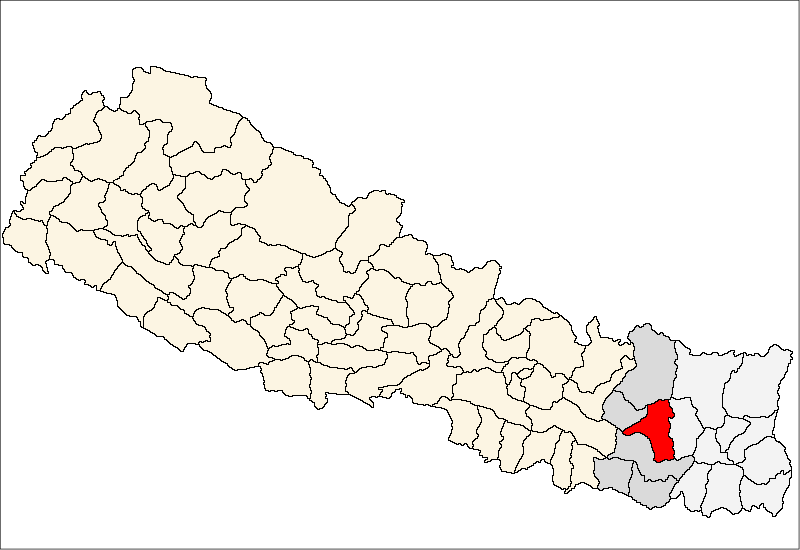

Buipa बुइपा is a village and Village Development Committee in Khotang District in the Sagarmatha Zone of eastern Nepal. At the time of the 1991 Nepal census it had a population of 5,195 persons living in 980 individual households.

== Buipa Chhiptee ==
Buipa, Chhiptee an oldest Rai village of Buipa rural council is situated about 450 miles away from Kathmandu, which is the capital of Nepal. From Kathmandu it takes about 12 hours by bus to get to Gaighat and good four days of walking from there on. Also you can fly to Lamidanda airstrip by small airplane and a day walk into the village. All settlers in Buipa are farmers, where there are 50 houses and around 350 people. Children there grow with an ambition and dream of joining the British Gurkha Army, Gurkha contingent Singapore Police Forces or Indian Gurkha Army. Most of the younger generation leaves the village and only a handful return.

== Sahayogi Primary School ==
Shree Sahayogi primary school was officially established on 1 May 1969 Buipa, Chhiptee. It was originally started under a large Birch tree in the village main path. The first head master of the school was Mr Subha Ser Rai, who was living locally. At the beginning only 10 pupils (male) started to study at the proposed school and local people funded the salary for the teacher. Now the Nepalese government took over, but there are not enough funds available to run the school at a bare minimum standard. Until 1990 female students were not allowed to study in Shree Sahayogi Primary School. It was compulsory that they supported their family in the farm. Now this school runs for up to year five and around seventy students are currently studying. There are only four teachers including two female teacher.
