= Kumarkhod =

Kumarkhod कुमरखोद
- Village development committee
- Location in Nepal
- Coordinates: 26.47°N 87.84°E
- Country: Nepal
- Province: Province No. 1
- District: Jhapa District

Population (1991)
  - Total: 6,415
- Time zone: UTC+5:45 (Nepal Time)

Kumarkhod is a village development committee in Jhapa District in the Province No. 1 of south-eastern Nepal. At the time of the 1991 Nepal census it had a population of 6,415 people living in 1304 individual households.
