= Garamani =

Garamani गरामनी
- Village development committee
- Location in Nepal
- Coordinates: 26.59°N 88.01°E
- Country: Nepal
- Province: Province No. 1
- District: Jhapa District

Population (1991)
  - Total: 15,612
- Time zone: UTC+5:45 (Nepal Time)

Garamani is a village development committee in Jhapa District in the Province No. 1 of south-eastern Nepal. At the time of the 1991 Nepal census it had a population of 15,612 people living in 2755 individual households.
