= Surumakhim =

Surumkhim सुरुम्खिम
- Village development committee
- Location in Nepal
- Coordinates: 27.39°N 87.97°E
- Country: Nepal
- Province: Province No. 1
- District: Taplejung District

Population (1991)
  - Total: 1,737
- Time zone: UTC+5:45 (Nepal Time)

Surumkhim is a village development committee in the Himalayas of Taplejung District in the Province No. 1 of north-eastern Nepal. At the time of the 1991 Nepal census it had a population of 1737 people living in 265 individual households.
