= Oyakjung =

Oyakjung ओयाक्जुङ
- Village development committee
- Location in Nepal
- Coordinates: 27.19°N 87.56°E
- Country: Nepal
- Zone: Kosi Zone
- District: Terhathum District

Population (1991)
  - Total: 4,648
- Time zone: UTC+5:45 (Nepal Time)

Oyakjung is a village development committee in the Himalayas of Terhathum District in the Kosi Zone of eastern Nepal (Purvanchal Nepal). At the time of the 1991 Nepal census it had a population of 4648 people living in 819 individual households.
