= Lekhgau =

Former Village Development Committee in Nepal

Lekhgau लेखगाउ
- Village development committee
- Location in Nepal
- Coordinates: 27.05°N 86.54°E
- Country: Nepal
- Zone: Sagarmatha Zone
- District: Udayapur District

Population (1991)
  - Total: 2,467
- Time zone: UTC+5:45 (Nepal Time)

Lekhgau is a village development committee in Udayapur District in the Sagarmatha Zone of south-eastern Nepal. At the time of the 1991 Nepal census it had a population of 2467 people living in 440 individual households.
