= Sawa, Nepal =

Coordinates: 26°52′N 86°51′E

Sawa सावा
- Village development committee
- Interactive map of Sawa
- Country: Nepal
- Province: Province No. 1
- District: Taplejung District

Population (2011)
  - Total: 2,410
- Time zone: UTC+5:45 (Nepal Time)

Sawa is a village development committee in the Himalayas of Taplejung District in the Province No. 1 of north-eastern Nepal. At the time of the 2011 Nepal census it had a population of 2,410 people living in 501 individual households. There were 1,095 males and 1,315 females at the time of census.

== Media ==
To promote local culture Sawa has one FM radio station Radio Tamor - 102 MHz which is a community radio Station.
