= Malta, Sankhuwasabha =

Malta माल्टा
- Village development committee
- Country: Nepal
- Zone: Kosi Zone
- District: Sankhuwasabha District

Population (1991)
  - Total: 3,870
- Time zone: UTC+5:45 (Nepal Time)

Malta is a village development committee in Sankhuwasabha District in the Kosi Zone of north-eastern Nepal. At the time of the 1991 Nepal census it had a population of 3870 people living in 737 individual households.
