= Vadaure =

Vadaure भदौरे
- Village development committee
- Country: Nepal
- Province: Province No. 1
- District: Okhaldhunga District

Population (1991)
  - Total: 2,498
- Time zone: UTC+5:45 (Nepal Time)

Vadaure is a village development committee in Okhaldhunga District in the Province No. 1 of mid-eastern Nepal. At the time of the 1991 Nepal census it had a population of 2498 living in 451 individual households.
