= Phawakhola =

Phawakhola फावाखोला
- Village development committee
- Location in Nepal
- Coordinates: 27.40°N 87.78°E
- Country: Nepal
- Province: Province No. 1
- District: Taplejung District

Population (2011)
  - Total: 1,303
- Time zone: UTC+5:45 (NST)

Phawakhola is a village development committee that is located in the Himalayas of Taplejung District, in the Province No. 1 of north-eastern Nepal. At the time of the 2011 Nepal census, it had a population of 1,303 people living in 260 individual households.
