= Sikaicha =

Sikaicha सिकैचा
- Village development committee
- Location in Nepal
- Coordinates: 27.38°N 87.80°E
- Country: Nepal
- Province: Province No. 1
- District: Taplejung District

Population (2011)
  - Total: 2,250
- Time zone: UTC+5:45 (Nepal Time)

Sikaicha is a village development committee in the Himalayas of Taplejung District in the Province No. 1 of north-eastern Nepal. At the time of the 2011 Nepal census it had a population of 2,250 people living in 417 individual households, consisting of 1,066 males and 1,184 females.

Sikaicha gbs (golden village [support]) is generally called Golden Village, because of the cardamom (alaichi) that grows there, contributing to the local income.
