= Kaptigaun =

Former Village Development Committee in Nepal

Kaptigaun कप्टीगाउँ
- Village development committee
- Country: Nepal
- Zone: Sagarmatha Zone
- District: Okhaldhunga District

Population (1991)
  - Total: 1,847.
- Time zone: UTC+5:45 (Nepal Time)

Kaptigaun is a village development committee in Okhaldhunga District in the Sagarmatha Zone of mid-eastern Nepal. At the time of the 1991 Nepal census it had a population of 1847.
