= Pedang =

Pedang पेदाङ
- Village development committee
- Location in Nepal
- Coordinates: 27.39°N 87.86°E
- Country: Nepal
- Province: Province No. 1
- District: Taplejung District

Population (2011)
  - Total: 1,701
- Time zone: UTC+5:45 (Nepal Time)
- postal code: 57504
- Area code: 024

Pedang is a village development committee in the Himalayas of Taplejung District in the Province No. 1 of north-eastern Nepal. At the time of the 2011 Nepal census it had a population of 1701 people living in 344 individual household.
