= Mahadeva, Morang =

Mahadewa महादेवा Ratuwamai Nagarpalika-3
- Village development committee
- Country: Nepal
- Zone: Kosi Zone
- District: Morang District

Population (1991)
  - Total: 4,520
- Time zone: UTC+5:45 (Nepal Time)
- Postal code: 56600

Mahadewa is a village development committee in Morang District in the Kosi Zone of southeastern Nepal( Ratuwa Mai Nagarpalika-3). In the 1991 national census, it had a population of 3,713 people living in 780 individual households. Castes living in the area include Gangai (Singh), Rajbansi, Tajpurya, Maghi, and Jha.
