= Majhaura =

Village development committee in Sagarmatha Zone, Nepal

Majhaura मझौरा
- Village development committee
- Location in Nepal
- Coordinates: 26.62°N 86.43°E
- Country: Nepal
- Zone: Sagarmatha Zone
- District: Siraha District

Population (1991)
  - Total: 3,964
- Time zone: UTC+5:45 (Nepal Time)

Majhaura is a village development committee in Siraha District in the Sagarmatha Zone of south-eastern Nepal. At the time of the 1991 Nepal census it had a population of 3964 people living in 678 individual households.
