= Myakhu =

Former Village Development Committee in Nepal

Myakhu मंयखु
- Village development committee
- Country: Nepal
- Zone: Sagarmatha Zone
- District: Udayapur District
- Time zone: UTC+5:45 (Nepal Time)

Myakhu is a village development committee in Udayapur District in the Sagarmatha Zone of south-eastern Nepal.
