= Janti =

Former Village Development Committee in Nepal

Coordinates: 27°04′20″N 86°42′06″E

Jante जाँते
- Village development committee
- Interactive map of Jante
- Country: Nepal
- Zone: Sagarmatha Zone
- District: Udayapur District

Population (1991)
  - Total: 2,142
- Time zone: UTC+5:45 (Nepal Time)

Jante is a village development committee in Udayapur District in the Sagarmatha Zone of south-eastern Nepal. At the time of the 1991 Nepal census it had a population of 2142 people living in 385 individual households.
