= Tellok =

Tellok तेल्लोक
- Village development committee
- Location in Nepal
- Coordinates: 27.38°N 87.83°E
- Country: Nepal
- Province: Province No. 1
- District: Taplejung District

Population (1991)
  - Total: 2,296
- Time zone: UTC+5:45 (Nepal Time)

Tellok is a village development committee in the Himalayas of Taplejung District in the Province No. 1 of north-eastern Nepal. At the time of the 1991 Nepal census it had a population of 2296 people living in 387 individual households.
