= Yayankhu =

Mayankhu मयाँखु
- Village development committee
- Location in Nepal
- Coordinates: 27.11°N 86.36°E
- Country: Nepal
- Zone: Sagarmatha Zone
- District: Udayapur District

Population (1991)
  - Total: 2,575
- Time zone: UTC+5:45 (Nepal Time)

Mayankhu is a village in Katari Municipality of Udayapur District. This was previously a village development committee in Udayapur District in the Sagarmatha Zone of south-eastern Nepal. At the time of the 1991 Nepal census it had a population of 2575.
