= Khokling =

Khokling खोकलिङ
- Village development committee
- Location in Nepal
- Coordinates: 27.40°N 87.65°E
- Country: Nepal
- Province: Province No. 1
- District: Taplejung District

Population 2011
  - Total: 3,376
- Time zone: UTC+5:45 (Nepal Time)
- Postal code: 57507
- Area code: 024

Khokling is a village development committee in the Himalayas of Taplejung District in the Province No. 1 of north-eastern Nepal. At the time of the 2011 Nepal census it had a population of 3,376 people living in 693 individual households. There were 1,614 males and 1,762 females at the time of census.
