= Tikuliya, Saptari =

Tikuliya टिकुलिया suranga nagar pallika
- Village development committee
- Nickname: Gluf city( BY NST )
- Location in Nepal
- Coordinates: 26.64°N 86.52°E
- Country: Nepal
- Zone: Sagarmatha Zone
- District: Saptari District

Population (1991)
  - Total: 2,693
- Time zone: UTC+5:45 (Nepal Time)

Tikuliya is a village development committee in Saptari District in the Sagarmatha Zone of south-eastern Nepal. At the time of the 1991 Nepal census it had a population of 2693 people living in 528 individual households.

Tikuliya is converted from village to city in 2017, and calledsuranga nagar pallika 9.

.The city is inhabited by people of many religions, such as Brahmins, Barbers, Muslims and Brahmins.And besides, there are people of many religions who live very well together. There is no riot.by nst
