= Hanshpokha =

Coordinates: 26°42′N 87°15′E

Hansposa हाँसपोसा
- Village development committee
- Interactive map of Hansposa
- Country: Nepal
- Zone: Kosi Zone
- District: Sunsari District

Population (1991)
  - Total: 11,479
- Time zone: UTC+5:45 (Nepal Time)

Hanshpokha is a village development committee in Sunsari District in the Kosi Zone of south-eastern Nepal. At the time of the 1991 Nepal census it had a population of 11479 people living in 2242 individual households.
