= Jhorahat =

Jhorahat झोराहाट
- Village development committee
- Location in Nepal
- Coordinates: 26°31′08″N 87°19′44″E
- Country: Nepal
- Zone: Kosi Zone
- District: Morang District

Population (2001)
  - Total: 4,844
- Time zone: UTC+5:45 (Nepal Time)
- Postal code: 56615
- Area code: 021

Jhorahat is a village development committee (according to older administrative division of Nepal) in Morang District in the Koshi Zone of south-eastern Nepal. According to the most recent administrative division, Jhorahat is in Gramthan Gaunpalika Ward Number-2 of Province Number 1 of Nepal. In the south, it is bordered to Biratnagar metropolitan city, the second largest city of Nepal. At the time of the 2001 Nepal census it had a population of 4844 people with 2457 male population and 2387 female population.

== Toponymy ==
The name of the village of Jhorahat is formed from jhora, which means "forest", and hat, which means "bazaar". The name is perhaps an indication that the place was settled by cutting down a forest present there hundreds of years ago.

== Economy ==
Farming is the main source of income for people in Jhorahat, and it is an agricultural trade centre, being situated along a secondary road between Biratnagar and the east-west highway. Being only about 5 km from the outskirts of Biratnagar, some residents of the area work as laborers in factories in Biratnagar or some in higher ranks in various firms and government offices. There are some brick kilns in the countryside east of Jhorahat. Large haat or Bazaar is organised every Monday and Friday. This complements a number of much smaller haats held in surrounding villages.

== Education ==
Saraswati Higher Secondary School is the major educational institute for secondary and higher secondary level education at Jhorahat. It is a public high-school. It has been providing educations from pre-primary level to class 12. There are other primary or lower-secondary level public schools located at Batrai and Pidarbani of Jhorahat. Apart from the public schools, there are also several private schools like Sharada Secondary Boarding School, and Janak School, which have been providing primary and secondary level educations at Jhorahat.

== Ethnicity ==
The Brahmin and Chhetri mostly reside at the central area, while other communities such as Tharu, Musahar, Baatar, Kayasth, Kalwar, Teli, Sudi, Koiri, Jhangad, Gangai, Newar, Kami, Damai, Rai, Magar, Dom, Chamar, Halwai, Rajbanshi, Tamang, Musalmans also live at the central area as well as scattered hamlets such as Khuniyakatta, Batrai (Khagariya), and Pidarbani (Pidarboni/Paal-Pidari). Pidarbani in the north is a large village home predominantly to the Tharu community. On the other hand, Khuniyakatta (south) is dominated by Tharu population and Batrai (South-east) by Baatar population.
