= Baradanga =

Baradanga बरडंगा
- Village development committee
- Location in Nepal
- Coordinates: 26.40°N 87.60°E
- Country: Nepal
- Zone: Kosi Zone
- District: Morang District

Population (1991)
  - Total: 7,194
- Time zone: UTC+5:45 (Nepal Time)

Baradanga is a village development committee in Morang District in the Kosi Zone of south-eastern Nepal. At the time of the 1991 Nepal census it had a population of 7194 people living in 1456 individual households.
