= Khamlung =

Khamlung खाम्लुङ
- Village development committee
- Location in Nepal
- Coordinates: 27.39°N 87.63°E
- Country: Nepal
- Province: Province No. 1
- District: Taplejung District

Population 2011
  - Total: 1,517
- Time zone: UTC+5:45 (Nepal Time)

Khamlung is a village development committee in the Himalayas of Taplejung District in the Province No. 1 of north-eastern Nepal. At the time of the 2011 Nepal census it had a population of 1517 people living in 319 individual households. There were 730 males and 787 females at the time of census.

The major famous place of Khamlung VDC are Sagfhara, Dovan, Tamor river, Maiwaa khola.
