= Tandi, Morang =

Tandi टाँडी
- Village development committee
- Location in Nepal
- Coordinates: 26.78°N 87.63°E
- Country: Nepal
- Zone: Kosi Zone
- District: Morang District

Area
  - Total: 51.7 km^{2} (20.0 sq mi)

Population (2015)
  - Total: 8,639
  - Density: 167/km^{2} (433/sq mi)
- Time zone: UTC+5:45 (Nepal Time)

Tandi is a rural municipality in Morang District in the Kosi Zone of south-eastern Nepal. At the time of the 1991 Nepal census it had a population of 7919 people living in 1410 individual households.
