= Dainiya =

Dainiya डाइनिया
- Village development committee
- Location in Nepal
- Coordinates: 26.44°N 87.56°E
- Country: Nepal
- Zone: Kosi Zone
- District: Morang District

Population (1991)
  - Total: 9,551
- Time zone: UTC+5:45 (Nepal Time)

Dainiya is a village development committee in Morang District in the Kosi Zone of south-eastern Nepal. At the time of the 1991 Nepal census it had a population of 9551 people living in 2012 individual households.
