= Patigaun =

Patigaun पाटिगाउ
- Village development committee
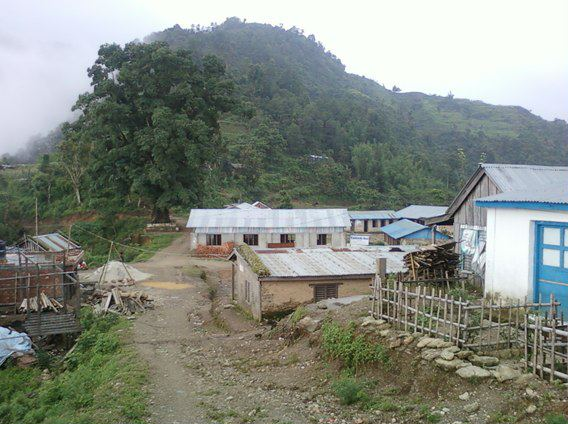
- Patigaun in Morang District

- Location in Nepal
- Coordinates: 26.85°N 87.41°E
- Country: Nepal
- Zone: Kosi Zone
- District: Morang District

Population (1991)
  - Total: 2,104
- Time zone: UTC+5:45 (Nepal Time)

Patigaun is a village development committee in Morang District in the Kosi Zone of south-eastern Nepal. At the time of the 1991 Nepal census it had a population of 2104 people living in 367 individual households.
