= Maheshpur, Jhapa =

Coordinates: 26°31′N 88°5′E

Maheshpur महेशपुर
- Village development committee
- Interactive map of Maheshpur
- Country: Nepal
- Province: Province No. 1
- District: Jhapa District

Population (1991)
  - Total: 49,060
- Time zone: UTC+5:45 (Nepal Time)

Maheshpur is a village development committee in Jhapa District in the Province No. 1 of south-eastern Nepal. At the time of the 1991 Nepal census it had a population of 49,060. It lies about 14 km from Bangladesh.
