= Lingtep =

Lingtep लिङतेप्
- Village development committee
- Location in Nepal
- Coordinates: 27.42°N 87.59°E
- Country: Nepal
- Province: Province No. 1
- District: Taplejung District

Population (2011)
  - Total: 1,616
- Time zone: UTC+5:45 (Nepal Time)

Lingtep is a village development committee in the Himalayas of Taplejung District in the Province No. 1 of north-eastern Nepal. At the time of the 2011 Nepal census it had a population of 1,616 people living in 332 individual households. There were 747 males and 869 females at the time of census.
