= Sinhadevi Sombare =

Coordinates: 26°51′N 87°28′E

Sinhadevi सिंहदेवी
- Village development committee
- Interactive map of Sinhadevi
- Country: Nepal
- Zone: Kosi Zone
- District: Morang District

Population (1991)
  - Total: 2,554
- Time zone: UTC+5:45 (Nepal Time)

Sinhadevi was a village development committee in Morang District in the Kosi Zone of south-eastern Nepal.It lies in the northern part of Morang district. Singhadevi was incorporated with a Kerabari, Yangsila, Patigaun & two wards of Bhogteni VDC and has become Kerabari rural municipality.After becoming the part of kerabari rural municipality whole sighadevi VDC has become ward no-2 of Kerabari rural municipality.At the time of the 1991 Nepal census it had a population of 2554 people living in 477 individual households.
