= Korobari =

Coordinates: 26.4333°N 87.7667°E

Korabari कोराबारी
- Village development committee
- Interactive map of Korabari
- Country: Nepal
- Province: Province No. 1
- District: Jhapa District

Population (1991)
  - Total: 4,600
- Time zone: UTC+5:45 (Nepal Time)

Korabari is a village development committee in the Jhapa District of the Koshi Province of southeastern Nepal. At the time of the 1991 Nepal census, it had a population of 4,600 people living in 891 individual households.
