= Mahabhara =

Mahabhara महाभारा
- Village development committee
- Location in Nepal
- Coordinates: 26.50°N 87.81°E
- Country: Nepal
- Province: Province No. 1
- District: Jhapa District

Population (1991)
  - Total: 6,657
- Time zone: UTC+5:45 (Nepal Time)

Mahabhara is a village development committee in Jhapa District of Province No. 1 in southeastern Nepal. At the 1991 Nepal census, it had a population of 6,657 people living in 1,272 individual households. There were 9 wards in total but now it is a part of Gauriunj rural municipality (gaunpalika).
