= Santhakra =

Santhakra सान्थाक्रा
- Village development committee
- Location in Nepal
- Coordinates: 27.39°N 87.59°E
- Country: Nepal
- Province: Province No. 1
- District: Taplejung District

Population (2011)
  - Total: 2,594
- Time zone: UTC+5:45 (Nepal Time)

Santhakra is a village development committee in the Himalayas of Taplejung District in the Province No. 1 of north-eastern Nepal. At the time of the 2011 Nepal census it had a population of 2,594 people living in 533 individual households. There were 1,178 males and 1,416 females at the time of census.
