= Jhapa Baijanathpur =

Coordinates: 26°30′N 87°19′E

Jhapa Baijanathpur झापा बैजनाथपुर
- Village development committee
- Interactive map of Jhapa Baijanathpur
- Country: Nepal
- Zone: Kosi Zone
- District: Morang District

Population (1991)
  - Total: 3,660
- Time zone: UTC+5:45 (Nepal Time)

Jhapa Baijanathpur is a village development committee in Morang District in the Kosi Zone of south-eastern Nepal. At the time of the 1991 Nepal census it had a population of 3660 people living in 744 individual households.
