= Jaljale =

Village development committee in Kosi Zone, Nepal

Jaljale जलजले
- Village development committee
- Location in Nepal
- Coordinates: 27.15°N 87.57°E
- Country: Nepal
- Zone: Kosi Zone
- District: Terhathum District

Population (1991)
  - Total: 4,106
- Time zone: UTC+5:45 (Nepal Time)

Jaljale is a village development committee in the Himalayas of Terhathum District in the Kosi Zone of eastern Nepal. At the time of the 1991 Nepal census it had a population of 4106 people living in 722 individual households.
