= Banigama =

Banigama बनिगामा
- Village development committee
- Location in Nepal
- Coordinates: 26.59°N 87.38°E
- Country: Nepal
- Zone: Kosi Zone
- District: Morang District

Population (1991)
  - Total: 6,748
- Time zone: UTC+5:45 (Nepal Time)
- Postal code: 56616
- Area code: 021

Banigama is a village development committee in Morang District in the Kosi Zone of south-eastern Nepal. At the time of the 1991 Nepal census it had a population of 6748 people living in 1280 individual households.

== List of educational institutions ==
Higher Secondary Schools:

- Public Higher Secondary School
- Buddha English Boarding School
- Pashupati Higher Secondary School
