= Matigachha =

Bhathigachh भाथिगछ
- Village development committee
- Location in Nepal
- Coordinates: 26.41°N 87.32°E
- Country: Nepal
- Zone: Koshi Zone
- District: Morang District

Population (1991)
  - Total: 11,276
- Time zone: UTC+5:45 (Nepal Time)

Bhathigachh is a village development committee in Morang District in the Koshi Zone of south-eastern Nepal. At the time of the 1991 Nepal census it had a population of 11276. Its geographic coordinates are Latitude (width) 26°26'21.1"N (26.4392000°) and Longitude (length) 87°18'12.5"E (87.3034800°).
