= Khajurgachhi =

Khajurgachhi खजुरगाछी
- Village development committee
- Location in Nepal
- Coordinates: 26.46°N 87.69°E
- Country: Nepal
- Province: Province No. 1
- District: Jhapa District

Population (2001)
  - Total: 7,471
- Time zone: UTC+5:45 (Nepal Time)
- Postal code: 023

Khajurgachhi is a village development committee in Jhapa District in Province No. 1 of southeastern Nepal. At the 2001 Nepal census, it had a population of 7,471 people living in 1,544 individual households.
