= Ramite Khola =

Coordinates: 26°49′N 87°36′E

Ramite Khola रमितेखोला
- Village development committee
- Interactive map of Ramite Khola
- Country: Nepal
- Zone: Kosi Zone
- District: Morang District

Population (1991)
  - Total: 2,645
- Time zone: UTC+5:45 (Nepal Time)

Ramite Khola is a village development committee in Morang District in the Kosi Zone of south-eastern Nepal. At the time of the 1991 Nepal census it had a population of 2645 people living in 452 individual households.
