= Sijuwa =

Sijuwa सिजुवा
- Nickname: Old market (पुरानो बजार)
- Location in Nepal
- Coordinates: 26.48°N 87.63°E
- Country: Nepal
- Zone: Kosi Zone
- District: Morang District

Population (1991)
  - Total: 10,999
- Time zone: UTC+5:45 (Nepal Time)

Sijuwa is a part of Ratuwamai municipality in Morang District in the Kosi Zone of south-eastern Nepal. To the north, it is bordered by Itahara; to the south, Jhurkiya; to the east, Jhapa and to the west, Govindapur.

== Population and demographics ==
At the time of the 1991 Nepal census, it had a population of 10,999 people living in 1971 individual households. Bramhins, Chhetri, Newar, Rai, Satar and Mushar people live here and Rajbanshi and Tajpuriya people occupy a large area of the settlement. The main occupation in this village development committee (VDC) is the agriculture. Most of the people earn money by working in the fields. Cash crops are the main source of income for this area. People also work in government jobs.

== Roads ==
The main road which originates from Urlabari through northwest Hulaki way leads to Biratnagar, which is black-topped.

== Education ==
The high school at Sauntha Bazzar provides education for children and youth.

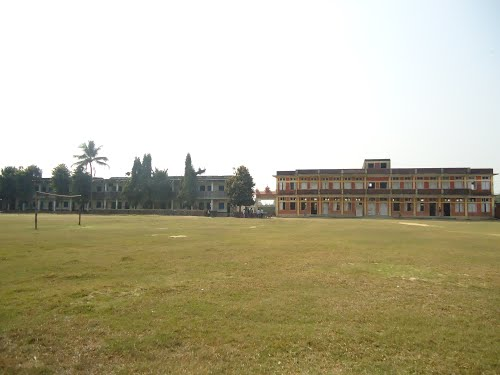
Shree Sauntha higher secondary school
