= Matsya Pokhari =

Coordinates: 27°29′N 87°18′E

Matsya Pokhari मत्स्यपोखरी
- Village development committee
- Interactive map of Matsya Pokhari
- Country: Nepal
- Zone: Kosi Zone
- District: Sankhuwasabha District

Population (1991)
  - Total: 4,058
- Time zone: UTC+5:45 (Nepal Time)

Matsya Pokhari is a village development committee in Sankhuwasabha District in the Kosi Zone of north-eastern Nepal. At the time of the 1991 Nepal census it had a population of 4058 people living in 740 individual households.
