= Yangshila =

Yangshila याङ्गसिला
- Village development committee
- Location in Nepal
- Coordinates: 26.80°N 87.36°E
- Country: Nepal
- Zone: Kosi Zone
- District: Morang District

Population (1991)
  - Total: 5,635
- Time zone: UTC+5:45 (Nepal Time)

Yangshila is a village development committee in Morang District in the Kosi Zone of south-eastern Nepal. At the time of the 1991 Nepal census it had a population of 5635 people living in 964 individual households.
