= Nalbu =

Nalbu नाल्बु
- Village development committee
- Location in Nepal
- Coordinates: 27.51°N 87.53°E
- Country: Nepal
- Province: Province No. 1
- District: Taplejung District

Population (2011)
  - Total: 1,849
- Time zone: UTC+5:45 (Nepal Time)

Nalbu is a village development committee in the Himalayas of Taplejung District in the Province No. 1 of north-eastern Nepal. At the time of the 2011 Nepal census it had a population of 1,849 people living in 376 individual households: 870 males and 979 females.
