= Thalaha =

Thalaha थलाहा
- Village development committee
- Location in Nepal
- Coordinates: 26.51°N 87.38°E
- Country: Nepal
- Zone: Kosi Zone
- District: Morang District

Population (1991)
  - Total: 7,559
- Time zone: UTC+5:45 (Nepal Time)

Thalaha is a village development committee in Morang District in the Kosi Zone of south-eastern Nepal. At the time of the 1991 Nepal census it had a population of 7559.

== Notable people ==
Notable people from Thalaha Kataha include Dr. Ram Ray, an Associate Professor and Researcher, who has made hundreds of publications and has made contributions to knowledge about landslide hazards.
