= Thinglabu =

Thinglabu थिङलावु
- Village development committee
- Location in Nepal
- Coordinates: 27.42°N 87.54°E
- Country: Nepal
- Province: Province No. 1
- District: Taplejung District

Population (1991)
  - Total: 2,744
- Time zone: UTC+5:45 (Nepal Time)

Thinglabu is a village development committee in the Himalayas of Taplejung District in Province No. 1 of north-eastern Nepal. At the time of the 1991 Nepal census it had a population of 2744 people living in 526 individual households. Thinglabu VDC is around 6 km away from Phungling VDC
