= Tetariya =

Tetariya तेतरीया
- Village development committee
- Location in Nepal
- Coordinates: 26.57°N 87.35°E
- Country: Nepal
- Zone: Kosi Zone
- District: Morang District

Population (1991)
  - Total: 4,469
- Time zone: UTC+5:45 (Nepal Time)

Tetariya is a village development committee in Morang District in the Kosi Zone of south-eastern Nepal. At the time of the 1991 Nepal census it had a population of 4469 people living in 846 individual households.

List of Educational Institutions:-

•Shree Devi Madhyamik Vidhyalaya

•Shree Hans Memorial Academy

•Shree Krishna School

Tetariya hat (bazaar) is one of the biggest market of Tetariya. It is held twice in a week on Wednesday and Saturday. There are numbers of shops and hotels.

Religious Places:-

•Shiva Mandir, Tetariya

•Ram Janaki Mandir, Shantipur
