= Motipur, Morang =

Motipur मोतीपुर
- Village development committee
- Location in Nepal
- Coordinates: 26.55°N 87.39°E
- Country: Nepal
- Zone: Kosi Zone
- District: Morang District

Population (1991)
  - Total: 4,611
- Time zone: UTC+5:45 (Nepal Time)

Motipur is a village development committee in Morang District in the Kosi Zone of south-eastern Nepal. According to the 1991 Nepal census, it had a population of 4611 people living in 861 individual households.
