= Budhabare, Dhankuta =

Budhabare
- Village development committee
- Location in Nepal
- Coordinates: 26.87°N 87.54°E
- Country: Nepal
- Zone: Koshi Zone
- District: Dhankuta District

Population (1991)
  - Total: 1,954
- Time zone: UTC+5:45 (Nepal Time)

Budhabare is a village development committee in Dhankuta District in the Koshi Zone of eastern Nepal. At the time of the 1991 Nepal census it had a population of 1954.
