= Itahara =

Itahara, Damrabhitta, Bhaundaha, Dipu इटहरा
- Village Development Committee
- Nicknames: Damrabhitta Bazaar, Bhaundaha chauk
- Location in Nepal
- Coordinates: 26.55°N 87.62°E
- Country: Nepal
- Zone: Koshi Zone
- District: Morang District

Population (1991)
  - Total: 14,931
- Time zone: UTC+5:45 (Nepal Time)
- Area code: 021

Itahara (इटहरा) is a village development committee in Morang District in the Kosi Zone of south-eastern part Nepal. At the time of the 1991 Nepal census it had a population of more than 14,931 people living in 2536 households. Damrabhitta, Laxmichock and Sombare are the most developing places in the Itahara VDC. Damrabhitta, Bhaudaha and Sombare have more educated people in Itahara VDC. In Damrabhitta there is one bank named Miteri Development Bank. It has also two co-operative organizations named Damrabhitta Saving & Credit Co-operative Society Ltd. and Rupantharran Sahakari Sastha. Sombare, Itahara and Bhaudaha are other important marketplaces. Saraswati Uchcha Ma. Vi. and Mahendra Uchcha Ma. Vi. Rastranirman Secondary Boarding School and Annapurna English School, Durga ma. vi., Sayapatri English School, Damravitta Eng. Sco, mount everest academy are the most important learning institutions. Madan Bhandari, a UML leader popularly known as Jananeta, hails from this village. laxmichock, Madan Gram, Satmedi, Jharna, Talibhatta, Thakthake, Dhadra, Jhunabari, Gothedanda and Devisthan are the most important settlements..
