= Lakhantari =

Lakhantari लखन्तरी
- Village development committee
- Location in Nepal
- Coordinates: 26.54°N 87.32°E
- Country: Nepal
- Zone: Kosi Zone
- District: Morang District

Population (1991)
  - Total: 3,320
- Time zone: UTC+5:45 (Nepal Time)

Lakhantari is a village development committee in Morang District in the Kosi Zone of south-eastern Nepal. At the time of the 1991 Nepal census it had a population of 3320 people living in 623 individual households.
