= Amardaha =

Place in Nepal

Amardaha अमरदह
- Village development committee
- Location in Nepal
- Coordinates: 26.53°N 87.55°E
- Country: Nepal
- Zone: Kosi Zone
- District: Morang District

Population (1991)
  - Total: 12,361
- Time zone: UTC+5:45 (Nepal Time)

Amardaha is a village development committee in Morang District in the Kosi Zone of south-eastern Nepal. At the time of the 1991 Nepal census it had a population of 12,361 people living in 2341 individual households.
