= Majhare =

Majhare मझारे Laxminiya Bazzar
- Village development committee
- Location in Nepal
- Coordinates: 26.39°N 87.35°E
- Country: Nepal
- Zone: Kosi Zone
- District: Morang District

Population (1991)
  - Total: 1,356
- Time zone: UTC+5:45 (Nepal Time)

Majhare is a village development committee in Morang District in the Kosi Zone of south-eastern Nepal. At the time of the 1991 Nepal census it had a population of 1356.
