= Kerabari, Morang =

Kerabari, Morang केरावारी
- Village Development Committee
- Location in Nepal
- Coordinates: 26.74°N 87.41°E
- VDC: Nepal
- Zone: Kosi Zone
- District: Morang District

Population (1991)
  - Total: 332,031
- Time zone: UTC+5:45 (Nepal Time)
- Postal code: 56610
- Area code: 021
- Website: www.facebook.com/kerabarinp

Kerabari is a village development committee in Morang District in the Kosi Zone of south-eastern Nepal. At the time of the 1991 Nepal census it had a population of 12,031 people living in 2129 individual households.
