= Pokhariya, Morang =

Pokhariya पोखरीया
- Village development committee
- Location in Nepal
- Coordinates: 26.42°N 87.36°E
- Country: Nepal
- Zone: Kosi Zone
- District: Morang District

Population (1991)
  - Total: 2,078
- Time zone: UTC+5:45 (Nepal Time)

Pokhariya is a village development committee within the Morang District, Koshi Zone, Nepal. At the time of the 1991 Nepal census it had a population of 2078 people living in 376 individual households.
