= Sisawanijahada =

Sisawanijahada शिसवनी जहदा
- Village development committee
- Location in Nepal
- Coordinates: 26.45°N 87.34°E
- Country: Nepal
- Zone: Kosi Zone
- District: Morang District

Population (1991)
  - Total: 7,146
- Time zone: UTC+5:45 (Nepal Time)

Sisawanijahada is a village development committee in Morang District in the Kosi Zone of south-eastern Nepal. At the time of the 1991 Nepal census it had a population of 7146.
