= Siraha 2 =

Parliamentary constituency in Madhesh Province, Nepal

- Parliamentary constituency
- The map of Siraha 2 constituency in Siraha district

- The map of Siraha 2(A) and Siraha 2(B) provincial constituency in Siraha
- Province: Madhesh Province
- District: Siraha District
- Population: 137,445 (2021)
- Electorate: 115,760 (21 November 2025)
- Major settlements: Nawarajpur, Bariyarpatti, Aurahi, Sukhipur, Arnama (Ward 4-5), Dhangadhimai (Ward 3-14), Laxmipur Patari (Ward 1) and Golbazar (Ward 13)

Current constituency
- Created: 1991
- Party: RSP
- Member of Parliament: Shiv Shankar Yadav
- MPA 2(A): Sanjay Kumar Yadav Janamat
- MPA 2(B): Shatrudhan Prasad Singh CPN (UML)

Siraha 2 is one of four parliamentary constituencies of Siraha District in Nepal. This constituency came into existence on the Constituency Delimitation Commission (CDC) report submitted on 31 August 2017.In 2026, Shiv Shankar Yadav of Rastriya Swatantra Party won the parliamentary election from this constituency.

== Incorporated areas ==
Siraha 2 incorporates Nawarajpur Rural Municipality, Bariyarpatti Rural Municipality, Aurahi Rural Municipality, Sukhipur Municipality, wards 4 and 5 of Arnama Rural Municipality, wards 3–14 of Dhangadhimai Municipality, ward 1 of Laxmipur Patari Rural Municipality and ward 13 of Golbazar Municipality.

== Assembly segments ==
It encompasses the following Provincial Assembly of Madhesh Province segment

- Siraha 2(A)
- Siraha 2(B)

== Members of Parliament ==
=== Parliament/Constituent Assembly ===
Election	Member	Party
1991	Nathuni Singh Danuwar	Nepali Congress
1994	Narendra Raj Pokharel	CPN (Unified Marxist-Leninist)
1999	Chitra Lekha Yadav	Nepali Congress
2008	Raj Lal Yadav	Madheshi Janaadhikar Forum, Nepal
May 2011	Raj Lal Yadav	Madheshi Janaadhikar Forum (Republican)
2013	Ram Chandra Yadav	CPN (Unified Marxist-Leninist)
2017	Sures Chandra Das	CPN (Maoist Centre)
May 2018	Sures Chandra Das	Nepal Communist Party
2022	Raj Kishor Yadav	People's Socialist Party, Nepal
2026	Shiv Shankar Yadav	Rastriya Swatantra Party

=== Provincial Assembly ===
==== 2(A) ====
Election	Member	Party
2017	Bijay Kumar Yadav	Federal Socialist Forum, Nepal
May 2019	Bijay Kumar Yadav	Samajbadi Party, Nepal
April 2020	Bijay Kumar Yadav	People's Socialist Party, Nepal
2022	Sanjay Kumar Yadav	Janamat Party

==== 2(B) ====
Election	Member	Party
2017	Madansen Prasad Shreevastav	CPN (Unified Marxist-Leninist)
May 2018	Madansen Prasad Shreevastav	Nepal Communist Party
March 2021	Madansen Prasad Shreevastav	CPN (Unified Marxist–Leninist)
August 2021	Madansen Prasad Shreevastav	CPN (Unified Socialist)
2022	Shatrudhan Prasad Singh	CPN (UML)

== Election results ==
=== Election in the 2020s ===
==== 2026 general election ====
Candidate	Party	Votes	%
Shiv Shankar Yadav	Rastriya Swatantra Party	39,561	56.81
Ram Chandra Yadav	Nepali Congress	12,814	18.40
Navin Kumar Yadav	CPN (UML)	6,713	9.64
Mukti Narayan Singh	Nepali Communist Party	3,680	5.28
Sanjiv Kumar Yadav	People's Socialist Party, Nepal	3,087	4.43
Binod Kumar Yadav	Janamat Party	2,360	3.39
Kapleshwar Yadav	Independent	349	0.50
Ram Kumar Yadav	Nepalka Laagi Nepali Party	211	0.30
Lalit Kumar Singh	Ujyaalo Nepal Party	173	0.25
Others		695	1.00
Total		69,643	100.00
Valid votes		69,643	95.17
Invalid/blank votes		3,532	4.83
Total votes		73,175	100.00
Registered voters/turnout		115,760	63.21
Rastriya Swatantra Party gain			
Source: OnlineKhabar Election Update & Naya Patrika

==== 2022 general election ====
Candidate	Party	Votes	%
Raj Kishor Yadav	People's Socialist Party, Nepal	24,178	35.68
Chitra Lekha Yadav	Nepali Congress	23,028	33.98
Binod Kumar Yadav	Janamat Party	16,902	24.94
Others		3,660	5.40
Total		67,768	100.00
Majority		1,150	
People's Socialist Party, Nepal			

==== 2022 Nepalese provincial elections ====
===== 2(A) =====
Party	Candidate	Votes
Janamat Party	Sanjay Kumar Yadav	12,171
People's Socialist Party, Nepal	Bijay Kumar Yadav	11,527
CPN (Maoist Centre)	Jibachh Kumar Yadav	10,656
Others		941
Result	Janamat Party gain	
Source: Election Commission

===== 2(B) =====
Party	Candidate	Votes
CPN (UML)	Shatrudhan Prasad Singh	13,797
CPN (US)	Madansen Prasad Shreevastav	1,025
Janamat Party	Binod Kumar Chaudhary	6,854
Others		1,926
Result	CPN (UML) gain	
Source: Election Commission

=== Election in the 2010s ===
==== 2017 legislative elections ====
Party	Candidate	Votes
CPN (Maoist Centre)	Sures Chandra Das	20,148
Federal Socialist Forum, Nepal	Shatrudhan Prasad Singh	17,260
Nepali Congress	Ram Chandra Yadav	15,597
CPN (Marxist–Leninist)	Durga Prasad Lamsal	1,777
Others		1,985
Invalid votes		4,768
Result	Congress hold	
Source: Election Commission

==== 2017 Nepalese provincial elections ====
===== 2(A) =====
Party	Candidate	Votes
Federal Socialist Forum, Nepal	Bijay Kumar Yadav	10,383
CPN (Maoist Centre)	Jiwachha Kumar Yadav	9,154
Nepali Congress	Shailendra Kumar Yadav	6,816
CPN (Marxist–Leninist)	Ramsakhi Kumari	1,003
Others		1,031
Invalid votes		2,345
Result	FSFN gain	
Source: Election Commission

===== 2(B) =====
Party	Candidate	Votes
CPN (Unified Marxist–Leninist)	Madansen Prasad Shreevastav	12,521
Nepali Congress	Tapeshwar Mahato Koiri	8,414
Federal Socialist Forum, Nepal	Nirmala Yadav	6,574
Others		1,390
Invalid votes		1,677
Result	CPN (UML) gain	
Source: Election Commission

==== 2013 Constituent Assembly election ====
Party	Candidate	Votes
CPN (Unified Marxist–Leninist)	Ram Chandra Yadav	9,818
Nepali Congress	Surya Narayan Yadav	8,137
Madhesi Jana Adhikar Forum, Nepal (Democratic)	Raj Lal Yadav	5,581
UCPN (Maoist)	Jitendra Kumar Yadav	4,748
Madheshi Janaadhikar Forum, Nepal	Hareram Yadav	2,157
Rastriya Prajatantra Party	Ram Narayan Yadav	1,035
Others		4,891
Result	CPN (UML) gain	
Source: NepalNews

=== Election in the 2000s ===
==== 2008 Constituent Assembly election ====
Party	Candidate	Votes
Madheshi Janaadhikar Forum, Nepal	Raj Lal Yadav	16,684
CPN (Unified Marxist–Leninist)	Ram Chandra Yadav	8,601
Nepali Congress	Chitra Lekha Yadav	7,064
CPN (Maoist)	Bishnu Dev Yadav	3,551
Dalit Janajati Party	Sitaram Harijan	1,792
Terai Madhesh Loktantrik Party	Kedar Nath Yadav	1,608
Others		4,700
Invalid votes		3,333
Result	MJFN gain	
Source: Election Commission

=== Election in the 1990s ===
==== 1999 legislative elections ====
Party	Candidate	Votes
Nepali Congress	Chitra Lekha Yadav	21,029
CPN (Unified Marxist–Leninist)	Hira Bahadur Sunuwar	14,094
Rastriya Prajatantra Party	Chatura Nanda Thakur Danuwar	7,517
Rastriya Prajatantra Party (Chand)	Tarani Prasad Yadav	2,361
Samyukta Janamorcha Nepal	Surendra Prasad Sah Haluwai	1,363
Others		2,860
Invalid Votes		1,318
Result	Congress gain	
Source: Election Commission

==== 1994 legislative elections ====
Party	Candidate	Votes
CPN (Unified Marxist–Leninist)	Narendra Raj Pokharel	12,653
Nepali Congress	Chitra Lekha Yadav	10,207
Nepal Sadbhawana Party	Kedar Nath Yadav	8,852
Rastriya Prajatantra Party	Raj Narayan Yadav	5,357
Independent	Manindra Ranjan	2,235
Others		1,086
Result	CPN (UML) gain	
Source: Election Commission

==== 1991 legislative elections ====
Party	Candidate	Votes
Nepali Congress	Nathuni Singh Danuwar	8,107
Independent		7,500
Result	Congress gain	

== See also ==
- List of parliamentary constituencies of Nepal
