= Golbazar, Siraha =

Municipality in Nepal

Golbazar Municipality गोलबजार नगरपालिका Golbazar
- Municipality
- Location in Nepal
- Coordinates: 26.79°N 86.33°E
- Country: Nepal
- province: Madhesh
- District: Siraha

Government
  - Mayor: Shayam Kumar Shrestha(UML)
  - Deputy Mayor: Manti Devi Sah ([Ja.Sa.Pa])

Population (2011)
  - Total: 47,763
  - Density: 457/km^{2} (1,180/sq mi)
- Time zone: UTC+5:45 (Nepal Time)
- Postal code: 56508
- Area code: 033
- Website: http://golbazarmun.gov.np

Golbazar is a municipality in Siraha District in the Madhesh Province of south-eastern Nepal. Golbazar Municipality was formed by merging former VDCs of Asanpur, Jamadaha, Ashokpur Balkawa, Betauna, Durgapur, Lalpur, Muksar, Chandraudyapur, and Chandralalpur under a new local administrative structure implemented by the Government of Nepal. As per the 2011 Nepal census it had a population of 47763 people living in 2500 individual households.

Golbazar Municipality covers an area of 104.5 km^{2}. There are 13 wards under Golbazar Municipality. The office of Golbazar Municipality lies in Golbazar (Main Market).
