= Khoksi =

Khoksi खोक्सी
- Village
- Location in Nepal
- Coordinates: 26.6226426°N 86.3582424°E
- Country: Nepal
- Province: Province No. 2
- District: Siraha District

Government
  - Ward Commissioner: Bijay Kumar Mahato
- Time zone: UTC+5:45 (Nepal Time)
- Area code: +977 - 033

Khoksi (Nepali: :खोक्सी) is a village within the Bariyarpatti Rural municipality of the Siraha District in Province No. 2 of south-eastern Nepal. It is neighboured by Jankinagar to the east, Sripur from the north, Bariyarpatti to the west and Gargamma to the south. At the time of the 1991 Nepal census it had a population of 2166 people living in 391 individual households. Previously it was under the Village development committee of Jankinagar in the 1991 Nepal census. Now it is part of the Bariyarpatti Rural Municipality. It is divided into four areas (Tolas): Purab Tola (East Area) or (Chouk), Musalman Tola (Muslim Area), Koriyani (West Area), and Baniya Tola (Middle Area). It is a Hindu Muslim and Christian-dominated village. The ward commissioner of Bariyarpatti Rural Municipality from Ward No 2 is Bijay Kumar Mahato who took office from 25 September 2017.
