= Shiv Shankar Yadav =

Nepalese politician

Honourable Shiv Shankar Yadav

Member of Parliament, Pratinidhi Sabha
- Preceded by: Raj Kishor Yadav
- Constituency: Siraha 2

Personal details
- Born: 6 October 1995 (age 31) Sukhipur, Nepal
- Party: Rastriya Swatantra Party
- Parent: Ramprit Yadav (father)
- Occupation: Politician

Shiv Shankar Yadav (Note: Nepali: शिवशंकर यादव) (born 6 October 1995) is a Nepalese politician and currently a member of Pratinidhi Sabha from Rastriya Swatantra Party.

His active participation in Nepalese Gen Z revolution led him to secure a party ticket from the Rastriya Swatantra Party to contest the 2026 general election from the Siraha 2 constituency.

In the 2026 general election, he won from Siraha 2 with 39,561 votes, defeating Ram Chandra Yadav, former Constituent Assembly member and district president of the Nepali Congress.

== Early life and education ==
Yadav was born in Sukhipur, Siraha District on 6 October 1995 in a Maithil Yadav family. Yadav completed a Master's in Political Science, a postgraduate degree from Tribhuvan University.

== Electoral performance ==
| Election | Year | Constituency | Contested for | Political party | Result | Votes | % of votes |
|---|---|---|---|---|---|---|---|
| Nepal general election | 2022 | Siraha 2 | Pratinidhi Sabha member | Hamro Nepali Party | Lost | 699 | 1.03% |
| Nepal general election | 2026 | Siraha 2 | Pratinidhi Sabha member | Rastriya Swatantra Party | Won | 39,561 | 56.81% |
