= Belhi =

Belhi may refer to:

- Belhi, Sarlahi, Janakpur, Nepal
- Belhi, Siraha, Sagarmatha, Nepal
- Belhi, Saptari, Nepal
- Belhi, Madhubani, Bihar, India
