= Fulbariya =

Former Village Development Committee in Nepal

Phulbariya फूलबरिया
- Location in Nepal
- Coordinates: 26.86°N 86.30°E
- Country: Nepal
- Zone: Sagarmatha Zone
- District: Siraha District

Population (1991)
  - Total: 6,710
- Time zone: UTC+5:45 (Nepal Time)

Phulbariya is a town in Mirchaiya Municipality in Siraha District in the Sagarmatha Zone of south-eastern Nepal. The formerly village development committee was merged to form new municipality since 18 May 2014 along with existing Rampur Birta, Malhaniyakhori, Radhopur, Ramnagar Mirchaiya, Phulbariya, Sitapur PraDa and Maheshpur Gamharia Village Development Committees. At the time of the 1991 Nepal census it had a population of 6710 people living in 1273 individual households.
