= Ramaul =

Ramaul रमौल (رمول)
- Village
- Ramaul Traditional Food = Rice, Roti, Meat, Pulao and Biryani
- Location in Nepal
- Coordinates: 26.80°N 86.09°E
- Country: Nepal
- Zone: Sagarmatha Zone
- District: Siraha District

Government
  - Ward 4 Commissioner Ward 5 Commissioner: Mohammad Shamshad Alam Jageshwar yadav

Population (2022)
  - Total: 20,000−25,000
- Time zone: UTC+5:45 (Nepal Time)

Ramaul is a village in Siraha Municipality in Siraha District in the Madhesh Province of south-eastern Nepal. It is surrounded by Makhanaha from the east side, Basbitta from the north-west side, Manpur from the south-west side, Madar from the south-north side and Kamala River from the west side. At the time of the 1991 Nepal census it had a population of 5000 people living in 400 individual households. Before it was under the Village development committee, of Siraha Nepal in 1991 Nepal census. Now it lies under the Siraha Municipality-3,4, and 5. It is divided into five areas (Tolas): Purab Tola (East Area), Uttar Tola (North Area), Paschim Tola (West Area), Dakshin Tola (South-West Area), and Mansoori Tola (South-East Area). It is a Muslim-dominated village with a population of around 20000-25000. The centre of this village is Ramaul chowk and in the centre of it, it has Eidgah where occasional prayers are prayed like Eid-ul-fitr and Eid-ul-Azha (bakreid) and sometime funeral prayers as this eidgah lies in the corner of the graveyard. The second eidgah is on the south side of the graveyard. Ramaul chowk is popularly known for Nepal Avalanche Academy (which is now shifted toward westside) and Ahmadiya Tea Shop. Ahmadiya tea shop is the most crowd gathering spot not just from Ramaul but also from the neighbouring villages. The ward commissioner of Siraha Municipality from Ward No 4 is Mohammad SHAMSHAD ALAM. And the ward commissioner of siraha municipality from ward No.5 is JAGESHWAR YADAV .Both of them took office on 30 May 2022. His predecessor ward commissioner of Siraha Municipality from Ward No 4 was Sheikh Haji Izharul Haque .And From ward No.5 was SULINDRA . Both of them took office on 25 September 2017 and their last date of work was on May 29, 2022.

== Some Information ==
People here speaks dialect which is called as mithila Urdu (which is only spoken by the Muslim in that region) as their mother tongue. The neighbouring villages which have both sects i.e. Hindu and Muslim speak maithali as their mother tongue. This village is more of a town than a village. It has easy access of goods from both side i.e. border and Siraha bazaar.

It has 6 Madrasah, in which Islamic teaching is taught, two private schools, of which one is secondary school and the other is lower secondary school, two government schools. It has 10 Masjid (Mosque). It is 1.6 kilometres (0.99 mi)from Siraha headquarters. The Kamla River, which flows from Nepal to India touches Ramaul from the West Area.

== Educational Institute ==
1. Secondary School, Ramaul, Siraha-04, Nepal
2. Nepal Avalanche Academy, Ramaul, Siraha-05, Nepal
3. Madarasa Arabiya Makhjunool Uloom Assalfiya, Ramaul (East), Siraha-04, Nepal
4. Madarsa Hussainiya, Ramaul (North), Siraha-04, Nepal
5. Madarsa Darrutalim wa tarbiyat, Ramaul (South-West), Siraha-05, Nepal
6. Madarsa Sultanul-uloom Ramaul (West), Siraha-04, Nepal
7. Madarasa Almahadul Ilmi Assalafi, Ramaul (South), Siraha-04, Nepal
8. Al madrasatul Muhammadiyatus salafiyah, Ramaul (South), Siraha-05, Nepal
9. Iqra Educational Academy Ramaul Siraha-04
10. jamia Aaesha Siddiqah (Banat) Ramaul Siraha-04

== Mosque ==
1. Jama Masjid, Ramaul (East), Siraha-04, Nepal
2. Makki Masjid, Ramaul (North), Siraha-04, Nepal
3. Madni Masjid, Ramaul (North), Siraha-04, Nepal
4. Masjid-e-Belal, Ramaul (West), Siraha-04, Nepal
5. Jama Masjid Ahle Hadith, Ramaul (South-East), Siraha-04, Nepal
6. Makki Masjid, Ramaul (South), Siraha-05, Nepal
