= Malhaniyakhori =

Former Village Development Committee in Nepal

Coordinates: 26°50′N 86°13′E

Malhaniyakhori मल्हनियाखोरी Pirari
- Interactive map of Malhaniyakhori
- Country: Nepal
- Zone: Sagarmatha Zone
- District: Siraha District

Population (2011)
  - Total: 3,913
- Time zone: UTC+5:45 (Nepal Time)

Malhaniyakhori is a town in Mirchaiya Municipality in Siraha District in the Sagarmatha Zone of south-eastern Nepal. The formerly village development committee was merged to form a new municipality on 18 May 2014 along with the existing Rampur Birta, Malhaniyakhori, Radhopur, Ramnagar Mirchaiya, Fulbariya, Sitapur PraDa and Maheshpur Gamharia Village Development Committees.

At the time of the 1991 Nepal census it had a population of 3308 people living in 655 individual households.

== History ==
The town had a great personality in its past: Hajari Sah, a landlord who treated everyone with love and politeness. No one in his eyes were small or big; he took everyone as his brothers and sisters. He is still remembered by the old people living in this town.
