= Dhangadhi (disambiguation) =

Dhangadhi is a sub-metropolitan city in Sudurpashchim, Nepal

Dhangadhi may also refer to:

- Dhangadhi Airport, airport in Dhangadhi
- Dhangadhimai, municipality in Siraha district, Nepal
