= Bhokraha =

Bhokraha may refer to:

- Bhokraha, Kosi
- Bhokraha, Sagarmatha
