= Dhangadhimai =

Municipality in Nepal

Dhangadhimai Municipality धनगढीमाई नगरपालिका
- Municipality
- Location in Nepal
- Coordinates: 26.71°N 86.35°E
- Country: Nepal
- Province: Madhesh Province
- District: Siraha District

Government
  - Mayor: Mr.Shivshankar Mahato
  - Deputy Mayor: Mrs.Sangita Kumari Chaudhary

Population (2011)
  - Total: 47,449
- Time zone: UTC+5:45 (Nepal Time)
- Postal code: 56509
- Area code: 033
- Website: dhangadhimaimun.gov.np

Dhangadhimai Municipality is a municipality in Siraha District in Madhesh Province of eastern Nepal. After the government announcement the municipality was established on 19 September 2015 by merging the existing Bhawanipur, Hanuman Nagar, Phulkaha Kati, Dhangadi and Bishnupurkati village development committees (VDCs). The center of the municipality is established in Dhangadhi Bazaar. At the time of the 2011 Nepal census after merging the four VDCs population it had a total population of 47,449 persons. It share the border with Lahan in east and Golbazar in west. After the government decision the number of municipalities has reached 217 in Nepal.
