= Chandrodayapur =

Former Village Development Committee in Nepal

Chandrodayapur चन्द्रोदयपुर
- Village development committee
- Location in Nepal
- Coordinates: 26.84°N 86.32°E
- Country: Nepal
- Zone: Sagarmatha Zone
- District: Siraha District

Population (2011)
  - Total: 5,932
- Time zone: UTC+5:45 (Nepal Time)
- Area code: +977-033
- Website: http://ddcsiraha.gov.np

Chandrodayapur is a village development committee in Siraha District in the Sagarmatha Zone of south-eastern Nepal. At the time of the 2011 Nepal census, it had a population of 5,932 people living in 1,123 individual households.
