= Badharamal =

Former Village Development Committee in Nepal

Badhara Mirchaiya बडहरामिर्चैया
- Village development committee
- Location in Nepal
- Coordinates: 26.85°N 86.16°E
- Country: Nepal
- Zone: Sagarmatha Zone
- District: Siraha District

Population (2011)
  - Total: 16,482
- Time zone: UTC+5:45 (Nepal Time)
- Website: http://ddcsiraha.gov.np

Badhara Mirchaiya is a village development committee in Siraha District in the Sagarmatha Zone of Southeastern Nepal. It contains seven villages. It has 9 Wada.

== Demographics ==
At the time of the 2011 Nepal census, it had a population of 16,482 people living in 3,346 individual households. The village contains Hindus, Muslims, Buddhists and Christians, predominantly Hindu. Local castes include Brahman, Chhetri, Teli, Yadav, Suri, Koiri, Haluwai, Danuwar, Kumal (Mukhiya) Tatama and Musahara people live there.

== Administration ==
Badhara Mirchaiya is included in Karjanha (rural municipality).

== Geography ==
The hills of Chure range are there. It is a mixture of hilly and Terai region. Babataal, Nandmohari, the Kamala River and the Kamala Bridge are local attractions.
