= Salahesh Fulbari =

Historical and cultural garden in Siraha, Nepal

- सलहेश फुलवारी
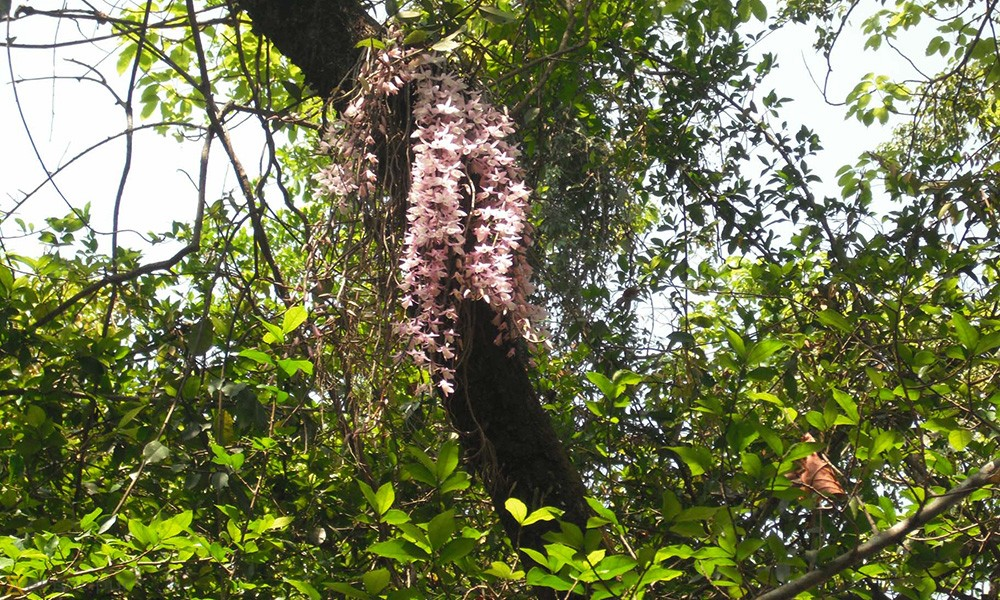
- Dendrobium aphyllum at Salahesh Fulbari

- Location within Nepal
- Type: Municipal
- Location: Lahan Municipality, Siraha District, Province No. 2
- Coordinates: 26°42′52″N 86°26′51″E
- Created: 1880s
- Visitors: unknown
- Status: Opens on first day of Bikram Sambat Calendar

Salahesh Fulbari (Nepali: सलहेश फुलवारी), also known as Fulbari Mela (फुलवारी मेला), is a garden of historical and cultural significance to the south of East West Highway in Lahan Municipality, Siraha District, Madhesh Province, Nepal. In the campus of the garden, there is a Raja Salhesh Mandir. It is famous for an orchid, Dendrobium aphyllum, that is believed to bloom only on the eve and first day of year, Baishakh, the first month of the Bikram Sambat calendar. This funfair is held at 4 km West from the city of Lahan at the area of 14 Acres.

Named after local demigod Salahesh, the garden receives thousands of pilgrims from different parts of Nepal and India each year on the first day of Baishakh. The orchid grown at the tree is taken as a token of love between Salahesh, who is often taken as a folk hero in the Mithila region, and his beloved Malini.

== Mythology ==
The funfair is organized in remembrance of the mythical King Salahesh, for bravery, power, courage, and love. A Hindu god, during 1325 BS, Salahesh always use to visit with his beloved love "Jeeban Bhagat" Princess of Morang and daughter of King Maheswar Bhandari. It is said that Dauna/Deena could not get the love of Salahesh throughout her life so once a year she comes as beautiful flower in this garden to meet Salhesh.
