= Sukhipur =

Sukhipur Municipality सुखीपुर नगरपालिका
- Municipality
- Location in Nepal
- Coordinates: 26.71°N 86.35°E
- Country: Nepal
- Province: Madhesh Province
- District: Siraha District

Government
  - Mayor: Ram Autar Yadav
  - Deputy Mayor: Renu Devi Sah

Population (2011)
  - Total: 20,915
- Time zone: UTC+5:45 (NST)
- Postal code: 56509
- Area code: 033
- Website: http://www.sukhipurmun.gov.np/

Sukhipur is a municipality in Siraha District in the Madhesh Province of south-eastern Nepal. After the government announcement the municipality was established on 19 September 2015 by merging the existing Mohanpur Kamalpur, Vidhyanagar, Kushaha Laksiminiya, Kabilasi, Silorba Pachhawari Balhi and Sukhipur village development committees (VDCs). The center of the municipality is established in Sukhipur Bazaar. At the time of the 2011 Nepal census after merging the seven VDCs population it had a total population of 20,915 persons. After the government decision the number of municipalities has reached 217 in Nepal. Sukhipur municipality is a market which have easy connecting road with India border called Ladanya bazar of Bihar.

== Education ==
1.Janata Secondary School, Sukhipur, Siraha (जनता माध्यमिक विद्यालय, सुखीपुर, सिराहा), It was established as a community based educational institution, which is situated in Sukhipur, Siraha, Nepal. It is affiliated to the National Examination Board (NEB) and approved by the Ministry of Education.

2. Janata Secondary School, Mohanpur, Kamalpur, Siraha (जनता माध्यमिक विद्यालय, मोहनपुर, कमलपुर, सिराहा), It was established in 2008 BS as a community based educational institution, which is situated in Sukhipur-1, Mohanpur Kamalpur, Siraha, Nepal. It is affiliated to the National Examination Board (NEB) and approved by the Ministry of Education. It offers educational programs from ECD to grade 10 and plus two programs.

== Health ==
Sukhipur municipality has Municipal hospital with the capacity of 15 beds and the facility of general lab. New buildings for the hospital are under construction.
