= Madansen Prasad Shreevastav =

Nepalese politician

Honourable Madansen Prasad Shreevastav
- मदनसेन प्रसाद श्रीवास्तव

Province Assembly Member of Madhesh Province
- Incumbent
- Assumed office 2017
- Preceded by: N/A
- Constituency: Siraha 2 (constituency)

Personal details
- Born: June 1, 1959 (age 66)
- Party: CPN (Unified Socialist)
- Occupation: Politician

Madansen Prasad Shreevastav (Nepali: मदनसेन प्रसाद श्रीवास्तव) is a Nepalese politician. He is a member of Provincial Assembly of Madhesh Province from CPN (Unified Socialist). Shreevastav, a resident of Sukhipur, was elected via 2017 Nepalese provincial elections from Siraha 2(B).

== Electoral history ==
=== 2017 Nepalese provincial elections ===
| Party | Candidate | Votes |
|---|---|---|
| CPN (Unified Marxist–Leninist) | Madansen Prasad Shreevastav | 12,521 |
| Nepali Congress | Tapeshwar Mahato Koiri | 8,414 |
| Federal Socialist Forum, Nepal | Nirmala Yadav | 6,574 |
| Others | | 1,390 |
| Invalid votes | | 1,677 |
| Result | CPN (UML) gain | |
Source: Election Commission
