= Sitapur Pra. Da. =

Coordinates: 26°47′N 86°16′E

Sitapur Pra. Da. सितापुर प्र.दा.
- Interactive map of Sitapur Pra. Da.
- Country: Nepal
- Zone: Sagarmatha Zone
- District: Siraha District

Population (1991)
  - Total: 4,671
- Time zone: UTC+5:45 (Nepal Time)

Sitapur Pra. Da. is a town in Mirchaiya Municipality in Siraha District in the Sagarmatha Zone of south-eastern Nepal. The formerly village development committee was merged to form new municipality since 18 May 2014 along with existing Rampur Birta, Malhaniyakhori, Radhopur, Ramnagar Mirchaiya, Fulbariya, Sitapur PraDa and Maheshpur Gamharia Village Development Committees. At the time of the 1991 Nepal census, it had a population of 4,671 people living in 899 individual households.
