= Bijay Kumar Yadav =

Nepalese politician

Honourable Bijay Kumar Yadav
- विजय कुमार यादव
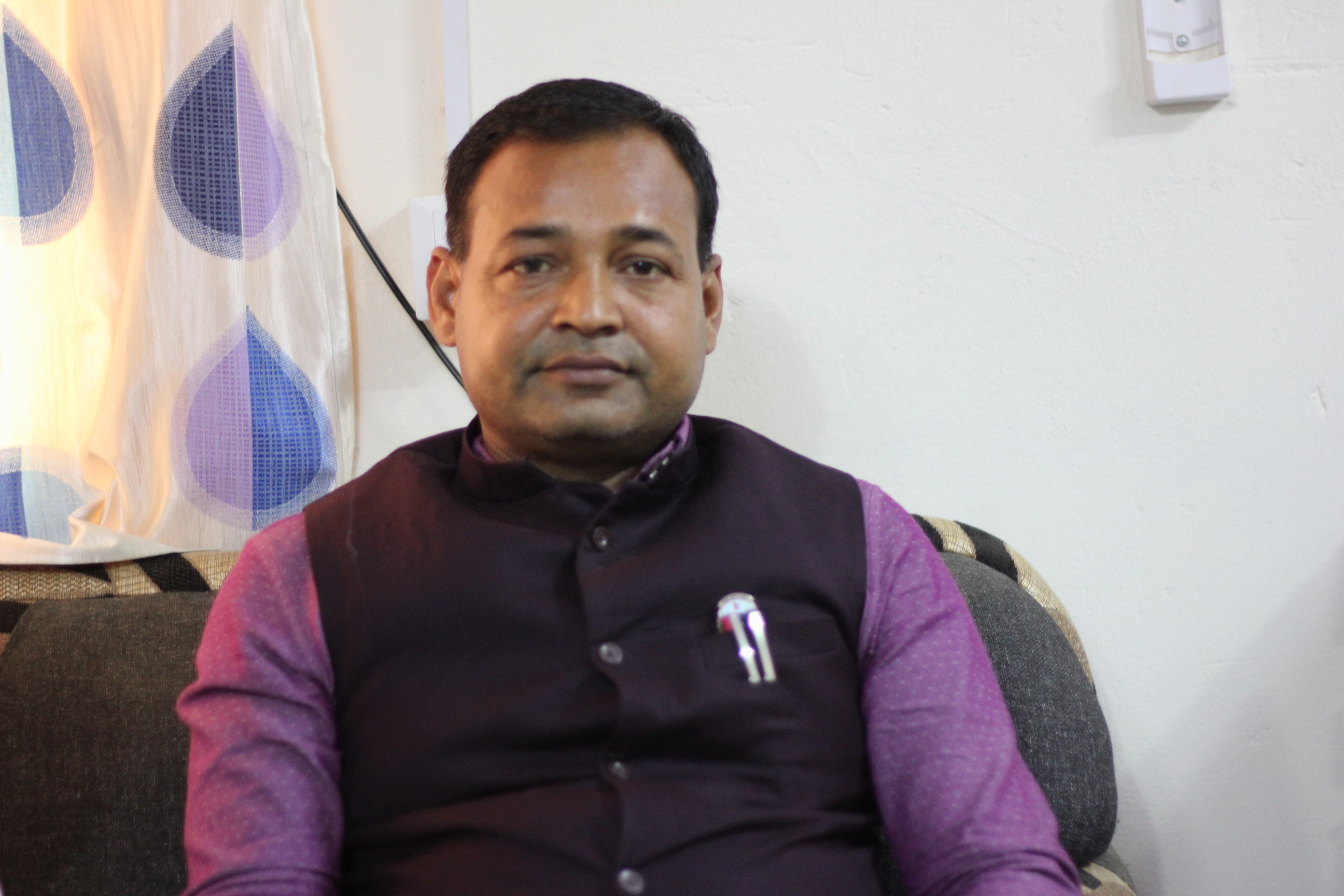
- Portrait of Yadav in 2019

Minister for Land Management, Agriculture and Co-operatives of Madhesh Province
- In office 15 February 2018 – 2022
- Governor: Ratneshwar Lal Kayastha; Tilak Pariyar; Rajesh Jha; Hari Shankar Mishra
- Chief minister: Lalbabu Raut
- Preceded by: Shailendra Prasad Sah

Province Assembly Member of Madhesh Province
- In office 2017–2022
- Preceded by: Assembly Created
- Constituency: Siraha 2 (A)

Personal details
- Party: People's Socialist Party, Nepal
- Occupation: Politician

According to CIAA Spokesperson Rajendra Kumar Paudel, a corruption case has been filed against the accused—including Yadav and other officials—for unlawfully encroaching on Sagarnath Forest Development Project land in Wards 4 and 12 of Bagmati Municipality, Sarlahi. Upon winning his first election, he purchased a house in Imadol. (Source: https://english.nepalnews.com/s/society/corruption-case-filed-against-former-madhesh-minister-yadav-and-seven-others/)

Bijay Kumar Yadav (Nepali: विजय कुमार यादव) is a Nepalese politician and a former member of the Provincial Assembly of Madhesh Province from the People's Socialist Party, Nepal. Yadav, a resident of Aurahi Rural Municipality in Siraha, was elected to the Provincial Assembly in the 2017 election from Siraha 2(A).
