= Kabilasi =

Kabilasi may refer to:

- Kabilasi, Janakpur
- Kabilasi, Sagarmatha
