= Bishnupurkahi =

Former Village Development Committee in Nepal

Bishnupur Katti विष्णुपुर कट्टी
- Village development committee
- Country: Nepal
- Zone: Sagarmatha Zone
- District: Siraha District

Population (1991)
  - Total: 7,532
- Time zone: UTC+5:45 (Nepal Time)

Bishnupur Katti is a village development committee in Siraha District in the Sagarmatha Zone of south-eastern Nepal. At the time of the 1991 Nepal census it had a population of 7532 people living in 1370 individual households.
