= Gauripur =

Gauripur or Gouripur may refer to:

- Gouripur, Bangladesh, a town in Mymensingh Division, Bangladesh
- Gouripur Upazila, an upazila centred on the town
- Gauripur, India, a town in Assam, India
  - Gauripur (Vidhan Sabha constituency)
- Gauripur, Nepal, a village in south-eastern Nepal
