= Govindapur Malahanama =

Former Village Development Committee in Nepal

Coordinates: 26°47′N 86°27′E

Govindapur Malahanama गोविन्दपुर
- Village development committee
- Interactive map of Govindapur Malahanama
- Country: Nepal
- Zone: Sagarmatha Zone
- District: Siraha District

Population (1991)
  - Total: 6,758
- Time zone: UTC+5:45 (Nepal Time)

Govindapur Malahanama is a village development committee in Siraha District in the Sagarmatha Zone of south-eastern Nepal. At the time of the 1991 Nepal census it had a population of 6758.
