= Krishnapur Birta =

Former Village Development Committee in Nepal

Coordinates: 26°40′N 86°17′E

Krishnapur Birta कृष्णपुर बिर्ता
- Village development committee
- Interactive map of Krishnapur Birta
- Country: Nepal
- Zone: Sagarmatha Zone
- District: Siraha District

Population (1991)
  - Total: 3,147
- Time zone: UTC+5:45 (Nepal Time)

Krishnapur Birta is a village development committee in Siraha District in the Sagarmatha Zone of south-eastern Nepal. At the time of the 1991 Nepal census it had a population of 3147 people living in 544 individual households.
