= Sanhaitha =

Sanhaitha Sanhaitha
- Municipality
- Location in Nepal
- Coordinates: 26.63°N 86.25°E
- Country: Nepal
- Zone: Sagarmatha Zone
- District: Siraha District

Government

Population
  - Total: Around 30,000
- Time zone: UTC+5:45 (Nepal Time)

Sanhaitha is no more a Village Development Committee (VDC), it is Municipality-19, Siraha (Nepal) now. Municipality in Siraha District in the Sagarmatha Zone of south-eastern Nepal. As per data available around 30,000 people are living in 4700 individual households in 2078 B.S.
