= Mohanpur Kamalpur =

Former Village Development Committee in Nepal

Mohanpur Kamalpur मोहनपुर कमलपुर
- Village of Sukhipur municipality
- Location in Nepal
- Coordinates: 26.71°N 86.39°E
- Country: Nepal
- Zone: Sagarmatha Zone
- District: Siraha District

Population (1991)
  - Total: 4,065
- Time zone: UTC+5:45 (Nepal Time)

Mohanpur Kamalpur is a village of Sukhipur municipality in Siraha District of Madhesh pradesh of south-eastern Nepal. At the time of the 1991 Nepal census it had a population of 4065 people living in 729 individual households. In the 2021 Nepal census it has the population of 3239 in which 1649 is male and 1590 is female.
