= Padariya Tharutol =

Padariya Tharutol पडरिया थारुटोल
- Village development committee
- Location in Nepal
- Coordinates: 26.73°N 86.46°E
- Country: Nepal
- Zone: Sagarmatha Zone
- District: Siraha District

Population (1991)
  - Total: 4,855
- Time zone: UTC+5:45 (Nepal Time)

Padariya Tharutol is a village development committee in Siraha District in the Sagarmatha Zone of south-eastern Nepal. At the time of the 1991 Nepal census it had a population of 4855 people living in 859 individual households.
