= Pokharbhinda =

Village development committee in Sagarmatha Zone, Nepal

Pokharbhinda पोखरभिण्डा
- Village development committee
- Location in Nepal
- Coordinates: 26.70°N 86.42°E
- Country: Nepal
- Zone: Sagarmatha Zone
- District: Siraha District
- Established: 2014 Dec. 9

Government
  - Secretary: Binod Dhakal (Since 2014 Dec. 9)

Population (1991)
  - Total: 2,962
- Time zone: UTC+5:45 (Nepal Time)

Pokharbhinda is a village development committee in Siraha District in the Sagarmatha Zone of south-eastern Nepal. At the time of the 1991 Nepal census it had a population of 2962 people living in 592 individual households. 97% of Population is Maithil Brahmin here. Languages spoken here are Maithili ( 94%) and Nepali (6%)
