= Naraha Balkawa =

Village development committee in Sagarmatha Zone, Nepal

Naraha Balkawa नरहा बलकवा
- Village development committee
- Location in Nepal
- Coordinates: 26.77°N 86.29°E
- Country: Nepal
- Zone: Sagarmatha Zone
- District: Siraha District

Population (1991)
  - Total: 3,376
- Time zone: UTC+5:45 (Nepal Time)

Naraha Balkawa is a village development committee in Siraha District in the Sagarmatha Zone of south-eastern Nepal. At the time of the 1991 Nepal census it had a population of 3376 people living in 626 individual households.
