= Mahadewa Portaha =

Former Village Development Committee in Nepal

Mahadewa Portaha महादेवा पोर्ताहा
- Village development committee
- Location in Nepal
- Coordinates: 26.65°N 86.47°E
- Country: Nepal
- Zone: Sagarmatha Zone
- District: Siraha District

Population (1991)
  - Total: 3,050
- Time zone: UTC+5:45 (Nepal Time)

Mahadewa Portaha is a village development committee in Siraha District in the Sagarmatha Zone of south-eastern Nepal; the population is 6,977 people.
