= Chatari =

Former Village Development Committee in Nepal

Chatari छतरी
- Village development committee
- Location in Nepal
- Coordinates: 26.73°N 86.20°E
- Country: Nepal
- Zone: Sagarmatha Zone
- District: Siraha District

Population (2011)
  - Total: 2,711
- Time zone: UTC+5:45 (Nepal Time)
- Area code: +977-033
- Website: http://ddcsiraha.gov.np

Chatari is a village development committee in kalyanpur municipality, in Siraha District. This district is located in the Madhesh province of Nepal. At the time of the 2011 Nepal census, it had a population of 2,711 people living in 485 individual households.
