= Mahanaur =

Former Village Development Committee in Nepal

Mahanaur महनौर
- Village development committee
- Location in Nepal
- Coordinates: 26.73°N 86.31°E
- Country: Nepal
- Zone: Sagarmatha Zone
- District: Siraha District

Population (1991)
  - Total: 4,711
- Time zone: UTC+5:45 (Nepal Time)

Mahanaur is a village development committee in Siraha District in the Sagarmatha Zone of south-eastern Nepal. Government hari pal, the time of the 2016 Nepal census it had a population of people living in individual households.
