= Dumari =

Former Village Development Committee in Nepal

Dumari डुमरी
- Village development committee
- Nickname: Ga.bi .s dumari
- Location in Nepal
- Coordinates: 26.79°N 86.24°E
- Country: Nepal
- Zone: Sagarmatha Zone
- District: Siraha District

Population (2017)
  - Total: 6,947
- Time zone: UTC+5:45 (industan)
- Postal code: 843315

Dumari is a village development committee in Siraha District in the Sagarmatha Zone of south-eastern Nepal. At the time of the 1991 Nepal census it had a population of 2,947 people living in 523 individual households.
