= Bishnupur Katti =

Former Village Development Committee in Nepal

Bishnupur Katti बिष्णुपुर कट्टी
- Village development committee
- Location in Nepal
- Coordinates: 26.48°N 86.26°E
- Country: Nepal
- Zone: Sagarmatha Zone
- District: Siraha District

Population (2011)
  - Total: 11,554
- Time zone: UTC+5:45 (Nepal Time)
- Area code: +977-033
- Website: http://ddcsiraha.gov.np

Bishnupur Katti is a Village Development Committee in Siraha District in the Sagarmatha Zone of south-eastern Nepal. At the time of the 2011 Nepal census it had a population of 11554 people residing in 2185 individual households.
