= Inarwa, Siraha =

Former Village Development Committee in Nepal

Coordinates: 26°30′N 86°50′E

Inarwa, Sagarmatha इनर्वा
- Village Development Committee
- Interactive map of Inarwa, Sagarmatha
- Country: Nepal
- Zone: Sagarmatha Zone
- District: Siraha District

Population (1991)
  - Total: 8,045
- Time zone: UTC+5:45 (Nepal Time)

Inarwa, Sagarmatha is a Village Development Committee in Siraha District in the Sagarmatha Zone of south-eastern Nepal. At the time of the 1991 Nepal census it had a population of 8045 people residing in 1451 individual households.
