= Tenuwapati =

Coordinates: 26°39′N 86°21′E

Tenuwapati तेनुवापाटी
- Village development committee
- Interactive map of Tenuwapati
- Country: Nepal
- Zone: Sagarmatha Zone
- District: Siraha District

Population (1991)
  - Total: 3,365
- Time zone: UTC+5:45 (Nepal Time)

Tenuwapati is in Bariyarpatti Gaupalikas or Rural municipalities of Siraha District in the Sagarmatha Zone of south-eastern Nepal. At the time of the 1991 Nepal census it had a population of 3365 people living in 601 individual households.

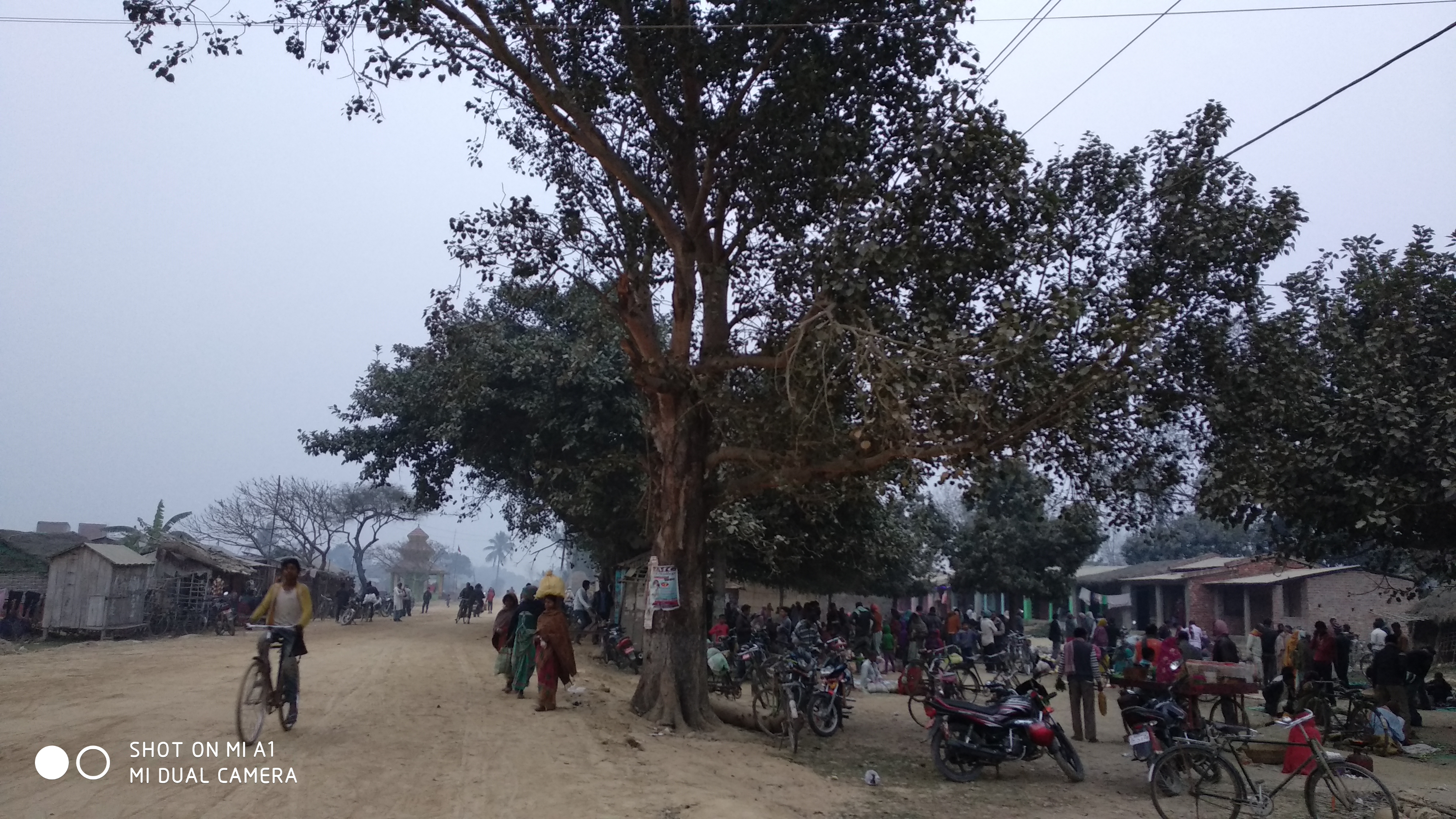
Tenuwaptti Bazar

Organisation Working:

1. Yuwa Dalan: A youth organisation involved in empowering youth and society of tenuwapatti.
