= Mirchaiya =

Mirchaiya Municipality मिर्चैया नगरपालिका
- Municipality
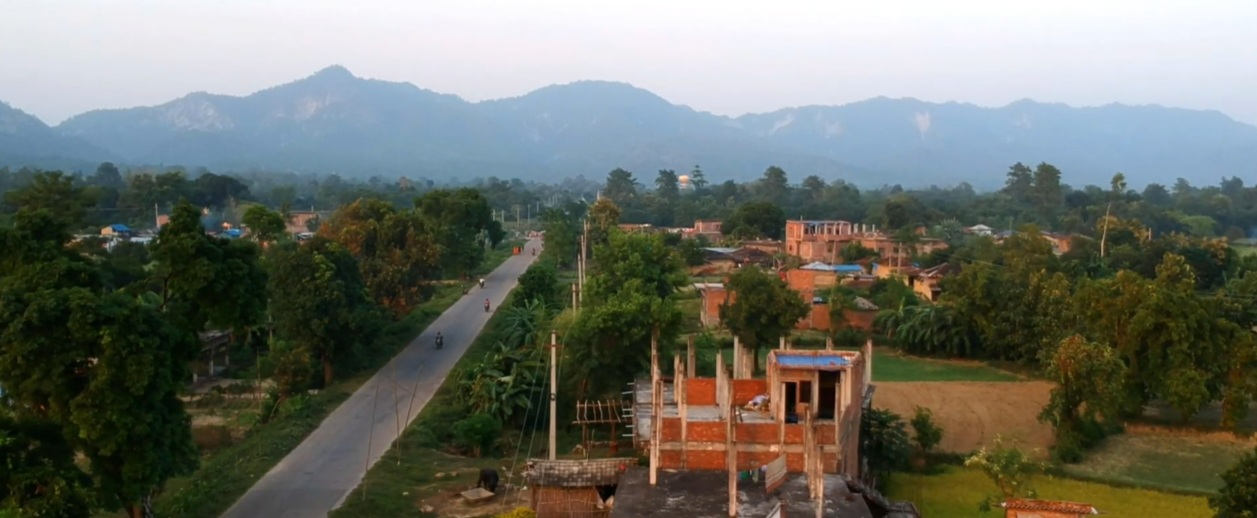
- Nickname: रामनगर मिर्चैया
- Location in Nepal
- Coordinates: 26.84°N 86.25°E
- Country: Nepal
- Province: Madhesh
- District: Siraha

Government
  - Mayor: Shrawan Yadav (NCP)
  - Deputy Mayor: Jivachi Devi Sah (NCP)

Population (2017)24771 Voter (2017)
  - Total: 52,000
- Time zone: UTC+5:45 (NST)
- Postal code: 56515
- Area code: +977-33
- Website: www.mirchaiyamun.gov.np

Mirchaiya formerly known as Ramnagar Mirchaiya is a municipality in Siraha District in the Madhesh Province of south-eastern Nepal. The municipality was established on 18 May 2014 by merging the existing Rampur Birta, Malhaniyakhori, Radhopur, Ramnagar Mirchaiya, Phulbariya, Sitapur PraDa and Maheshpur Gamharia Village Development Committees. At the time of the 2017 municipality records, it had a population of approx. 52,000 people living in approx 8,496 individual households. This is one of the main business markets for Katari and the southern part of the Siraha district. Raw material produced here includes padday, miaze, and sugar cane.

Frequently used language of Mirchaiya is Maithali and always follow their tradition. However, the people of this locality are well educated and can speak English, Nepali, Hindi and some other local languages according to their ethnicity (language carry forward from ancient period). The famous festival of Mirchaiya is Durga Puja (Dashain, Vijaya Dashami), Jhanda Mela, Holi, Chhat puja, Vasant Panchami, Deepawali. The mode of transportation mostly used include: bus, car, bike, bicycle, rickshaw, tempo, and mini bus.

Mirchaiya is considered as a trade and economic center of Sagarmatha zone and some part of Udayapur district after lahan. It was primarily an agrarian economy, but it has evolved as trade and industrial center of the region. Residents of hilly and mountainous regions of Sagarmatha zone are largely dependent on Mirchaiya for their supplies. Mirchaiya is a free wifi zone.

== Educational institutions ==
- Shree Mohan higher secondary school (ESTD. 2003 B.S), (+2 Science, Management, Arts, etc. more)
- Sagarmatha secondary boarding school with(+2 science and management, BBS)
- New Children Secondary English Boarding School
- Times school
- Swastik Pathshala
- Kinder Garten English School
- Axhar pathsala
- Chankya school
- Mithila vidya mandir
- Saraswati boarding school
- White House secondary boarding school
- Devaki college of science and management
- Shree damodrananda college
- SHREE ARUNODAY SIRAHA SECONDARY BOARDING SCHOOL
- Chandra Jyoti school (Nepali medium)
- Sapta rishi school
- Polar star secondary higher English Boarding school
- Himalaya Secondary English Boarding School
- Ram janki school
- Ram Janaki Vidya Mandir
- Unique progress english boarding school
- श्री शारदा माध्यमिक विद्यालय रामपुर विर्ता-६
- Shree Ba.Ju. Ma.Bi. Fulbariya -8

== Transportation ==
Since, this place is totally routed by From Mahendra Highway is directly linked from capital, Kathmandu by Tata Sumo or Hiace (following the KTM-Bardibas road 6–7 hours) | following Chitwan it will take 10–11 hours or by domestic flight to either Janakpur (65 km west of Mirchaiya) or Biratnagar (145 km east of Mirchaiya) and continuation by local bus.

From India by train and road via Jayanagar as entry points to Nepal.
