= Asanpur =

Former Village Development Committee in Nepal

Asanpur असनपुर Golbazar
- Municipality recently announced
- Location in Nepal
- Coordinates: 26.79°N 86.33°E
- Country: Nepal
- Zone: Sagarmatha Zone
- District: Siraha District

Population (2011)
  - Total: 12,926
- Time zone: UTC+5:45 (Nepal Time)
- Postal code: 56508
- Area code: 033

Asanpur is a village development committee in Siraha District in the Sagarmatha Zone of south-eastern Nepal. At the time of the 2011 Nepal census it had a population of 12926 people living in 2510 individual households.

The main bazaar is Golbazar, which contains the entire economic, medical and other facilities available for the VDC. It lies on the side of Mahendra Highway. It is one of the main business areas of the district. Most banks have branches here. There are huge number of establishments of Sahakari Sansthan. Some of the famous temples are Dhaminthan, Shiva Mandir, and Durga Mandir.
