= Bhagawanpur, Siraha =

Former Village Development Committee in Nepal

Coordinates: 26.5100°N 86.7500°E

Bhagawanpur भगवानपुर
- Village Development Committee
- Interactive map of Bhagawanpur
- Country: Nepal
- Zone: Sagarmatha Zone
- District: Siraha District

Population (2011)
  - Total: 2,845
- Time zone: UTC+5:45 (Nepal Time)
- Area code: +977-033
- Website: http://ddcsiraha.gov.np

Bhagawanpur is a Village Development Committee in Siraha District in the Sagarmatha Zone of south-eastern Nepal. At the time of the 1991 Nepal census it had a population of 2845 people residing in 455 individual households.
