= Mauwahi =

Former Village Development Committee in Nepal

Mauwahi मौवाही
- Village development committee
- Location in Nepal
- Coordinates: 26.64°N 86.43°E
- Country: Nepal
- Zone: Sagarmatha Zone
- District: Siraha District

Population (1991)
  - Total: 2,695
- Time zone: UTC+5:45 (Nepal Time)

Mauwahi is a village development committee in Siraha District in the Sagarmatha Zone of south-eastern Nepal. At the time of the 1991 Nepal census it had a population of 2695 people living in 460 individual households.
