= Pipra Pra. Pi =

Coordinates: 26°40′N 86°18′E

Pipra Pra. Pi पिपरा प्र. पि
- Village development committee
- Interactive map of Pipra Pra. Pi
- Country: Nepal
- Zone: Sagarmatha Zone
- District: Siraha District

Population (1991)
  - Total: 5,692
- Time zone: UTC+5:45 (Nepal Time)

Pipra Pra. Pi is a village development committee in Siraha District in the Sagarmatha Zone of south-eastern Nepal. At the time of the 1991 Nepal census it had a population of 5692.
