= Sukhachina =

Village development committee in Sagarmatha Zone, Nepal

Sukhachaina
- Village development committee
- Location in Nepal
- Coordinates: 26.61°N 86.20°E
- Country: Nepal
- Zone: Sagarmatha Zone
- District: Siraha District

Population (1991)
  - Total: 2,380
- Time zone: UTC+5:45 (Nepal Time)

Sukhachaina is a village development committee in Siraha District in the Sagarmatha Zone of south-eastern Nepal. At the time of the 1991 Nepal census it had a population of 2380 people living in 385 individual households.
