= Sikron =

Sikron सिक्रोन
- Village development committee
- Location in Nepal
- Coordinates: 26.81°N 86.19°E
- Country: Nepal
- Zone: Sagarmatha Zone
- District: Siraha District

Population (1991)
  - Total: 2,862
- Time zone: UTC+5:45 (Nepal Time)

Sikron is a village development committee in Siraha District in the Sagarmatha Zone of southeastern Nepal. As of the 1991 Nepal census it had a population of 2,862 people living in 559 individual households.
