= Bhawanpur Kalabanzar =

Former Village Development Committee in Nepal

Bhawanpur Kalabanjar भवानपुर कालाबञ्जर
- Village development committee
- Location in Nepal
- Coordinates: 26.68°N 86.47°E
- Country: Nepal
- Zone: Sagarmatha Zone
- District: Siraha District

Population (2011)
  - Total: 2,769
- Time zone: UTC+5:45 (Nepal Time)
- Area code: +977-033
- Website: http://ddcsiraha.gov.np

Bhawanpur Kalabanjar is a village development committee in Siraha District in the Sagarmatha Zone of south-eastern Nepal. At the time of the 2011 Nepal census it had a population of 3796 people living in 740 individual households.
