= Rajpur, Siraha =

Rajpur, Sagarmatha राजपुर
- Village development committee
- Location in Nepal
- Coordinates: 26.74°N 86.24°E
- Country: Nepal
- Zone: Sagarmatha Zone
- District: Siraha District

Population (1991)
  - Total: 3,902
- Time zone: UTC+5:45 (Nepal Time)

Rajpur is a village development committee in Siraha District in the Sagarmatha Zone of south-eastern Nepal. At the time of the 1991 Nepal census it had a population of 3902 people living in 763 individual households.
