= Chikana =

Former Village Development Committee in Nepal

Chikana Chikana Chikana
- Village
- Nickname: Chikana
- Location in Nepal
- Coordinates: 26.77°N 86.16°E
- Country: Nepal
- Zone: Sagarmatha Zone
- District: Siraha District

Population (2011)
  - Total: 3,270
- Time zone: UTC+5:45 (Nepal Time)
- Area code: +977-033
- Website: http://ddcsiraha.gov.np

Chikana is a village development committee in Siraha District in the Sagarmatha Zone of south-eastern Nepal. At the time of the 1991 Nepal census it had a population of 3640 people living in 723 individual households.
