= Arnama Lalpur =

Arnama Lalpur अर्नामा लालपुर
- Village development committee
- Location in Nepal
- Coordinates: 26.7°N 86.28°E
- Country: Nepal
- Zone: Sagarmatha Zone
- District: Siraha District
- Elevation: 92 m (302 ft)

Population (2011)
  - Total: 9,241
- Time zone: UTC+5:45 (Nepal Time)
- Area code: +977-033
- Website: ddcsiraha.gov.np

Arnama Lalpur is a village development committee in Siraha District in the Sagarmatha Zone of south-eastern Nepal. At the time of the 2011 Nepal census it had a population of 6841 people living in 1255 individual households.
