= Maheshpur Patari =

Village development committee in Sagarmatha Zone, Nepal

Maheshpur Patari महेशपुर पटरी
- Village development committee
- Location in Nepal
- Coordinates: 26.81°N 86.27°E
- Country: Nepal
- Zone: Sagarmatha Zone
- District: Siraha District

Population (2011)
  - Total: 4,396
- Time zone: UTC+5:45 (Nepal Time)
- Postal code: 56505
- Area code: 033
- Website: http://ddcsiraha.gov.np

Maheshpur Patari is a village development committee in Siraha District in the Sagarmatha Zone of south-eastern Nepal. At the time of the 2011 Nepal census it had a population of 4396 people living in 753 individual households.
