= Jighaul =

Former Village Development Committee in Nepal

Jijhaul जिझौल
- Village development committee
- Location in Nepal
- Coordinates: 26.64°N 86.39°E
- Country: Nepal
- Zone: Sagarmatha Zone
- District: Siraha District

Population (1991)
  - Total: 3,719
- Time zone: UTC+5:45 (Nepal Time)

Jijhaul is a village development committee in Siraha District in the Sagarmatha Zone of south-eastern Nepal. In accordance with the 1991 Nepal census it had a population of 3719 people living in 697 individual households.
