= Gautari =

Former Village Development Committee in Nepal

Gautari गौतारी
- Village development committee
- Location in Nepal
- Coordinates: 26.83°N 86.19°E
- Country: Nepal
- Zone: Sagarmatha Zone
- District: Siraha District

Population (1991)
  - Total: 3,110
- Time zone: UTC+5:45 (Nepal Time)

Gautari is a village development committee in Siraha District in the Sagarmatha Zone of south-eastern Nepal. At the time of the 1991 Nepal census it had a population of 3110 people living in 601 individual households.
