= Lakshmipur (Pra. Ma.) =

Former Village Development Committee in Nepal

Coordinates: 26°43′N 86°16′E

Lakshmipur (Pra. Ma.) लक्ष्मीपुर प्र.म.
- Village development committee
- Interactive map of Lakshmipur (Pra. Ma.)
- Country: Nepal
- Zone: Sagarmatha Zone
- District: Siraha District

Population (1991)
  - Total: 2,651
- Time zone: UTC+5:45 (Nepal Time)

Lakshmipur (Pra. Ma.) is a village development committee in Siraha District in the Sagarmatha Zone of south-eastern Nepal. At the time of the 1991 Nepal census it had a population of 2651 people living in 474 individual households.
