= Sothayan =

Coordinates: 26°38′N 86°27′E

Sothayan सोथ्यान
- Village development committee
- Interactive map of Sothayan
- Country: Nepal
- Zone: Sagarmatha Zone
- District: Siraha District

Population (1991)
  - Total: 3,004
- Time zone: UTC+5:45 (Nepal Time)

Sothayan is a village development committee in Siraha District in the Sagarmatha Zone of south-eastern Nepal. At the time of the 1991 Nepal census it had a population of 3004 people living in 539 individual households.
