= Sisawani =

Sisawani सिसवनी
- Village development committee
- Location in Nepal
- Coordinates: 26.71°N 86.44°E
- Country: Nepal
- Zone: Sagarmatha Zone
- District: Siraha District

Population (1991)
  - Total: 3,767
- Time zone: UTC+5:45 (Nepal Time)

Sisawani is a village development committee in Siraha District in the Sagarmatha Zone of south-eastern Nepal. At the time of the 1991 Nepal census it had a population of 3767 people living in 662 individual households.
