= Kalyanpur Jabadi =

Village development committee in Sagarmatha Zone, Nepal

Kalyanpur Jabadi कल्याणपुर जब्दी
- Village development committee
- Nickname: Kalyanpur bazar
- Location in Nepal
- Coordinates: 26.76°N 86.23°E
- Country: Nepal
- Zone: Sagarmatha Zone
- District: Siraha District

Population (1991)
  - Total: 9,326
- Time zone: UTC+5:45 (Nepal Time)
- Post code: 56500

Kalyanpur Jabadi is a village development committee in Siraha District in the Sagarmatha Zone of south-eastern Nepal. At the time of the 1991 Nepal census it had a population of 9326.Now it become one of the metropolitan cities in Nepal.
