= Itari Parsahi =

Former Village Development Committee in Nepal

Itari prasahi ईटारी प्रसाही
- Village development committee
- Location in Nepal
- Coordinates: 26.74°N 86.19°E
- Country: Nepal
- Zone: Sagarmatha Zone
- District: Siraha District

Population (1991)
  - Total: 3,302
- Time zone: UTC+5:45 (Nepal Time)

'Itari prasahi 'which was once a VDC is now a ward no 3 of kalyanpur municipality of siraha district, province no 2, Nepal. It is the heart of the kalyanpur Municipality. It is the most populated ward as well as the largest in area of kalyanpur municipality. Also, It is the richest ward among all 12 ward. Most of the people depend upon agriculture and animal husbandry, fishery for their livelihood. Very few people are business men, teachers, doctors, engineers etc.

== Demographics ==
At the time of the 1991 Nepal census, it had a population of 3302 living in 664 households.

Many mandal's (dhanuka) people live there along with Maithil Brahmin, Mahapatra Brahmin, Muslim, Yadav, Chamar, Dom, Sah, Mahato, pashwan, Mukhiya, Bhandari, Sharma (barhi), Thakur(lauwa), Mandal (khatbe), Mandal (sirot), Chaudhary (Tharu) or Mushar people.

== Culture ==
A temple of Lord Shiva called Parasnath Mahadev was excavated. While digging, villagers found a half constructed building with four five foot tall pillars, a stone ladder, and a philosopher's stone 'paras pathar' (पारस/पारसमणि). Villagers completed the building. After some years, King Birendra bir bikram shah visited the temple. Months after the king's visit, the paras pathar was stolen.

== Economy ==
Agriculture and animal husbandry is the main occupation of this village. Almost one people from every home is currently working in gulf county.

== Geography ==
The village is surrounded by two rivers, ghurmi in the east and kamala in west and south

.[1]
