= Ayodhyanagar =

Former Village Development Committee in Nepal

Ayodhyanagar अयोध्यानगर
- Village development committee
- Location in Nepal
- Coordinates: 26.79°N 86.37°E
- Country: Nepal
- Zone: Sagarmatha Zone
- District: Siraha District

Population (2011)
  - Total: 4,433
- Time zone: UTC+5:45 (Nepal Time)
- Website: http://ddcsiraha.gov.np

Ayodhyanagar is a village development committee in Siraha District in the Sagarmatha Zone of south-eastern Nepal. At the time of the 2011 Nepal census it had a population of 4433 people living in 842 individual households. Some says that it is the place where God Ram was born.
