= Khirauna =

Former Village Development Committee in Nepal

Khirauna खिरौना
- Village development committee
- Location in Nepal
- Coordinates: 26.63°N 86.20°E
- Country: Nepal
- Zone: Sagarmatha Zone
- District: Siraha District

Government

Population (1991)
  - Total: 2,870
- Time zone: UTC+5:45 (Nepal Time)

Khirauna is a village development committee in Siraha District in the Sagarmatha Zone of south-eastern Nepal. In 1991, it had a population of 2870 living in 496 individual households. Different casts of people live in the village, including Goit, Mandal, Thakur and Paswan. The main occupation of people in the village is agriculture.
