= Ashokpur Balkawa =

Former Village Development Committee in Nepal

Ashokpur Balkawa अशोकपुर बल्कवा
- Village development committee
- Location in Nepal
- Coordinates: 26.77°N 86.31°E
- Country: Nepal
- Zone: Sagarmatha Zone
- District: Siraha District

Population (1991)
  - Total: 5,000
- Time zone: UTC+5:45 (Nepal Time)
- Website: http://ddcsiraha.gov.np

Ashokpur Balkawa is a village development committee in Siraha District in the Sagarmatha Zone of south-eastern Nepal. At the time of the 2011 Nepal census it had a population of 5127 and 930 households.
