= Harakatti =

Former Village Development Committee in Nepal

Coordinates: 26°37′N 86°19′E

Harakathi हरकठ्ठी
- Village development committee
- Interactive map of Harakathi
- Country: Nepal
- Zone: Sagarmatha Zone
- District: Siraha District

Population (1991)
  - Total: 2,202
- Time zone: UTC+5:45 (Nepal Time)

Harakathi is a village development committee in Siraha District in the Sagarmatha Zone of south-eastern Nepal. At the time of the 1991 Nepal census it had a population of 2202 people living in 358 individual households.
