= Arnama Rampur =

Former Village Development Committee in Nepal

Arnama Rampur अर्नामा रामपुर
- Village development committee
- Location in Nepal
- Coordinates: 26.44°N 86.13°E
- Country: Nepal
- Zone: Sagarmatha Zone
- District: Siraha District

Population (2011)
  - Total: 9,241
- Time zone: UTC+5:45 (Nepal Time)
- Website: http://ddcsiraha.gov.np

Arnama Rampur is a village development committee in Siraha District in the Sagarmatha Zone of south-eastern Nepal. At the time of the 2011 Nepal census it had a population of 9241 people living in 1731 individual households.
