= Malhaniya Gamharia =

Former Village Development Committee in Nepal

Malhaniya Gamharia मल्हनिया गम्हरिया
- Village development committee
- Location in Nepal
- Coordinates: 26.64°N 86.17°E
- Country: Nepal
- Zone: Sagarmatha Zone
- District: Siraha District

Population (1991)
  - Total: 2,275
- Time zone: UTC+5:45 (Nepal Time)

Malhaniya Gamharia is a village development committee in Siraha District in the Sagarmatha Zone of south-eastern Nepal. At the time of the 1991 Nepal census it had a population of 2275 people living in 404 individual households.
