= Bishnupur Pra. Ma. =

Former Village Development Committee in Nepal

Bishnupur Pra. Ma. विष्णुपुर प्र.मा.
- Village development committee
- Location in Nepal
- Coordinates: 26.44°N 86.15°E
- Country: Nepal
- Zone: Sagarmatha Zone
- District: Siraha District

Population (2011)
  - Total: 5,208
- Time zone: UTC+5:45 (Nepal Time)
- Area code: +977-033
- Website: http://ddcsiraha.gov.np

Bishnupur Pra. Ma. is a village development committee in Siraha District in the Sagarmatha Zone of south-eastern Nepal. At the time of the 2011 Nepal census it had a population of 5208.
