= Pipra Pra. Dha. =

Coordinates: 26°42′N 86°24′E

Pipra Pra. Dha. पिपरा प्र.धा.
- Village development committee
- Interactive map of Pipra Pra. Dha.
- Country: Nepal
- Zone: Sagarmatha Zone
- District: Siraha District

Population (1991)
  - Total: 3,641
- Time zone: UTC+5:45 (Nepal Time)

Pipra Pra. Dha. is a village development committee in Siraha District in the Sagarmatha Zone of south-eastern Nepal. At the time of the 1991 Nepal census it had a population of 3641.
