= Sitapur Pra. Ra. =

Coordinates: 26°39′N 86°25′E

Sitapur Pra. Dha. सितापुर प्र. ध.
- Village development committee
- Interactive map of Sitapur Pra. Dha.
- Country: Nepal
- Zone: Sagarmatha Zone
- District: Siraha District

Population (1991)
  - Total: 3,702
- Time zone: UTC+5:45 (Nepal Time)

Sitapur Pra. Dha. is a village development committee in Siraha District in the Sagarmatha Zone of south-eastern Nepal. At the time of the 1991 Nepal census it had a population of 3702 people living in 693 individual households.
