= Thalaha Kataha =

Thalaha Kataha थलाहा कटाहा
- Village development committee
- Location in Nepal
- Coordinates: 26.72°N 86.23°E
- Country: Nepal
- Zone: Sagarmatha Zone
- District: Siraha District

Population (1991)
  - Total: 4,224
- Time zone: UTC+5:45 (Nepal Time)

Thalaha Kataha is a village development committee in Siraha District in the Sagarmatha Zone of south-eastern Nepal. At the time of the 1991 Nepal census it had a population of 4224.

== Notable people ==
Notable people from Thalaha Kataha include Dr. Ram Ray, an Associate Professor and Researcher, who has made hundreds of publications and has made contributions to knowledge about landslide hazards.
