= Barchhawa =

Former Village Development Committee in Nepal

Barchhawa बर्छवा
- Village development committee
- Location in Nepal
- Coordinates: 26.77°N 86.26°E
- Country: Nepal
- Zone: Sagarmatha Zone
- District: Siraha District

Population (2011)
  - Total: 3,701
- Time zone: UTC+5:45 (Nepal Time)
- Website: http://ddcsiraha.gov.np

Barchhawa is a village development committee in Siraha District in the Sagarmatha Zone of south-eastern Nepal. At the time of the 2011 Nepal census it had a population of 3701 people living in 737 individual households.
