= Kachanari =

Village Development Committee in Nepal

Kachanari कचनारी
- Village development committee
- Location in Nepal
- Coordinates: 26.61°N 86.38°E
- Country: Nepal
- Zone: Sagarmatha Zone
- District: Siraha District

Population (1991)
  - Total: 4,268
- Time zone: UTC+5:45 (Nepal Time)

Kachanari is a Village Development Committee in Siraha District in the Sagarmatha Zone of south-eastern Nepal. At the time of the 1991 Nepal census, it had a population of 4268 people living in 785 households.
