= Hakpara =

Former Village Development Committee in Nepal

Hakpara हर्कपाडा
- Village development committee
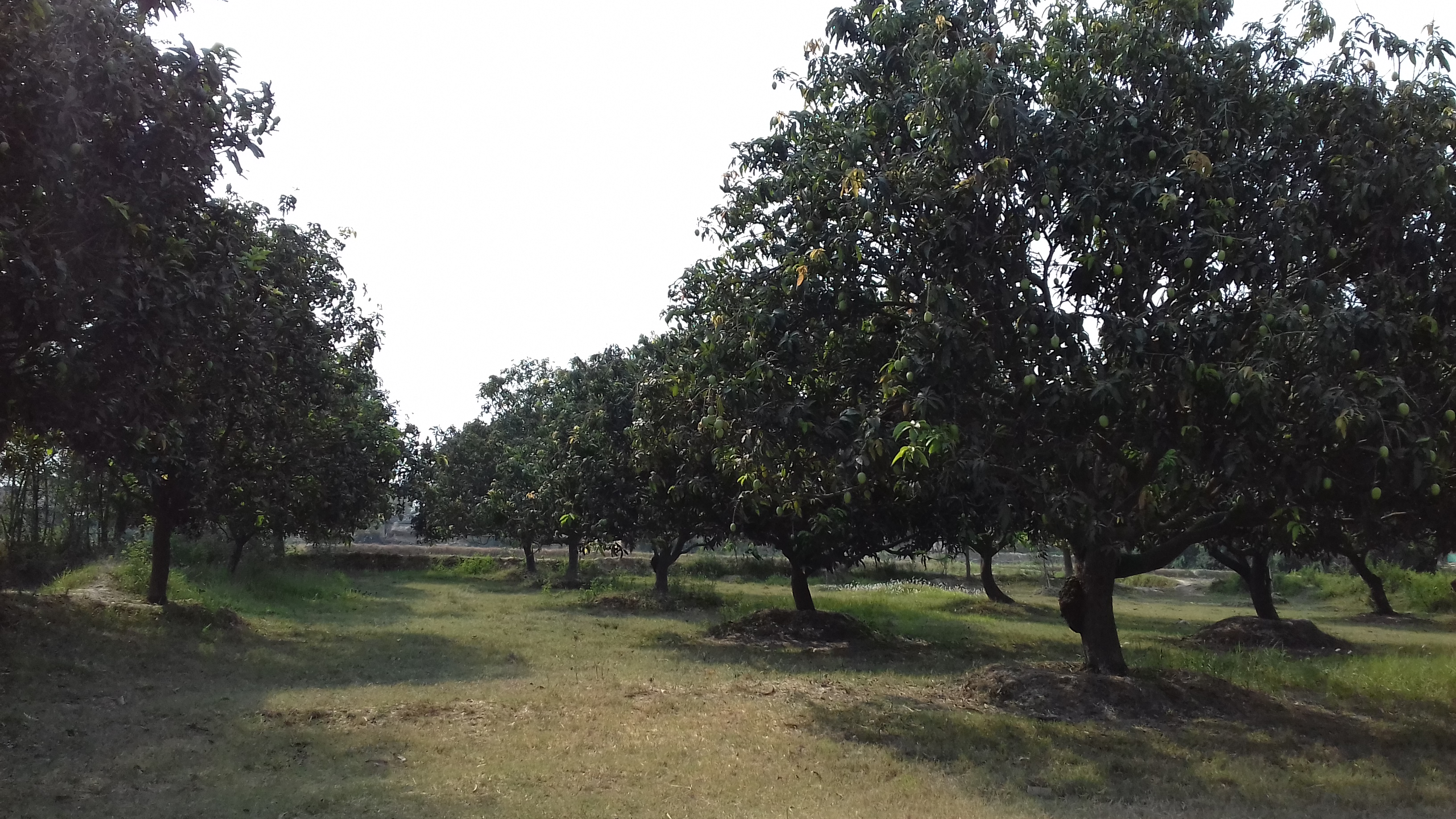
- Large fields of mango trees in Hakpara, Siraha Nepal

- Location in Nepal
- Coordinates: 26.66°N 86.25°E
- Country: Nepal
- Zone: Sagarmatha Zone
- District: Siraha District

Population (1991)
  - Total: 3,395
- Time zone: UTC+5:45 (Nepal Time)

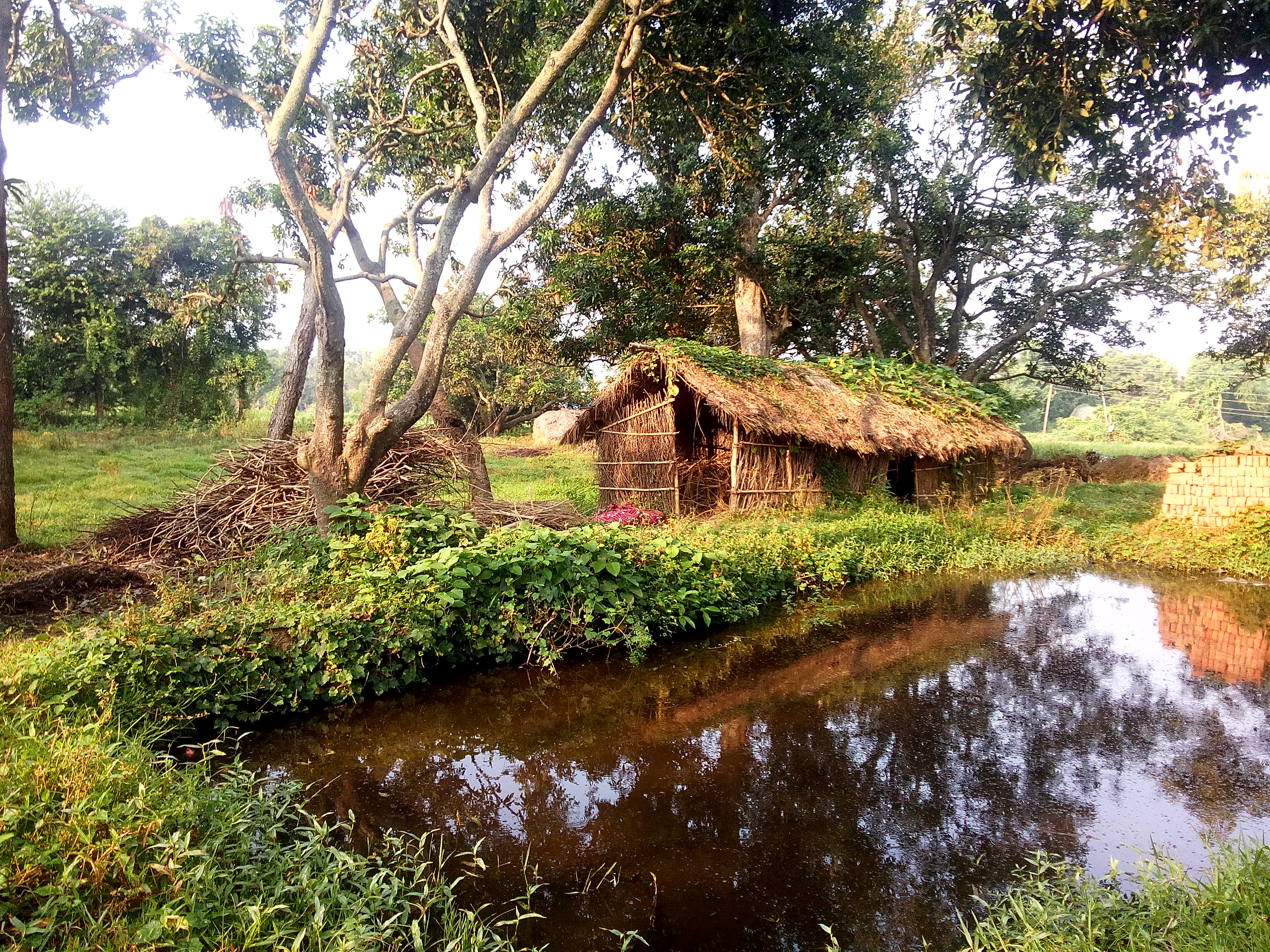
A small cottage near by a pond in Eastern Nepal located at Hakpara, Siraha, Nepal

Hakpara lies in Siraha municipality-22 in Siraha District in the Sagarmatha Zone of south-eastern Nepal. According to the 1991 Nepal census, it had a population of 3395 people living in 595 individual households.
