= Lalpur, Siraha =

Former Village Development Committee in Nepal

Coordinates: 26°48′N 86°21′E

Lalpur, Nepal लालपुर
- Village Development Committee
- Interactive map of Lalpur, Nepal
- Country: Nepal
- Zone: Sagarmatha Zone
- District: Siraha District

Population (1991)
  - Total: 3,412
- Time zone: UTC+5:45 (Nepal Time)

Lalpur, Nepal is a Village Development Committee in Siraha District in the Sagarmatha Zone of south-eastern Nepal. At the time of the 1991 Nepal census it had a population of 3412 people residing in 621 individual households.
