= Bhawanipur, Siraha =

Former Village Development Committee in Nepal

Bhawanipur, Sagarmatha भवानीपुर
- Village development committee
- Location in Nepal
- Coordinates: 26.72°N 86.41°E
- Country: Nepal
- Zone: Sagarmatha Zone
- District: Siraha District

Population (2011)
  - Total: 5,497
- Time zone: UTC+5:45 (Nepal Time)

Bhawanipur is a village development committee in Siraha District in the Sagarmatha Zone of south-eastern Nepal. At the time of the 2011 Nepal census it had a population of 5,497 people living in 1,092 individual households.
