= Silorba Pachhawari =

Silorba Pachhawari(ladkanha sukhipur 5) सिलोर्बा पछावरी
- Village development committee
- Location in Nepal
- Coordinates: 26.69°N 86.32°E
- Country: Nepal
- Zone: Sagarmatha Zone
- District: Siraha District

Population (1991)
  - Total: 4,236
- Time zone: UTC+5:45 (Nepal Time)

Silorba Pachhawari is a village development committee in Siraha District in the Sagarmatha Zone of south-eastern Nepal. At the time of the 1991 Nepal census it had a population of 4236 people living in 748 individual households.
