= Gauripur, Nepal =

Former Village Development Committee in Nepal

Gauripur, Nepal गौरीपुर
- Village development committee
- Location in Nepal
- Coordinates: 26.69°N 86.30°E
- Country: Nepal
- Zone: Sagarmatha Zone
- District: Siraha District

Population (1991)
  - Total: 2,315
- Time zone: UTC+5:45 (Nepal Time)

Gauripur, Nepal is a village development committee in Siraha District in the Sagarmatha Zone of south-eastern Nepal. At the time of the 1991 Nepal census it had a population of 2315 people living in 354 individual households.
