= Madar, Nepal =

Village development committee in Sagarmatha Zone, Nepal

Madar, Nepal माडर Chandrajung, Bazar
- Village development committee
- Location in Nepal
- Coordinates: 26.62°N 86.17°E
- Country: Nepal
- Zone: Sagarmatha Zone
- District: Siraha District

Population (1991)
  - Total: 7,247
- Time zone: UTC+5:45 (Nepal Time)

Madar, Nepal is a village development committee in Siraha District in the Sagarmatha Zone of south-eastern Nepal. At the time of the 1991 Nepal census it had a population of 7247 people living in 1203 individual households, with the local Maithali language. Had one health post with minimum facility. Temples are Shree Mata Durga Bhagabati, Shree Mmata Kali, the oldest one shree ramjanki temple. This VDC is situated beside borderline of India.
