= Belhi, Madhubani =

Village in Bihar, India

Belhi
- Village
- Location within Bihar Location within India
- Coordinates: 26°17′33″N 86°32′51″E
- Country: India
- State: Bihar
- District: Madhubani
- Block: Jainagar

Government
  - Type: Sarpanch

Area
  - Total: 22.75 km^{2} (8.78 sq mi)
- Elevation: 71 m (233 ft)

Population (2011)
  - Total: 32,293
  - Density: 1,419/km^{2} (3,676/sq mi)

Languages
  - Common: Maithili, Hindi
- Time zone: UTC+5:30 (IST)
- PIN: 847226
- STD code: 06276
- Vehicle registration: BR-32

Belhi is a village situated in the Madhubani district, Bihar, India. It is located to the east of Madhubani, close to the border with Nepal. The population of the village was 32,293 in 2011.

== Geography ==
Belhi is located in the western bank of the Kosi River, covering an area of 2274.7 hectares. It has an elevation of 71 metres above the sea level.

== Demographics ==
As of the 2011 census, Belhi had a population of 32,293, of which 17,109 were male and 15,184 were female. The working population comprised 37.07% of the total population. The total literacy rate was 43.63%, with 9,216 of the male population and 4,872 of the female population being literate.
