= Makhanaha, Siraha =

Former Village Development Committee in Nepal

Makhanaha, Sagarmatha मखनाहा
- Village development committee
- Location in Nepal
- Coordinates: 26.80°N 86.09°E
- Country: Nepal
- Zone: Sagarmatha Zone
- District: Siraha District

Population (1991)
  - Total: 2,524
- Time zone: UTC+5:45 (Nepal Time)

Makhanaha is a village development committee in Siraha District in the Sagarmatha Zone of south-eastern Nepal. At the time of the 1991 Nepal census it had a population of 2524 people living in 436 individual households.
