= Arnama Rural Municipality =

Arnama अर्नमा
- Rural Municipality
- Location in Nepal
- Coordinates: 26.73°N 86.20°E
- Country: Nepal
- Province: Province No. 2
- District: Siraha District
- Established: 2073

Government
  - Chariperson: Thaku Mahato Koiri
  - Vice-Chariperson: Siyawati Mukhiya

Area
  - Total: 37.76 km^{2} (14.58 sq mi)

Population (2011)
  - Total: 22,912
  - Density: 606.8/km^{2} (1,572/sq mi)
- Time zone: UTC+5:45 (Nepal Time)
- Postal code: 56500
- Area code: 033
- Website: http://www.anarmamun.gov.np/

Arnama is a rural municipality in Siraha District in Province No. 2 of south-eastern Nepal. At the time of the 2011 Nepal census it had a population of 22,912.
