= Hanumannagar, Siraha =

Former Village Development Committee in Nepal

Coordinates: 26°40′N 86°14′E

Hanuman Nagar हनुमाननगर
- Village development committee
- Interactive map of Hanuman Nagar
- Country: Nepal
- Zone: Sagarmatha Zone
- District: Siraha District

Population (1991)
  - Total: 4,892
- Time zone: UTC+5:45 (Nepal Time)

Hanuman Nagar is a village development committee in Siraha District in the Sagarmatha Zone of south-eastern Nepal. At the time of the 1991 Nepal census it had a population of 4892 people living in 918 individual households.
