= Laksmipur Patari Rural Municipality =

Laxmipur Patari लक्ष्मीपुर पतारी
- Rural Municipality
- Location in Nepal
- Coordinates: 26.66°N 86.40°E
- Country: Nepal
- Development Region: Eastern
- Zone: Sagarmatha
- District: Siraha District
- Province: Province No. 2
- Established: 2016 A.D. (2073 B.S.)

Area
  - Total: 42.33 km^{2} (16.34 sq mi)

Population (2011)
  - Total: 26,913
  - Density: 635.8/km^{2} (1,647/sq mi)
  - Religions: Hindu Muslim

Languages
  - Local: Maithili
- Time zone: UTC+5:45 (NST)
- Postal Code: 56505
- Area code: 033
- Website: https://laxmipurpatarimun.gov.np/

Laxmipur Patari (Nepali: लक्ष्मीपुर पतारी ) is a Rural municipality in Siraha District in Province No. 2 of Nepal. It was formed in 2016 occupying current 5 sections (wards) from previous 5 former VDCs. It occupies an area of 42.33 km^{2} with a total population of 26,913.
