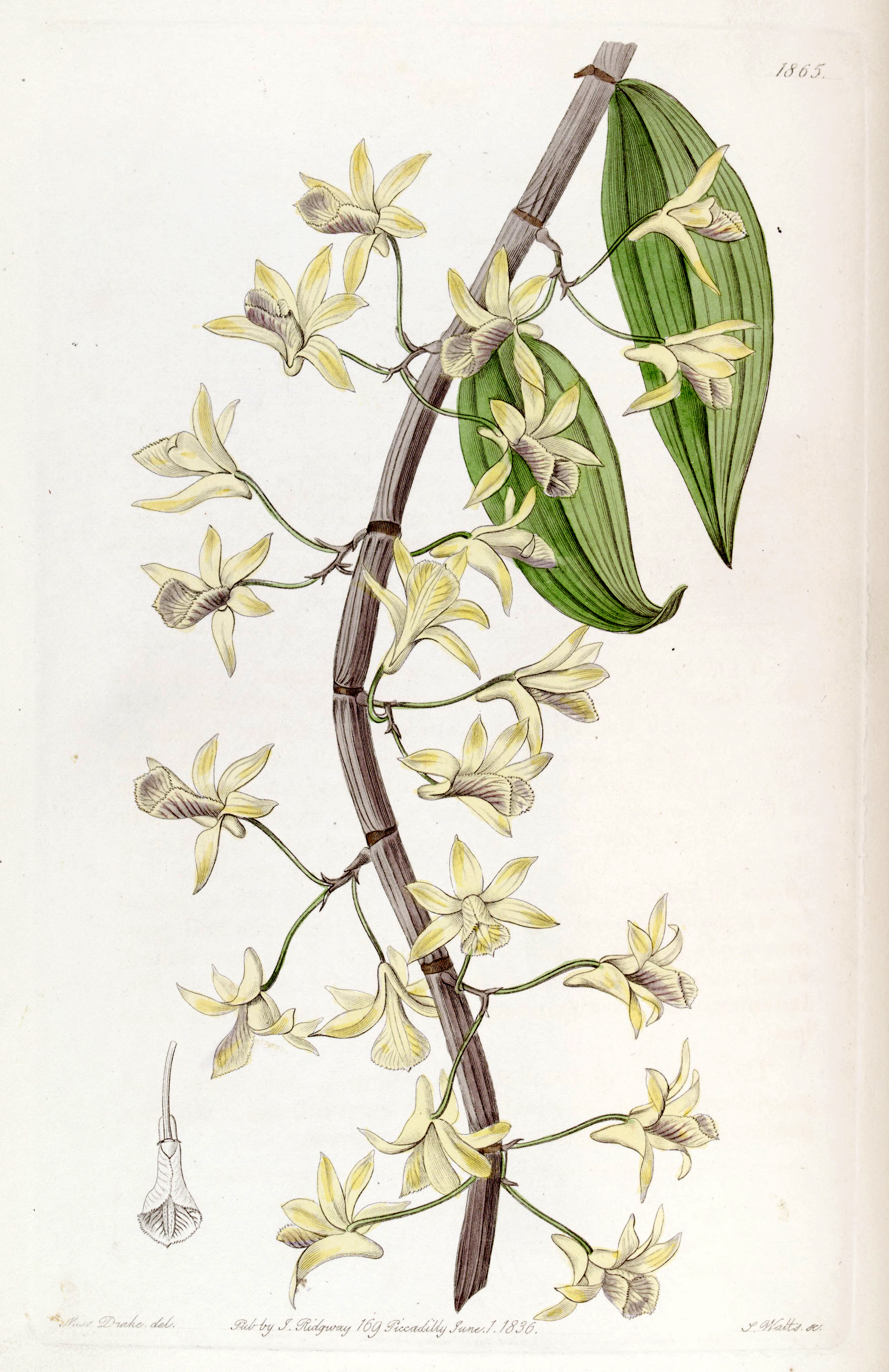
- Illustration by Sarah Drake from Edwards's Botanical Register

Scientific classification
- Kingdom: Plantae
- Clade: Tracheophytes
- Clade: Angiosperms
- Clade: Monocots
- Order: Asparagales
- Family: Orchidaceae
- Subfamily: Epidendroideae
- Genus: Dendrobium
- Species: D. aphyllum

Binomial name
- Dendrobium aphyllum (Roxb.) C.E.C.Fisch.

Synonyms
- List of synonyms: Limodorum aphyllum Roxb. (1795); Cymbidium aphyllum (Roxb.) Sw. (1799); Epidendrum aphyllum (Roxb.) Poir. (1810); Dendrobium cucullatum R.Br. (1821); Dendrobium pierardii R.Br. (1821); Pierardia bicolor Raf. (1821) nom. superfl.; Dendrobium pierardii var. latifolium F.Buyss. (1890); Dendrobium pierardii var. cucullatum (R.Br.) Hook.f. (1890); Dendrobium oxyphyllum Gagnep. (1950); Dendrobium madrasense A.D.Hawkes (1963) nom. illeg.; Dendrobium aphyllum var. cucullatum (R.Br.) P.K.Sarkar (1984); Dendrobium aphyllum var. katakianum I.Barua (2001)

= Dendrobium aphyllum =

Hooded orchid

Species of orchid

Dendrobium aphyllum, commonly known as the hooded orchid or 兜唇石斛 (dou chun shi hu) is a species of orchid native to Bangladesh, southern China, the eastern Himalayas, and Indochina.

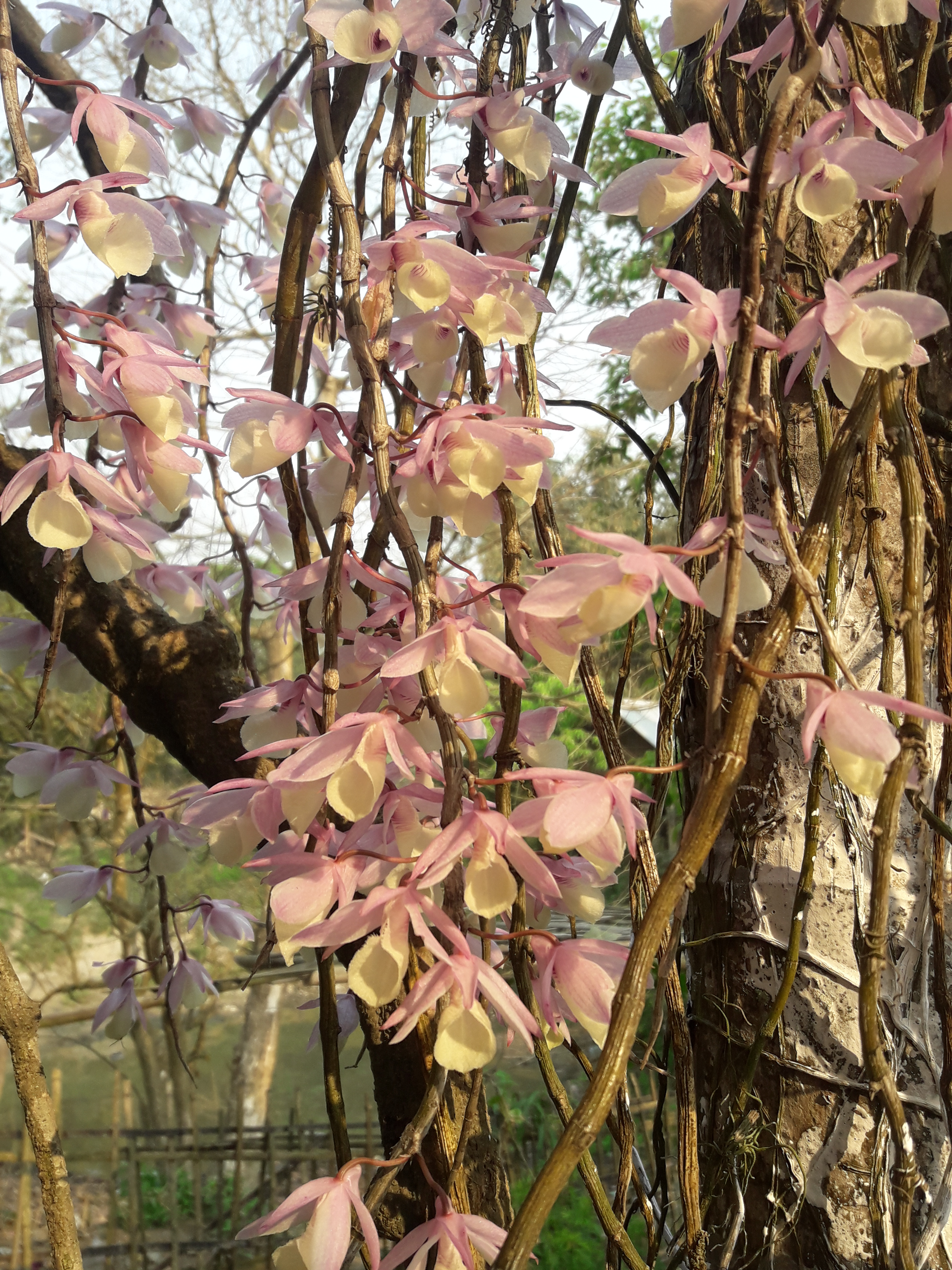
Dendrobium aphyllum at Golaghat, Assam
