= Navarajpur Rural Municipality =

Former Village Development Committee in Nepal

Navarajpur नवराजपुर
- Location in Nepal
- Coordinates: 26.60°N 86.42°E
- Country: Nepal
- Zone: Sagarmatha Zone
- District: Siraha District

Government janta samajwadi party nepal
  - Type: Elected

Population (2016)
  - Total: 19,056
- Time zone: UTC+5:45 (Nepal Time)
- Website: https://nawarajpurmun.gov.np/

Navarajpur is a rural municipality located in the southeastern part of Siraha District, Nepal.

== Administration ==
The Navarajpur Gaunpalika comprises several villages, including Navarajpur, Tamasuiya, Bachahi, Naharniya, Jhajhpatti, Sunderpur, Kursandi, Menha, Devnagar, Phulwariya, Jagatpur, Majhaura, Dhekha, Karmaniya, Bhagwatipur, and Geruwaha.

The office of the local bodies of Navarajpur Gaunpalika is situated in the "Shree Janta Madhyamik Vidyalaya Sonwarsha" school's building.

As of 2024, the mayor of this Gaunpalika is Mr. Shiv Udgar Yadav (Shiva).

== Villages ==
=== Navarajpur ===
Navarajpur is a village in the Siraha district of Nepal. The residents of this village have settled in various parts of the country. Among the 200 households, the majority of the population belongs to the Yadav community.

The village has several religious places and temples, including the "Maa Hajari Sthan." The goddess of this temple is worshipped by both the villagers and visitors. The nearby village of Bachahi is notable for the Ramjanki Temple, an ancient and significant religious site.

In 2017, a girl's hostel was constructed in Navarajpur with support from the Japanese government, aimed at improving access to higher education for female students.

=== Geruwaha ===
Nawajpur-01 (Geruwaha) has four gateways to enter the village. Although small, the village is lush with greenery and has extensive land for farming. Most of the residents are engaged in farming, while some hold government positions in various fields. The highest-ranking official from the village is Mr. Rijhan Yadav (DSP), who is also involved in private NGOs.

The villagers have strong faith in traditional healers known as Dhami and Jhakris. It is believed that the village is protected by Dihbar Baba, whose shrine is located on the western border of the village, connected to Tamasuiwa.

Mr. Kashi Yadav and Mr. Chabil Yadav lead two different political parties, the CPN and the Janta Samajwadi Party, respectively. The ward chairman of Nawajpur Ward No. 1 is Mr. Nabin Kumar Yadav, who was elected under the Janta Samajwadi Party Nepal.

Majhaura Majhaura is a village development committee in Siraha District in the Sagarmatha Zone of south-eastern Nepal. At the time of the 1991 Nepal census it had a population of 3964 people living in 678 individual households.
