= Belhi, Siraha =

Former Village Development Committee in Nepal

Balhi, Sagarmatha बलही
- Village development committee
- Location in Nepal
- Coordinates: 26.44°N 86.21°E
- Country: Nepal
- Zone: Sagarmatha Zone
- District: Siraha District

Population (2011)
  - Total: 4,014
- Time zone: UTC+5:45 (Nepal Time)

Balhi is a village development committee in Siraha District in the Sagarmatha Zone of south-eastern Nepal. At the time of the 2011 Nepal census it had a population of 4014 people living in 824 individual households.
