= Jamadaha =

Former Village Development Committee in Nepal

Coordinates: 26°50′N 86°21′E

Jamadaha जमादह
- Village development committee
- Interactive map of Jamadaha
- Country: Nepal
- Zone: Sagarmatha Zone
- District: Siraha District
- Time zone: UTC+5:45 (Nepal Time)

Jamadaha is a village development committee in Siraha District in the Sagarmatha Zone of south-eastern Nepal. At the time of the 1991 Nepal census it had a population of 3992 people living in 741 individual households.
