= Chandralalpur =

Former Village Development Committee in Nepal

Chandralalpur चन्द्रलालपुर
- Village development committee
- Location in Nepal
- Coordinates: 26.82°N 86.32°E
- Country: Nepal
- Zone: Sagarmatha Zone
- District: Siraha District

Population (2011)
  - Total: 4,269
- Time zone: UTC+5:45 (Nepal Time)
- Area code: +977-033
- Website: http://ddcsiraha.gov.np

Chandralalpur is a village development committee in Siraha District in the Sagarmatha Zone of south-eastern Nepal. At the time of the 2011 Nepal census it had a population of 7211 people living in 1307 individual households.
