= Muksar =

Former Village Development Committee in Nepal

Muksar मुक्सर
- Village development committee
- Location in Nepal
- Coordinates: 26.84°N 86.39°E
- Country: Nepal
- Zone: Sagarmatha Zone
- District: Siraha District

Population (1991)
  - Total: 2,974
- Time zone: UTC+5:45 (Nepal Time)

Muksar is a village development committee in Siraha District in the Sagarmatha Zone of south-eastern Nepal. At the time of the 1991 Nepal census it had a population of 2974 people living in 538 individual households. It is pollution free village and there is Thakuri caste leaving (source needed).
