= Vidhyanagar, Siraha =

Vidhyanagar विद्यानगर
- Village development committee
- Location in Nepal
- Coordinates: 26.67°N 86.37°E
- Country: Nepal
- Zone: Sagarmatha Zone
- District: Siraha District

Government

Population (1991)
  - Total: 3,965
- Time zone: UTC+5:45 (Nepal Time)

Vidhyanagar is a village development committee in Siraha District in the Sagarmatha Zone of south-eastern Nepal. At the time of the 1991 Nepal census it had a population of 3965 people living in 657 individual households.
