= Santosh Shah =

Nepalese Chef

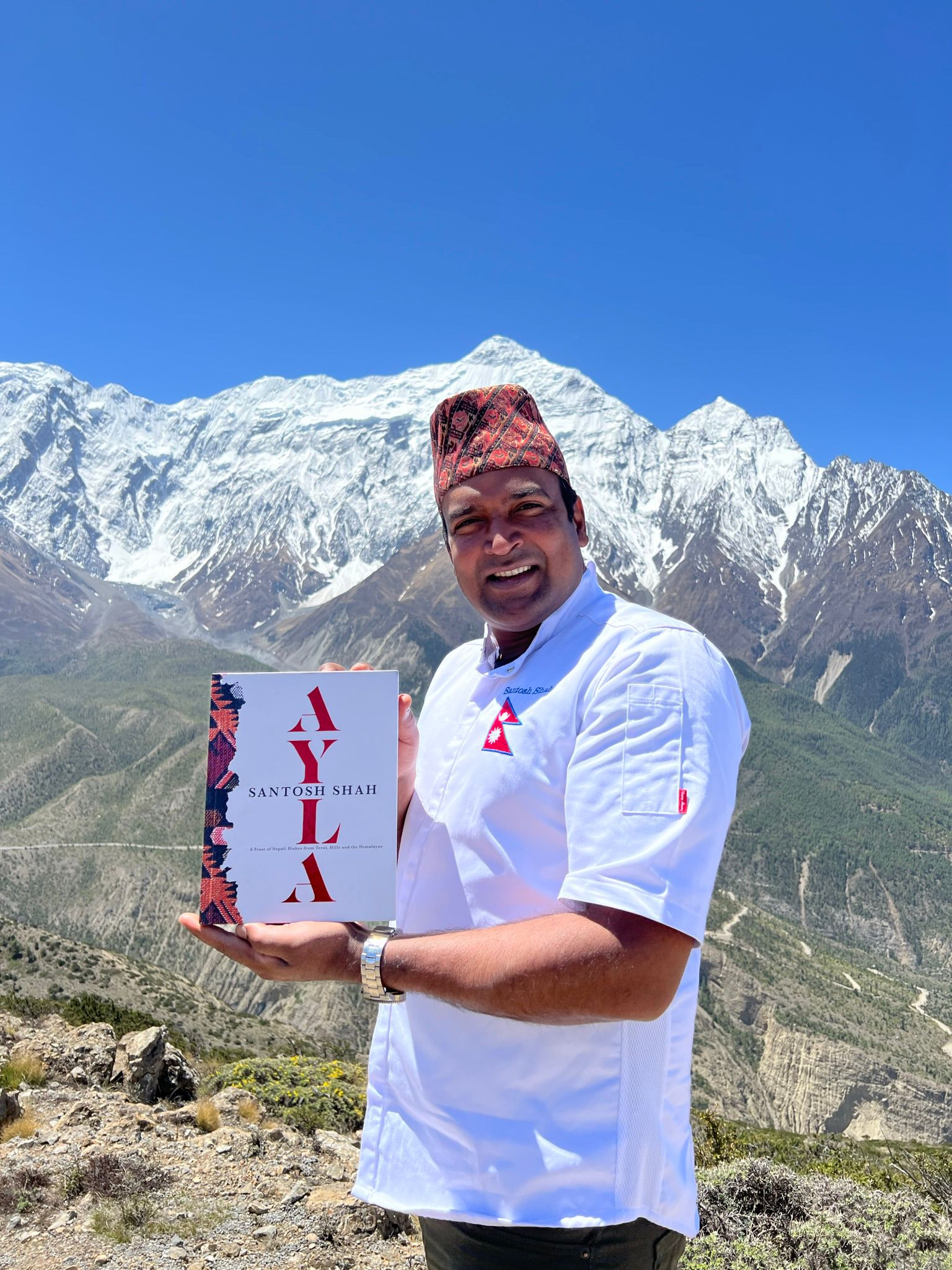
- Shah with his book Ayla in front of Nilgiri
- Born: 5 November 1985 (age 40); Karjanha, Siraha District, Nepal
- Occupation: Chef
- Known for: Promoting Nepalese and Mithila food worldwide.
- Notable work: Finalist in Masterchef UK 'The Professionals' - 2020, Winner of MasterChef: The Professionals Rematch Special - 2021 Masterjudge of CHEF NEPAL: Country's 1st Food Reality TV Show Mithila thali janakpur

Santosh Shah is a Nepalese chef based in London, known for competing in the UK's reality cookery TV series BBC MasterChef: The Professionals in 2020. Declared first runner up, Santosh is credited for popularising Nepalese cuisine in the UK and worldwide. In 2021, Santosh once again, competed in the UK's BBC MasterChef: The Professionals Rematch and was declared the winner.

== Early life ==
Santosh grew up in Karjhana village of Siraha district, a small village outside of Kathmandu. When he was nine, he started working as a labourer digging canals to support his family's financial needs. When he was 14, he travelled to India for his first culinary job as a dishwasher in a five-star hotel. It was at this point that Santosh realised his dream of becoming a chef. He worked under Executive Chef and CEO Vivek Singh for over two years, rising through the hospitality ranks in India. Santosh received his Diploma in Hotel & Catering Management from the Institute of Baroda, India before travelling to London in 2010.

== Career ==
Santosh worked at some of famous Indian restaurants in London including Dishoom and Michelin-starred Benares, before becoming a sous-chef at Chef Vivek Singh’s Westminster hot spot, The Cinnamon Club. Santosh worked at The Cinnamon Club for several years, before eventually becoming Head Chef at its sister restaurant, Cinnamon Kitchen, in the City.

In 2018 Santosh was appointed at Executive Chef of the five-star LaLit Hotel in London, where he worked until his appearance on MasterChef in 2020. He is currently living and working in Nepal owning multiple restaurants brand called Mithila thali and Ayla by santosh shah, he was Head of The Cinnamon Collection.

== Media appearances ==
Santosh first appeared on the UK’s reality cookery TV series MasterChef: The Professionals in 2020. He was runner-up in the series and was dubbed as the "People’s Champion."

In 2021 Santosh competed in MasterChef: The Professionals re-match, where he was declared the winner.

== Awards and achievements ==
- Runner up: BBC's UK MasterChef: The Professionals 2020
- Winner: BBC's UK MasterChef: The Professionals Rematch 2021
- Presidential award from Nepal President for promoting Nepali food to the world 2021
- The British Curry award for Restaurant Baluchi 2018
- Conde Nast Award for best fine dining 2018

== BBC’s UK MasterChef: The Professionals Rematch ==
Santosh won the UK's BBC MasterChef: The Professionals Rematch on 28 December 2021.The show was judged by Marcus Wareing, Monica Galetti, and Greg Wallace. Santosh defeated three other contestants, two of them Philli Armitage-Mattin and Bart van der Lee, who also appeared on BBC's UK MasterChef: The Professionals in 2020 with Santosh. Santosh won the title by creating an 18-dish vegan feast inspired by the Dashain festival in Nepal.

== Cookbook ==
- Ayla: A Feast of Nepali Dishes from Terai, Hills and Himalayas, DK, ISBN 978-0241535776
