= Phulkaha Kati =

Dhangadhimai Dhangadhimai municipality
- municipality
- Country: Nepal
- Zone: Sagarmatha Zone
- District: Siraha District

Population (1991)
  - Total: 6,813
- Time zone: UTC+5:45 (Nepal Time)

Phulkahakatti is a village development committee in Siraha District in the Sagarmatha Zone of south-eastern Nepal. But now it is in Dhangadhimai municipality. At the time of the 1991 Nepal census it had a population of 6813 people living in 1237 individual households.
