= Karjanha =

Former Village Development Committee in Nepal

Karajanha Municipality कर्जन्हा नगरपालिका
- Municipality
- Location in Nepal
- Coordinates: 26.86°N 86.22°E
- Country: Nepal
- Province: Madhesh Province
- District: Siraha District

Government
  - Type: Local development
  - Mayor: Bhola Pokharel
  - Deputy Mayor: Laxmi Kumari Shrestha

Population (1991)
  - Total: 5,296
- Time zone: UTC+5:45 (Nepal Time)
- Website: http://www.karjanhamun.gov.np/

Karjanha is a Municipality in Siraha District in the Madhesh Province of East of Nepal. At the time of the 1991 Nepal census it had a population of 5296 people living in 954 individual households. Also birthplace for two most famous people from this Municipality Chef Santosh shah and Upendra mahato
