= Bhokraha, Siraha =

Former Village Development Committee in Nepal

Bhokraha भोक्राहा,
- Village development committee
- Location in Nepal
- Coordinates: 26.5100°N 86.7500°E
- Country: Nepal
- Zone: Sagarmatha Zone
- District: Siraha District

Population (2011)
  - Total: 1,757
- Time zone: UTC+5:45 (Nepal Time)
- Area code: +977-033
- Website: ddcsiraha.gov.np

Bhokraha (Hindi:"भोक्राहा") is a Village Development Committee in Siraha District in the Sagarmatha Zone of south-eastern Nepal. At the time of the 2011 Nepal census it had a population of 1757 people residing in 341 individual households.
