= Aurahi Rural Municipality, Siraha =

Rural municipality in Nepal

Aurahi औरही
- Rural Municipality
- Location in Nepal
- Coordinates: 26.63°N 86.30°E
- Country: Nepal
- Development Region: Eastern
- Zone: Sagarmatha
- District: Siraha District
- Province: Madhesh Province
- Established: 2016 A.D. (2073 B.S.)

Area
  - Total: 35.87 km^{2} (13.85 sq mi)

Population (2011)
  - Total: 23,046
  - Density: 642.5/km^{2} (1,664/sq mi)
  - Religions: Hindu Muslim Christian

Languages
  - Local: Maithili
- Time zone: UTC+5:45 (NST)
- Area code: 033
- Website: aurahimunsiraha.gov.np

Aurahi (Nepali: औरही ) is a Rural municipality in Siraha District in Madhesh Province of Nepal. It was formed in 2016 occupying current 5 sections (wards) from previous 5 former VDCs. It occupies an area of 35.87 km^{2} with a total population of 23,046.
