= Bariyarpatti Rural Municipality =

Rural Municipality in Eastern, Nepal

Bariyarpatti बरियारपट्टी
- Rural Municipality
- Location in Nepal
- Coordinates: 26.63°N 86.34°E
- Country: Nepal
- Development Region: Eastern
- Zone: Sagarmatha
- District: Siraha District
- Province: Province No. 2
- Established: 2016 A.D. (2073 B.S.)

Area
  - Total: 37.72 km^{2} (14.56 sq mi)

Population (2011)
  - Total: 25,256
  - Density: 669.6/km^{2} (1,734/sq mi)
  - Religions: Hindu Muslim Christian

Languages
  - Local: Maithili
- Time zone: UTC+5:45 (NST)
- Postal Code: 56506
- Area code: 033
- Website: bariyapattimun.gov.np

Bariyarpatti (Nepali: बरियारपट्टी ) is a Rural municipality in Siraha District in Province No. 2 of Nepal. It was formed in 2016 occupying current 5 sections (wards) from previous 5 former VDCs. It occupies an area of 37.72 km^{2} with a total population of 25,256. Md Gulab Ansari
