= Maheshpur Gamharia =

Former Village Development Committee in Nepal

Maheshpur Patari महेश्पुर पतारी
- Location in Nepal
- Coordinates: 26.68°N 86.41°E
- Country: Nepal
- Zone: Sagarmatha Zone
- District: Siraha District

Population (1991)
  - Total: 3,174
- Time zone: UTC+5:45 (Nepal Time)

Maheshpur Patari is a village in Laxmipur patari VDC in Siraha District in the Sagarmatha Zone of south-eastern Nepal. Maheshpur Patari Village Development Committees. At the time of the 1991 Nepal census it had a population of 3174 people living in 589 individual households.
