= Siraha District =

District in Madhesh Province, Nepal

Coordinates: 26°39′0″N 86°12′0″E

Siraha District सिराहा जिल्ला
- District
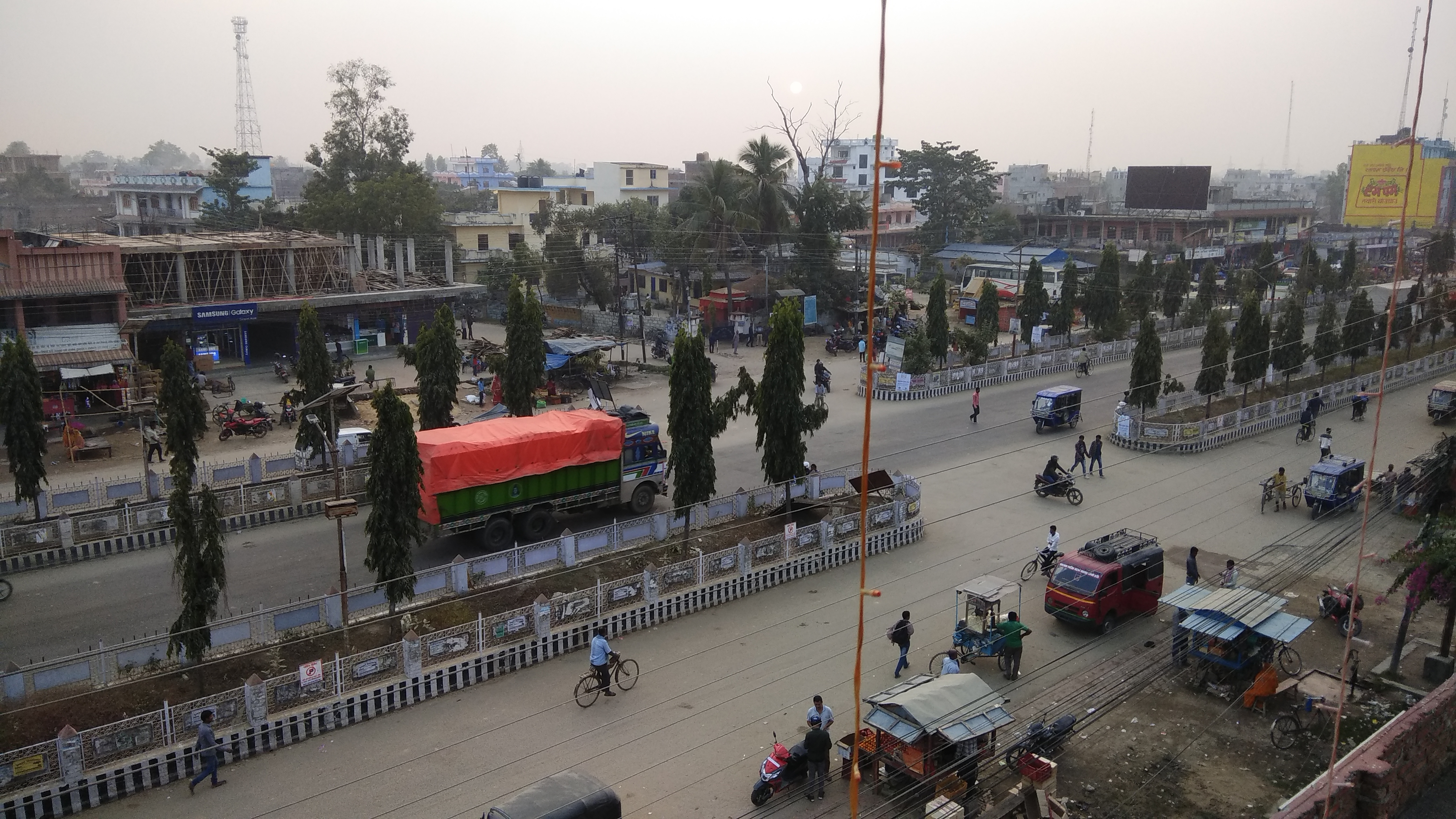
- Lahan Bazar in Siraha District
- Interactive map of Siraha District
- Country: Nepal
- Region: Mithila
- Province: Madhesh
- Admin HQ.: Siraha

Government
  - Type: Coordination committee
  - Body: DCC, Siraha

Area
  - Total: 1,188 km^{2} (459 sq mi)

Population (2011)
  - Total: 637,328
  - Density: 536.5/km^{2} (1,389/sq mi)
- Time zone: UTC+05:45 (NPT)
- Languages: English, Nēpālī, Maithili, others
- Website: daosiraha.moha.gov.np

Siraha District (Maithili: सिराहा जिल्ला;), a district in Madhesh Province, is one of the seventy-seven districts of Nepal. It is situated in the Terai belt of Nepal. The district, with Siraha Municipality as its district headquarters, covers an area of 1,188 km^{2} (459 sq mi). It has population of 739,953 according to census 2021 in which 49.2% are male where as 50.8% are female. The District is bordered with Saptari district in the east Balan River, Udayapur districting the north Chure Hill, Bihar state of India in the south and Dhanusa district in the west Kamala River. Majority of the population here is Yadav, Kushwaha(mahato), Tharus, Sah(teli), Muslims and ethnic minorities with majority population speaking English, Maithili language and Nēpālī language.

Lahan is the biggest and developed city of Siraha district which is also a top 5 biggest city of Madhesh Province which is popular for Sagarmatha Chaudhary Eye Hospital. Where most of the patients comes from Bihar, India. It lies in Mahendra highway like Mirchaiya and Golbazar which are 2nd and 3rd big cities of siraha district. Siraha district do have tourism place like Salahesh Fulbari, Salhesh Palace, Kamal Daha, Haathi Daha, Patari Mela, Dhamini Than, Aakash Ganga, etc.

Thadi (Maithili: ठाड़ी) or Thadi Viswaspatti is the main entry point for the district form India and a very old border town and a market place of Nepal in Siraha District bordering Indian town of Laukaha.

Thadi is one of the few towns which is a part of agreed route for Mutual Trade between India and Nepal. Nepal Government has set up a dedicated customs office in the town. The town connects Lahan to India.

== Infrastructure ==
There are no airports in this district but Rajbiraj Airport in nearby Saptari District is the nearest airport to the district, roughly 28–58 km away from various locations. Shree Airlines operates daily flights between Rajbiraj and Kathmandu

Thadi in Siraha is a part of one of the agreed route for Mutual Trade and custom point between India and Nepal. Nepal Government has set up a dedicated customs office in the town and Government of India has set up a Land Customs Station. So in simple import and export are allowed through this point.

The largest city is Lahan, where there is a popular eye hospital called Sagarmatha Choudhary Eye Hospital, Lahan.

== Transportation ==
The district is well connected with Mahendra Highway as this national Highway passes right through the district while connecting all the major towns. Other rural municipalities are also well connected by Postal Highway which is under construction and taking shape rapidly. Another major project i.e. East-West Railway also will run through this district in future and is in the process of development.

== Geography and climate ==
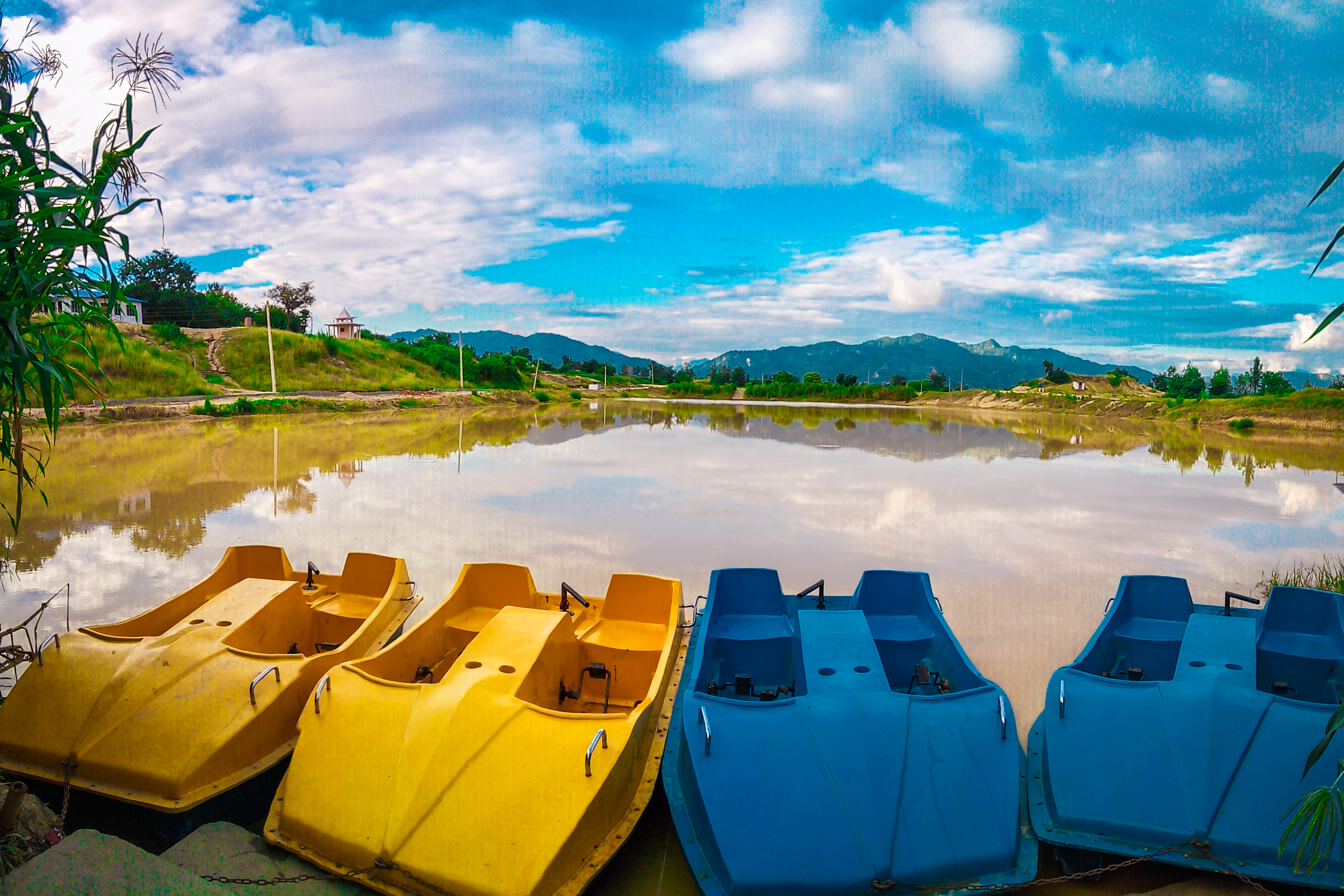
Kumbhikhadi Taal (lake), a tourist destination in Siraha district of Terai, Nepal.

Climate Zone	Elevation Range	% of Area
Lower Tropical	below 300 meters (1,000 ft)	90.5%
Upper Tropical	300 to 1,000 meters (1,000 to 3,300 ft)	9.5%

== Demographics ==
Historical population
Census year	Pop.	±% p.a.
1981	375,358	—
1991	460,746	+2.07%
2001	572,399	+2.19%
2011	637,328	+1.08%
2021	739,953	+1.50%
Source: Citypopulation

At the time of the 2021 Nepal census, Siraha District had a population of 739,953. 10.71% of the population is under 5 years of age. It has a literacy rate of 65.11% and a sex ratio of 1034 females per 1000 males. 513,568 (69.41%) lived in municipalities.

Ethnic groups/castes in Siraha district (2021)
1. Yadav (24.5%)
2. Muslim (8.13%)
3. Musahar (6.43%)
4. Kushwaha (6.04%)
5. Chamar (5.74%)
6. Teli (5.24%)
7. Tharu (3.80%)
8. Dhanuk (3.69%)
9. Paswan (3.34%)
10. Sundi (2.94%)
11. Mallaah (2.86%)
12. Kewat (2.40%)
13. Tatma (2.39%)
14. Khatwe (2.20%)
15. Other Madheshi non-Dalit (10.7%)
16. Hill Janjati (4.26%)
17. Khas non-Dalit (1.84%)
18. Other Madheshi Dalit (1.46%)
19. Others (2.02%)

Ethnicity/caste: Madheshis are the largest group. Yadavs are nearly 25% of the population. Muslims are 8% of the population, and Hill Janjati are 4% of the population.

Religion in Siraha district (2021)
Religion	Percent
Hinduism	90.27%
Islam	8.28%
Buddhism	1.11%
Other or not stated	0.34%

90% of the population was Hindu, 8% Muslim and 1% Buddhist.

Languages of Siraha district (2021)
1. Maithili (84.6%)
2. Nepali (3.53%)
3. Urdu (3.42%)
4. Tharu (3.23%)
5. Magahi (2.66%)
6. Others (2.58%)

Maithili is the largest language. Nepali is the second-largest language. Urdu and Tharu are spoken by a small minority.

Literacy: 50.1% could read and write, 2.7% could only read and 46.9% could neither read nor write.

English and Nepali are two major medium of written and spoken languages used in schools and public and government offices.

== Notable people ==
- Dr.Hemant Khatiwada –Senior Lyricist,Writer& Psychotherapist
- Pradip Giri – Nepali Congress politician and Member of House of Representatives
- Padma Narayan Chaudhary – Nepali Congress politician and former minister and member of House of Representatives
- Sita Devi Yadav – Nepali Congress treasurer and member of House of Representatives
- Chitralekha Yadav – Nepali Congress politician and Member of House of Representatives, Former Education Minister
- Santosh Shah (sahuji/baniya) – Nepali Chef
- Dharmanath Prasad Sah, Deputy chairman of CPN (Unified Socialist)
- Lila Nath Shrestha, CPN (UML), leader and former minister
- Mohammad Khalid Siddiqui, People's Socialist Party, Nepal Member of Rastriya Sabha
- Dr. Ganesh Kumar Mandal, Nepali Congress, Nepal Elected Member of Second Constituent Assembly from Siraha-6]]

== Education ==
- SSMYM Campus(Tribhuvan University)
- JS Murarka Campus (Tribhuvan University)
- Sagarmatha Higher School
- Lahan Technical Institute (CTEVT)
- Little Star School
- PVM Awasiya Bidyalaya

== Administration ==
The district consists of seventeen municipalities, out of which eight are urban municipalities and nine are rural municipalities. These are as follows:

- Lahan Municipality
- Dhangadhimai Municipality
- Siraha Municipality
- Golbazar Municipality
- Mirchaiya Municipality
- Kalyanpur Municipality
- Karjanha Municipality
- Sukhipur Municipality
- Bhagwanpur Rural Municipality Municipality
- Aurahi Rural Municipality
- Bishnupur Rural Municipality
- Bariyarpatti Rural Municipality
- Lakshmipur Patari Rural Municipality
- Naraha Rural Municipality
- Sakhuwanankar Katti Rural Municipality
- Arnama Rural Municipality
- Navarajpur Rural Municipality

=== Former Village Development Committees (VDCs) and Municipalities ===
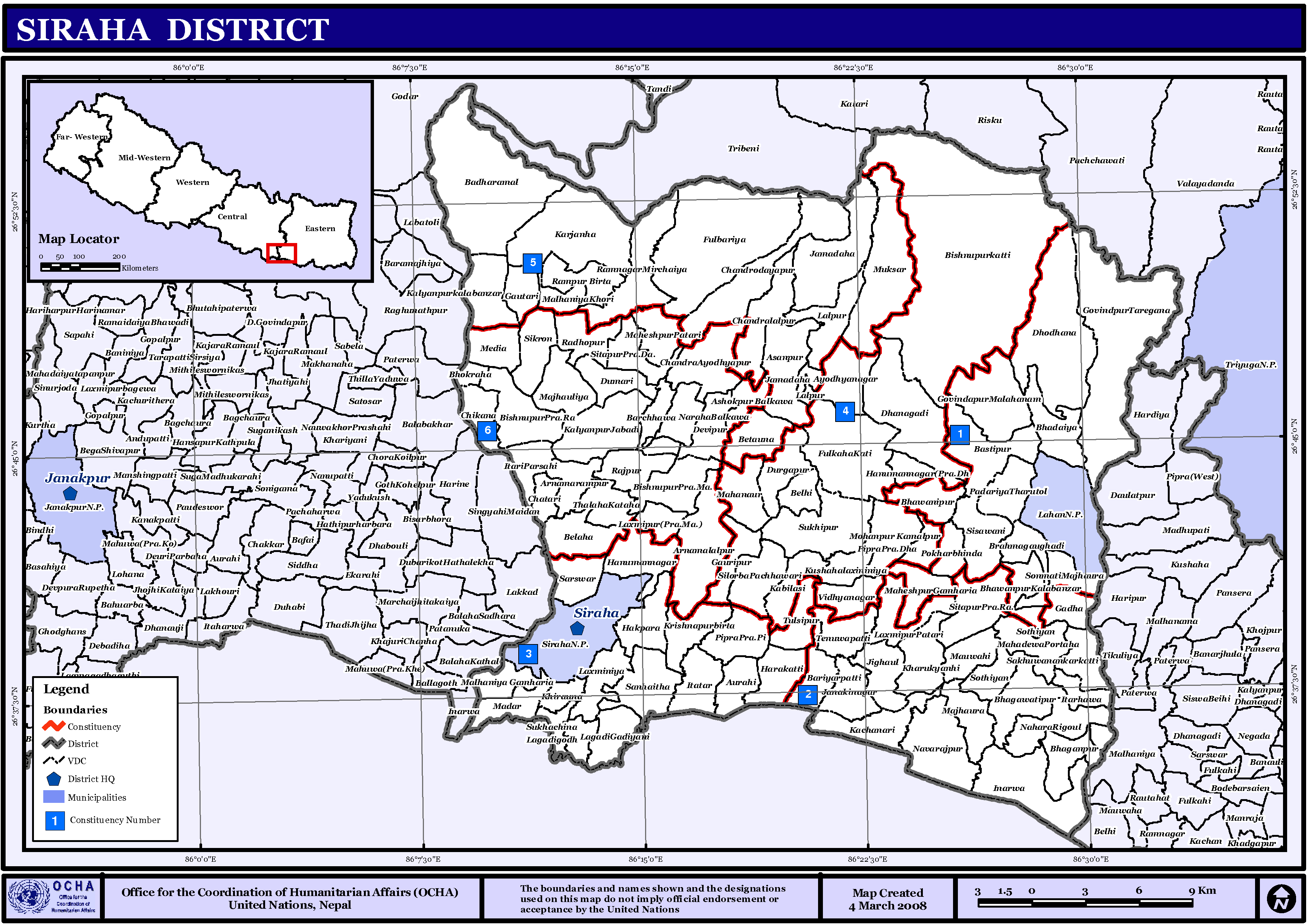
VDCs and Municipalities (blue) in Siraha District

- Arnama Lalpur
- Arnama Rampur
- Aurahi
- Ayodhyanagar
- Badharamal
- Barchhawa
- Bariyarpatti
- Bastipur
- Belaha
- Belhi
- Betauna
- Bhadaiya
- Bhagawanpur
- Bhagawatipur
- Bhawanipur
- Bhawanpur Kalabanzar
- Bhokraha
- Bishnupur Pra. Ma.
- Bishnupur Pra. Ra.
- Bishnupur Katti
- Brahmagaughadi
- Chandra Ayodhyapur
- Chandralalpur
- Chandraudyapur
- Chatari
- Chikana
- Devipur
- Dhangadi
- Dhangadhimai
- Dhodhana
- Dumari
- Durgapur
- Gadha
- Gauripur
- Gautari
- Golbazar
- Govindapur Malahanama
- Govindpur Taregana
- Hakpara
- Hanumannagar
- Harakathi
- Inarwa
- Itarhawa
- Itari Parsahi
- Itatar
- Jamadaha
- Janakinagar
- Jighaul
- Kabilasi
- Kachanari
- Kalyanpur Jabadi
- Kalyanpur Kalabanjar
- Karjanha
- Kharukyanhi
- Khirauna
- Krishnapur Birta
- Kushaha Laksiminiya
- Lagadi Gadiyani
- Lagadigoth
- Lahan
- Lalpur
- Laksminiya
- Laksmipur (Pra. Ma.)
- Laksmipur Patari
- Madar
- Mahadewa Portaha
- Mahanaur
- Maheshpur Gamharia
- Maheshpur Patari
- Majhauliya
- Majhau
- Makhanaha
- Malhaniya Gamharia
- Malhaniyakhori
- Mauwahi
- Mirchaiya
- Media
- Mohanpur Kamalpur
- Muksar
- Nahara Rigaul
- Naraha Balkawa
- Navarajpur
- Padariya Tharutol
- Phulkaha Kati
- Pipra Pra. Dha.
- Pipra Pra. Pi
- Pokharbhinda
- Rajpur
- Ramaul
- Rampur Birta
- Sakhuwanankar Katti
- Sanhaitha
- Sarshwar
- Sikron
- Silorba Pachhawari
- Siraha
- Sisawani
- Sitapur Pra. Da.
- Sitapur Pra. Ra.
- Sonmati Majhaura
- Sothayan
- Sukhachina
- Sukhipur
- Tenuwapati
- Thalaha Kataha
- Thegahi
- Tulsipur
- Vidhyanagar

== See also ==
- Zones of Nepal
- Paudhur
