= Raja Rani Lake =

Lake in Nepal

Raja Rani
- राजा रानी (Nepali)
- Range on Rani Lake

- Location in Nepal
- Interactive map of Raja Rani
- Location: Morang
- Coordinates: 26.883°N 87.435°E
- Lake type: Freshwater
- Primary inflows: Raja Rani Temple & Dhimal Temple
- Basin countries: Nepal
- Max. length: 0.8 km (0.50 mi)
- Max. width: 2 km (1.2 mi)
- Surface area: 0.32 km^{2} (0.1 sq mi)
- Average depth: 3.6 m (12 ft)
- Max. depth: 3.6 m (12 ft)
- Water volume: 0.046 km^{3} (0.011 cu mi)
- Surface elevation: 453 m (1,486 ft)
- Frozen: Does not freeze
- Settlements: Letang, Bhogateni, Pathari-Sanischare Municipality, Belbari

Raja Rani lake (Nepali: ne:राजा रानी) is a lake and orchid sanctuary located at Letang Municipality, the North of the Morang District, Province No. 1. The area is a wetland, surrounded by Sal (Shorea robusta) forest and lake is stream-fed but a dam regulates the water reserves, therefore, the lake is classified as semi-natural freshwater lake. Of the three ponds, Raja Pokhari, Rani Pokhari, and Rajkumari Pokhari, Rani Pokhari has 1 sq mi (2.6 km^{2}) of dense forest growing up from the water, and its orchid-rich habitat is a center of attraction.

This places occupies two temples; Raja Rani Temple and Dhimal's Temple.
