= Kaseni =

Kaseni may refer to:

- Kaseni, Lumbini in Palpa District in Nepal
- Kaseni, Kosi in Morang District in Nepal
