= Betana wetland =

Natural wetland in Nepal

- बेतना सिमसार
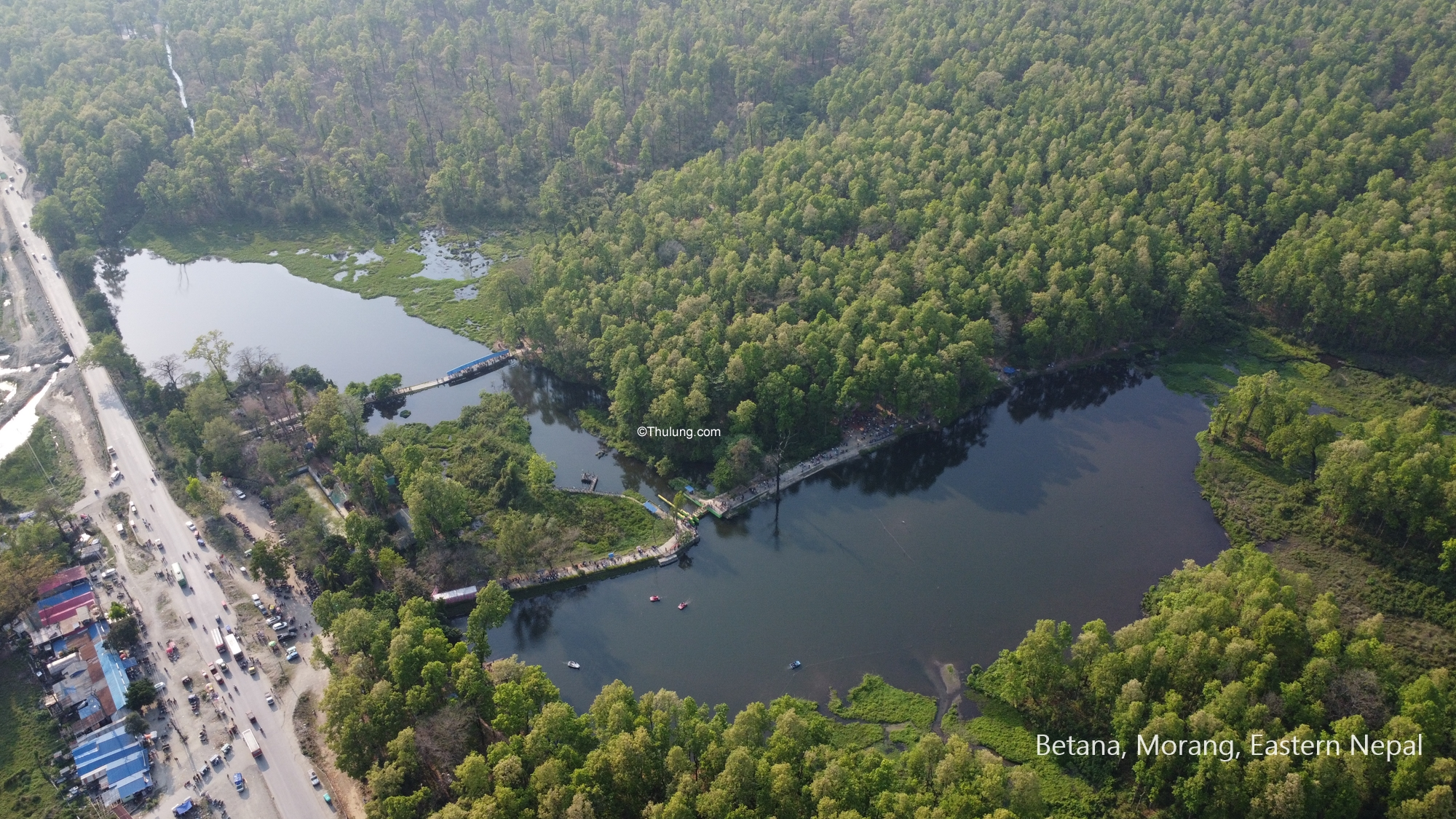
- Aerial view of Betana wetland
- Type: Wetland
- Location: Morang district, Nepal
- Nearest city: Itahari
- Area: 175 hectares (430 acres)

Betana wetland, or Betana Simsar (Nepali: बेतना सिमसार), is located in Belbari Municipality of Morang district of Nepal. It lies about 15 km east of Itahari, at an altitude of about 123 m. The lake has an area of about 5.5 ha. The forest area is about 175 ha, and it is a part of Charkose Jhadi.

The wetland contains endangered plants and animals such as tortoise, fishes, birds, and indigenous flowers. About 49 species of birds have been reported in the area. The major portion of the forests consists of saal and khair-sisoo trees. The wetland region is home to a variety of birds species, including migratory birds.

To attract tourists, a zoo has been constructed inside the area along with some other infrastructure.

In 2022, a critically endangered black softshell turtle was identified in the Betana wetland. It had been in existence in the area for a long time but was mistaken for a peacock turtle.

== Gallery ==
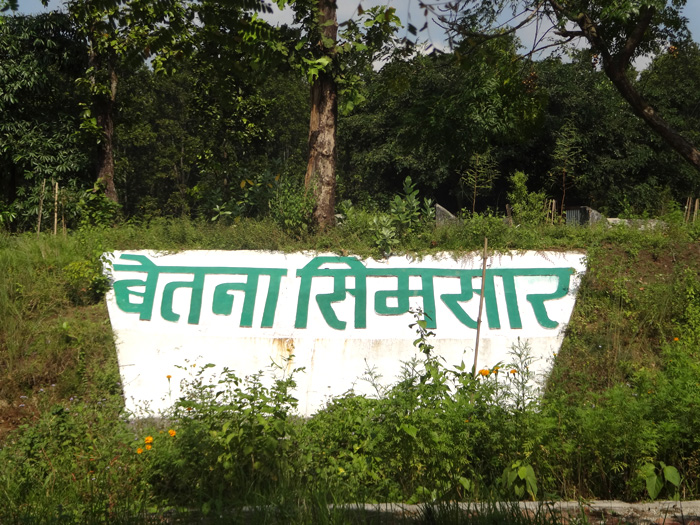

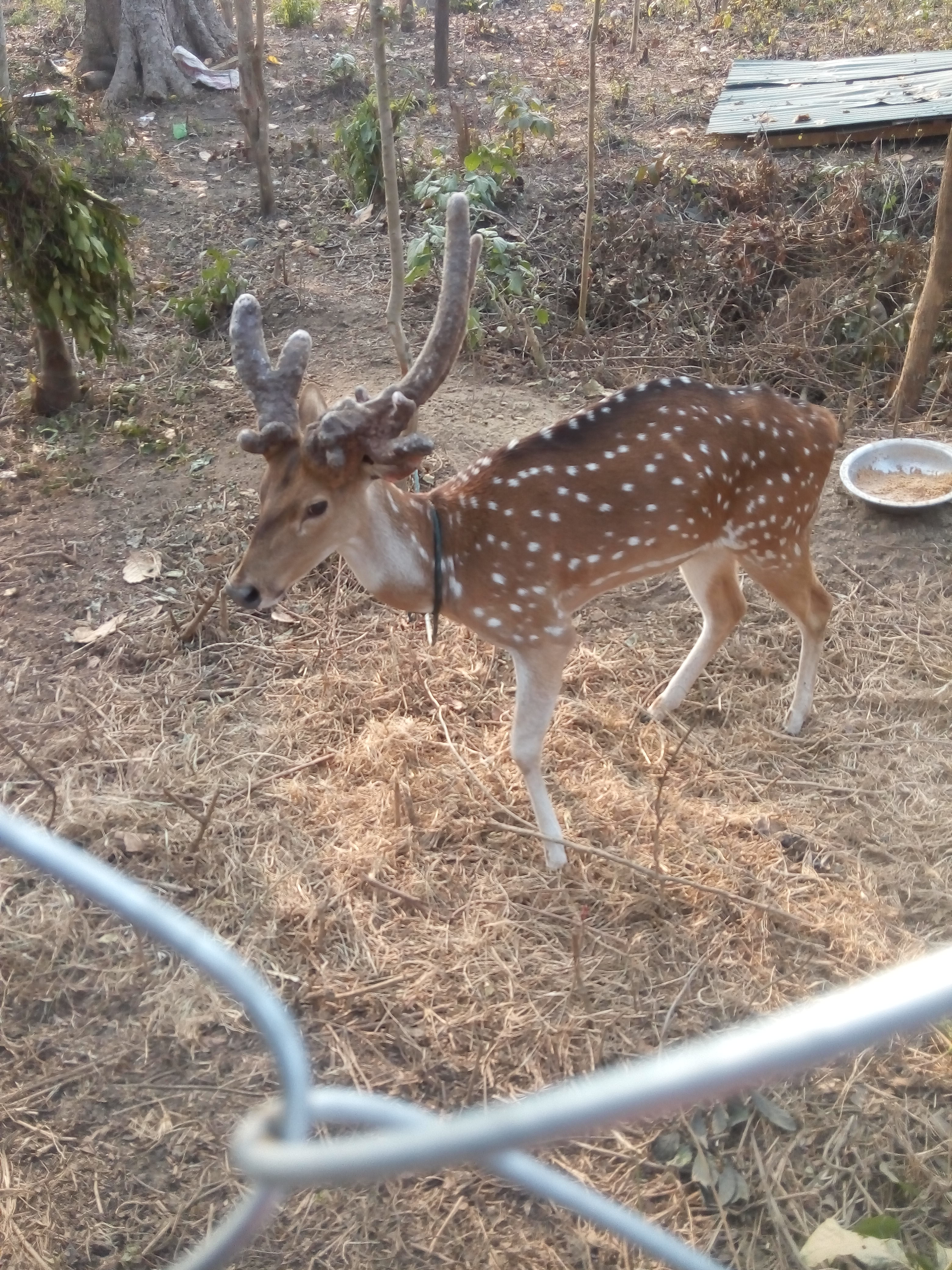

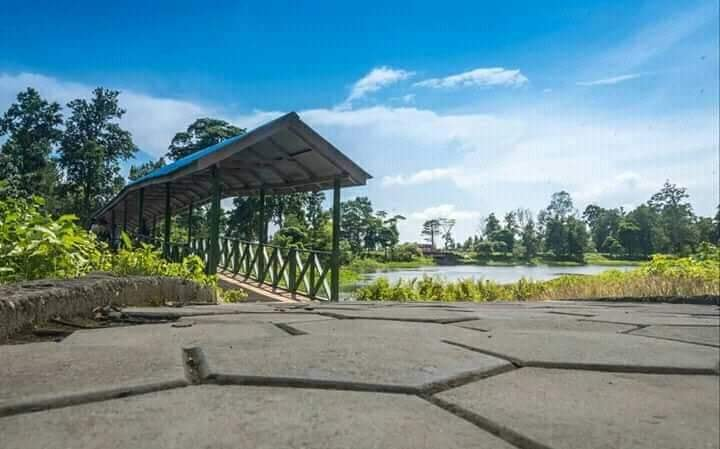
