= Belbari Municipality =

Belbari बेलबारी
- Municipality (नगरपालिका)
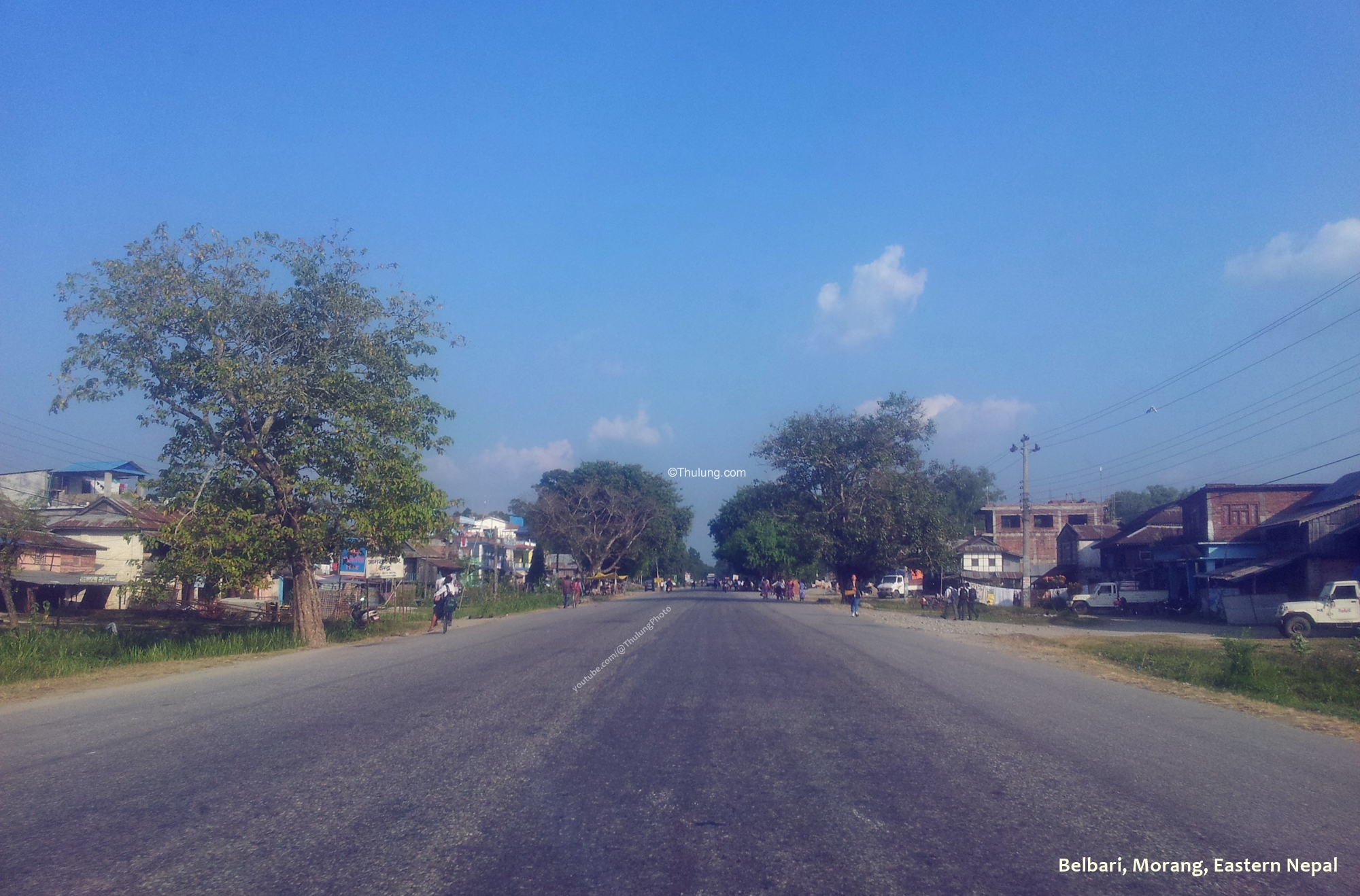
- Belbari Morang

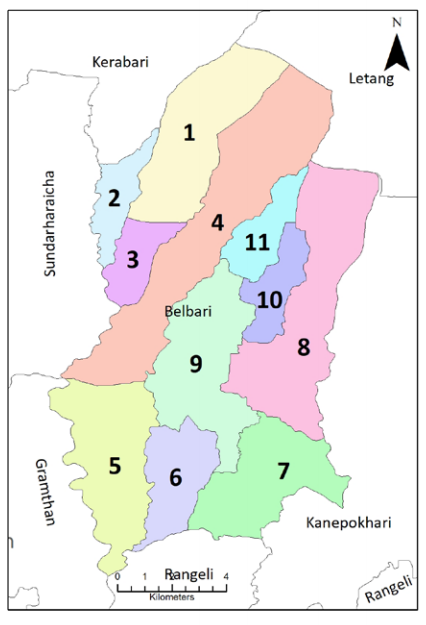
- Map of the village development committees in Morang District

- Location in Nepal
- Coordinates: 26.67°N 87.43°E
- Country: Nepal
- Province: Koshi
- District: Morang

Government
  - Type: Mayor–council
  - Mayor: Ramu Giri (UML)
  - Deputy mayor: Sagar Gurung (Nepali Congress)
  - Chief administrative officer: Dhakal
  - Information Officer: Krishna Neupane (9842402471)

Area
  - Total: 132.79 km^{2} (51.27 sq mi)

Population (2021 Nepal census)
  - Total: 81,771
  - Density: 615.79/km^{2} (1,594.9/sq mi)
  - Ethnicities: Dhimal Bahun Chhetri Limbu Rai Tamang Magar Dalit Tharu
- Time zone: UTC+5:45 (NST)
- Area code: 56600
- Website: official website

Belbari, (Nepali: बेलबारी), officially known as Belbari municipality, is one of the major suburbs of Morang district, Koshi Province. It lies in the eastern Terai region of Nepal. Previously a village development committee (VDC), it was upgraded to the municipality status in 2014. In order to meet the requirements to become a municipality, Belbari VDC merged Kaseni VDC with itself, making it larger in total area. Moreover, in 2017 AD VDC like Dangihat and Bahuni merged with it to become present Belbari Municipality. Now it has 11 ward offices. It had a population of 81,771 people living in 18,945 households, making it the third most populous city in Morang district.

Belbari is spread over approximately 25 square miles. All of the area is plain land, geographically. It is bordered on North and East by the largest and the densest forest of Nepal, the Charkose Jhadi (English translation: "Four Yard Bush"). It is bounded on the northeast by Charkose Jhadi, while to the east lies another suburb, Laxmimarga and Kanepokhari Rural Municipality. Similarly, the north part is bounded by Kerabari Rural Municipality and Letang Municipality, while to the west lies the Sundar Haraicha Municipality.

== Etymology ==
The name Belbari derived from two different Nepali names "Bel" and "Bari", i.e. "बेल" र "बारी"= बेलबारी. In English, Bel is called wood-apple. Elephant apple and monkey fruit are its other name. Its scientific name is Limonia acidissima. Bel is a native tree of Nepal, and Bari means a dry land. So as a myth, it is believed among older generations that the name Belbari means "the land of the Bel(s)" (Bel-nai-bel bhayeko thau). Religiously, the Bel leaves have its own value in Hindu religion for sacred purpose. Especially leaves of Bel use in the worship, rituals and temples. Basically, for the worship fulpati should be prepared, fulpati is a variety of mixed flowers along with the leaves of Bel which is sacred thing for the God and Goddess. Some ethnic people Rai, Limbu and Dhimal also use Bel's leaves in their rituals such as dhami/jharki (Shamans) of Rais and Limbus, and Bhumi Puja (worship of the earth) of Dhimals. Today Bel trees can be found in the Charkose Jhadi.

=== Early history ===
There is not exactly known when the people were first inhabited in Belbari. However, since the end of 19th century, the Dhimals were started to settle on this region. Dhimals are one of the first aboriginal inhabitants of this lowland region who speak a Tibeto-Burman language. Not only Belbari but many lowland plain areas of Morang and Jhapa were their ancestral land. Although Dhimals are the first inhabitants of Belbari, there is no any exact literature about their place of origin.

== Production and livelihood systems ==
Belbari municipality is mainly characterized by strong terrain and fertile land, where the larger flatland is compulsorily using for farming system. Due to the dense forest resource, a number of small streams and wetland, for instance Amuna khola, Sisauli Khola and Betana wetland, are available in this area and those water resources help to the larger flatland for farming system. Paddy, maize, wheat, mustard, varieties of vegetables such as cauliflower, potatoes, ginger, onion are the principal crops grown in this area. Many varieties of paddy are planted in irrigated terraces in two seasons in a single year. In two seasons, during April to September, the fields are using for paddy and maize primarily, farmers are most busy on that period. Although Belbari is semi-urban, most of the people are engaging in agricultural work for their livelihood purpose.

=== Wards ===
Belbari Municipality is currently divided into 11 wards.

Ward no.	Ward president	Ward contact number
1	Mani Bahadur Pulami Magar	9852021955
2	Krishna Bahadur Gurung	9852059031
3	Yogendra Prasad Subedi	9852056217
4	Chandra Bahadur Limbu	9819025617
5	Dilli Bahadur Katuwal	9805315693
6	Tek Bahadur Rai	9852029099
7	Sunita Chaudhary	9863751559
8	Dhanapati Gautam	9811307589
9	Saligram Basnet	9842437449
10	Ganga Bahadur Yakha	9842045216
11	Bikram Rai	9852055523

== Local level elections 2079 ==
Party	Mayor/chairperson	Deputy mayor/chairperson	Results
Nepali Congress	Mahendra Prasad Subedi	Nitu Thapa	Deputy
CPN (Unified Marxist–Leninist)	Dil Prasad Rai	Til Kumari Neupane	Mayor
Communist Party of Nepal (Maoist Centre)	Nagendra Khadka	Netra Kumari Thapa	
Communist Party of Nepal (Unified Socialist)	Bhupal Basnet	Shanti Devi Dhungana	
Rastriya Prajatantra Party	Khem Prasad Gautam	Shanti Devi Dhungana	
Nepal Workers' and Peasants' Party	Shyam Bahadur Darji	–	
Mangol National Origination	Bhim Rai	Babita Dhimal	
Janata Samajwadi Party	–	Amir Magar	
Independents	Ram Bahadur Chauhan	–	
Independents	–	Rukmini Dhimal	
Independents	–	Niraj Adhikari	
