= Letang Municipality =

Letang लेटाङ
- Municipality
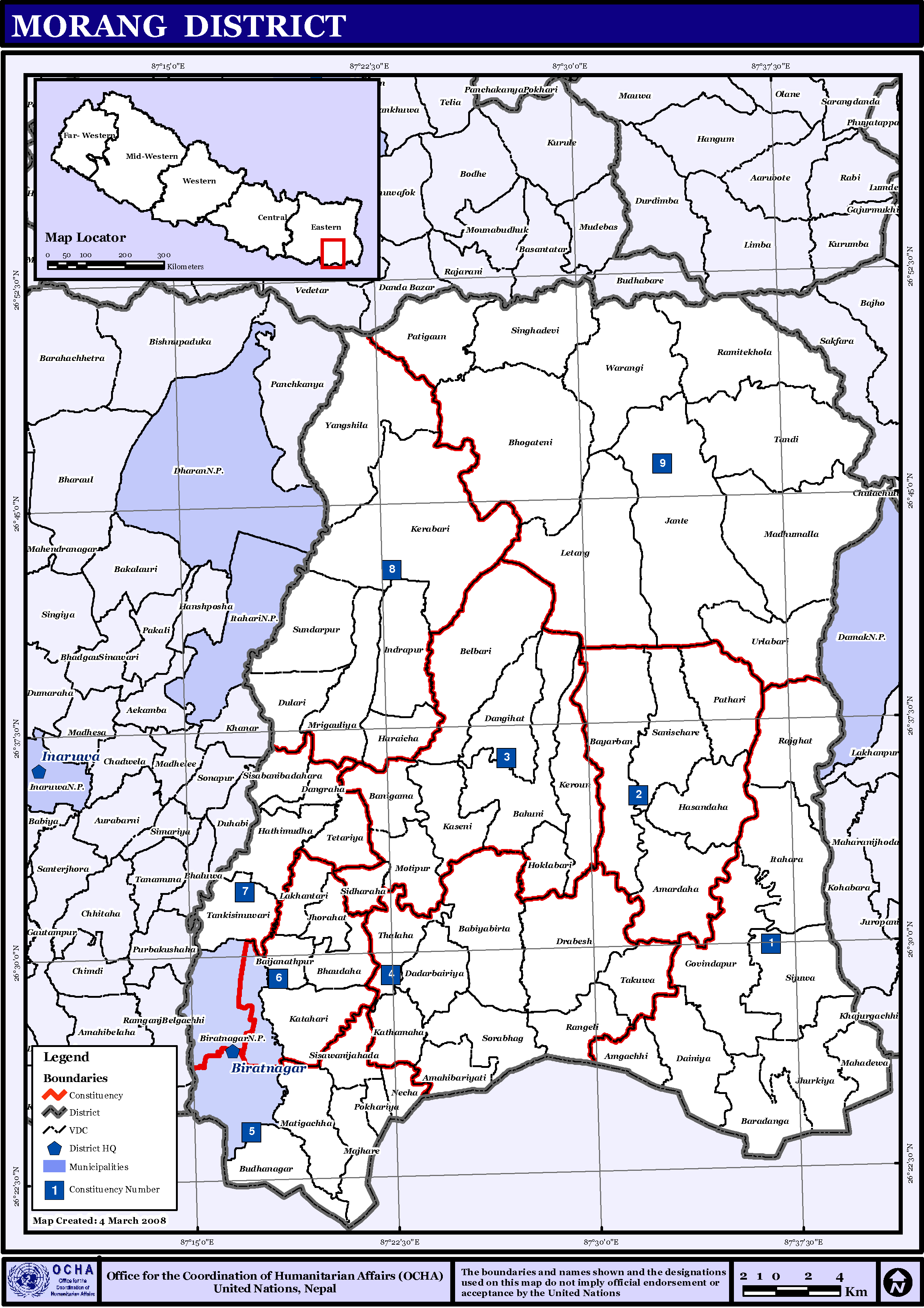
- Morang District municipalities. Letang in center of the northern part

- Location in Nepal
- Coordinates: 26.72°N 87.50°E
- Country: Nepal
- Province: Koshi Province
- District: Morang District

Government
  - Type: Mayor-council government
  - Mayor: Bhupendra Kumar Lawati
  - Deputy Mayor: Krishna Kumari Pokharel Niraula (NCP)

Area
  - Total: 219.2 km^{2} (84.6 sq mi)

Population (2021)
  - Total: 38,152
  - Density: 170/km^{2} (440/sq mi)
- (18,038 "Male" & 20,114 "Female")
- Time zone: UTC+5:45 (NST)
- Postal code: 56609
- Area code: 021
- Website: official website

Letang, "लेटाङ " is a municipality with 9 wards in Morang District in the Koshi Province of Nepal. It was formed by merging the existing Village Development Committees of Letang, Jante, Warrangi and Bhogateni. This municipality is situated in Hilly Region as well as Terai Region. Previously it was called Letang Bhogateni but now it's known as Letang.

== Location ==
Letang is in the north of Morang District. It has 9 wards, and an area of 119 square kilometres (46 sq mi).

Letang is situated on the bank of the Chisang River. It is located 46 km Northeast of Biratnagar 394 km east of Kathmandu, at the northern edge of the Terai plain below the Hills. It is a municipality and the urban core of a rapidly growing urban agglomerate in Nepal. It has neighbouring municipalities like Koshi Haraicha, Belbari, Pathari-Sanischare etc.. Letang Municipality is one of the developed municipalities of Morang district with various utilities including drinking water, electricity, communication, etc.

There is also uneven population distribution in this VDC. Many national politicians, players, and film actors such as Chandan Khanal, Ishwari Koirala, Babu Bogati, Praween Khatiwada, and Ram Bhujel are also from this village. A Nepali music composer, Pralhad Bogatee, from Kathmandu is also staying here for years. The yearly Rajarani Festival (Mohatshob) is also celebrated by various organizations. The villages including Phadani, Budhabare, Kheruwa, Khaireni, Kirtiman, Kamalpur, Lokhra, Kuinkunda, Biran, etc. lie here. Among them Letang Bazaar is the most developed and Rajarani has religious and tourism importance being an old village in Letang.

== Population ==
At the time of the 2021 Nepal Census Letang had a population of 38,152 people. There were 18,038 males and 20,114females.

== Religion and ethnicity ==
Temples including Rajarani temple (one of the oldest temple of this area), Laxmi Narayan Mandir, Laxmi Panchayan Mandir etc. lies here. The main ethnic groups here are Limbu, Brahmin, Chhetri, Magar, Rai, Tamang etc.

== Economy ==
More than 70% of the people in this municipality are engaged in agriculture.

== Education ==
Schools and educational campuses in the area include Letang Campus, Shanti Bhagawati School Shree Shiksha Vikash M. V. (Kheruwa), Laxmi School, Galaxy Academy, Green Valley School, Minaruwa School, Letang Secondary Boarding School, Bal Niketan School, Pathibhara Boarding School lies here. There is the eastern regional training academy of Nepal Army and also the eastern regional training Centre of Agricultural Development Bank, though the bank does not exist nearby. ssB NOOP
