= Kaseni, Morang =

Kaseni कसेनी is a town center under Belbari Municipality in Morang District in the Kosi Zone of south-eastern Nepal. Kaseni was merged into Belbari Municipality in May 2014.

At the time of the 1991 Nepal census it had a population of 6,545 living in 1,227 individual households.
