= Tarahara =

Tarahara तरहरा
- Neighbourhood
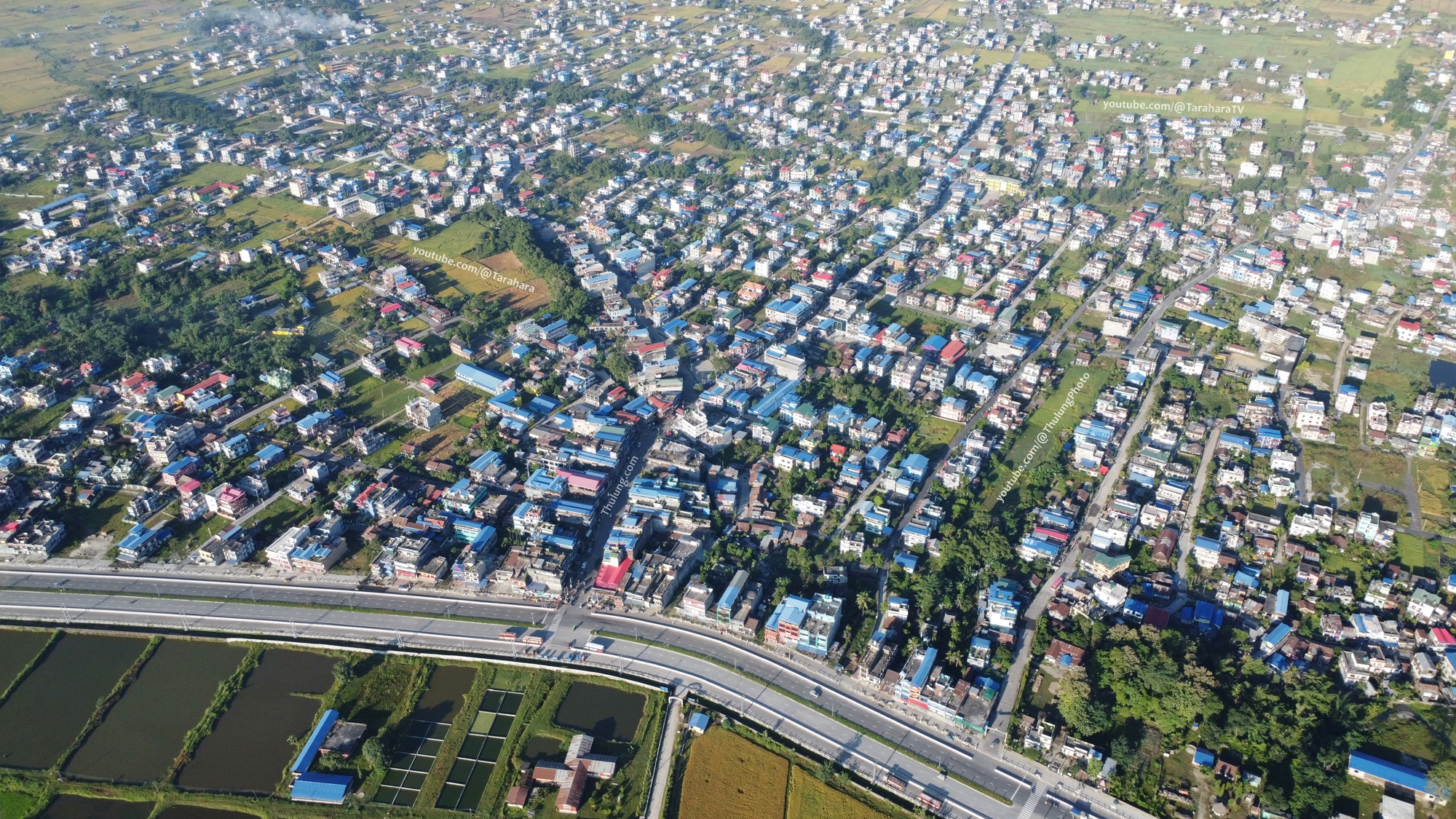
- Aerial view of Tarahara
- Nickname: Tarahara
- Motto: Agriculture Town
- Tarahara
- Country: Nepal
- District: Sunsari
- Area: Itahari
- Time zone: GMT +5:45
- Postal code: 56705

Tarahara (तरहरा) is a town in Sunsari District of Nepal. It is located on Koshi Highway between Itahari and Dharan. Tarahara has two municipalities, Itahari-19 and Itahari-20, which come under Itahari sub-metropolitan.

== Suburbs of Tarahara ==
- Amaha (अमाहा)
- Barampur (बरमपुर)
- Behibare (Tarahara) Bazar (बिहीबारे बजार)
- Bhawanipur (भवानीपुर)
- Chautari Chowk (चौतारी चौक)
- Dhanpuri (धनपुरी)
- Hansposa (हाँसपोसा)
- Hattigauda (हत्तिगौडा)
- High School (हाइ-स्कूल)
- Humps (Tarahara South) (हम्प्स / दक्षिण तरहरा)
- Karaiban (करैबन)
- Korean Chowk (कोरियन चौक)
- Majora (मजोरा)
- Mauliya (मौलिया)
- Nayatole (नया टोल)
- Pateruwa (पटेरुवा)
- Rai Gau (राई गाउँ)
- Sakela Tole (साकेला टोल)
- Sundar Tole (सुन्दर टोल)
- Tamang Tole (तामांग टोल)
- Tarahara Chowk (तरहरा चौक)
- Zabdee (ज़ब्दी)

== Gallery: suburbs of Tarahara ==
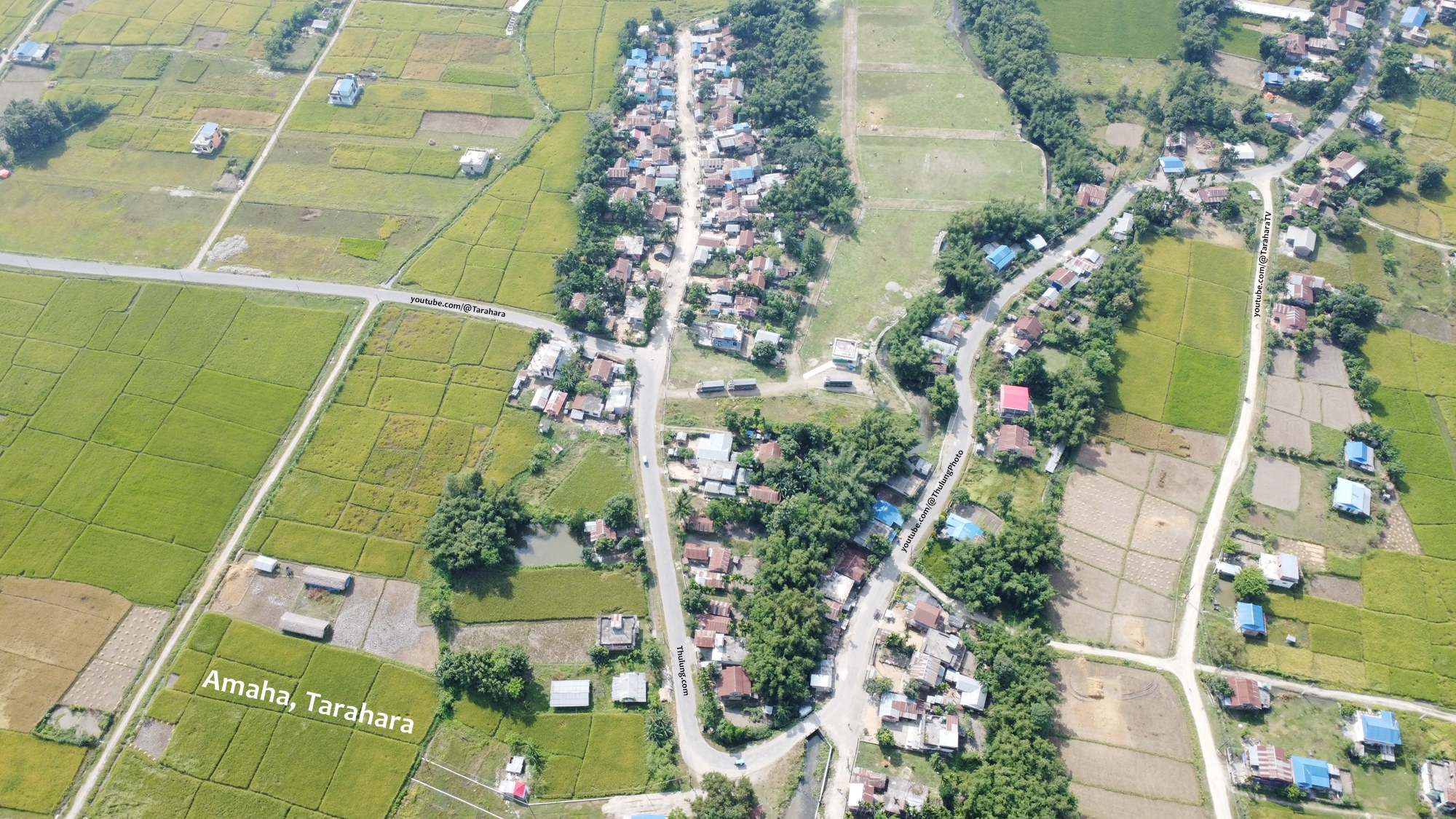
Drone shot of Amaha, Tarahara

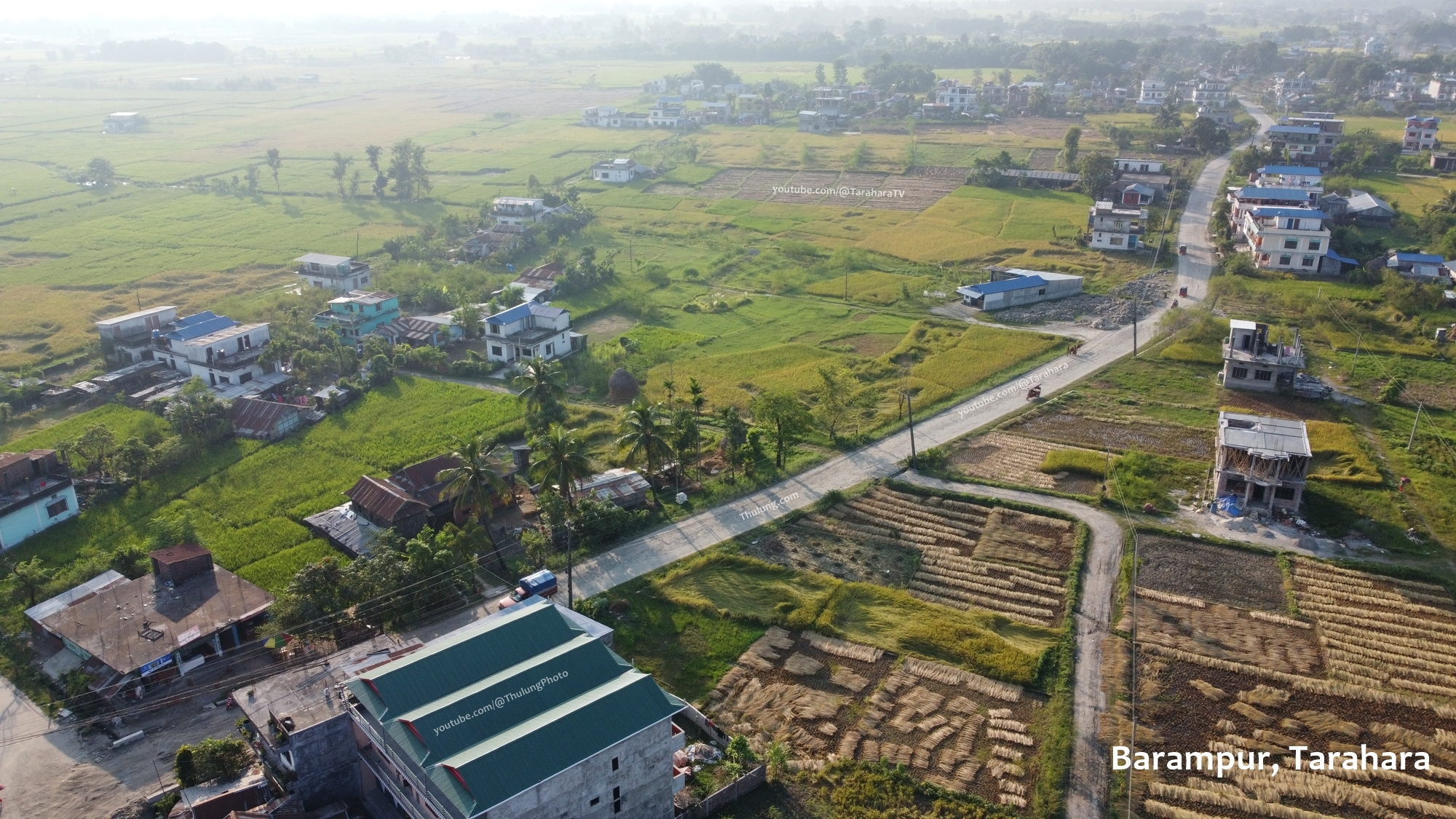
Barampur, Tarahara

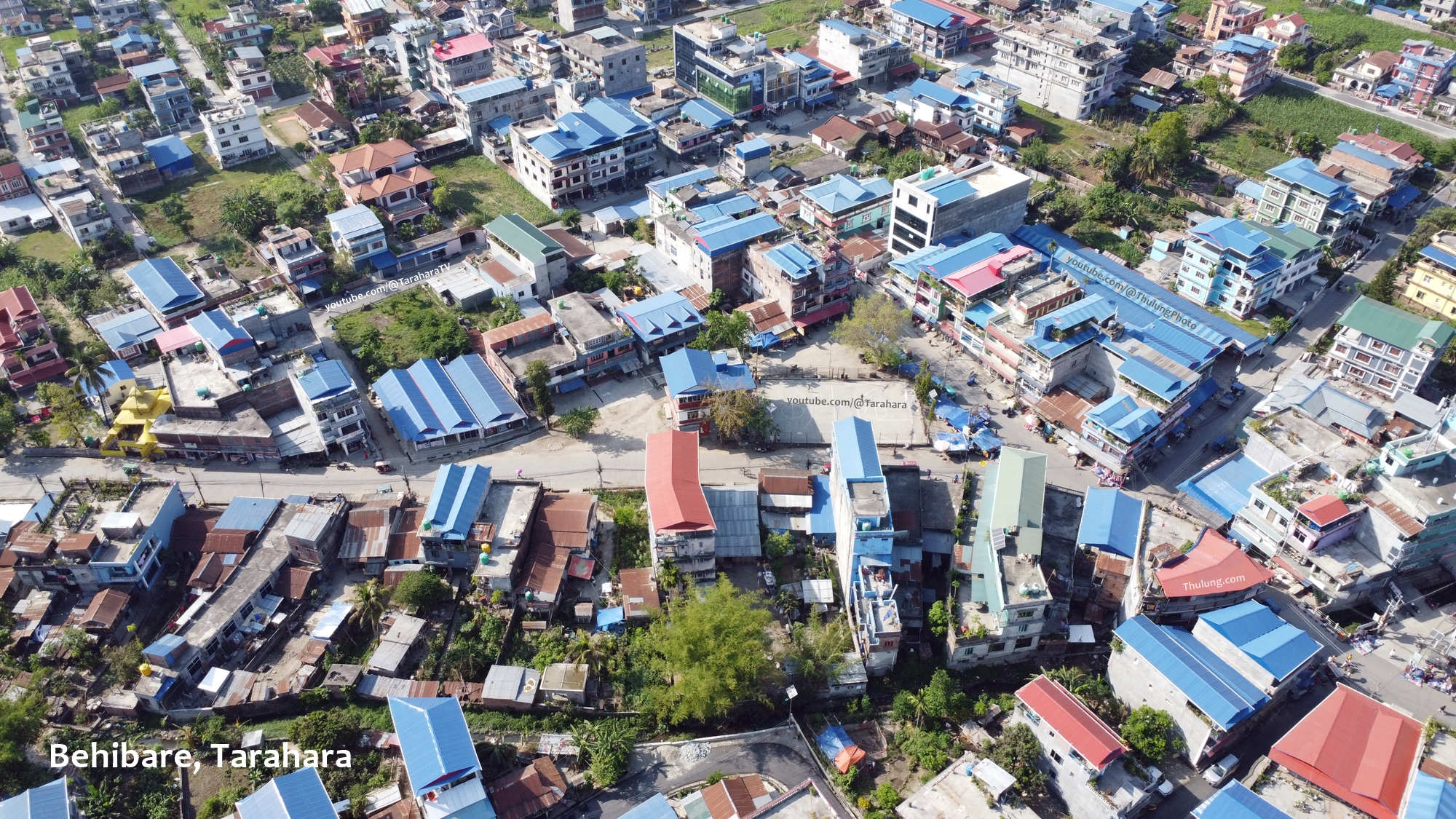
Behibare aerial shot

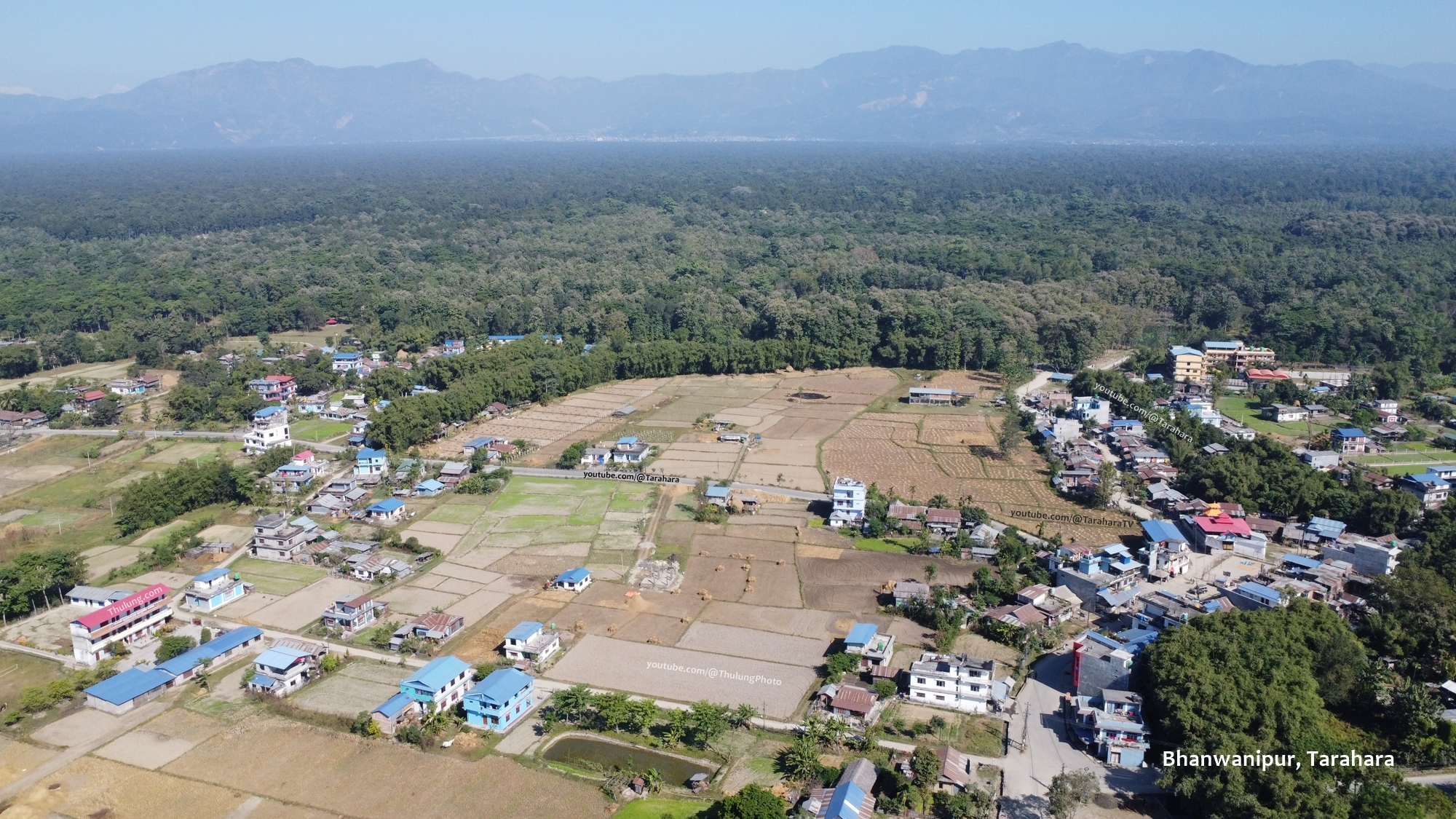
Aerial view of Bhawanipur

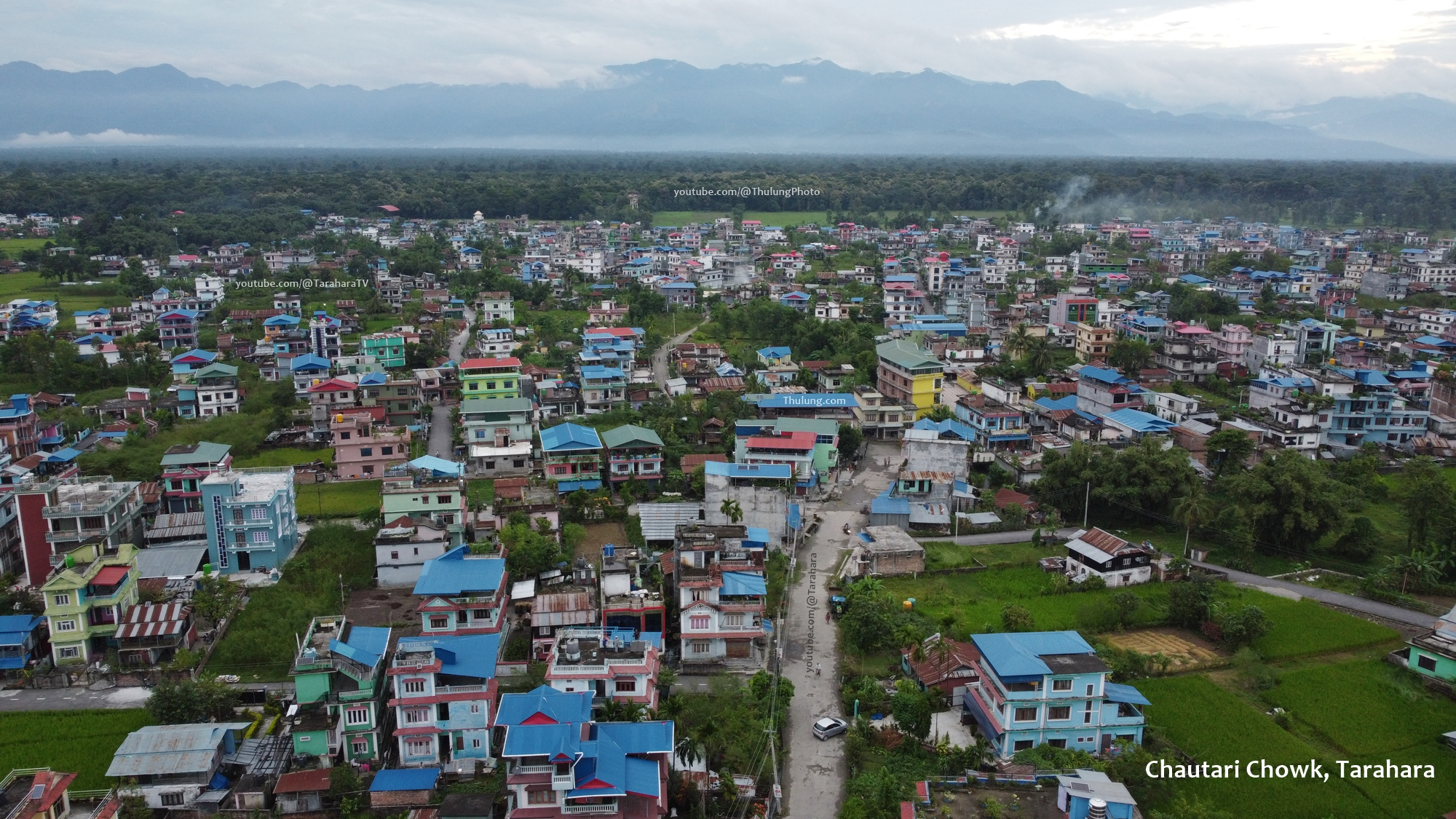
Chautari Chowk, Tarahara

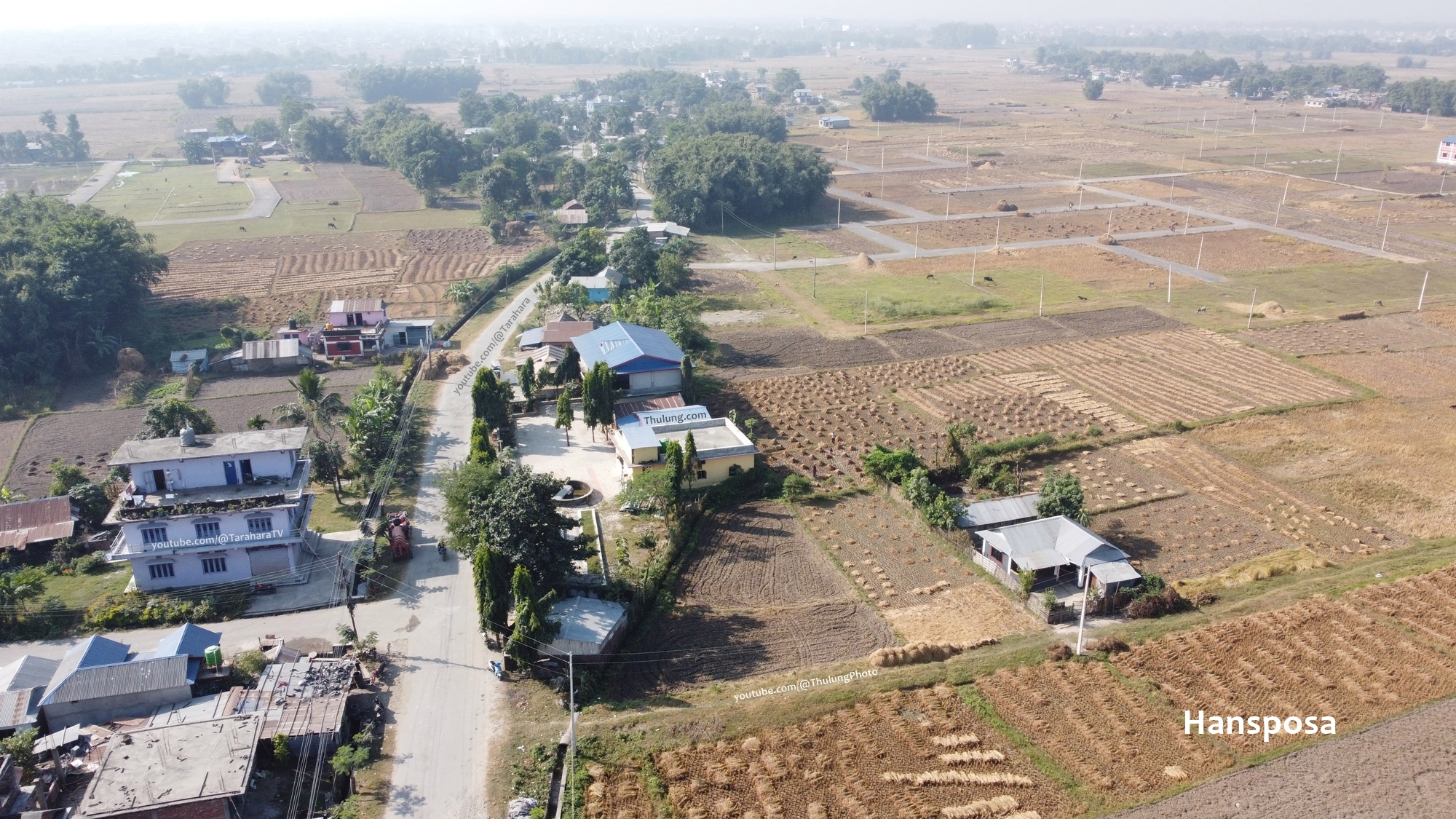
Hansposa drone view

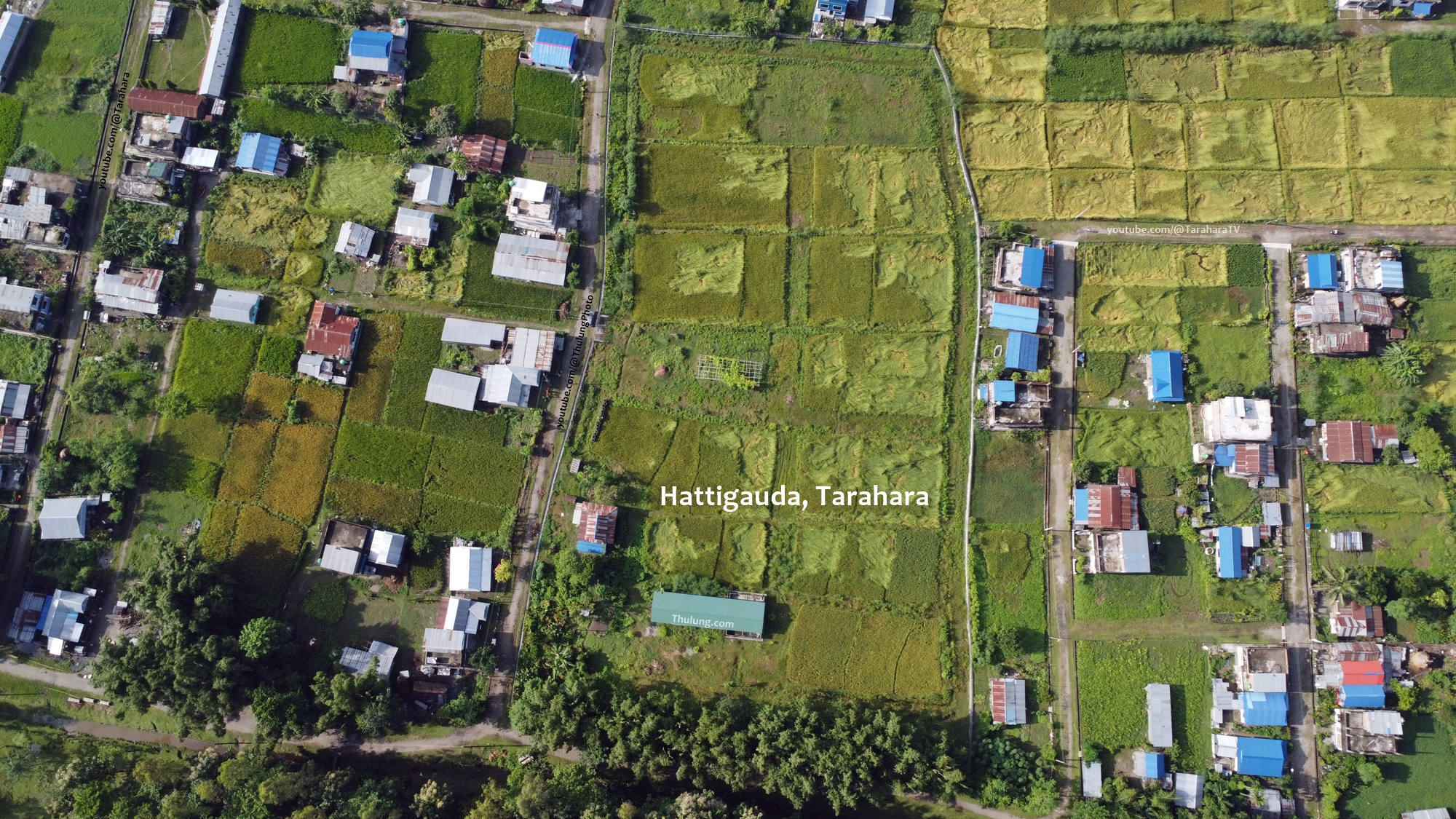
Hattigauda, Tarahara

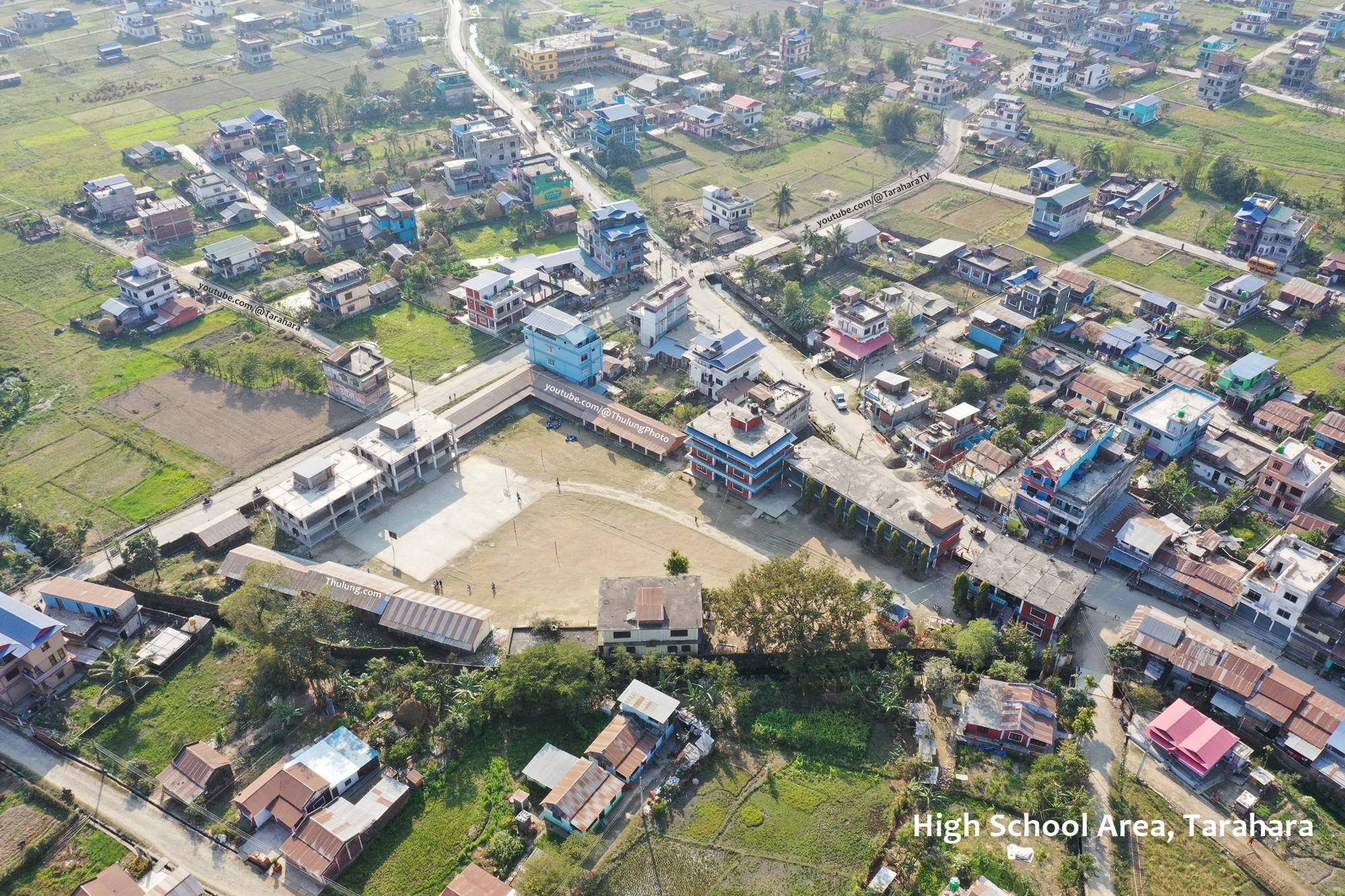
High school area/suburb, Tarahara

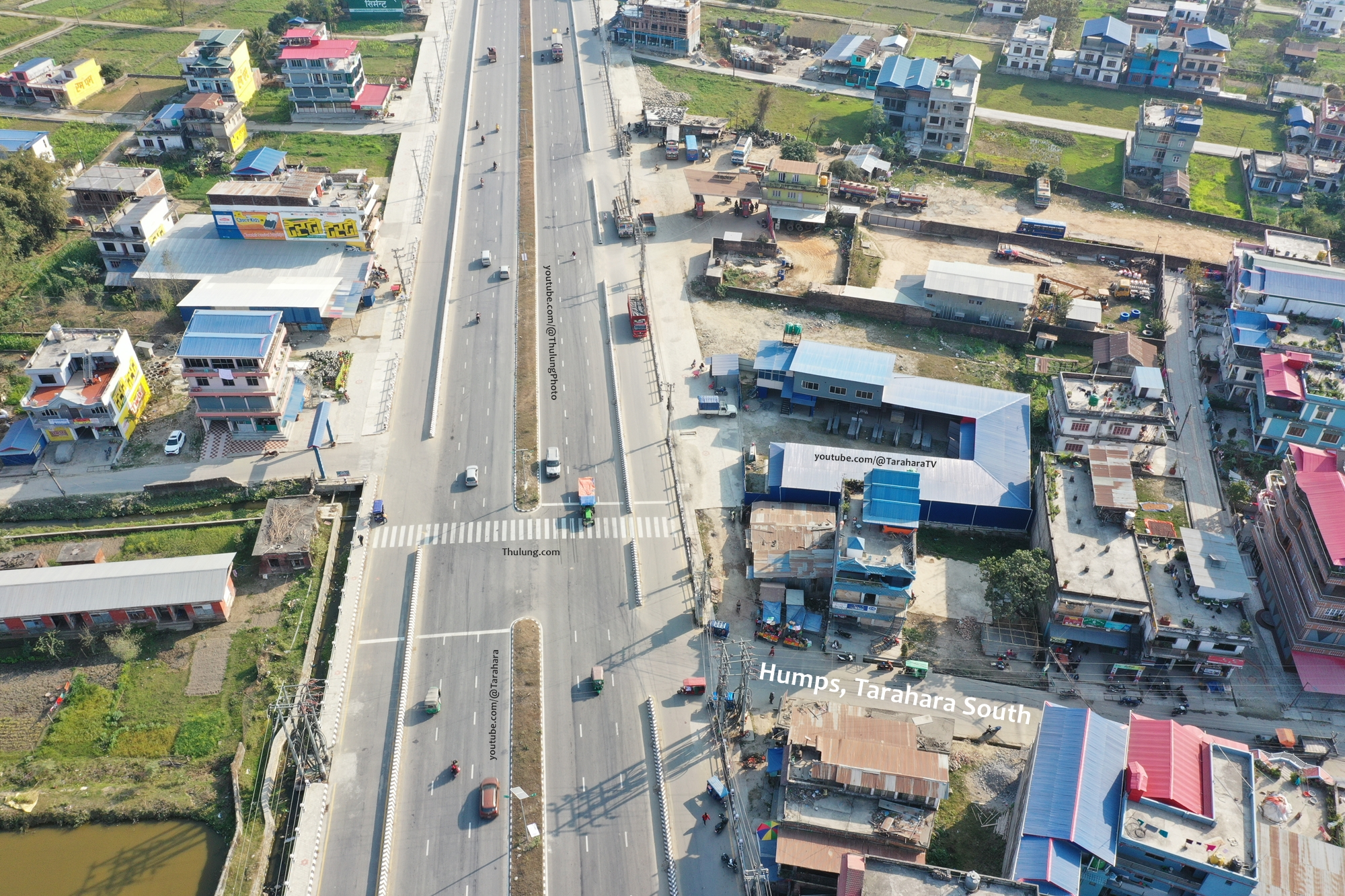
Humps, Tarahara south

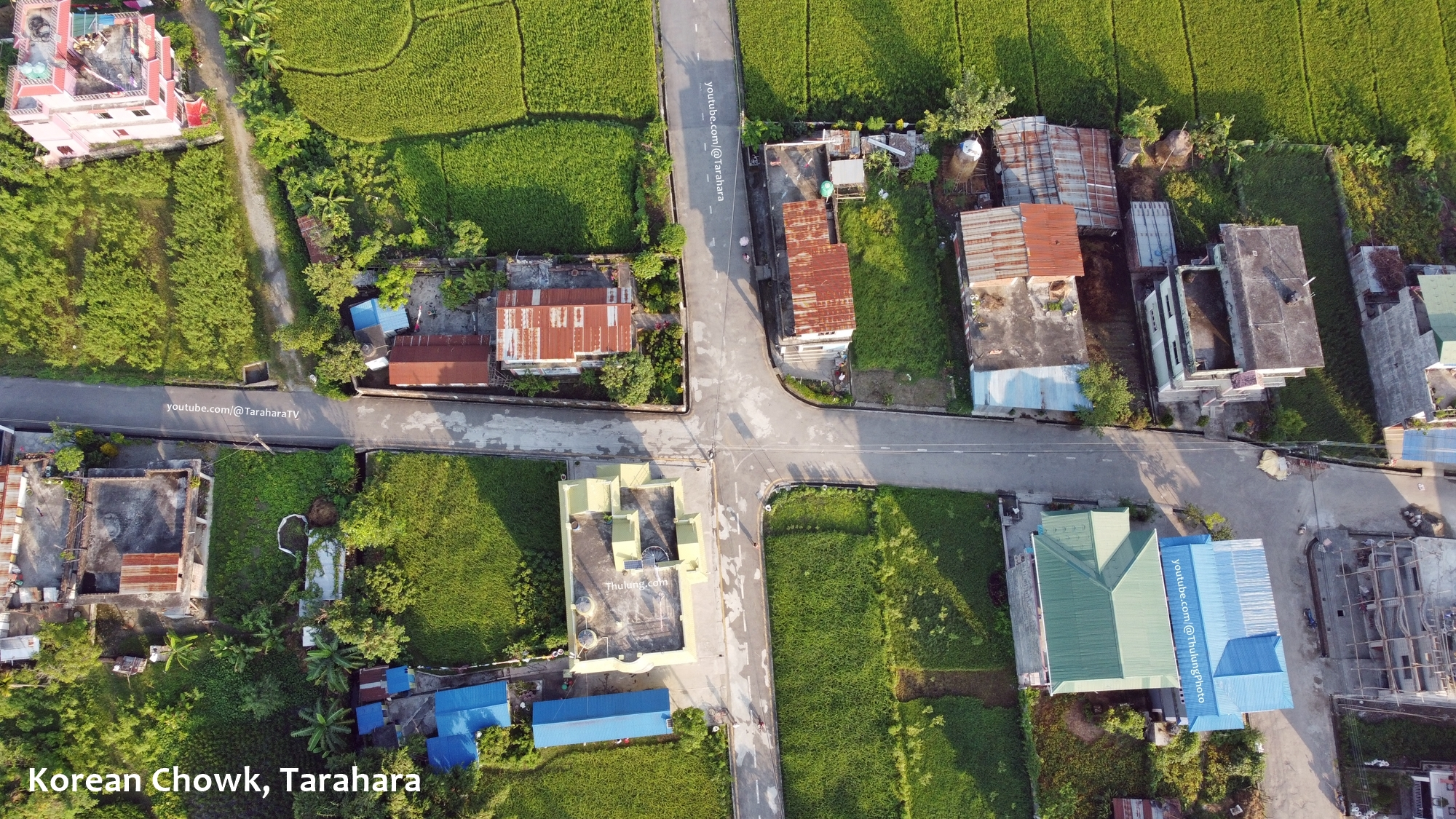
Korean Chowk, Tarahara

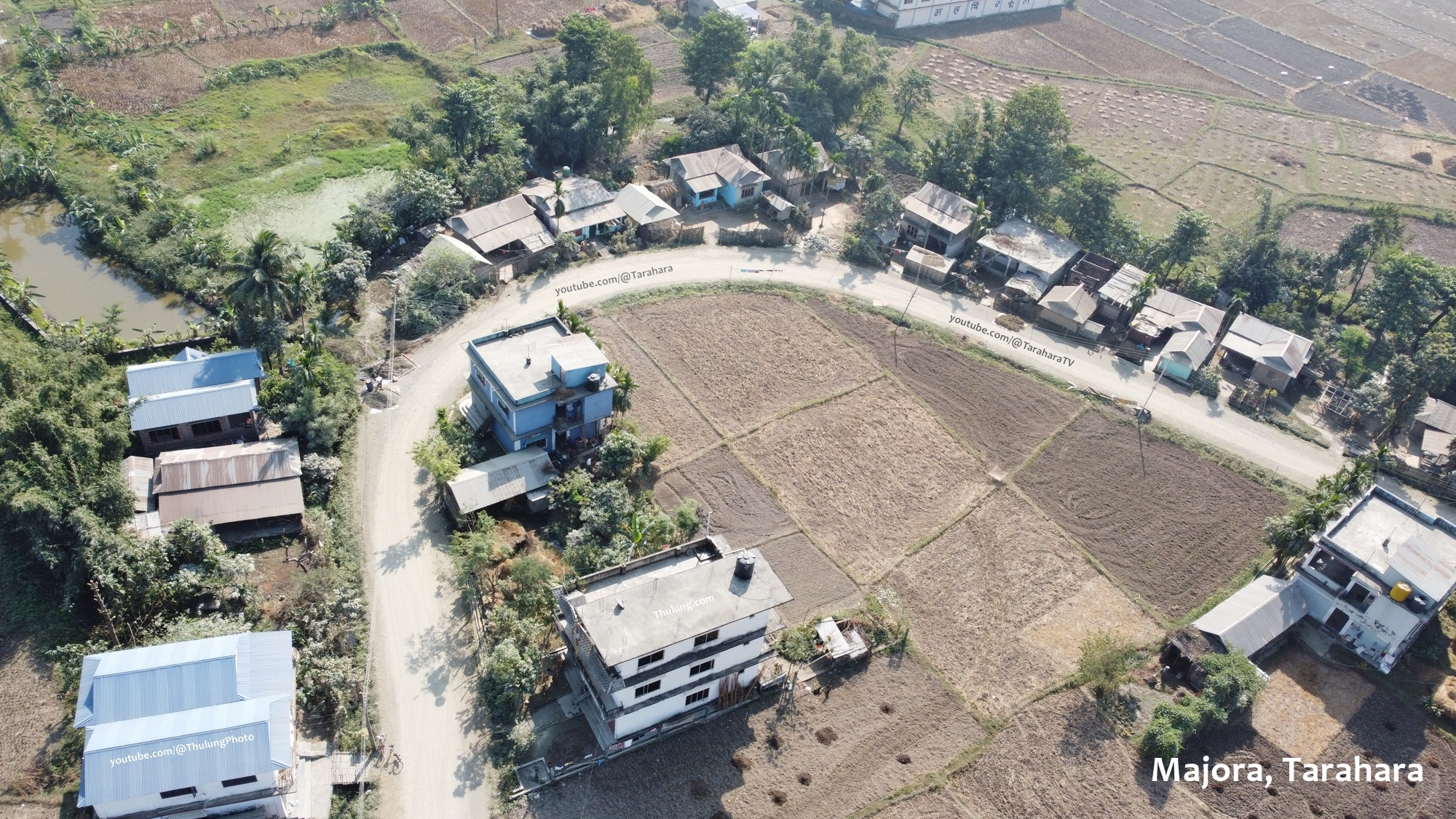
Majora, Tarahara south west

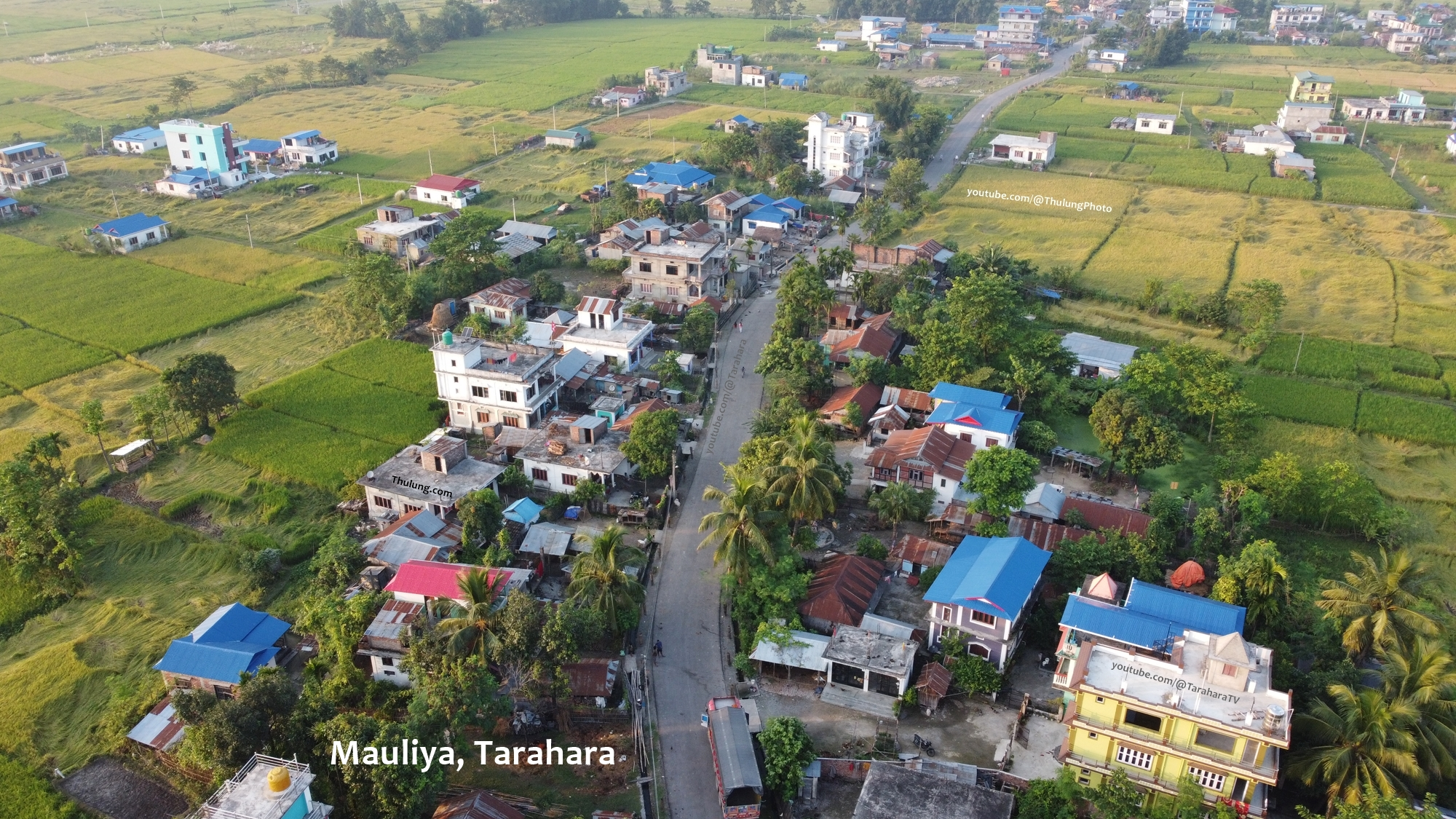
Mauliya, Tarahara

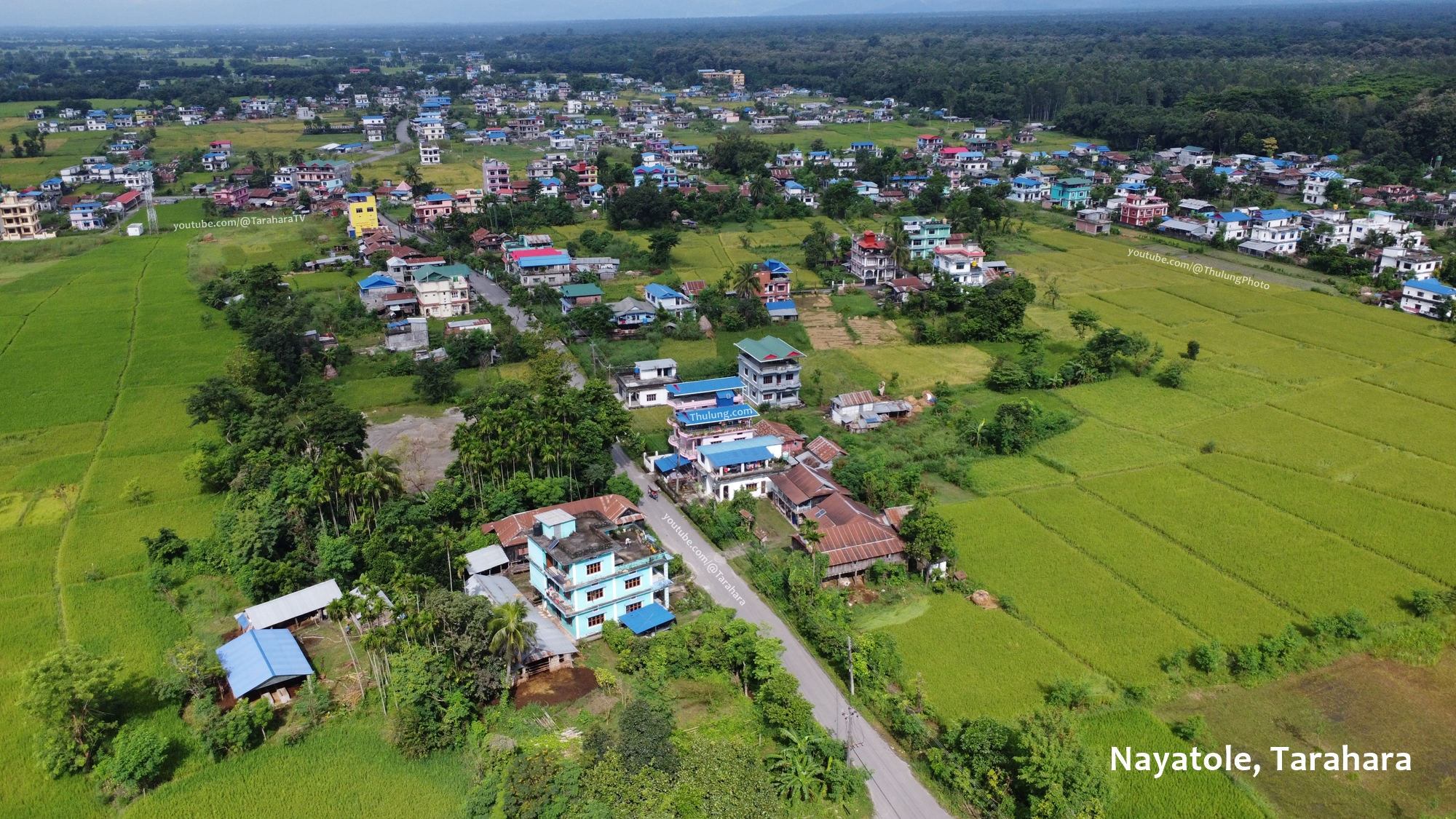
Nayatole, Tarahara

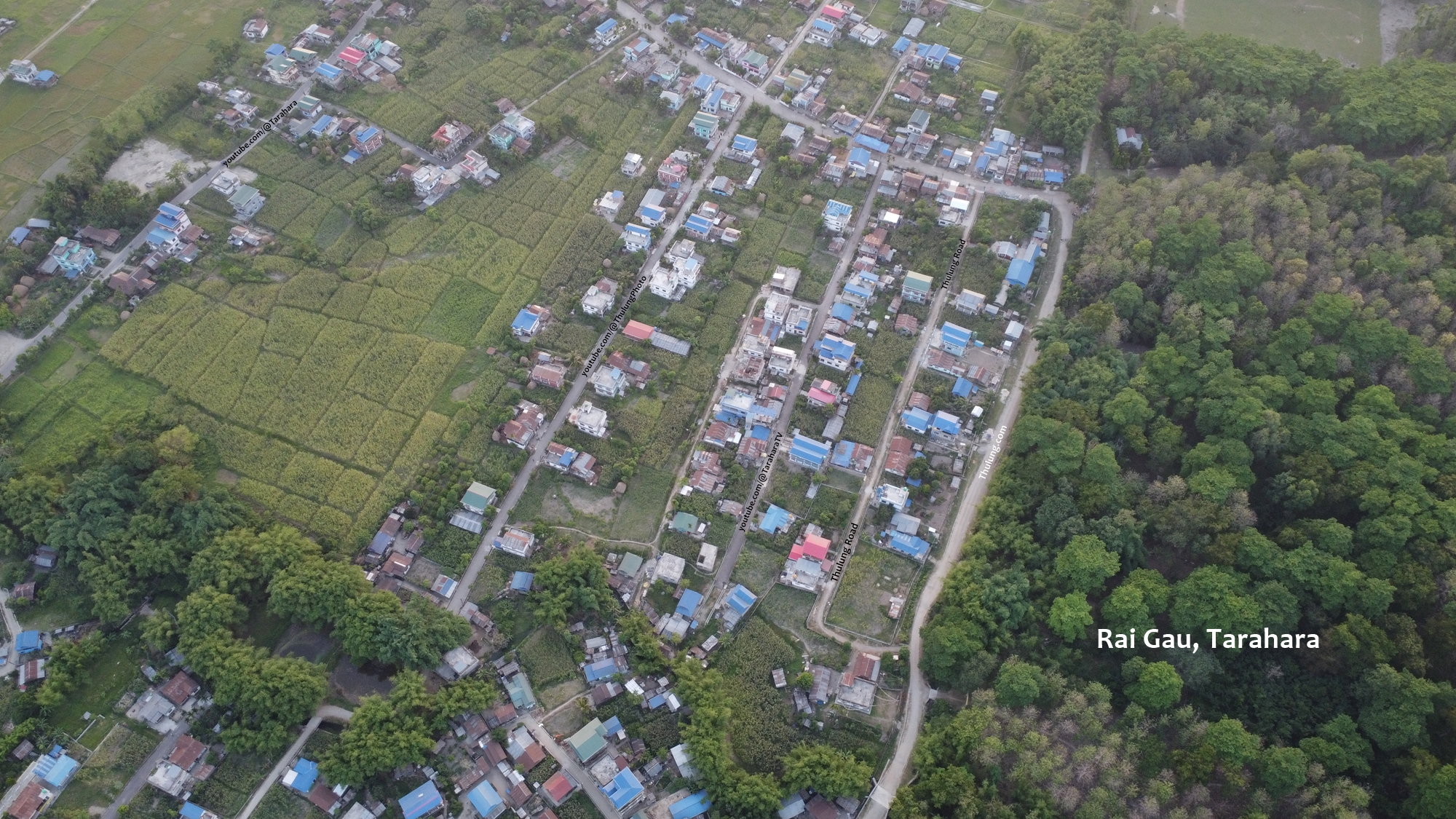
Rai Gau, Tarahara

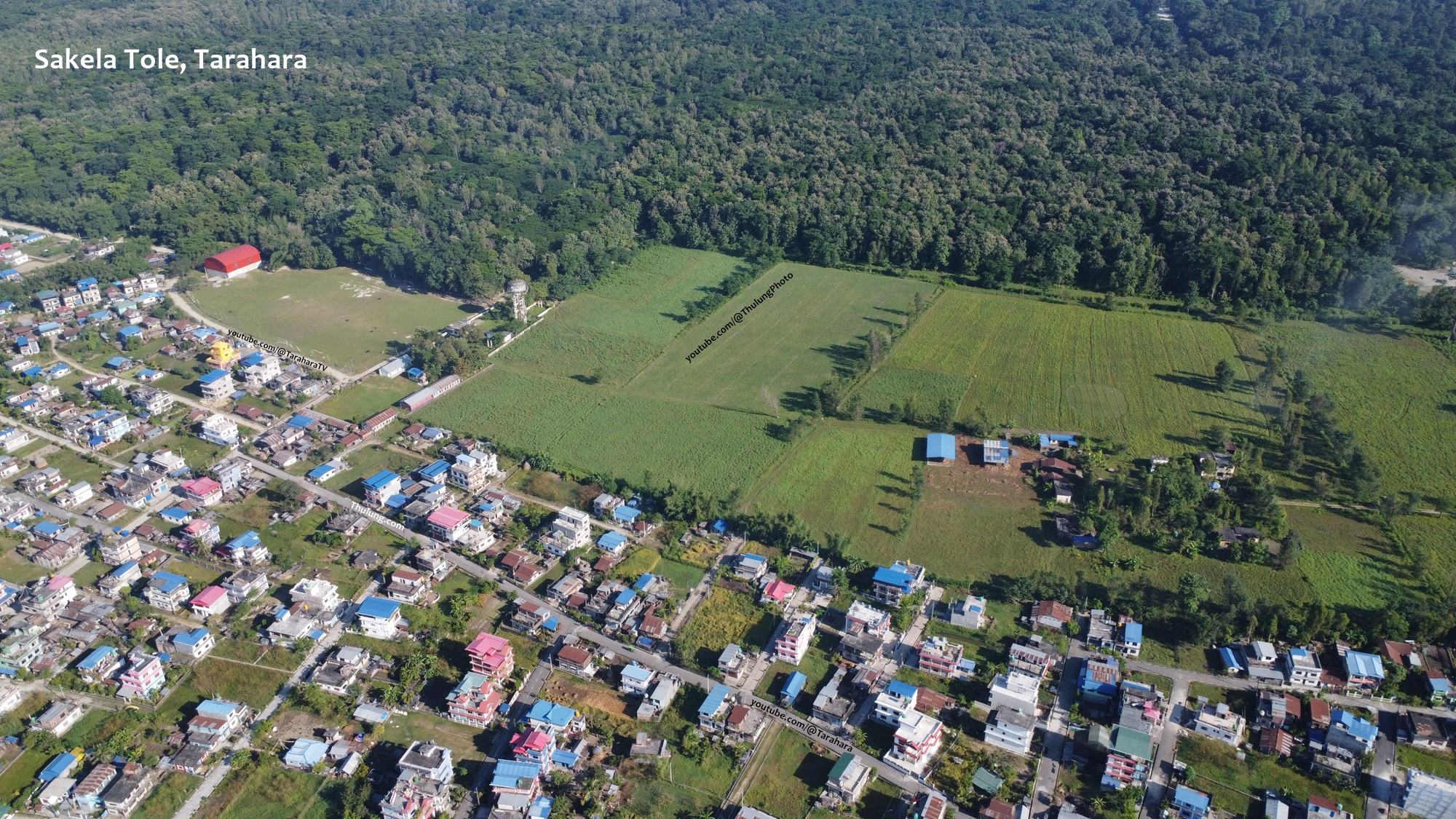
Sakela Tole, Tarahara

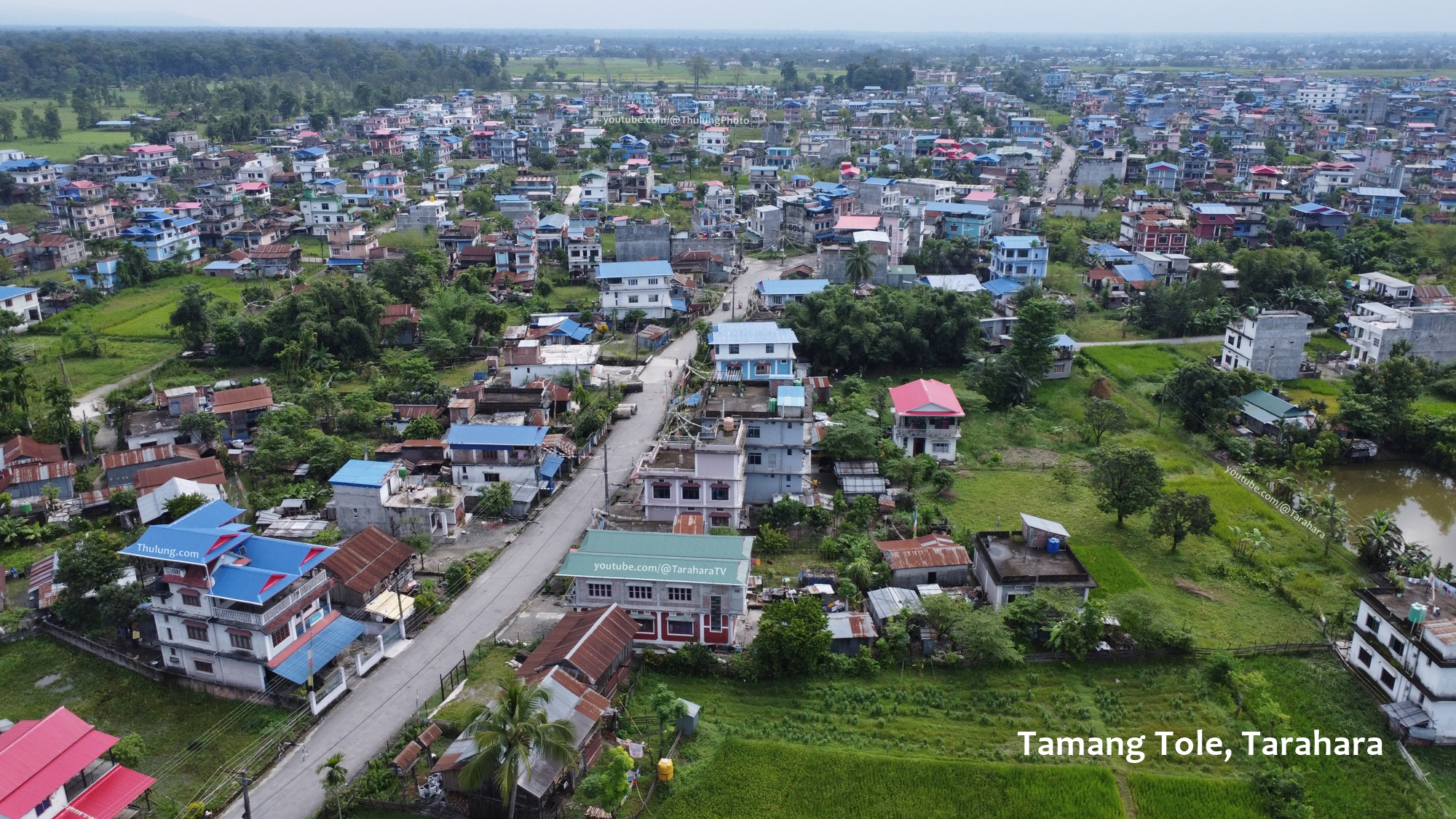
Tamang Tole, Tarahara

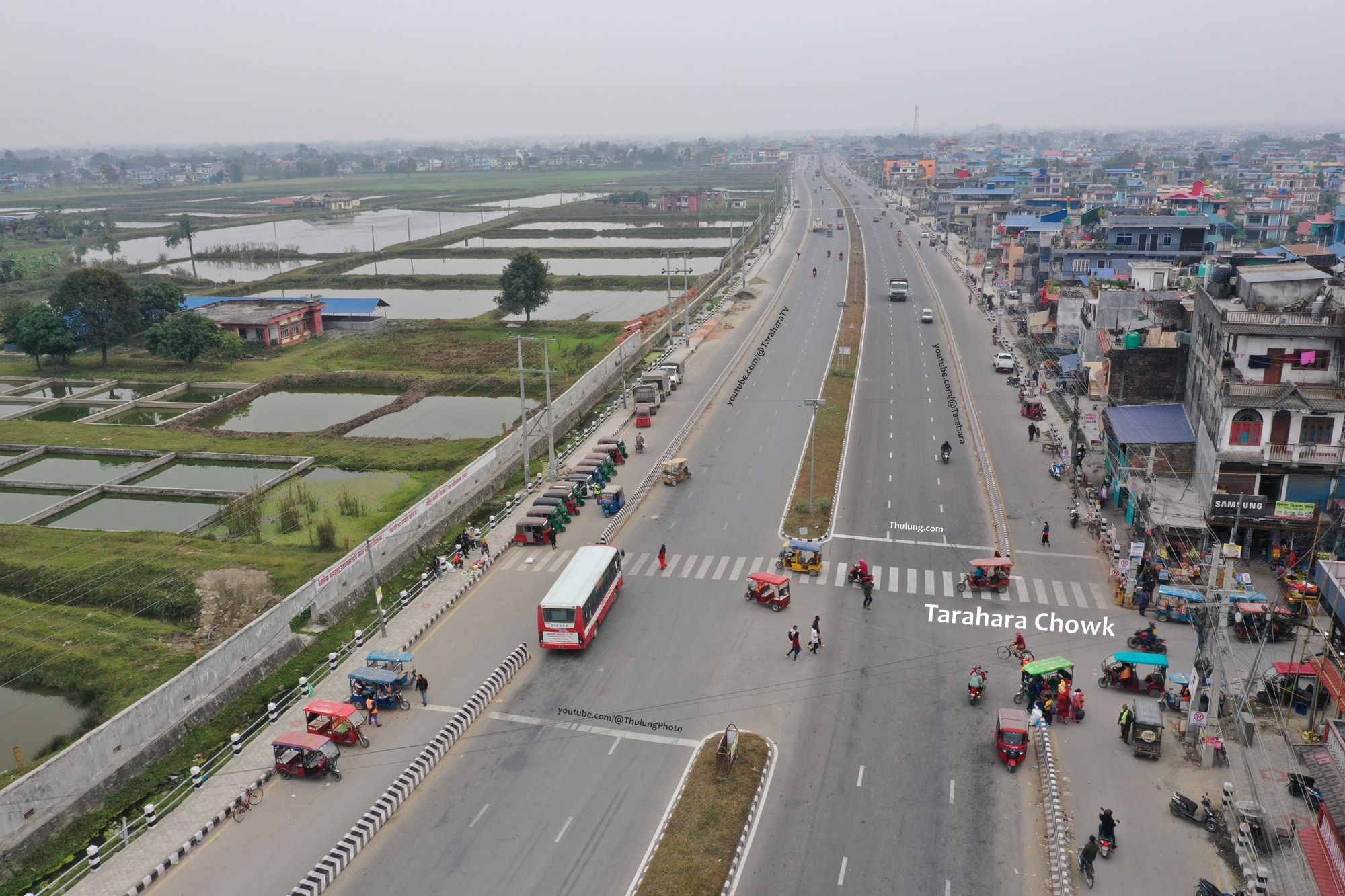
Tarahara Chowk / Tarahara City Centre / CBD

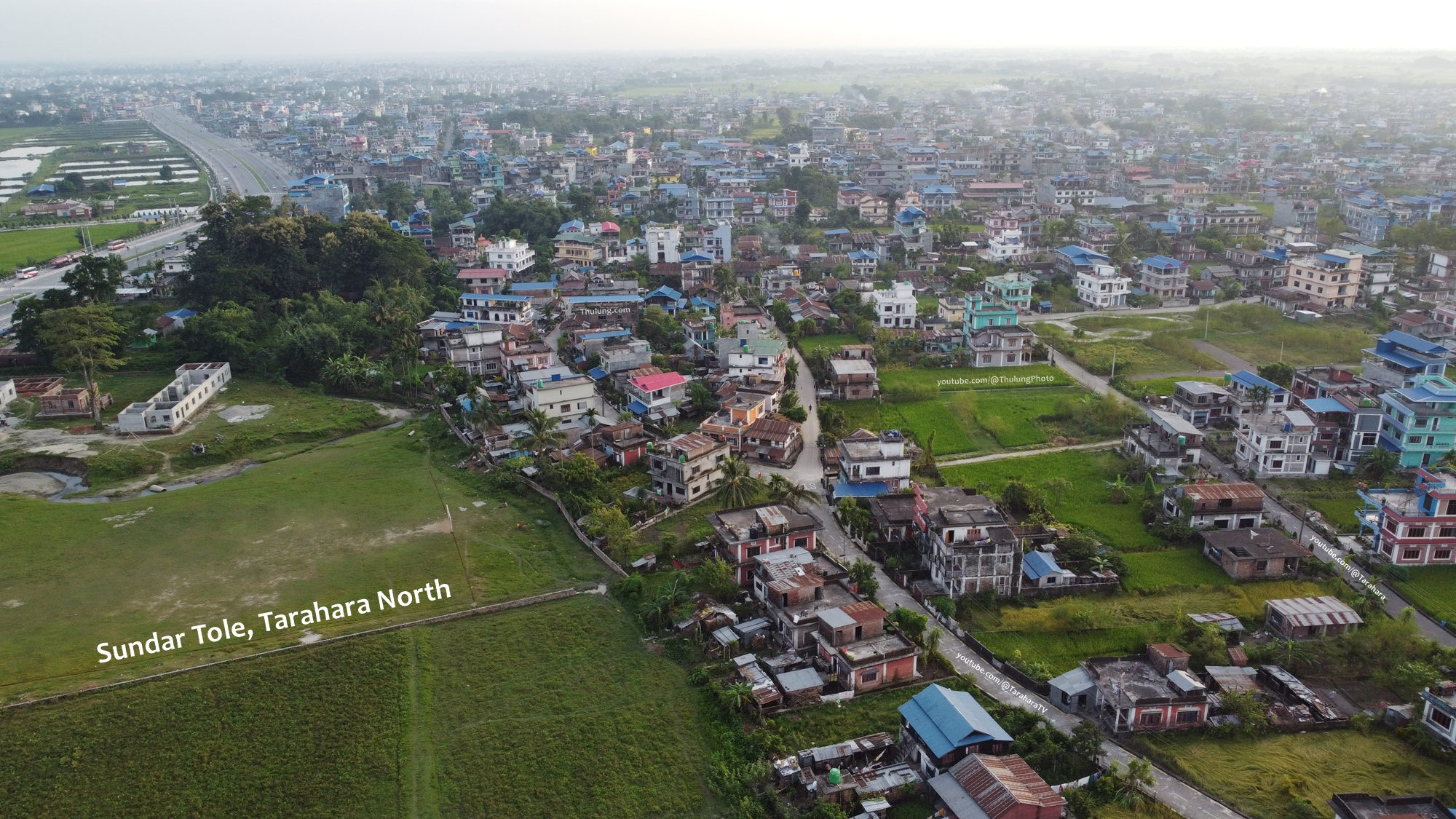
Sundar Tole, Tarahara north

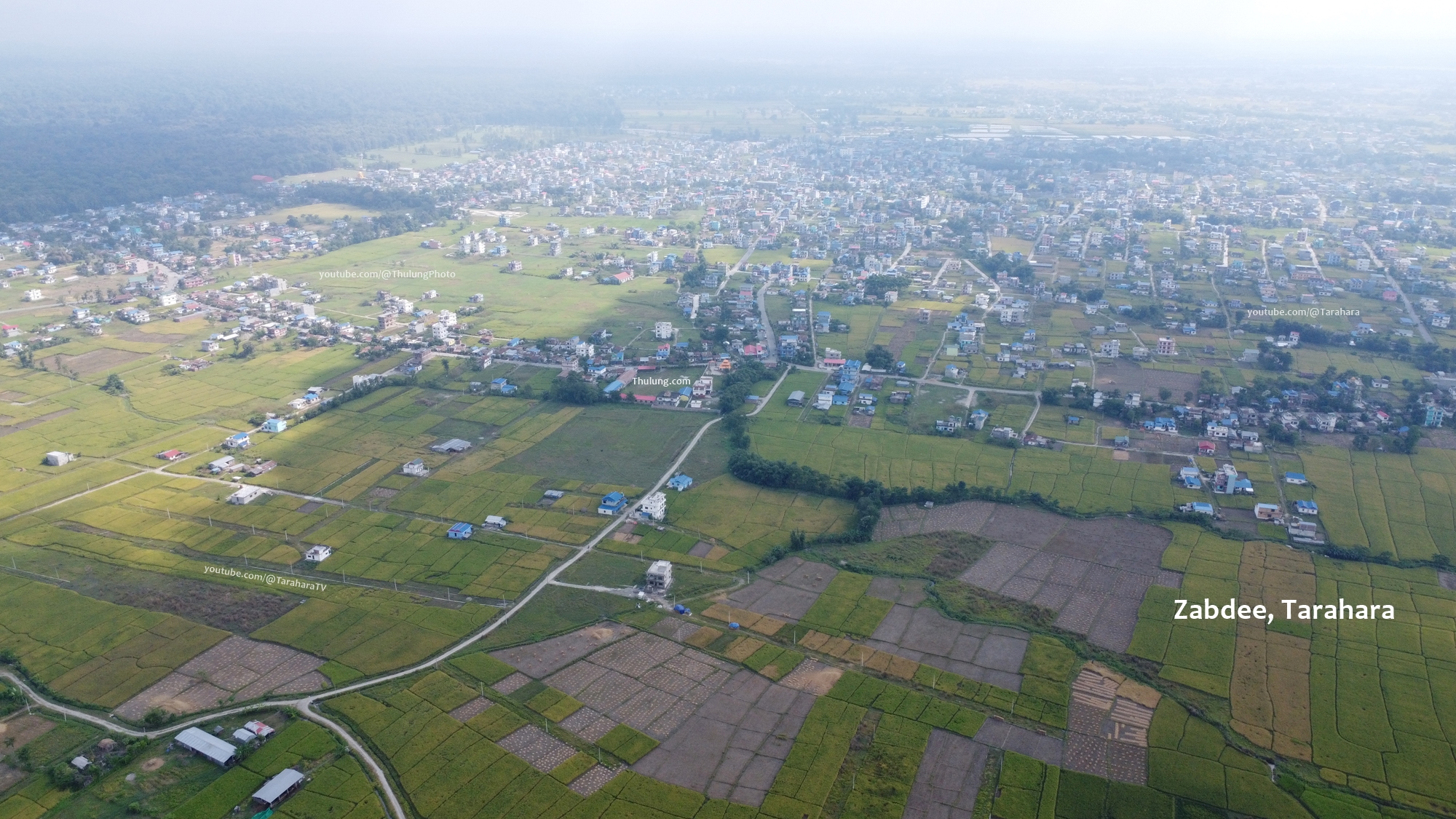
Zabdee, Tarahara west
