= Charkose Jhadi =

Largest and the most dense forest in Nepal

- Location within Nepal
- Location: Itahari and Dharan, Nepal
- Nearest city: Itahari
- Coordinates: 26°43′42″N 87°22′45″E
- Length: 35 km (22 mi)
- Width: 12 km (7.5 mi)
- Area: 19,845 acres (80.31 km^{2})
- Elevation: 64 m (210 ft)
- Governing body: Ministry of Forests and Environment

Charkose Jhadi (or in Nepali, चार कोशे झाडी) is the largest and the most dense forest in Nepal. It lies in Koshi district between Tarahara and Dharan in eastern Nepal. Koshi Highway runs through Charkose Jhadi linking Tarahara and Dharan. It is about 40 km (25 mi) in length from Madhumalla in the east to Bharaul in the west.
