= Dangihat =

Dangihat डाँगीहाट
- Village development committee
- Location in Nepal
- Coordinates: 26.63°N 87.45°E
- Country: Nepal
- Zone: Koshi Zone
- District: Morang District

Population (1991)
  - Total: 15,639
- Time zone: UTC+5:45 (Nepal Time)

Dangihat was a village development committee in Morang District in the Koshi Zone of south-eastern Nepal. It lies west of Bahuni. It consisted of 9 wards. People of different castes lived here, mainly Brahmin, Chhetri, Khawas, Rai, Limbu, and Rajbanshi. At the time of the 1991 Nepal census it had a population of 15,639 people living in 2992 individual households.
