= Siraha =

Siraha सिरहा
- Municipality (नगरपालिका)
- Interactive map of Siraha
- Location of Siraha in Nepal
- Coordinates: 26°39′10″N 86°12′27″E
- Country: Nepal
- Province: Madhesh
- Region: Mithila
- District: Siraha
- Municipality Formation: 2053 BS

Government
  - Mayor: Arman Siddiqui (independent)
  - Deputy Mayor: Babita Kumari Sah (NCP)
- Elevation: 80 m (260 ft)

Population (2022)
  - Total: 96,543
  - Ethnicities: Hindu Muslim Buddhist
- Time zone: UTC+5:45 (NST)
- Postal code: 56500
- Area code: 033
- Website: sirahamun.gov.np/en

Siraha (Maithili: सिराहा, sirāhā) is the headquarters and municipality of Siraha District, a part of Madhesh Province, Nepal. Siraha had a population of 28,442 according to the census of 2011. and a population of 82,531 as of 2015. The current population of Siraha municipality as of census 2022, is 96,543. It has a male population of 47,306 and female population of 49,237. The present mayor of Siraha Municipality is Arman Siddiqui and deputy mayor is Babita Kumari Sah. Both assumed office on 25 May 2022. His predecessor mayor was Asheswor Yadav and the deputy mayor was Namita Yadav. Both assumed office on 25 September 2017 and their last working day was on 24 May 2022. The town is at 80 metres (260 ft) altitude, 29 kilometres (18 mi) ESE of Janakpur.

== Siraha municipality ==
Siraha municipality is in the Siraha district of Madhesh Province. It is one of the oldest municipalities among the 58 municipalities. When dividing Nepal into 34 districts, Siraha was in Saptadi district. Siraha municipality was established in 2053 (BS) composed of 5 VDCs namely Siraha, Maknaha, Manpur, Basbitta and Thangi, which was divided into 9 wards. Ward numbers 1, 2, 7, and 8 were made from Maknaha VDC; 3, 4, and 5 were made from Manpur; number 6 was made from Basbitta, and number 9 was made from Thangi VDC. Siraha is also a headquarters of Siraha district. It is around 20 KM south from the Mahendra Highway.

== Merged VDC ==
The Siraha municipality is composed of total 22 wards, including Laxminya, Sanhaitha, Lagdigadiyani, Lagdigoth, Hakpara. All these were villages Development Committee consisting of 9 wards in each VDC, and all were merged to Siraha municipality making total 22 wards. Its area is 94.20 km^{2} and population as of 2015 was 82,531. Its headquarters is the old Siraha municipality office. Its neighbours to the north are Bishnupur and Arnama Gaupalika, to the south is Bihar (India) to the west is Dhanusha District, and to the east are Aurhi and Arnama Gaupalika. The population consists of Hindus, Muslims, and Buddhists, and the main languages are Nepali, Maithali, Hindi, and Urdu.

== Infrastructure ==
Janakpur Airport is the nearest airport to the district, roughly 29 km away from various locations. Janakpur Airport operates daily flights between Janakpur and Kathmandu.

Nearby towns Laukaha in India and Thadi in Nepal are a part of one of the agreed routes for mutual trade between India and Nepal. The Nepali government has set up a dedicated customs office in the town, and the government of India has set up a land customs station with a superintendent level officer.

Nearby to the town is Lahan, Nepal where there is a notable ophthalmology hospital, the Sagarmatha Choudhary Eye Hospital.

== Transportation ==
The district through its border town Thadi town is also connected to Laukaha Bazar railway station which is located in adjacent Indian town of Laukaha. The 268 km (167 mi) long Jainagar-Darbhanga-Narkatiaganj line and Sakri-Laukaha Bazar-Nirmali line were converted from metre to broad gauge in 2011–2012.

Laukaha is well connected to NH 57 via Khutauna to Phulparas. The approximate distance from Laukaha to Phulparas is 30km.

== Media ==
- Siraha City Facebook.com/Sirahacity
- Salhesh Times Facebook.com/salheshtimes
- Apan Dainik Facebook.com/Apandainik
