= India–Nepal border =

International boundary in South Asia

India-Nepal border
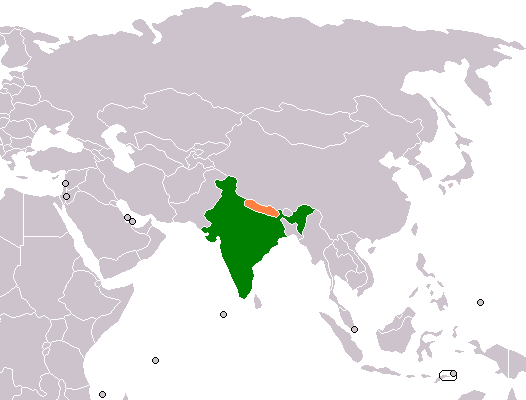
- Map of Nepal, with India to the south

Characteristics
- Entities: India; Nepal
- Length: 1,751 kilometres (1,088 mi)

History
- Established: 1816; Treaty of Sugauli between Nepal and British Raj
- Current shape: 15 August 1947; Independence of India from the British Raj
- Treaties: 1950 Indo-Nepal Treaty of Peace and Friendship

The India–Nepal border is an open international boundary running between the countries of India and Nepal. The 1,751 km (1,088.02 mi) long border includes the Himalayan territories as well as Indo-Gangetic Plain of the subcontinent. The current border was delimited after the Sugauli treaty of 1816 between Nepal and the British Raj. Following Indian independence, the prevailing border was recognised as the international border between the Kingdom of Nepal and the Dominion of India.

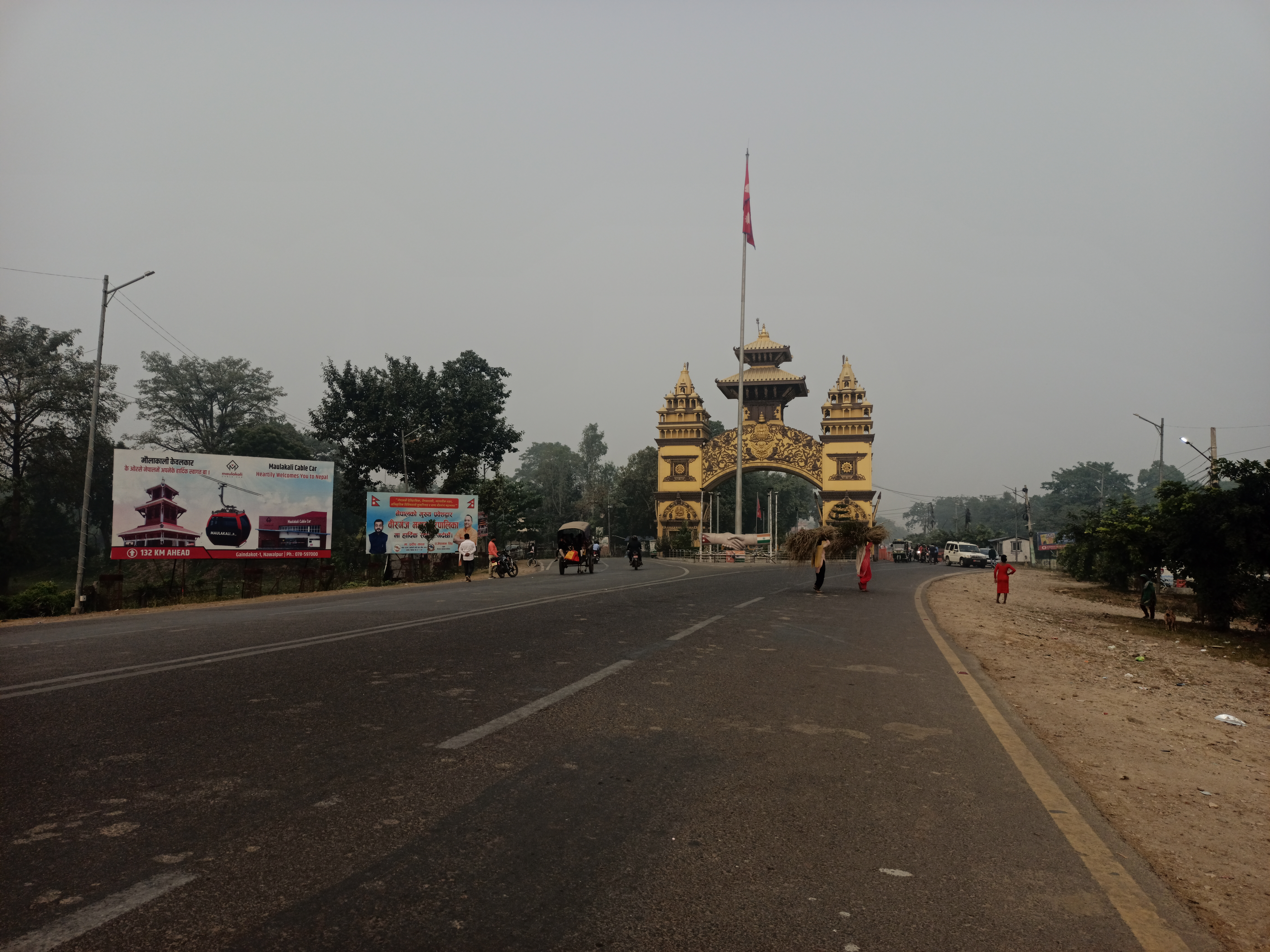
Shankharacharya Gate, Birgunj, is main entry Point of Nepal from north Bihar, India (also known as the 'Gateway of Nepal')

== Description ==
The border starts in the west at the western tripoint with China near the Limpiyadhura. It then proceeds to the south-west through the Himalayas, the Sivalik Hills and then the Gangetic plain, initially overland and then utilising the Mahakali River. Just east of Majhola it turns to the south-east and proceeds in that direction overland, occasionally utilising various rivers and hill crests. North-west of Islampur the border turns to the north-east and proceeds overland to the eastern Chinese tripoint.

== History ==
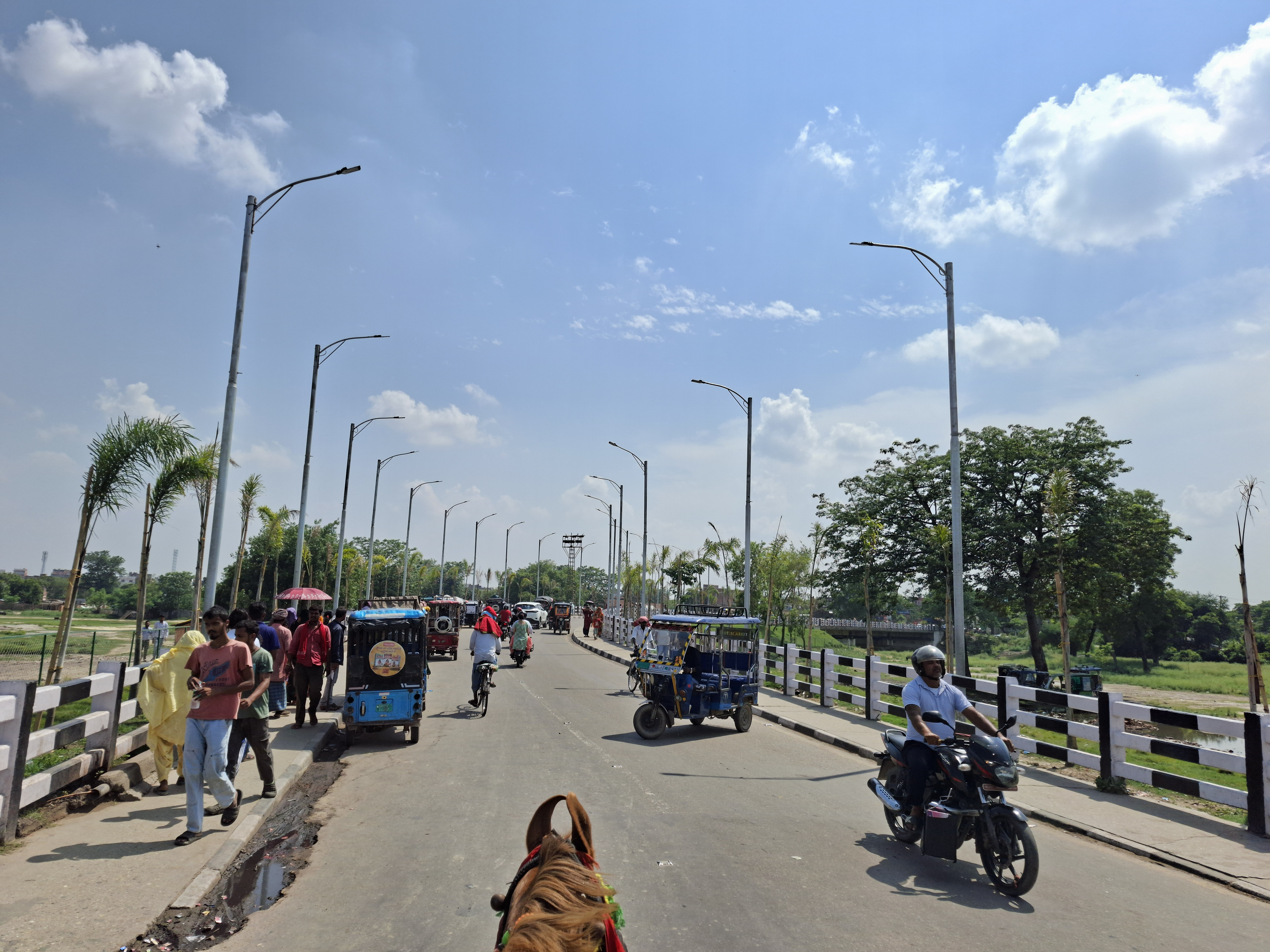
India–Nepal Friendship Bridge (Raxaul–Birgunj Border), May 2026

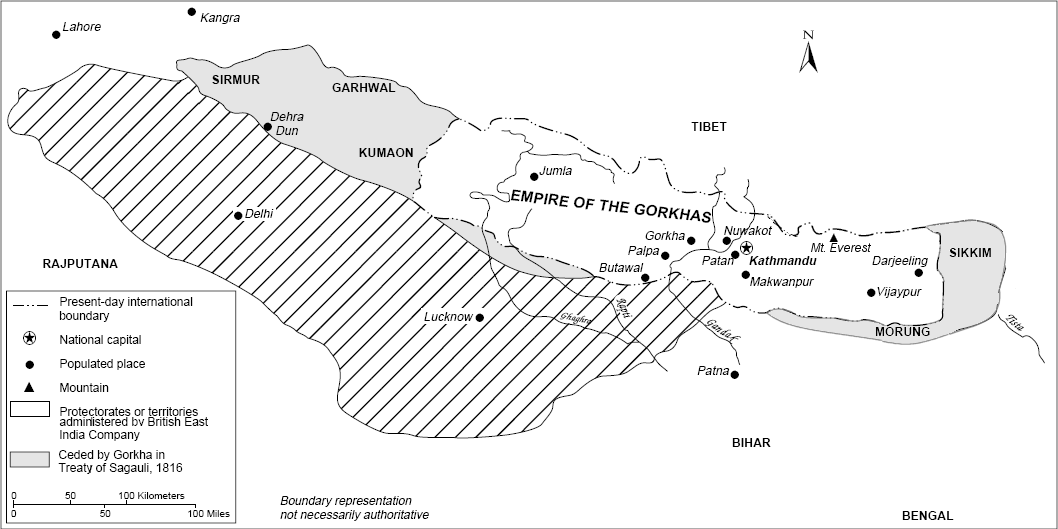
Areas ceded by Nepal as part of the Treaty of Sugauli

The border region has historically existed at the edge of various Indian and Nepali kingdoms. It took its modern shape during the period of British India which began in the 17th century. While the Gorkhalis fought the Kirati people to annex their territory in the late 18th century (notably in 1768), the Gorkha Kingdom launched an expansion drive, bringing them into conflict with the British and resulting in the Anglo-Nepalese War (1814–16). The Kingdom of Nepal was defeated and was forced to sign the Treaty of Sugauli by the British East India Company (EIC), while ceding large areas of land to Britain, effectively creating the modern India-Nepal boundary. Finding the Terai region difficult to manage, the British returned parts of it to Nepal in 1816.

India gained independence from the United Kingdom in 1947, and three years later it signed a friendship treaty with Nepal, by which both countries agreed to respect the territorial integrity of the other. Since then relations have largely been cordial, though a number of border disputes remain. There have also been occasional blockades on the border at times of tension, for example in 1987 and 2015.

Communities living in India and Nepal close to the Indo-Nepal border have usually shared old, customary ties of kinship and resource access with communities across the border, such as along the western part of the Indo-Nepal border, in the Mahakali valley.

== Border disputes ==
There are two existing territorial disputes between India and Nepal, over the Kalapani territory, a 35-square-kilometre (14 sq mi) area at the India–Nepal–China trijunction in the Uttarakhand state of India, and the Susta territory, a 20-square-kilometre (7.7 sq mi)–140-square-kilometre (54 sq mi) area in Southern Nepal.

== Border crossings ==
=== ICP ===
There are several major border crossings that the Indian Integrated Check Posts (ICP) use for processing cargo customs and immigration entry for citizens of third countries. These are, from west to east subcategorised by the states of India:

- Uttarakhand:
  - Banbasa in Champawat district - Dodhara Chandani in Kanchanpur District, Sudurpashchim Province, Nepal. ICP established in 2023.
  - Planned:
    - Pithoragarh-Dasharathchanda
- Uttar Pradesh:
  - Rupaidiha in Bahraich district - Nepalganj in Banke District, Nepal. ICP established in 2022.
  - Sonauli in Maharajganj district - Belahia, Siddharthanagar in Rupandehi District, Nepal. ICP established in 2023.
- Bihar:

ICP Birgunj, Nepal

  - Raxaul in East Champaran district - Birgunj, Nepal (also known as the 'Gateway of Nepal'). ICP Raxaul was established in 2018.
  - Bhitthamore in Sitamarhi district - Malibara, Jaleshwar in Mahottari District, Nepal.
  - Jogbani in Araria district - Biratnagar, Nepal. ICP established in 2020.
  - Planned:
    - Bairia-Gauriganj
    - Salgori-Kechna
- West Bengal
  - Panitanki in Darjeeling district - Kakarbhitta, Nepal.
  - Planned:
    - Panitanki (Naxalbari)-Birtamode
  - Sukhia Pokhri-Pashupatinagar
- Sikkim
  - Panitanki in Darjeeling district - Kakarbhitta, Nepal.
    - Pelling (Dentam) - Panchami (Oyan)

=== Customs crossings ===
Since there are no fences along the border, there are several smaller official and unofficial border crossings. Smaller official border crossings, known as Chhoti Bhansar (Minor Customs) in the Nepali language, are as follows from west to east (by Indian state):

Uttarakhand

- Jhulaghat in Pithoragarh district - Mahakali in Baitadi District, Nepal

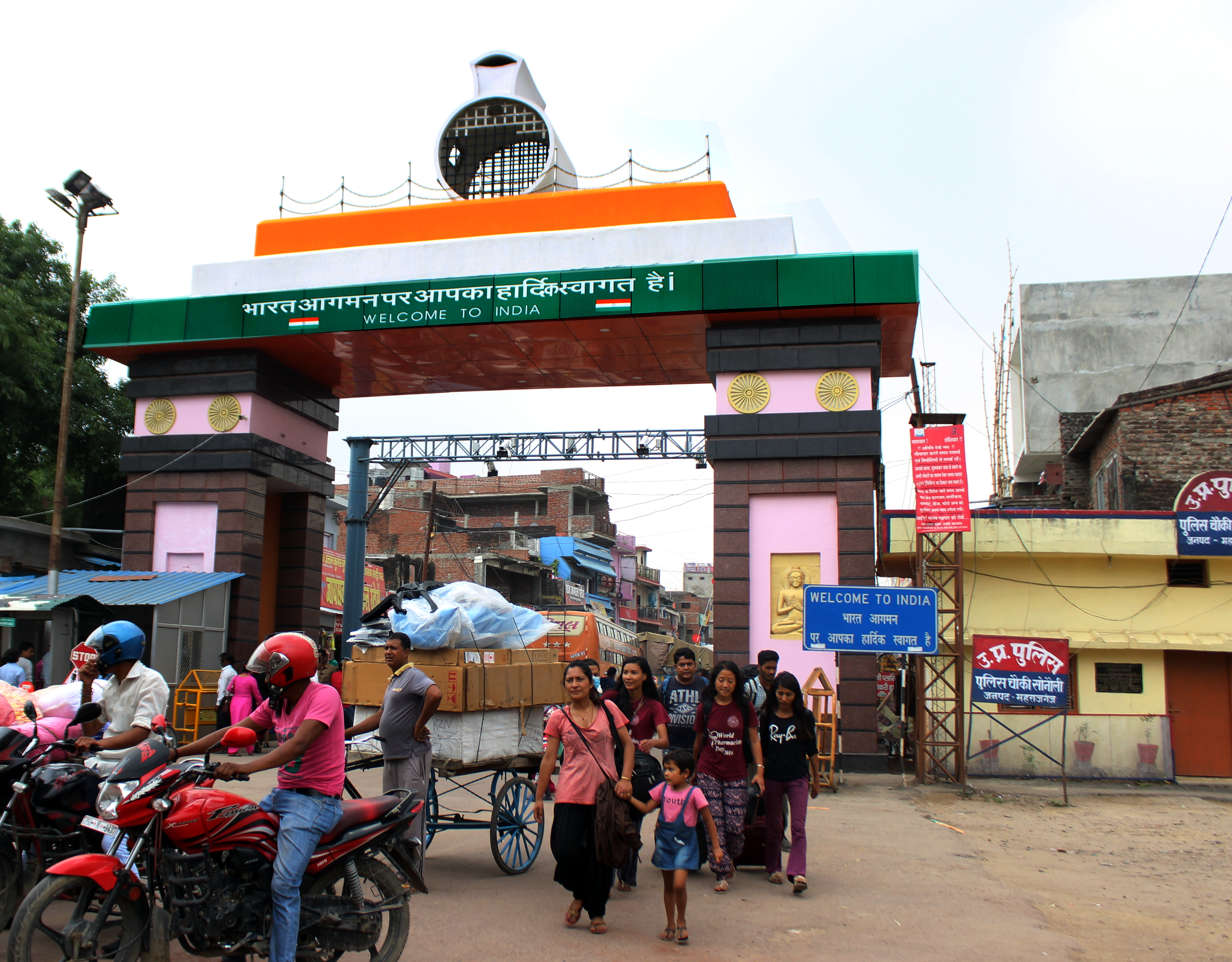
Border gate at Sonauli.

Uttar Pradesh

- Gauriphanta in Lakhimpur Kheri district - Dhangadi, Nepal.
- Murtiha in Lakhimpur Kheri district - Gulariya, Bardiya, Nepal.
- Tal Baghaura in Shravasti district - Laxmanpur, Nepal.
- Tulsipur in Balrampur district - Koilabas, Nepal.
- Barhani Bazar in Siddharthnagar district - Krishnanagar, Nepal

Bihar

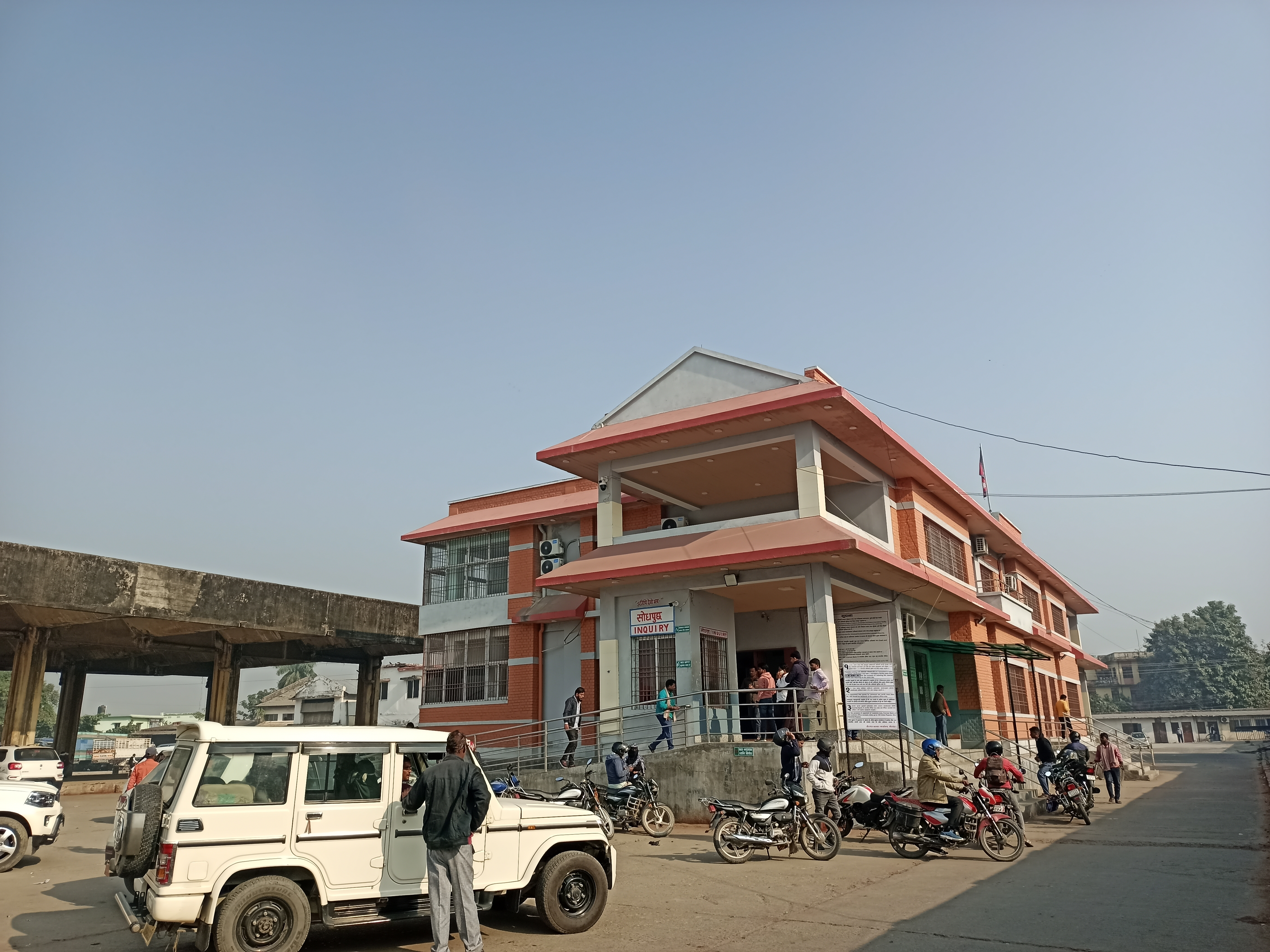
Vehicles Entry and Permit Customs Office in Birgunj Nepal, Border of Bihar, India

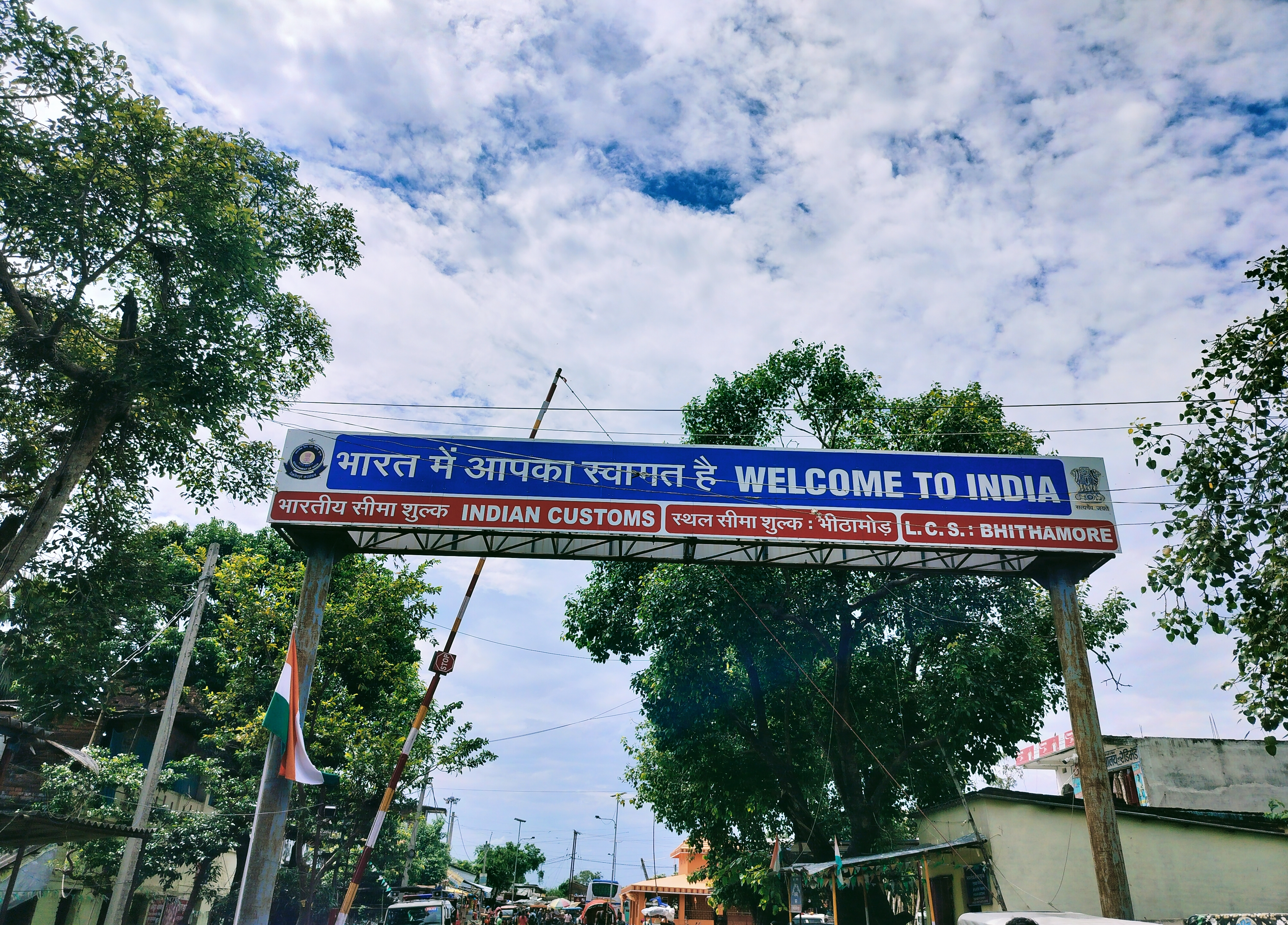
Border gate at Bhitthamore.

- Bhitthamore in Sitamarhi district, Bihar - Jaleshwor in Mahottari District, Nepal.
- Valmiki Nagar (Bhikhna Thori) in West Champaran district - Thori in Parsa District, Nepal.
- Bairgania in Sitamarhi district - Gaur in Rautahat District, Nepal.
- Sonbarsa in Sitamarhi district - Malangwa in Sarlahi District, Nepal.
- Pipraun in Madhubani district - Jatahi-Nagarain in Dhanusa District, Nepal.
- Jainagar in Madhubani district - Inarwa Phulbariya in Saptari District, Nepal.
- Laukaha in Madhubani district - Thadi in Bhagwanpur near Lahan Mulcipality in Siraha District of Nepal.
- Gandhi Chowk, Madhwapur in Madhubani district, India - Matihani in Mahottari district, Nepal
- Kunaolee (in Bhimnagar) in Supaul district - Bhantabari-Haripur in Sunsari District, Nepal (via Kosi barrage).
- Amgachhi in Araria district - Rangeli in Morang District, Nepal.
- Bahadurganj (Baria) (Bairia bazar) in Kishanganj district - Gauriganj in Jhapa District, Nepal.
- Galgalia (Kishanganj district).

West Bengal

- Mirik in Darjeeling district - Pashupatinagar, Ilam, Nepal

== Cross-border railway lines ==
8 railway lines between India and Nepal either exist or they are under construction or planning as follows (listed east to west):

1. Babaganj-Nepalganj line - complete and operational:
2. Barhani-Kathmandu line - under planning:
3. Barhani-Kapilvastu line - under planning:
4. Nautanwa-Bhairwa line - under planning:
5. Raxaul-Kathmandu line - under planning:
6. Jaynagar-Bardibas railway line - mostly complete, except final and third phase (as of April 2022): 52 km out of total 68 km complete as of April 2022 while remaining is awaiting land acquisition.
7. Jogbani-Biratnagar railway line - mostly complete, except 8 km long under construction section (as of April 2022): total 18.6 km.
8. Kakarbhitta-New Jalpaiguri railway line - under planning:

== Border security ==
The Nepal–India border is an open border, which is relatively peaceful. Nepali and Indian nationals do not need passports or visas to enter each other's countries, and tens of thousands of people cross the border every day for tourism and commerce.

The Indian side of the border is regulated by Sashastra Seema Bal (SSB) along with local police. The Nepali side of the border is regulated by the Armed Police Force (APF) along with the local branch of Nepal Police. Often SSB (India) and APF (Nepal) perform joint patrols on the border. On a local level, Indian and Nepali district officials meet regularly to discuss security challenges and other issues on their respective border portions. Such meetings are usually attended by District Magistrates, local SSB representatives, customs chiefs from India including the Chief District Officer (CDO), local APF, Police and custom chiefs from Nepal.

== See also ==
- India–Nepal relations
- Indo-Nepal Border Road
- Dasgaja
