= Siraha 1 =

Parliamentary constituency in Madhesh Province, Nepal

- Parliamentary constituency
- The map of Siraha 1 constituency in Siraha district

- The map of Siraha 1(A) and Siraha 1(B) provincial constituency in Siraha
- Province: Madhesh Province
- District: Siraha District
- Population: 178,956 (2021)
- Electorate: 111,949 (21 November 2025)
- Major settlements: Bhagwanpur Rural Municipality, Sakhuwanankar Katti Rural Municipality, Lahan Municipality, Laxmipur Patari Rural Municipality (Ward 2-6) and Dhangadhimai Municipality (Ward 1-2)

Current constituency
- Created: 1991
- Party: RSP
- Member of Parliament: Bablu Gupta
- MPA 1(A): Rajendra Prasad Chaudhary CPN (UML)
- MPA 1(B): Raj Kumar Gupta PSP-Nepal

Siraha 1 is one of four parliamentary constituencies of Siraha District in Nepal. This constituency came into existence on the Constituency Delimitation Commission (CDC) report submitted on 31 August 2017.In 2026, Bablu Gupta of Rastriya Swatantra Party won the parliamentary election from this constituency.

== Incorporated areas ==
Siraha 1 incorporates Bhagwanpur Rural Municipality, Sakhuwanankar Katti Rural Municipality, Lahan Municipality, wards 2–6 of Laxmipur Patari Rural Municipality and wards 1 and 2 of Dhangadhimai Municipality.

== Assembly segments ==
It encompasses the following Madhesh Provincial Assembly segment

- Siraha 1(A)
- Siraha 1(B)

== Members of Parliament ==
=== Parliament/Constituent Assembly ===
Election	Member	Party
1991	Padma Narayan Chaudhary	Nepali Congress
1999	Ram Chandra Yadav	CPN (Unified Marxist-Leninist)
2008	Laxman Mahato	Madheshi Janaadhikar Forum, Nepal
June 2009	Laxman Mahato	Madhesi Jana Adhikar Forum, Nepal (Democratic)
2013	Padma Narayan Chaudhary	Nepali Congress
2017	Pradeep Giri	Nepali Congress
2022	Ram Shankar Yadav	CPN (Unified Marxist-Leninist)
2026	Bablu Gupta	Rastriya Swatantra Party

=== Provincial Assembly ===
==== 1(A) ====
Election	Member	Party
2017	Lagan Lal Chaudhary	CPN (Unified Marxist-Leninist)
May 2018	Lagan Lal Chaudhary	Nepal Communist Party
2022	Rajendra Prasad Chaudhary	CPN (UML)

==== 1(B) ====
Election	Member	Party
2017	Ashok Kumar Yadav	CPN (Unified Marxist-Leninist)
May 2018	Ashok Kumar Yadav	Nepal Communist Party
March 2021	Ashok Kumar Yadav	CPN (Unified Marxist–Leninist)
August 2021	Ashok Kumar Yadav	CPN (Unified Socialist)
2022	Raj Kumar Gupta	PSP, Nepal

== Election results ==
=== Election in the 2020s ===
==== 2026 general election ====
Candidate	Party	Votes	%
Bablu Gupta	Rastriya Swatantra Party	41,322	61.35
Ram Sundar Chaudhary	Nepali Congress	9,784	14.53
Ram Shankar Yadav	CPN (UML)	7,886	11.71
Ram Chandra Yadav	Nepali Communist Party	2,853	4.24
Satya Narayan Yadav	People's Socialist Party, Nepal	2,285	3.39
Ram Swarup Chaudhary	Janamat Party	1,589	2.36
Sanjiv Kumar Singh	Aam Janata Party	346	0.51
Basudev Sah	Rastriya Prajatantra Party	236	0.35
Tara Kumari Chaudhary	Ujyaalo Nepal Party	214	0.32
Others		837	1.24
Total		67,352	100.00
Registered voters/turnout		111,949	–
Majority		31,538	
Rastriya Swatantra Party gain			
Source: OnlineKhabar Election Update

==== 2022 general election ====
Candidate	Party	Votes	%
Ram Shankar Yadav	CPN (UML)	29,462	44.57
Padam Narayan Chaudhary	Nepali Congress	27,379	41.42
Yugal Kishore Sah	Janamat Party	6,849	10.36
Others		2,416	3.65
Total		66,106	100.00
Majority		2,083	
CPN (UML)			

==== 2022 Nepalese provincial elections ====
===== 1(A) =====
Party	Candidate	Votes
CPN (Unified Marxist–Leninist)	Rajendra Prasad Chaudhary	11,721
Nepali Congress	Sunil Kumar Mahato	11,550
Janamat Party	Amiri Yadav	3,682
Others		3,901
Result	CPN (UML) hold	
Source: Election Commission

===== 1(B) =====
Party	Candidate	Votes
People's Socialist Party, Nepal	Raj Kumar Gupta	16,239
CPN (Unified Socialist)	Ashok Kumar Yadav	13,233
Janamat Party	Shambhu Prasad Sah	5,527
Others		1,333
Result	PSP (Nepal) gain	
Source: Election Commission

=== Election in the 2010s ===
==== 2017 legislative elections ====
Party	Candidate	Votes
Nepali Congress	Pradeep Giri	23,951
CPN (Unified Marxist–Leninist)	Ganga Prasad Yadav	21,371
Federal Socialist Forum, Nepal	Raj Lal Yadav	13,351
Others		1,472
Invalid votes		2,954
Result	Congress hold	
Source: Election Commission

==== 2017 Nepalese provincial elections ====
===== 1(A) =====
Party	Candidate	Votes
CPN (Unified Marxist–Leninist)	Lagan Lal Chaudhary	11,542
Nepali Congress	Santosh Kumar Chaudhary	10,699
Federal Socialist Forum, Nepal	Baidya Nath Prasad Shah	5,868
Others		727
Invalid votes		1,139
Result	CPN (UML) gain	
Source: Election Commission

===== 1(B) =====
Party	Candidate	Votes
CPN (Unified Marxist–Leninist)	Ashok Kumar Yadav	11,110
Federal Socialist Forum, Nepal	Raj Kumar Gupta	10,608
Nepali Congress	Dev Nath Yadav	8,987
Others		959
Invalid votes		1,263
Result	CPN (UML) gain	
Source: Election Commission

==== 2013 Constituent Assembly election ====
Party	Candidate	Votes
Nepali Congress	Padma Narayan Chaudhary	12,183
UCPN (Maoist)	Muni Sah Sudi	8,277
CPN (Unified Marxist–Leninist)	Rajendra Mahato	7,493
Sadbhavana Party	Ram Narayan Mahato	1,743
Madhesi Jana Adhikar Forum, Nepal (Democratic)	Subha Nanda Chaudhary	1,166
Others		4,362
Result	Congress gain	
Source: NepalNews

=== Election in the 2000s ===
==== 2008 Constituent Assembly election ====
Party	Candidate	Votes
Madheshi Janaadhikar Forum, Nepal	Laxman Mahato	9,814
Nepali Congress	Padma Narayan Chaudhary	9,403
CPN (Unified Marxist–Leninist)	Ganga Prasad Yadav	6,327
CPN (Maoist)	Krishna Dev Singh Danuwar	3,437
Sadbhavana Party	Raj Kumar Gupta	3,036
Rastriya Prajatantra Party	Baidya Nath Prasad Shah	2,430
Dalit Janajati Party	Birendra Mahara Chamar	1,824
Sanghiya Loktantrik Rastriya Manch	Ram Chandra Chaudhary	1,212
CPN (Marxist–Leninist)	Ram Chandra Prasad Gupta	1,037
Others		2,465
Invalid votes		3,550
Result	MJFN gain	
Source: Election Commission

=== Election in the 1990s ===
==== 1999 legislative elections ====
Party	Candidate	Votes
CPN (Unified Marxist–Leninist)	Ram Chandra Yadav	14,810
Nepali Congress	Padma Narayan Chaudhary	13,855
Rastriya Prajatantra Party	Lagan Lal Chaudhary	9,428
CPN (Marxist–Leninist)	Ram Shankar Yadav	8,164
Rastriya Prajatantra Party (Chand)	Ran Lochan Mahato	2,160
Others		662
Invalid Votes		697
Result	CPN (UML) gain	
Source: Election Commission

==== 1994 legislative elections ====
Party	Candidate	Votes
Nepali Congress	Nitesh yadav	15,525
CPN (Unified Marxist–Leninist)	Rajendra Chaudhary	13,307
Rastriya Prajatantra Party	Ram Lochan Mahato	8,373
Others		1,075
Result	Congress hold	
Source: Election Commission

==== 1991 legislative elections ====
Party	Candidate	Votes
Nepali Congress	Padma Narayan Chaudhary	11,824
CPN (Democratic)	Chandra Shekhar Lal	11,320
Result	Congress gain	

== See also ==
- List of parliamentary constituencies of Nepal
