= Bhagwanpur Rural Municipality =

Bhagwanpur भगवानपुर
- Rural Municipality
- Location in Nepal
- Coordinates: 26.58°N 86.47°E
- Country: Nepal
- Province: Province No. 2
- District: Siraha District
- Established: 2073

Government
  - Chairperson: Ugra Narayan Yadav
  - Vice-Chairperson: Rekha Devi Yadav

Population (2011)
  - Total: 20,957

Languages
  - Local: Maithali
- Time zone: UTC+5:45 (Nepal Time)
- Postal code: 56500
- Area code: 033
- Website: http://www.bhagwanpurmun.gov.np/

Bhagwanpur is a rural municipality in Siraha District in Province No. 2 of south-eastern Nepal. At the time of the 2011 Nepal census it had a population of 20957 people living. It is located nearly 370 kilometers or 107 miles east of the capital, Kathmandu.

Thadi (Nepali: ठाड़ी) or Thadi Viswaspatti is the main market place in the municipality and a very old border town and a market place of Nepal in Siraha District bordering Indian town of Laukaha.

Thadi is one of the few towns which is a part of agreed route for Mutual Trade between India and Nepal. Nepal Government has set up a dedicated customs office in the town.

The town connects Lahan, Nepal to India.

== Demographics ==
At the time of the 2011 Nepal census, Bhagwanpur Rural Municipality had a population of 20,999. Of these, 95.9% spoke Maithili, 1.7% Tharu, 1.1% Urdu, 0.3% Nepali, 0.1% spoke Gurung and 0.2% other languages as their first language.

In terms of ethnicity/caste, 34.7% were Yadav, 9.1% Teli, 6.9% Dhanuk, 6.7% Khatwe, 6.5% Dusadh/Paswan/Pasi, 5.1% Musalman, 4.3% Chamar/Harijan/Ram, 3.8% Musahar, 2.0% Tharu, 1.9% Kumhar, 1.8% Halwai, 1.8% Kayastha, 1.6% Dhobi, 1.4% Kewat, 1.3% Sudhi, 1.2% Hajam/Thakur, 1.2% Tatma/Tatwa, 1.1% Baraee, 1.0% Kathabaniyan, 1.0% Mallaha, 0.9% Terai Brahmin, 0.8% Koiri/Kushwaha, 0.6% Hill Brahmin, 0.5% Danuwar, 0.5% Kalwar, 0.5% Majhi, 0.3% Kumal, 0.3% Sanyasi/Dasnami, 0.2% Mali, 0.1% Chhetri, 0.1% Dom, 0.1% Kami, 0.1% Kusunda, 0.1% Lohar, 0.1% Marwadi, 0.1% Rajput, 0.1% Sonar and 0.2% others.

In terms of religion, 94.8% were Hindu, 5.1% Muslim and 0.1% others.

In terms of literacy, 50.1% could read and write, 1.8% could only read and 48.0% could neither read nor write.

== Infrastructure ==
Rajbiraj Airport is the nearest airport, roughly 35 km away from Thadi. Shree Airlines operates daily flights between Rajbiraj and Kathmandu

The town is also connected to Laukaha Bazar railway station which is located in adjacent Indian town of Laukaha. The 268 km (167 mi) long Jainagar-Darbhanga-Narkatiaganj line and Sakri-Laukaha Bazar-Nirmali line were converted from metre to broad gauge in 2011–2012.

There are various bus operators who operate direct bus from Thadi in Bhagwanpur to Kathmandu via Lahan, Nepal which is 18 kn north of Thadi and also connects to Mahendra Highway. It is one of the major routes for tourist from India to go to travel Nepal.
