= Raxaul-Birgunj Friendship Bridge =

Friendship bridge between Nepal and India

India-Nepal Maitri Pul
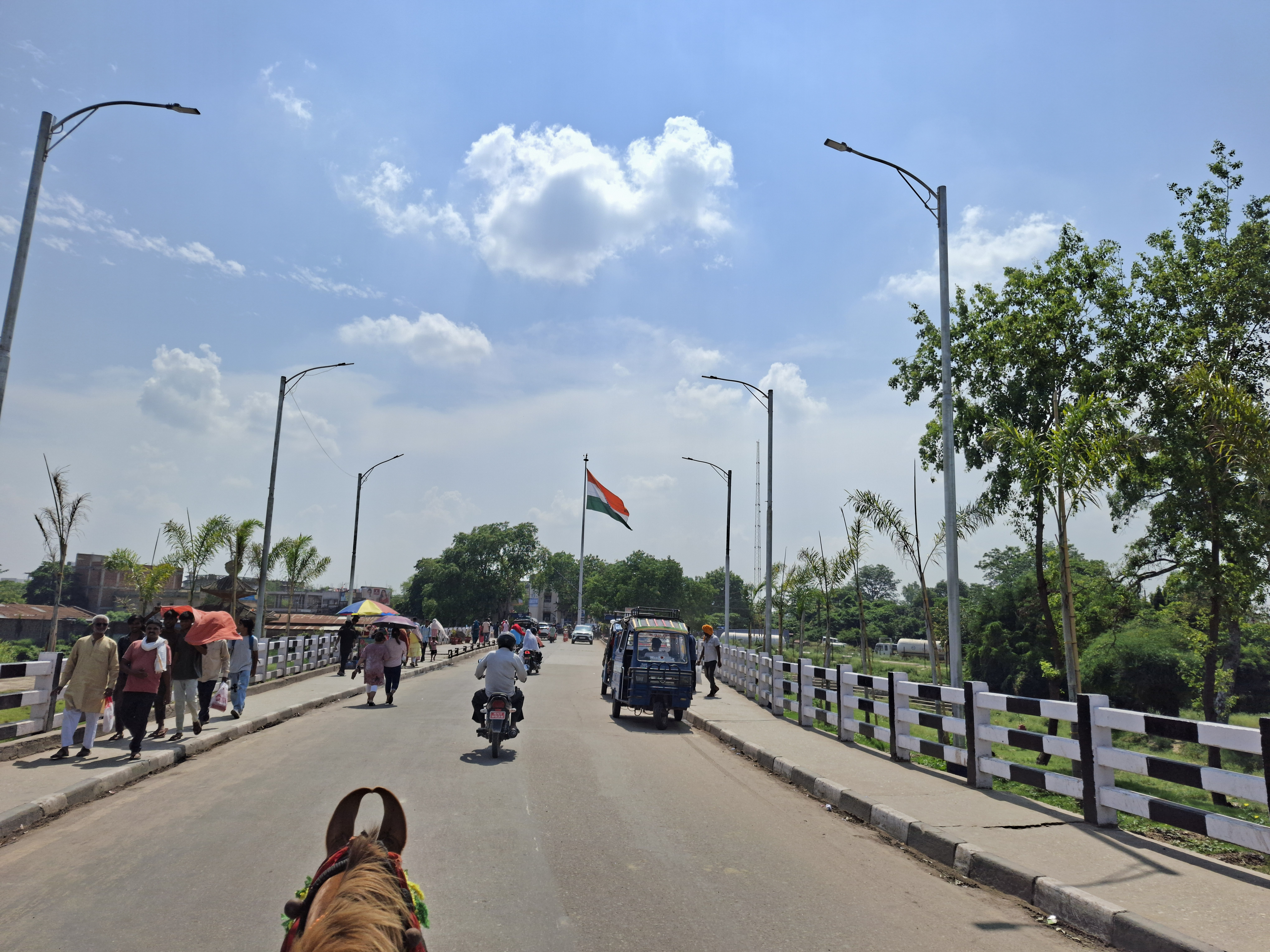
- Locale: Raxaul-Birgunj
- Other name: Raxaul-Birgunj Friendship Bridge
- Named for: Friendship relation between India and Nepal

Raxaul-Birgunj Friendship Bridge ( Devanagari: रक्सौल - बीरगंज मैत्री पुल ) also known as Maitri Pul or Friendship Bridge is a road bridge that connects the town of Raxaul in India to the metropolitan city of Birgunj in Nepal. It lies in the Dashgaja area over the Sirsiya river and serves as an India - Nepal border between the two cities of Raxaul and Birgunj. It provides an economic transit route between the two nations of Nepal and India. On a daily basis, a huge convoy of freight containers enters Nepal through the friendship bridge. It is an important bridge for the economic activities in Nepal.

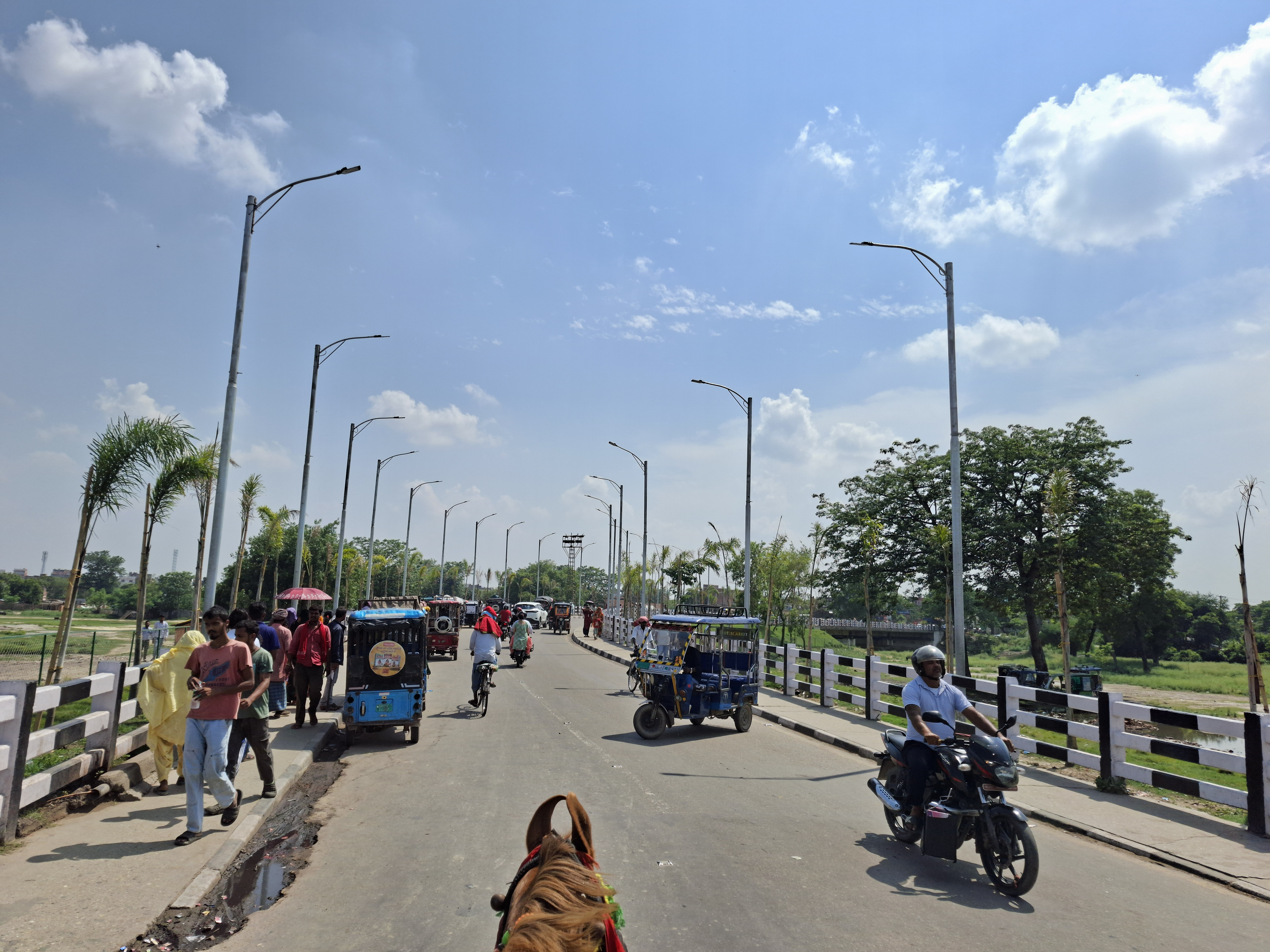
View of the Maitri Pul also called as Friendship Bridge on the Sirsiya river connecting two nations of India and Nepal.

== Description ==
The friendship bridge is at a distance of 400 meters south from the iconic Shankaracharya Gate in Birgunj.
