= Bablu Gupta =

Nepali social activist and politician (born 1997)

Honourable Bablu Gupta
- बब्लु गुप्ता

Member of Parliament, Pratinidhi Sabha
- Incumbent
- Assumed office 26 March 2026
- Preceded by: Ram Shankar Yadav
- Constituency: Siraha 1

Minister of Youth and Sports
- In office 26 October 2025 – 19 January 2026
- Prime Minister: Sushila Karki
- Preceded by: Teju Lal Chaudhary
- Succeeded by: Sasmit Pokharel

Personal details
- Born: July 22, 1997 (age 29) Lahan, Siraha district, Nepal
- Citizenship: Nepali
- Party: Rastriya Swatantra Party (2026)
- Other political affiliations: Independent (2025-2026)
- Parent: Bishun Baniya (father)
- Education: Bachelor of Public Health (ongoing)
- Occupation: Social activist, Politician
- Known for: Social activism, founding Nepal's first free clothing bank, humanitarian relief
- Website: hundredgroup.org.np

Bablu Gupta (Note: Nepali: बब्लु गुप्ता) (born 22 July 1997) is a social activist, politician, and former Minister of Youth and Sports in the Karki interim cabinet. He started his political career by joining Rastriya Swatantra Party in 2026, after resigning from his ministerial post.

In the 2026 general election, he won from Siraha 1 with 41,322 votes, defeating Ram Sundar Chaudhary of Nepali Congress, and Ram Shankar Yadav, seating MP of CPN (Unified Marxist–Leninist).

He is the founder and president of the non-profit organization 100's Group Nepal,an organization involved in humanitarian initiatives. Through this organization, Gupta established Nepal's first free clothing bank and led relief efforts during the COVID-19 pandemic.

== Early life and education ==
Bablu Gupta was born in Lahan, Nepal. He is currently studying in Bachelor of Public Health.

== Career ==
=== Social activism ===
Gupta founded an organization named 100's Group Nepal in Anamnagar, Kathmandu. The organization focuses on poverty alleviation through the donation and distribution of clothing, food, and emergency aid.

=== Political career ===
On 26 October 2025, Gupta was sworn in as Minister of Youth and Sports in the interim government led by Sushila Karki. On 19 January 2026, he resigned from the position to run in the 2026 Nepalese general election as a candidate for the Rastriya Swatantra Party. In the election held on 5 March 2026, Gupta was elected to the House of Representatives from the Siraha 1 constituency, receiving 41,322 votes. He took the oath of office as a member of the House of Representatives on 26 March 2026.

== Electoral performance ==
Election	Year	Constituency	Contested for	Political party	Result	Votes	% of votes
Nepal general election	2026	Siraha 1	Pratinidhi Sabha member	Rastriya Swatantra Party	Won	41,322	61.35%
