= Khutauna =

- Town & Village
- Nickname: KHTN
- Location of Khutauna in Bihar, India
- Coordinates: 26.50°N 86.40°E
- Country: India
- State: Bihar
- District: Madhubani
- Region: Mithila

Government
  - Type: Bihar State Government
  - Body: Block of Madhubani District_Bihar

Population (2011)
  - Total: 16,080
- Demonym: Maithil
- Time zone: UTC+05:30 (IST)
- PIN: 847227
- Telephone code: 06277
- Lok Sabha constituency: Jhanjharpur
- Vidhan Sabha constituency: Laukaha

Khutauna is a small town in the Madhubani district of northern Bihar state, India. Khutauna block consists of 14 wards. Khutauna is under the Phulparas subdivision and has its own post office. Khutauna is very close to the Indo-Nepal border.

Laukaha is a nearby town close to the border of the Nepalese town of Thadi. Laukaha in India and Thadi in Nepal are part of a designated trade route between India and Nepal. The Government of Nepal has set up a dedicated customs office in the town, and the Government of India has established a Land Customs Station with a superintendent-level officer.
