= Ashok Kumar Yadav (Siraha politician) =

Nepalese politician

Honourable Ashok Kumar Yadav
- अशोक कुमार यादव

Province Assembly Member of Madhesh Province
- Incumbent
- Assumed office 2017
- Preceded by: N/A
- Constituency: Siraha 1 (constituency)

Personal details
- Born: September 23, 1976 (age 49)
- Party: CPN (Unified Socialist)
- Occupation: Politician

Ashok Kumar Yadav (Nepali: अशोक कुमार यादव) is a Nepalese politician. He is a member of Provincial Assembly of Madhesh Province from CPN (Unified Socialist). Yadav, a resident of Sakhuwanankarkatti Rural Municipality, was elected via 2017 Nepalese provincial elections from Siraha 1(B).

== Electoral history ==
=== 2017 Nepalese provincial elections ===
Party	Candidate	Votes
CPN (Unified Marxist–Leninist)	Ashok Kumar Yadav	11,110
Federal Socialist Forum, Nepal	Raj Kumar Gupta	10,608
Nepali Congress	Dev Nath Yadav	8,987
Others		959
Invalid votes		1,263
Result	CPN (UML) gain	
Source: Election Commission
