= Padma Narayan Chaudhary =

Nepali politician

- पद्म नारायण चौधरी

Member of Parliament, Pratinidhi Sabha for Nepali Congress party list
- Incumbent
- Assumed office 4 March 2018

Member of Constituent Assembly
- In office 21 January 2014 – 14 October 2017
- Preceded by: Laxman Mahato
- Succeeded by: Pradeep Giri
- Constituency: Siraha 1

Member of Parliament, Pratinidhi Sabha
- In office May 1991 – May 1999
- Preceded by: Constituency established
- Succeeded by: Ram Chandra Yadav
- Constituency: Siraha 1

Personal details
- Born: 16 November 1947 (age 78)
- Party: Nepali Congress

Padma Narayan Chaudhary (Tharu) (born 1948) is a Nepali politician and a member of the House of Representatives of the Federal parliament of Nepal. He was elected from Nepali Congress under the proportional representation system. Following his election to parliament, he was appointed the coordinator for the Ministry of Agriculture and Livestock in the shadow cabinet of the main opposition Nepali Congress.

In the 2013 Constituent Assembly election, he was elected from Siraha-1 constituency under the first-past-the-post system. He had previously won the 1991 and 1994 parliamentary elections from the same constituency but lost in the 1999 and 2008 elections.
