= Bagha Kusmar =

- Town
- Location in Bihar, India
- Coordinates: 26.44°N 86.43°E
- Country: India
- State: Bihar
- District: Madhubani
- Region: Mithila
- Subdivision: Darbhanga

Government
  - MLA: Bharat Bhushan Mandal
  - MP: Ram Prit Mandal (JDU)
- Elevation: 59 m (194 ft)

Population (2011)
  - Total: 11,380

Language
  - Official: Maithili, Hindi, Urdu
- Time zone: UTC+05:30 (IST)
- PIN: 847409
- Telephone code: 06277
- Vehicle registration: BR 32
- Lok Sabha constituency: Jhanjharpur
- Vidhan Sabha constituency: Laukaha
- Sex ratio: 984:1000 ♂/♀
- Website: baghakusmar.wordpress.com

Bagha Kusmar is a small town in the Madhubani district in northern Bihar state, India. It is under Phulparas subdivision. The distance between Bagha Kusmar and its district headquarters is 52 km (32 mi). The distance between Bagha Kusmar and town Khutauna is 7 km (4.3 mi).

== Languages and religion ==
The main languages spoken in this town are Maithili, Hindi, and Urdu.

In this town live people from many religions, mainly Hindu and Muslim.

== Demographics ==
As of 2011 India census, Bagha Kusmar had a population of 11380 of which Males constitute 5737 of the population and females 5643. literacy rate of Bagha kusmar village was 62.00% compared to 61.80% of Bihar of which Male literacy stands at 77.16% while female literacy rate was 46.39%. In Bagha kusmar village population of children with age 0-6 is 2408 which makes up 21.16% of total population of village.

== Geography ==
Bagha Kusmar is located in the northern part of Bihar.

== Transport ==
Bagha Kusmar is well connected via road services. NH104 and SH51 are major road of Bagha Kusmar. Many other District road in Bagha Kusmar. It directly connect with Many city as Patna, Muzaffarpur, Darbhanga, Siliguri etc.

Nearest Railway station is Khutauna Railway station. It is situated on Sakri-Laukaha Bazar rail lines. Darbhanga airport is the nearest airport from Bagha Kusmar.

== Education ==
Government middle school, government primary school, P. Mak. Bagha Kusmar School Madhubani, Bihar and many CBSE Board schools.
