= Lagan Lal Chaudhary =

Nepalese politician

Honourable Lagan Lal Chaudhary
- लगन लाल चौधरी

Province Assembly Member of Madhesh Province
- Incumbent
- Assumed office 2017
- Preceded by: N/A
- Constituency: Siraha 1 (constituency)

Personal details
- Party: CPN (Unified Marxist–Leninist)
- Occupation: Politician

Lagan Lal Chaudhary (Nepali: लगन लाल चौधरी) is a Nepalese politician. He is a member of Provincial Assembly of Madhesh Province from CPN (Unified Marxist–Leninist). Chaudhary, a resident of Lahan, was elected via 2017 Nepalese provincial elections from Siraha 1(A).

== Electoral history ==
=== 2017 Nepalese provincial elections ===
Party	Candidate	Votes
CPN (Unified Marxist–Leninist)	Lagan Lal Chaudhary	11,542
Nepali Congress	Santosh Kumar Chaudhary	10,699
Federal Socialist Forum, Nepal	Baidya Nath Prasad Shah	5,868
Others		727
Invalid votes		1,139
Result	CPN (UML) gain	
Source: Election Commission
