= Karmegh =

Village in Bihar, India

- Village
- Location within Bihar Location within India
- Coordinates: 26°31′31″N 86°25′58″E
- Country: India
- State: Bihar
- District: Madhubani
- Block: Laukaha

Government
  - Type: Sarpanch

Area
  - Total: 38.76 km^{2} (14.97 sq mi)
- Elevation: 81 m (266 ft)

Population (2011)
  - Total: 39,855
  - Density: 1,028/km^{2} (2,663/sq mi)

Languages
  - Official: Hindi, Maithili
  - Other: Urdu, English
- Time zone: UTC+5:30 (IST)
- PIN: 847421
- STD code: 06277
- Vehicle registration: BR-32

Karmegh is a former village in Laukaha Block, Madhubani District, Bihar, India. It is situated near the border with Nepal, about 39 kilometres northeast of the district capital Madhubani, and 7 kilometres southwest of the subdistrict capital Laukaha. In 2011, there are 39,855 people residing within the village.

== Geography ==
Karmegh is located on the west of Bhuthi Balan River. Bihar State Highway 51 passes through the village. It has a total area of 3875.71 hectares.

== Demographics ==
According to the 2011 Census of India, it has 7,652 households. Out of the 39,855 residents, 20,448 men and 19,407 women. The literacy rate is 47.72%, with 12,224 of the male population and 6,794 of the female population being literate. The census location code of Karmegh is 219986.
