= Ram Shankar Yadav =

Nepali politician

- राम शंकर यादव

Member of Parliament, Pratinidhi Sabha
- Incumbent
- Assumed office 26 December 2022
- Preceded by: Pradeep Giri
- Constituency: Siraha 1

Personal details
- Born: 30 September 1961 (age 64) Siraha District
- Party: CPN (UML)

Ram Shankar Yadav is a Nepalese politician, belonging to the CPN (UML) currently serving as a member of the 2nd Federal Parliament of Nepal. In the 2022 Nepalese general election, he was elected from the Siraha 1 (constituency).
