= Pradeep Giri =

Nepalese politician (1945–2022)

Pradeep Giri MP
- प्रदीप गिरी

Member of the Pratinidhi Sabha
- In office 4 March 2018 – 20 August 2022
- Preceded by: Padma Narayan Chaudhary
- Constituency: Siraha 1
- In office October 1994 – May 1999
- Preceded by: Bishnu Bahadur Tamang
- Succeeded by: Dharmanath Prasad Sah
- Constituency: Siraha 5

Member of 1st and 2nd Nepalese Constituent Assembly
- In office 28 May 2008 – 14 October 2017

Personal details
- Born: 6 November 1945 Siraha District, Nepal
- Died: 20 August 2022 (aged 77) Medicity Hospital, Lalitpur, Nepal
- Party: Nepali Congress
- Education: Jawaharlal Nehru University (PhD); Benaras Hindu University

Pradeep Giri (6 November 1945 – 20 August 2022) was a Nepali politician from Siraha district a member of the House of Representatives from the Nepali Congress. He was also part of the party's central committee.

== Personal life ==
Giri was born in Bastipur, Siraha. He came from a political family. Giri's father Mitra Lal Giri was a prominent Congress leader, and uncle Tulsi Giri was Nepali Congress leader who later joined Panchayat system and became prime minister of Nepal.

== Political career ==
Pradip Giri was as famous at the national level as he was at the local level. During the Madhes movement, his role was in favor of the agitators. Giri was known as a socialist thinker and intellectual leader in the country and abroad along with Congress politics. Giri was elected as a member of the House of Representatives from Siraha Constituency No. 5 in the 2017 general election.

He became a proportional member from the Congress in the first and second Constituent Assembly elections.

He didn't sign the Constitution of Nepal 2072 citing it was incomplete and did not fulfil the demand of all citizens. Giri said, "It is true that I did not sign the constitution passed ignoring the demands of the Madhesi people. I have boycotted the parliament by raising the demand of Madhesis, the Madhesi people have understood this." He was serving as the member of the 1st Federal Parliament of Nepal. In the 2017 Nepalese general election, he was elected from the Siraha 1 constituency, securing 23,951(39.82%) votes.

He was influenced by the works of B. R. Ambedkar, the constitution maker of India. Throughout his life, he advocated for the rights of Dalits, Madhesis, Muslims, Janajatis, Adivasis, women, and LGBTQIA+ communities.

== Electoral history ==
=== 2017 legislative elections ===
2017 legislative elections
Siraha 1
| Party | Candidate | Votes |
|---|---|---|
| Nepali Congress | Pradeep Giri | 23,951 |
| CPN (Unified Marxist–Leninist) | Ganga Prasad Yadav | 21,371 |
| Federal Socialist Forum, Nepal | Raj Lal Yadav | 13,351 |
| Others | | 1,472 |
| Invalid votes | | 2,954 |
| Result | Congress hold | |

== Death ==
He died on 20 August 2022, at the age of 76, Nepal Mediciti Hospital in Lalitpur at around 9:30 pm on Saturday. He was suffering from cancer, and pneumonia coupled with it had led to multi-organ failure at the last stage. He always believed in ethical politics.

== See also ==
- Tulsi Giri
