= Gauriganj, Nepal =

Gauriganj गौरिगञ्ज
- Gauriganj Gaunpalika
- Location of Biratnagar in Province No. 1 Gauriganj (Nepal)
- Country: Nepal
- Province: Province No. 1
- District: Jhapa
- Wards: 6

Government
  - Type: Local Government
  - Chairperson: Fulwati Rajbanshi (NC)
  - Vice-Chairperson: Pujan Neupane (CON-UML)

Area
  - Total: 101.35 km^{2} (39.13 sq mi)
- Elevation: 80 m (260 ft)

Population (2021)
  - Total: 36,145
  - Density: 356.64/km^{2} (923.68/sq mi)

Languages
  - Official: Nepali
  - Local: Rajbanshi, surjapuri, Hindi
- Time zone: UTC+5:45 (NST)
- Postal code: 57200

Gauriganj (Nepali: गौरिगञ्ज) is a village and village development committee in Jhapa District in the Mechi Zone of southeastern Nepal. It is in a flat agricultural district in the extreme southeast of Nepal, between Kadamgachhi, Hukkagachhi and Bhavanipur, only about 3 km from the border with Bihar, India.
