= Thadi =

Thadi ठाढ़ी Thadi Viswaspatti
- Town
- Nickname: ठाढ़ी बिश्वासपट्टी
- Location in Nepal
- Coordinates: 26.58°N 86.47°E
- Country: Nepal
- Zone: Sagarmatha Zone
- Province No.: 2
- District: Siraha District
- Rural Municipality: Bhagwanpur

Government
  - Mayor: Bechan Yadav

Population
  - Total: 2,000
- Time zone: UTC+5:45 (NST)

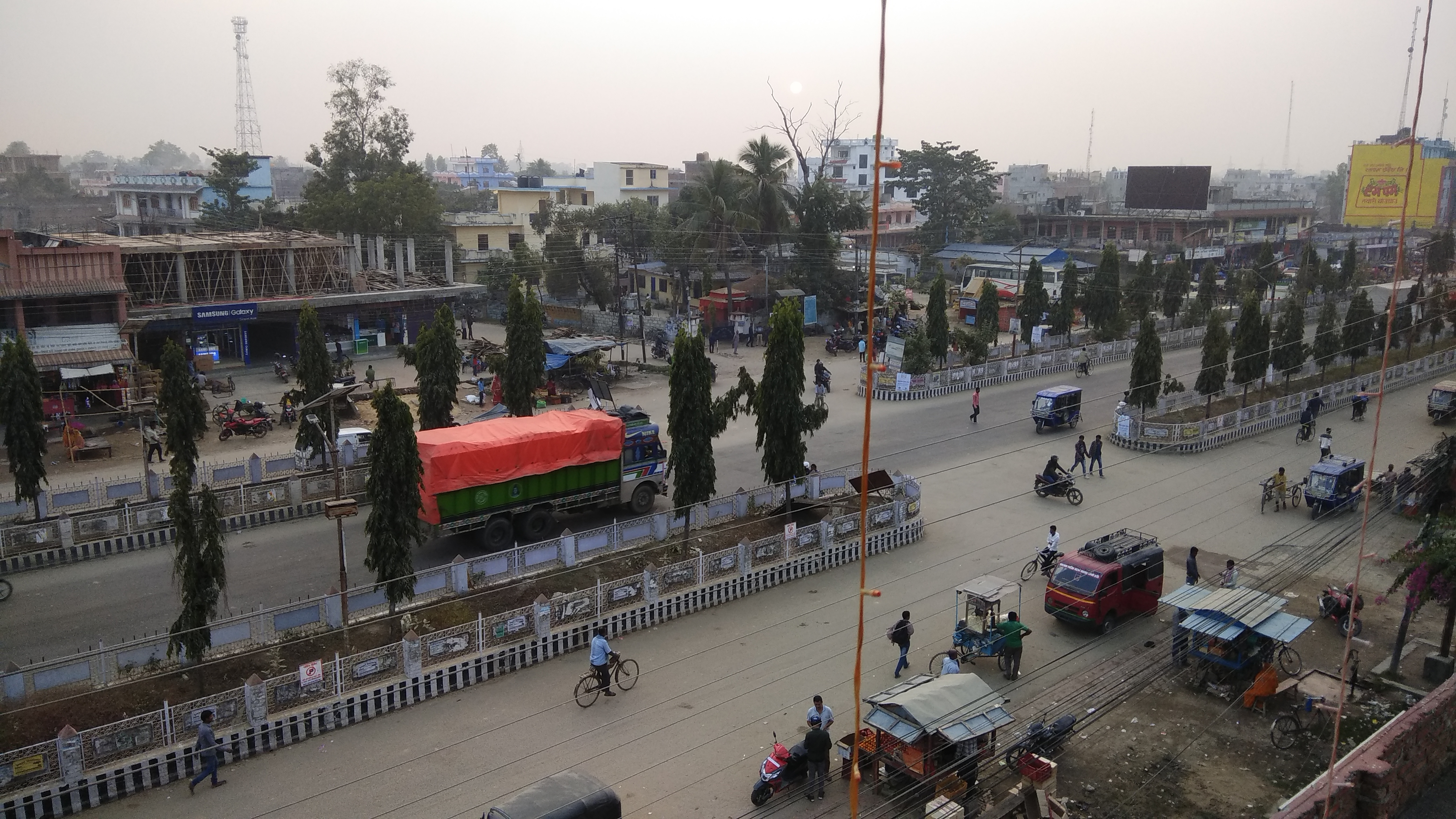
the Mahendra Highway in Lahan

Thadi (Maithili: ठाड़ी) or Thadi Viswaspatti is a very old border town and a market place of Nepal in Siraha District bordering Indian town of Laukaha. It is currently part of Bhagwanpur Rural municipality. It is located nearly 370 kilometers or 107 miles east of the capital, Kathmandu. Thadi was part of Tirhut Rulers of Simraungarh. The region was under rule of Karnad Dynasty formed by Nanyadeva Thadi is one of the few towns which is a part of agreed route for Mutual Trade between India and Nepal. Nepal Government has set up a dedicated customs office in the town.

Thadi became famous in 1960's as a industrialised town with one of Nepal's first Automatic Rice Processing plant set up by Legendary Philanthropist and Buisnessman Asharam Sharda who also was previously the jimidar of the area. He is still remembered by local people.

Thadi Customs Office has seen consistent growth in customs revenue. Food Grains and FMCG products are main imports while construction material and artefacts like Mitila Paintings are main exports.

The town connects Lahan, Nepal to India.

== Popular/Amenities ==
It has a popular Veer Hanuman Temple which is available for local public only during festivals as it is inside Sharda Rice and Oil Mills. The town has lot of Hotels as it is a transit point between India and Nepal. People generally stay in Thadi if they get late and miss the train from Laukaha Bazar railway station. Also, lot of people use it at a transit point to Lahan, Triyuga, Gaighat, Rajbiraj and onward travel to other towns of Nepal, people stop here and have meals. In order to maintain Law and order the officers of India and Nepal regularly meet around Thadi and Laukaha.

== Infrastructure ==
Rajbiraj Airport is the nearest airport, roughly 38 km away from Thadi. Shree Airlines operates daily flights between Rajbiraj and Kathmandu

The town is also connected to Laukaha Bazar railway station which is located in adjacent Indian town of Laukaha. The 268 km (167 mi) long Jainagar-Darbhanga-Narkatiaganj line and Sakri-Laukaha Bazar-Nirmali line were converted from metre to broad gauge in 2011–2012.

There are various bus operators who operate direct bus from Thadi to Kathmandu via Lahan, Nepal which is 18 kn north of Thadi and also connects to Mahendra Highway. It is one of the major routes for tourist from India to go to travel Nepal.
