= Shankaracharya Gate =

Gateway to Nepal

- शंकराचार्य द्वार
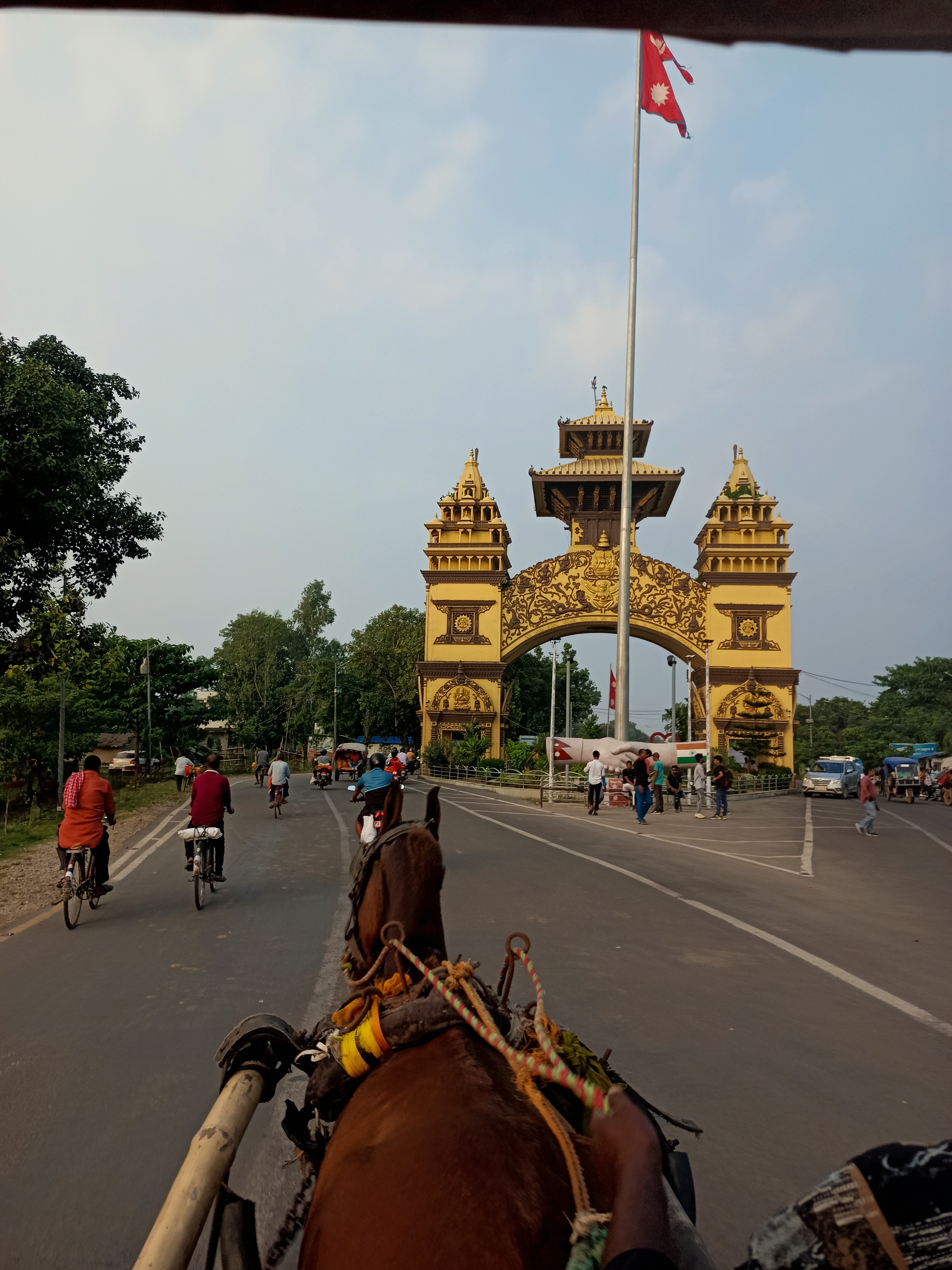
- Shankaracharya Gate
- Interactive map of the Shankaracharya Gate area
- Etymology: Adi Shankaracharya

General information
- Location: Indo-Nepal Border, Birgunj, Nepal
- Coordinates: 26.9909590°N 84.8585473°E

Shankracharya Gate ( Devanagari: शंकराचार्य द्वार ) is an iconic gate at the south outskirts of the Birgunj city in Nepal. It is located near the Indo - Nepal border and serves as the gateway to Nepal through the city of Birgunj from the Raxaul town in India. It also signifies the symbol of India- Nepal relations. Due to the beautiful structure of the iconic gate, it is a major tourist destination near the border city.

== Etymology ==
The name of the iconic gate is attributed to the revered Hindu leader cum philosopher Adi Shankaracharya.

== Description ==
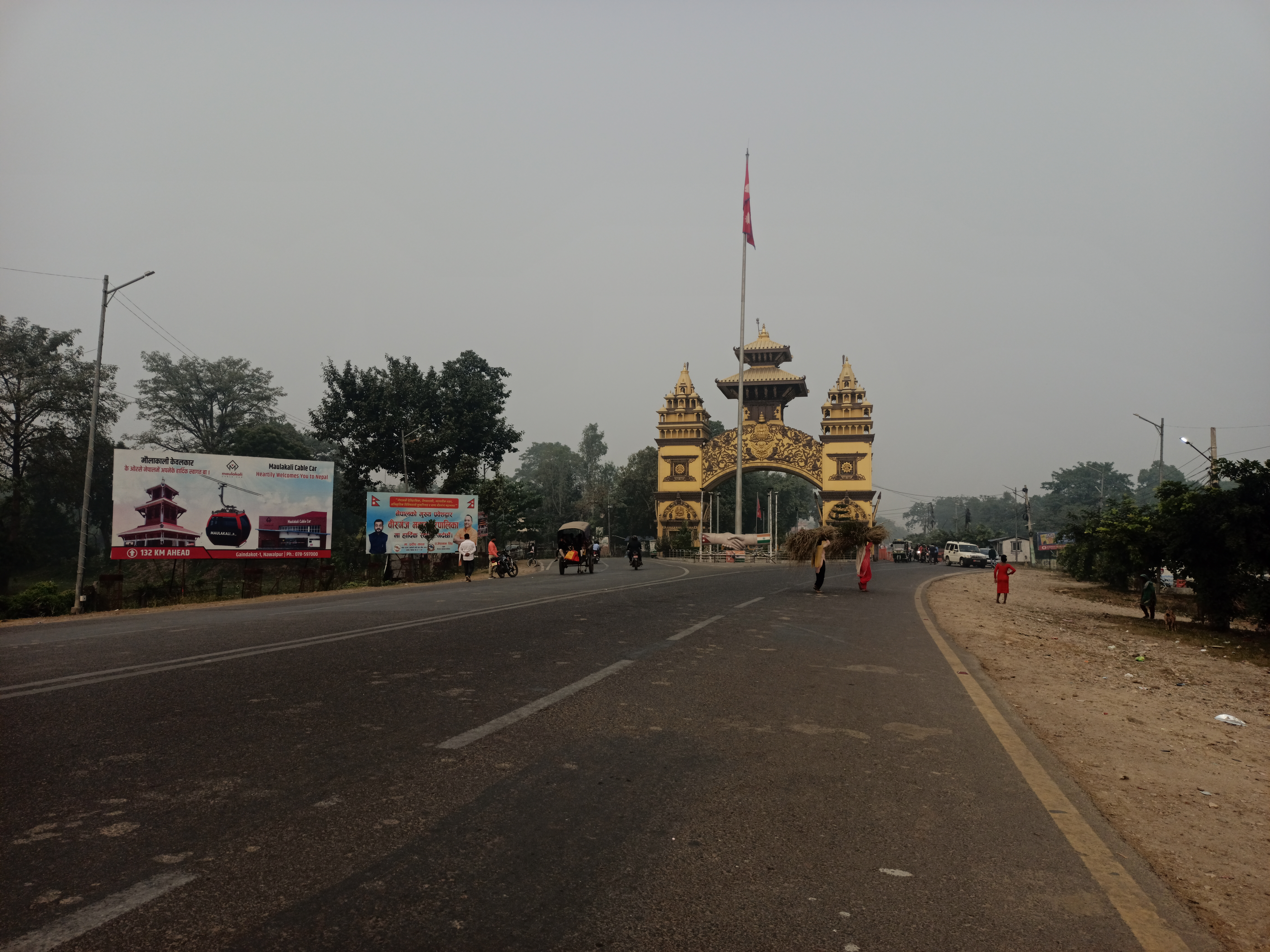
View of the Shankaracharya Gate near the city of Birgunj in Nepal.

Seven years ago, for beautification and greening the gateway of Nepal, a modern park was inaugurated at the gate, by the mayor Vijay Saraogi of the Birgunj Municipal Corporation in the Madhesh Pradesh of the Mithila region in Nepal. The construction of the modern park was carried out by the Samarpan Sansthan run by the Municipal Corporation of Birgunj. The park holds a water fountain.

The Consulate General of India in Birgunj, organises several ceremonial and cultural events at the gate on different occasions. The World Yoga Day and World Cycle Day, etc are the major occasions on which the ceremonial events are organised at the iconic gate.
