= Sakhuwanankarkatti Rural Municipality =

Sakhuwanankar Katti सखुवाननकर कट्टी
- Village development committee
- Location in Nepal
- Coordinates: 26.64°N 86.48°E
- Country: Nepal
- Zone: Sagarmatha Zone
- District: Siraha District

Population (1991)
  - Total: 2,594
- Time zone: UTC+5:45 (Nepal Time)
- Website: https://sakhuwanankarkattimun.gov.np/

Sakhuwanankar Katti is a village development committee in Siraha District in the Sagarmatha Zone of south-eastern Nepal. At the time of the 1991 Nepal census it had a population of 2594 people living in 419 individual households.
