= Laukaha Bazar railway station =

Railway station in Madhubani, Bihar, India

Laukaha Bazar

General information
- Location: Laukaha, Madhubani district, Bihar; India
- Coordinates: 26.5431°N 86.4628°E
- Elevation: 83 metres (272 ft)
- System: Indian Railways station
- Owner: Indian Railways
- Operator: East Central Railway
- Line: Barauni–Gorakhpur, Raxaul and Jainagar lines
- Platforms: 1

Construction
- Structure type: Standard on ground

Other information
- Status: Functioning
- Station code: LKQ
- Zone(s): East Central Railway (ECR)
- Division(s): Samastipur Division

History
- Opened: 1976
Location
- Location within Bihar

Laukaha Bazar railway station (station code: LKQ) serves Laukaha town in Madhubani district in the Indian state of Bihar. It located near the India–Nepal border.

== Geography ==
The area is slightly highland as against low lands all around. Numerous rivers flow in from Nepal and some of them cross the area. Laukaha is near the India–Nepal boundary and an extension of State Highway 51 (Khutuana–Laukaha Road) connects it to many towns in Nepal.

== History ==
The area was developed with metre-gauge tracks. The 72 km (45 mi) long Nirmali branch (Darbhanga–Nirmali) opened between 1883 and 1886. The Sakri–Jainagar branch was opened in 1905. The Jhanjharpur–Laukaha Bazar line was opened in 1976.

=== Gauge conversion ===
The 268 km (167 mi)-long Jainagar–Darbhanga–Narkatiaganj line and Sakri–Laukaha Bazar–Nirmali line were being converted from metre to broad gauge in 2011–2012.

Preceding station	Indian Railways	Following station
Khutauna towards ?	East Central Railway zone Sakri–Laukaha Bazar branch line	Terminus
