= Lahan =

Municipality in Siraha District, Nepal

Lahan लहान
- Municipality (नगरपालिका)
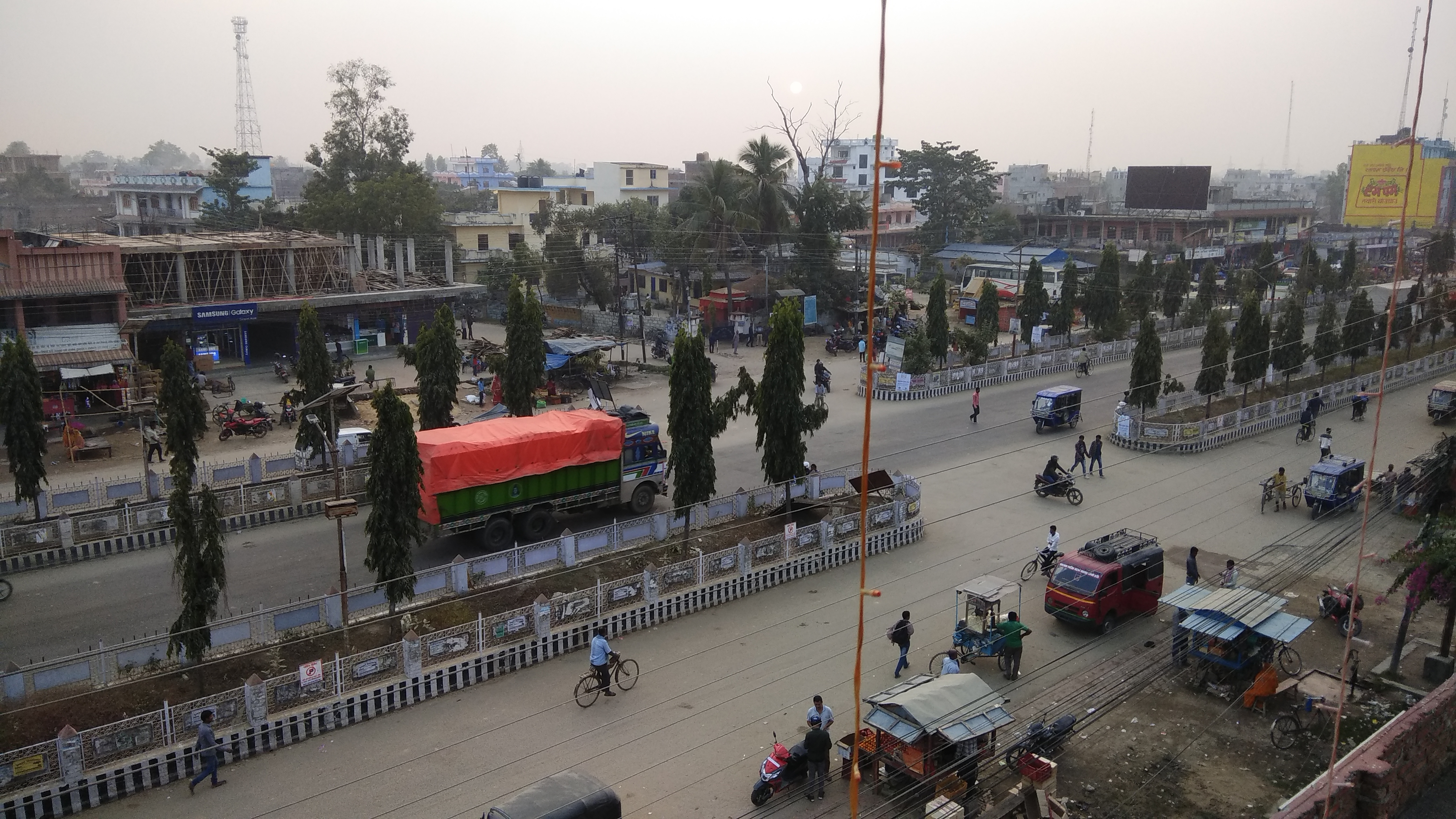
- Mahendra highway passing through the Lahan municipality

- Location in Nepal
- Coordinates: 26°42′30″N 86°29′30″E
- Country: Nepal
- Province: Madhesh
- District: Siraha

Government
  - Type: Lahan Municipality
  - Mayor: Mahesh Prasad Chaudhary (Congress)
  - Deputy Mayor: Ramchalitar Mahato (People's Socialist Party, Nepal)

Area
  - Total: 167.17 km^{2} (64.54 sq mi)

Population (2021)
  - Total: 102,031
  - Density: 610/km^{2} (1,600/sq mi)
- 36th densest city of (Nepal)
- Time zone: UTC+5:45 (NST)
- Postal code: 56502
- Area code: 033
- Website: lahanmun.gov.np

Lahan (लहान) is a municipality in the Siraha district of Madhesh, Nepal. Lahan is the 36th densest municipality in the country, with a population of 102,031 spread out across 24 wards, the most wards of any Nepalese municipality. It is connected by the east-west highway. It is located nearly 261 km east of the capital, Kathmandu via B.P. Highway and E-W Highway and 424 km east via Narayanghat-Mugling Highway. Lahan is located at the latitude of 26.717 and longitude of 86.483. It is at an elevation of 111 meters above sea level. It follows the Nepali time zone, UTC Offset: +05:45 hours.

Laukaha in India and the nearby town of Thadi which is 18 km south of Lahan in Nepal are a part of one of the agreed routes for mutual trade between India and Nepal. Lahan connects Thadi to the rest of Nepal. Nepal The Government of Nepal has set up a dedicated customs office in the town. and Government of India has set up a Land Customs Station with a Superintendent level officer. So, in simple import and export are allowed in this location. Sarda and Murarka families set up many industries near the town since 1960's.

The population has increased gradually due to urbanization This city has become a market hub in the eastern part of Madhesh. Many people come from Udaypur for sales and shopping as well.

== Health ==
The Lahan municipality has good health facilities with proper medical equipment in a number of hospitals

1. Sagarmatha Choudhary Eye Hospital, a non-profit eye hospital serving residents of Eastern Nepal and neighboring districts of India. A lot of people visit the town for eye and related treatment from Indian border districts of Supaul; Saharsa; Darbhanga and Madhubani via the Thadi border.

2. Provincial Hospital Lahan, is a government hospital of Madhesh province located in the Hospital chowk of Lahan which has a team of doctors and staff with medical lab facilities.

3. Lahan Advance Hospital

4. Saptarishi Hospital - Lahan

5. Clubfoot Clinic – Lahan

The Clubfoot Clinic Lahan provides specialized services for children born with Congenital Talipes Equinovarus (CTEV), commonly known as clubfoot. The clinic follows the Ponseti Method, an internationally recognized, effective, and minimally invasive treatment approach.

The clinic offers: screening and early identification of clubfoot in infants, serial plaster casting (Ponseti casting), tenotomy procedures, bracing (Foot Abduction Brace) and follow-up, parent counseling and guidance on home care, and regular monitoring to prevent relapse.

== Education ==
Lahan City is the educational hub of Madhesh Province, Nepal known for its numerous schools, colleges, and institutions. It attracts students from various districts, offering quality education and academic opportunities. The city's growing educational infrastructure has made it a center for learning and development.

=== Campus ===
1. Lahan Technical School - CTEVT (लहान प्राविधिक शिक्षालय ), Popular technical school in Madhesh Province for sub engineering, Agricultural, Ophthalmic diploma.

2. J. S. Murarka Multiple Campus, One of the known non technical campus in Madhesh Province for Bachelor(BA, B.Sc, BICTE, B.Ed, BBS, BSW) and Master(MA, M.Ed, MBS) degrees.

3. Royal Softech College

4. Everest College

=== Schools ===
1. Little Star English Secondary School, One of the well known school in Madhesh province

2. Apollo Om Secondary School, One of the know school in Lahan

3. Lahan Merry Children Academy Secondary School.

4. Lahan Paragon Public School.

5.Lotus Secondary English Boarding School.

6.Baby Angel Secondary School Lahan

7.SOS, School of Scholars, Lahan

== Transportation ==
=== Airport ===
Rajbiraj Airport is the nearest airport 43.1 km away from Lahan where the one daily flight from Rajbiraj to the capital city Kathmandu is operated with a flight time of 35 minutes.

=== Railways ===
The city is also connected to Laukaha Bazar railway station which is located in nearby Indian town of Laukaha, 18 km south via Nepali town of Thadi which is one of the main entry and exit point for people of Nepal and India. The 268 km (167 mi) long Jainagar-Darbhanga-Narkatiaganj line and Sakri-Laukaha Bazar-Nirmali line were converted from metre to broad gauge in 2011–2012.

== Demographics ==
Major Ethnic/Caste Groups in Lahan Municipality
1. Tharu (17.1%)
2. Yadav (11.6%)
3. Kushwaha (8.49%)
4. Muslim (8.04%)
5. Musahar (8.04%)
6. Others (46.8%)

According to the latest census data from 2021, Lahan Municipality has a total population of 91,766. The five largest caste and ethnic groups represent a combined 53.25% of the population. These groups are:

Tharu – 15,660 (17.06%)

Yadav– 10,648 (11.61%)

Kushwaha – 7,795 (8.49%)

Muslim – 7,382 (8.04%)

Musahar – 7,380 (8.04%)

These five communities together account for 48,865 individuals in the municipality.
