= Laukaha =

- Town
- Location in Bihar, India
- Coordinates: 26.55°N 86.47°E
- Country: India
- State: Bihar
- Region: Mithila
- District: Madhubani
- Elevation: 75 m (246 ft)

Population (2001)
  - Total: 17,730
- Time zone: UTC+5:30 (IST)
- PIN: 847421
- Telephone code: 06276
- Lok Sabha constituency: Jhanjharpur
- Vidhan Sabha constituency: Laukaha

Laukaha is a border town and community development block in the district of Madhubani in the Indian state of Bihar. It is close to the border with Nepal and the Nepalese town of Thadi. The population of Laukaha was between 11,000 and 15,000 in the early 2000s but is now around 30,000.

Laukaha has a primary school, high school, inter college, a police station, a post office, a branch of State Bank of India & Gramin Bank in the market.

The town was historically part of the Karnat dynasty of Mithila kings starting from Nanyadeva. The entire Terai region of Nepal was under the Karnats until the British ceded part of the Tirhut region of Terai to Nepal.

The River Bhutahi balan also draws people to the town for tourism; it is a tributary of the River Kosi. During the festive season of Chhath, devotees visit this river to offer prayers to the God Sun.

Laukaha in India and Thadi in Nepal are a part of one of the agreed routes for mutual trade between India and Nepal. The Government of Nepal has set up a dedicated customs office in the town and the Government of India has set up a land customs station with a superintendent level officer.

== Transportation ==
Laukaha is connected to NH 57 via Khutauna to Phulparas. The approximate distance from Laukaha to Phulparas is 30 km. Laukaha is also connected through bus service to Kathmandu and other towns. Laukha is connected by bus service to all the big cities of Bihar as well as to New Delhi. The nearest railway station is in Jayanagararound 35 km away A broad gauge railway line has been in the construction phase.

Nearest airport is in Nepal Rajbiraj Airport which is around 40 km away. Shree Airlines operates daily flights between Rajbiraj and Kathmandu. Flight time is approximately 25 mins.

== Villages ==
As of 2011, there are a total of 44 villages under the administration of Laukaha. They are:

- Anharban
- Bagha Kusmar
- Baghmaria
- Balampatti
- Bandar Jhuli
- Barkor
- Barmotar
- Barmotar Bhajnaha
- Barmotar Rae Chanda
- Basania
- Basdeopur
- Bauraha
- Bela
- Bhajnaha
- Birpur Barapatti Pindraun
- Chatarbhuj
- Durgipatti
- Ekhatha
- Ekhatha
- Hinguwa
- Hudra
- Jhajhri
- Jhanjhpatti Asa
- Jhanjpatti Doman
- Kalripatti
- Karmegh
- Khutauna
- Lachhmipur
- Lahria
- Lalmunia Munhara
- Lataunha
- Madhopur
- Majhaura
- Naraenpur
- Parsahi Sirsia
- Pathrahi
- Piprahi
- Prayagpur
- Sihula
- Siktiahi
- Siswar
- Tengrar
- Urhwa
- Urhwa
