= Rajbiraj Airport =

Airport in Nepal

Rajbiraj Airport राजविराज विमानस्थल
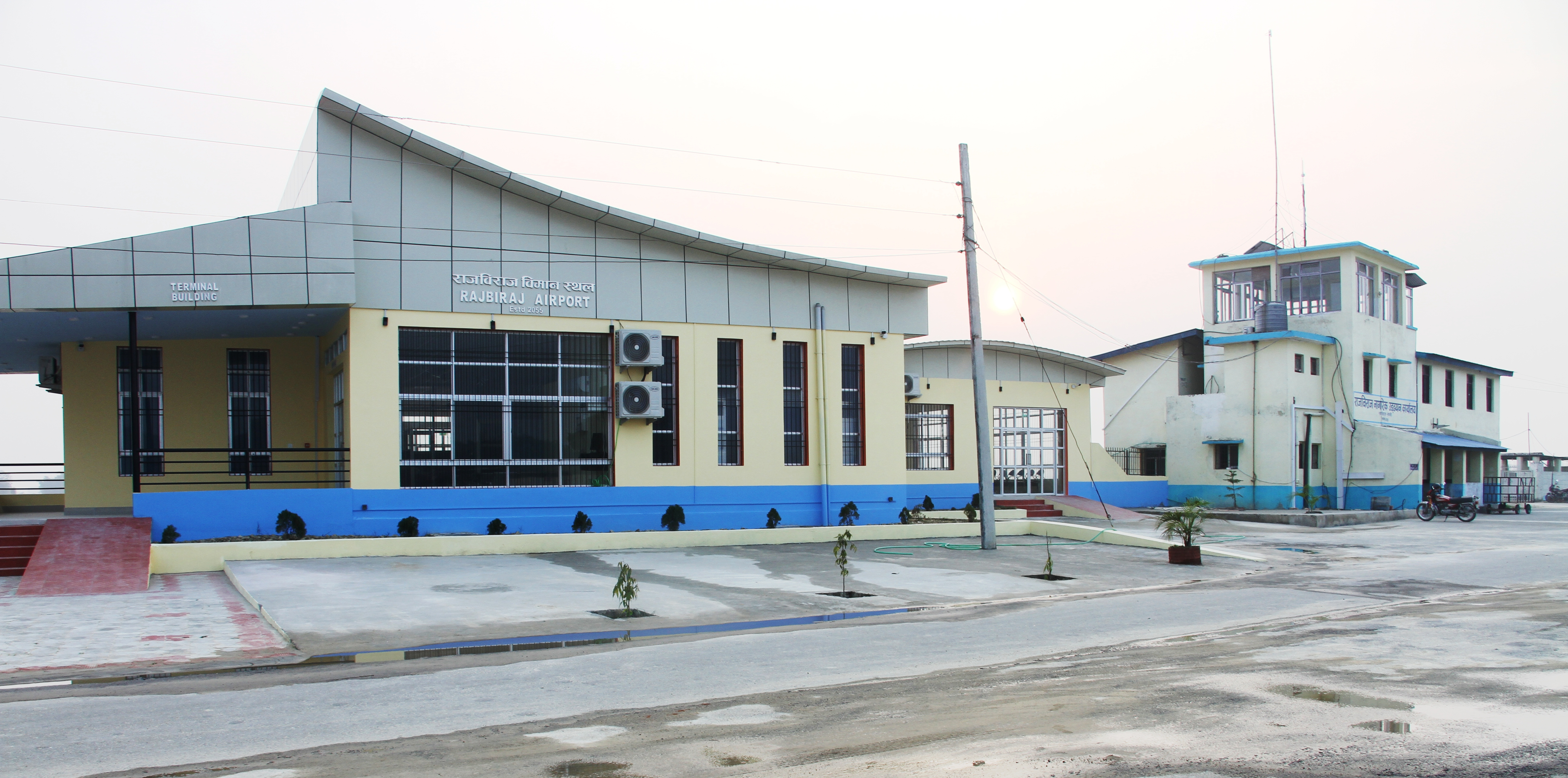
- Passenger Terminal
- IATA: RJB; ICAO: VNRB

Summary
- Airport type: Public
- Owner: Government of Nepal
- Operator: Civil Aviation Authority of Nepal
- Serves: Rajbiraj, Nepal
- Elevation AMSL: 250 ft (76 m)
- Coordinates: 26°30′31″N 86°44′14″E
- Website: rajbiraj.caanepal.gov.np

Map
- Location of airport in Nepal

Runways
Direction	Length		Surface
Direction	m	ft	Surface
11/29	1,500	4,921	Asphalt

Rajbiraj Airport (IATA: RJB, ICAO: VNRB) is a domestic airport located in Rajbiraj serving Saptari District, a district in Madhesh Province in Nepal.

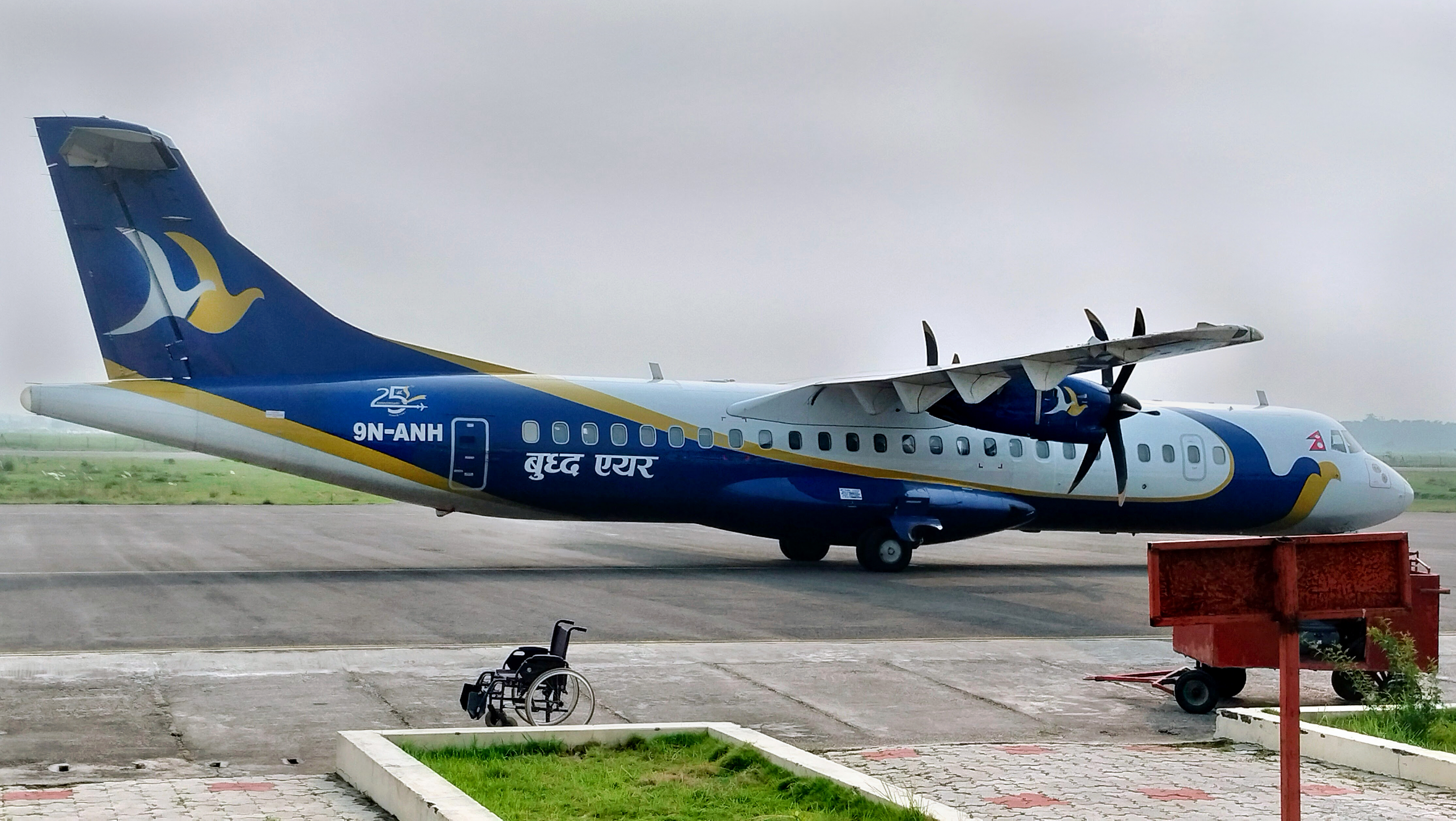
Buddha Air aircraft at Rajbiraj airport, Nepal

After eleven years of complete shut down, the airport resumed its operations on 23 May 2018. The airport is used by Local Residents as well as Tourists who come to visit Koshi Barrage, Kishi Tappu Wildlife reserve and also as transit airport to go to nearby towns in India.

== History ==
Following the days after its official inauguration in 1959 by the then transport minister Ganesh Man Singh, the airport was closed down due to inadequate infrastructures and runway safety measures. Several subsequent attempts were made later on to restore flight services but were all disrupted, mainly due to the lack of a blacktopped runway. The airport finally halted all the flights from 2007.

In 2015–16, the Civil Aviation Authority of Nepal allocated a budget of Nepali Rupees 303 million for an upgradation of the airport. The airport upgradation project was awarded to a joint venture company in October 2016 with the completion deadline of November 2017, which was extended for 5 months. The inaugural flight after the renovation was Shree Airlines flight on 23 May 2018 while the regular flight started from 25 June 2018. The Airport has since then been one of the very successful.

== Facilities ==
The airport resides at an elevation of 250 feet (76 m) above mean sea level. Since the renovation of the airport in 2018, the airport has one asphalt runway which is 1,500 metres (4,921 ft) in length. There is a good hotel by name of S K Airport Hotel nearby which is a popular restaurant for people of Rajbiraj

== Airlines and destinations ==
Airlines	Destinations
Buddha Air	Kathmandu
