= Kalyanpur–Gaighat Road =

Roads in Nepal

- Udayapur 1 Constituency Road

Route information
- Length: 18 km (11 mi)

Major junctions
- South end: Kalyanpur
- North end: Gaighat

Location
- Country: Nepal
- Provinces: Koshi Province, Madhesh Province
- Districts: Udayapur District, Saptari District

Highway system
- Roads in Nepal

Kalyanpur–Gaighat Road (Udayapur 1 Constituency Road ) is a national priority road in Nepal located between Koshi Province and Madhesh Province. The road connects Khadak Municipality in Saptari District to Triyuga Municipality in Udayapur District. The total length of the highway is 18 kilometres (11 mi) and the maximum elevation of the road is 117 metres (384 ft).

The road starts at Kalyanpur of Khadak Municipality extracting from Mahendra Highway (NH01) and passes through Shivalik hills and jungles to enter the Inner Terai Valley of Udayapur. The road then intersects with Sagarmatha Highway (NH16) at Motigada of Triyuga Municipality. The road passes through the area between Kalyanpur and Motigada: Chakuwa, Dhanha and Rikkiyathoma. This road is categorised as an Electoral Constituency Strategic Road

== See also ==
- Election Constituency Strategic Road
- List of roads in Nepal
