= Sagarmatha Highway =

Road in Nepal

Sagarmatha Highway सगरमाथा राजमार्ग
- राष्ट्रिय राजमार्ग १६
- National Highway 16
- Sagarmatha Highway in red
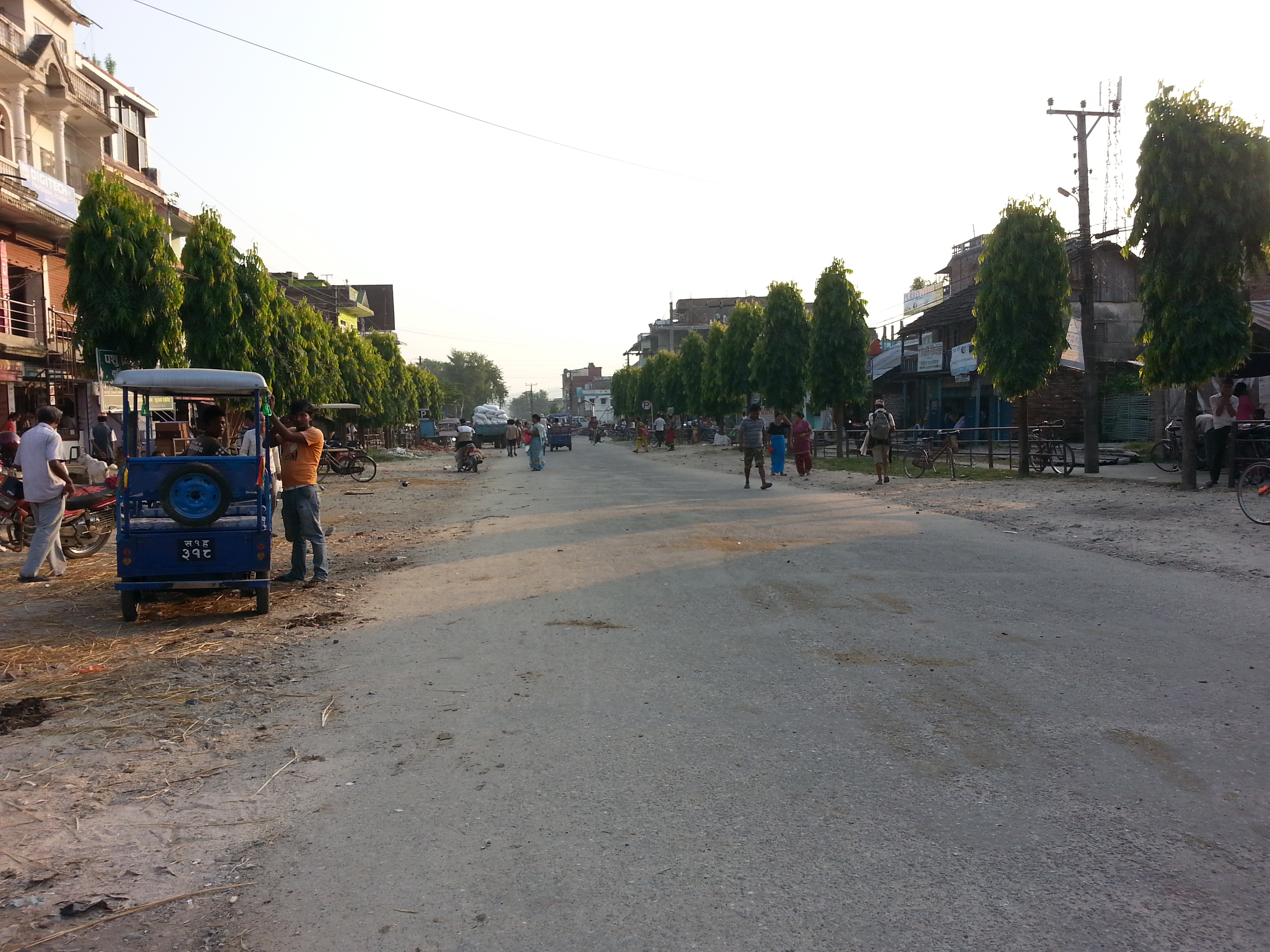

Route information
- Maintained by MoPIT (Department of Roads)
- Length: 176 km (109 mi)

Major junctions
- From: Thadi, Siraha
- Kadmaha, Gaighat
- To: Solu, Solukhumbu

Location
- Country: Nepal
- Primary destinations: Kadmaha, Triyuga, Saune, Khanbu, Diktel

Highway system
- Roads in Nepal
← NH15	→ NH17

Sagarmatha Highway or NH16 (previously: H09)is an Interprovincial National Highway of Nepal that connects Solukhumbu District to Siraha District via Udayapur District. At Kadmaha the Sagarmatha Highway crosses Mahendra Highway (NH01) which also called East–West National Highway which runs across the Terai geographical regions of Nepal.

The construction of the road began 23 years ago to link Diktel, the headquarters of Khotang with Gaighat of Udayapur. In 1994, the then Prime Minister Manmohan Adhikari had inaugurated the construction work at Bokse in Gaighat. The 156 kilometre long Sagarmatha Highway has been constructed with the primary aim of linking Diktel with the national road network.

The highway starts at Indo-Nepal border called Thadi and runs north towards Lahan. The road terminates at Lahan merging with NH01 and starts again at Kadmaha which is 6.69 kilometres (4.16 mi) east from Lahan and runs north towards Siswari which is 12.11 kilometres (7.52 mi) far. From Siswari up to Jaljale the road runs on Sivalik Hills surrounded by jungle. The road is winding and have many Hairpin turns. From Jaljale the road runs on plain terrain toward north-east and enters into Gaighat Bazar crossing the Triyuga river through Triyuga bridge. The distance from Jaljale to Gaighat is 7.25 kilometres (4.50 mi). From Gaighat to Phoksingtar the distance is 53 kilometres (33 mi) and the whole section runs on Lower Himalayas which is called Mahabharat Hills. There is jungle and winding roads. There are destinations e.g. Saune, Ranibas and Pokhari. At Phoksingtar the road crosses Sunkoshi River and enters into Khotang District and runs north parellel Sunkosi River upto Regmitar. At Regmitar NH16 crosses NH12 and continue runs north upto Mohure. At Mohure the NH16 highway merges with NH03 finally.

#	Section	Length (KM)	Status
1	Thadi-Lahan	18.00	Graveled
2	Kadmaha-Siswari	12.11	Black topped (2 lane)
3	Siswari-Jaljale	08.62	Black topped (2 lane)
4	Jaljale-Gaighat	7.25	Black topped (2 lane)
5	Gaighat-Phoksingtar	53.00	Black topped (20.72); Gravelled (15.28); Earthen (17.00)
6	Phoksingtar-Mohure	77.00	Earthen

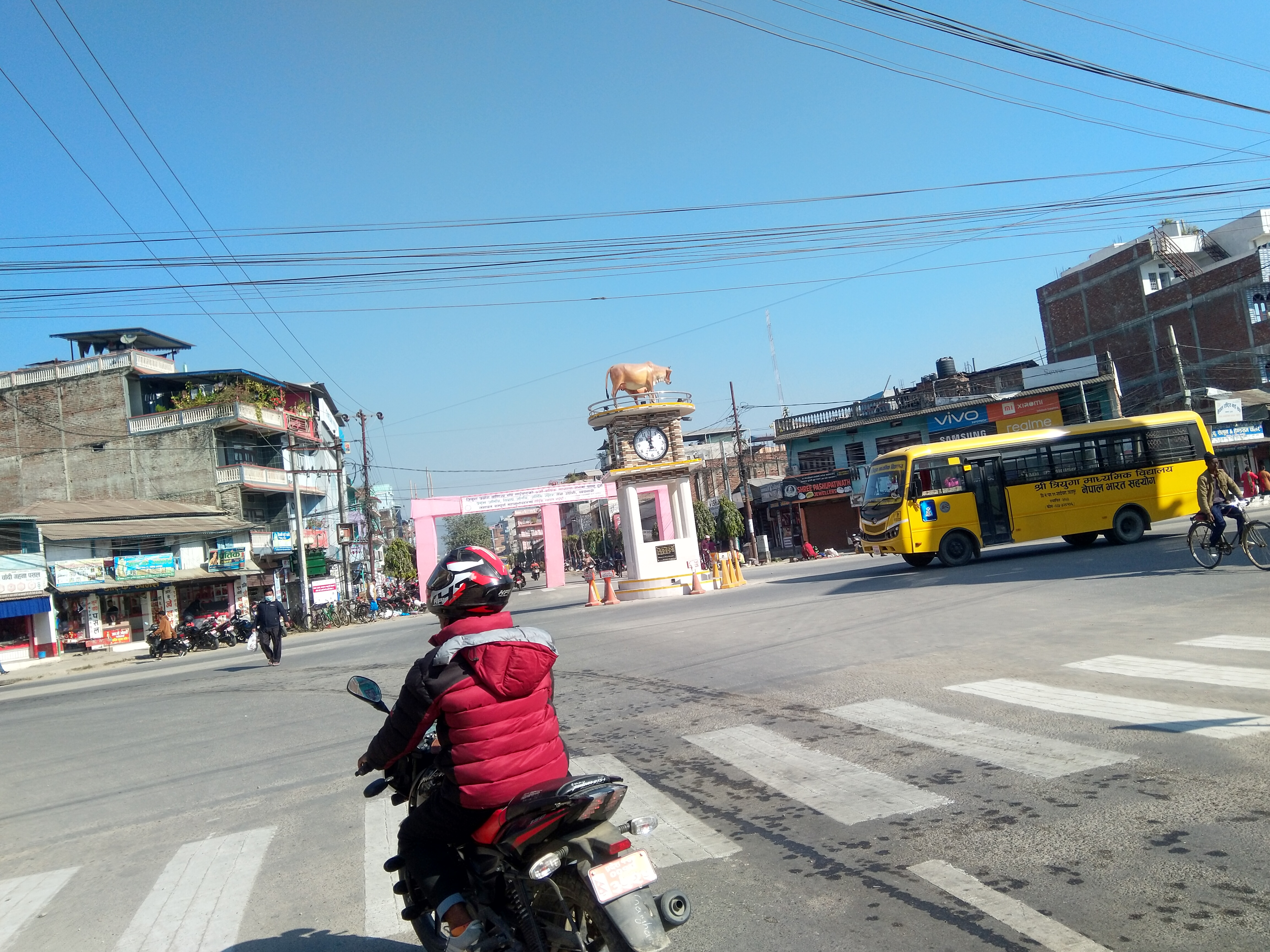
View of a crossroad (Mainchowk, Gaighat) of Sagarmatha Highway and Madan Bhandari Inner Terai Highway, a clock tower in center with statue of cow on its top.
