= Gaighat, Nepal =

Gaighat गाइघाट
- Neighborhood (District Headquarters)
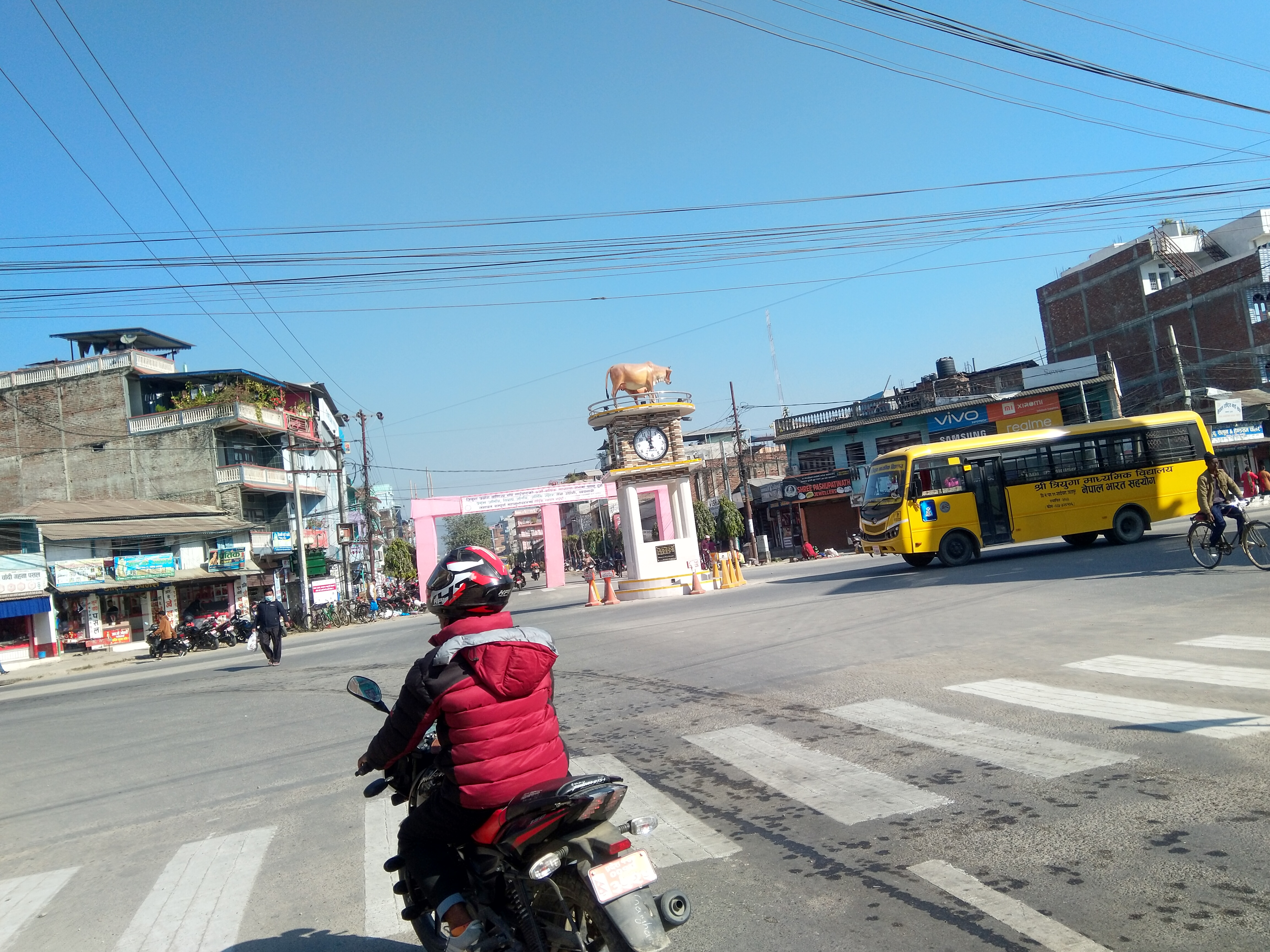
- Mainchowk-Gaighat

- Location in Koshi province Gaighat (Nepal)
- Coordinates: 26°47′26″N 86°42′07″E
- Country: Nepal
- Province: Province No. 1
- District: Udayapur
- Municipality: Triyuga
- Ward: 11 & 12
- Incorporated with city: 1997

Government
  - Ward Chairperson (ward 11): Bishwaraj Bhattarai
  - Ward Chairperson (ward 12): Jai Bikram Rai

Area
  - Total: 16.11 km^{2} (6.22 sq mi)

Population (2011)
  - Total: 14,243
  - Density: 884.1/km^{2} (2,290/sq mi)
- Time zone: UTC+5:45 (NST)
- Area code: 035

Gaighat (Nepali: गाइघाट) is an administrative centre within Triyuga Municipality and the headquarter of Udayapur District located in Koshi Province of Nepal. Gaighat is divided into 2 wards called Gaighat Bazar and Old Gaighat. The Gaighat (Gaighat Bazar) is located in Ward No. 11 and Old Gaighat is in Ward No. 12 of Triyuga Municipality. Total area of two wards is 16.11 square kilometres (6.22 sq mi) and total population is 14,243 with 2832 households.

Triyuga Municipality
Ward No.	Admin. Centre	Area (km^{2})	Pop. 2011	Households
11	Gaighat Bazar	12.3	7932	1547
12	Old Gaighat	3.81	6311	1285

== Background ==
The headquarter of Udayapur District was situated on the hill of Udayapurgadhi in Panchawati village before 1972. Government took decision to move the headquarter to the plain of Gaighat in 1972 and in 1972 it moved to Gaighat. It was a Village development committee until 1997. It incorporated to Triyuga Municipality along with Deuri and Bhumarashuwa on 26 March 1997.

At the time of the 1991 Nepal census it had a population of 12,132 people living in 5000 individual households.

== Transportation ==
The town in connected to Indian border via Thadi in Nepal and Laukaha in India which is 51 km South of Gaighat are a part of one of the agreed route for Mutual Trade between India and Nepal. Nepal Government of Nepal has set up a dedicated customs office in the town. and Government of India has set up a Land Customs Station with a Superintendent level officer. So in simple Import and Export are allowed in this location. Laukaha has Laukaha Bazar railway station which is a big line and connects to rest of India.

== Administration ==
Gaighat (ward no. 11 & 12), Triyuga
Ward No.	Members	Name	Party
11	President	Sumanta Koirala	Nepali Congress
11	Member 1	Bhimchandra Rai	Nepali Congress
11	Member 2	Bishnu Kumar Shrestha	CPN (UML)
11	Female Member	Bimla Rai	Nepali Congress
11	Dalit Female Member	Nila Karki Dholi	Nepali Congress
12	President	Chudaraj Kafle	Nepali Congress
12	Member 1	Laxminarayan Chaudhary	Nepali Congress
12	Member 2	Dilsher Ali Miyan	Nepali Congress
12	Female Member	Anita Thapa	Nepali Congress
12	Dalit Female Member	Ramkali Vishwakarma	Nepali Congress

== See also ==
- Jogidaha
- Saune
