= Election Constituency Strategic Road =

Election Constituency Strategic Road (ECS Road) is a strategic road in Nepal; one such road is identified in each parliamentary constituency by its Member of Parliament. There are 165 Constituencies in Nepal so there are 165 ECS roads identified. The then Prime Minister KP Sharma Oli laid the foundation stone of the two-lane strategic road for all 165 constituencies at a formal program in Baluwatar on April 3, 2021

These ECR roads connect each constituency area with a National Highway passing nearby.

== List of roads ==
=== Koshi Province ===
Koshi Province
Constituency	Road Name	Details	Length	Note
Taplejung 1	Taplejung Constituency Road	Helipad–Buspark–Machhapokhari–Tamor Hiriya Dovan–Ojhagaun Liwang Kande–Thunglung Gumba Danda–Fungfunge–Bharuna Bandeltad–Simsime Danda–Pasim Doksa Pangri Tiptala Road		
Panchthar 1	Panchthar Constituency Road	Dashami Arubote Sarkedhobhana Bridge Limba Gumbadanda Road		
Ilam 1	Ilam 1 Constituency Road	Bhalukhop- Lakshmipur- Thakle Khudunabari road		
Ilam 2	Ilam 2 Constituency Road	Atmanand Marg- from Lakshmi Bandh to ward no. 6 Bihibare, from Guru Ashram Daya to Mangsebung Bhanjyang and from Bihibare to Palase Phulungi		
Jhapa 1	Jhapa 1 Constituency Road	Dhulawari (Radhadhami) to Bhavanachowk via Magneltar road	10 km (6 mi)	
Jhapa 2	Jhapa 2 Constituency Road	From Birtamod Mukti Chowk to Kaptanbari Chowk Pushpalal Chowk Vihibare of Shanishcher Road - Kharwandi Buddha Chowk Kalisthan Bazar Buddhshanti 2-Jaipur Wednesday Road	10 km (6 mi)	
Jhapa 3	Jhapa 3 Constituency Road	From Kachankawal 1 Ward Office to Rajgarh Bazar, Srijan Chowk, North Budhabare	10 km (6 mi)	
Jhapa 4	Jhapa 4 Constituency Road	Shivsattasi Municipality Ward No. 2 Tuesday Market East Regional Road from Batamankamana Boarding School) through North Pragati Chowk to Vikas Chowk to Dakshin Bal Seva Pvt., Himali Pvt. Through Sarasati Pvt. Road from South Haldar Chowk to East Shivganj Bazar Dharahara Chowk South from Shivganj Bazar to Area Police Office Agadi Nagar Circular Path	10 km (6 mi)	
Jhapa 5	Jhapa 5 Constituency Road	Kamal Ga. Pa. Guhwari School Rangpur-Wahpare School Chowk Bazar Gyan Bahadur Chowk-Damuna Bazar Road connecting Gajurgachi Damravhitta Jhapa	10 km (6 mi)	
Sankhuwasabha 1	Sankhuwasabha Constituency Road	Basantpur Tute Mude Shanishchre Chainpur Khandbari Road		
Tehrathum 1	Tehrathum Constituency Road	From Jirikhimti to Pauthak Bazar via Morahang road		
Bhojpur 1	Bhojpur Constituency Road	From Ranitar (Amchok RM) to Dudhkoshi coast- Hasanpur Chuharwesi via Arun River bank via Thulo Dumma, Sano Dumma Leguvaghat, Lamsuvaghat, Satighat via Waluvani, Majhuva Vesi Sanghutar through corridor of Ekhuwa River to Dobhane, Jowari via Solu connecting road		
Dhankuta 1	Dhankuta Constituency Road	Pakhriwas-Phalante-Bhojpur headquarters road		
Morang 1	Morang 1 Constituency Road	Belbari Faidani Lokhra Sagma Danda Road		
Morang 2	Morang 2 Constituency Road	Morang District Subarshi Municipality Sikti to Pathari Shanishare 5/6 road		
Morang 3	Morang 3 Constituency Road	Sundararaicha Na.Pa. 2 Karaibana Chowk Haraicha Bazar Chadnichowk Malechowk Sabhapur Sangli Einar; Bakaha Khola Road to Vyarwan Bazar Kushal Chowk Hasandah		
Morang 4	Morang 4 Constituency Road	Road to Belwari via Kathariko-4 New Bazar via Bhaudanha Balla Motipur Kasane		
Morang 5	Morang 5 Constituency Road	Rangeli- Ghadhi Bridge via Bahuban Satari Ghadhi Kholsi West South Border West Dropati Marg North Rangeli Kanepokhari and Ganesh M.B. of Rangeli. A road connecting the Rangeli-Jhapa Hulaki Road through the South Border and Amtola Satari to the west.		
Morang 6	Morang 6 Constituency Road	Gachhiya Lechani Sheshnarayan Divyadham		
Sunsari 1	Sunsari 1 Constituency Road	Barahkshetra Napa Ward No. 3 Road connecting Dharan-17 via Bharula Nadaha via Badge		
Sunsari 2	Sunsari 2 Constituency Road	Eenruwa N.P. From Sakhuwa Gachi to Ramdhuni N.P. Through Siddhapur through Dhakni Chan to Ramdhuni N.P. Road connecting Jhumka Bazar Highway		
Sunsari 3	Sunsari 3 Constituency Road	Chatra Main Canal of Etahari Sub-Metropolitan City from Lohani Chowk to Eenruwa No through South Canal. Pa. From Chadwela to Gadhi's Aurabani Chowk, close to B.P. From the chowk through the canal south of Barju to Das toll and Muslim toll from Sitaganj chowk to Nargara toll and the road from Bairia tol to Khaditol		
Sunsari 4	Sunsari 4 Constituency Road	From Sadanandan Mandal's house to Sadanand Shah's house to Babuni Shah's house to Koshi Tappu, Gulfaria, Shivchowk Katan road blacked		
Solukhumbu 1	Solukhumbu Constituency Road			
Khotang 1	Khotang Constituency Road	Chasmitar Salchautari Dikuwa Kurleghat		
Okhaldhunga 1	Okhaldhunga Constituency Road			
Udayapur 1	Udayapur 1 Constituency Road		18 km (11 mi)	
Udayapur 2	Udayapur 2 Constituency Road			
