= Triyuga Municipality =

Municipality in Nepal's Koshi Province

Triyuga Municipality त्रियुगा नगरपालिका
- Municipality
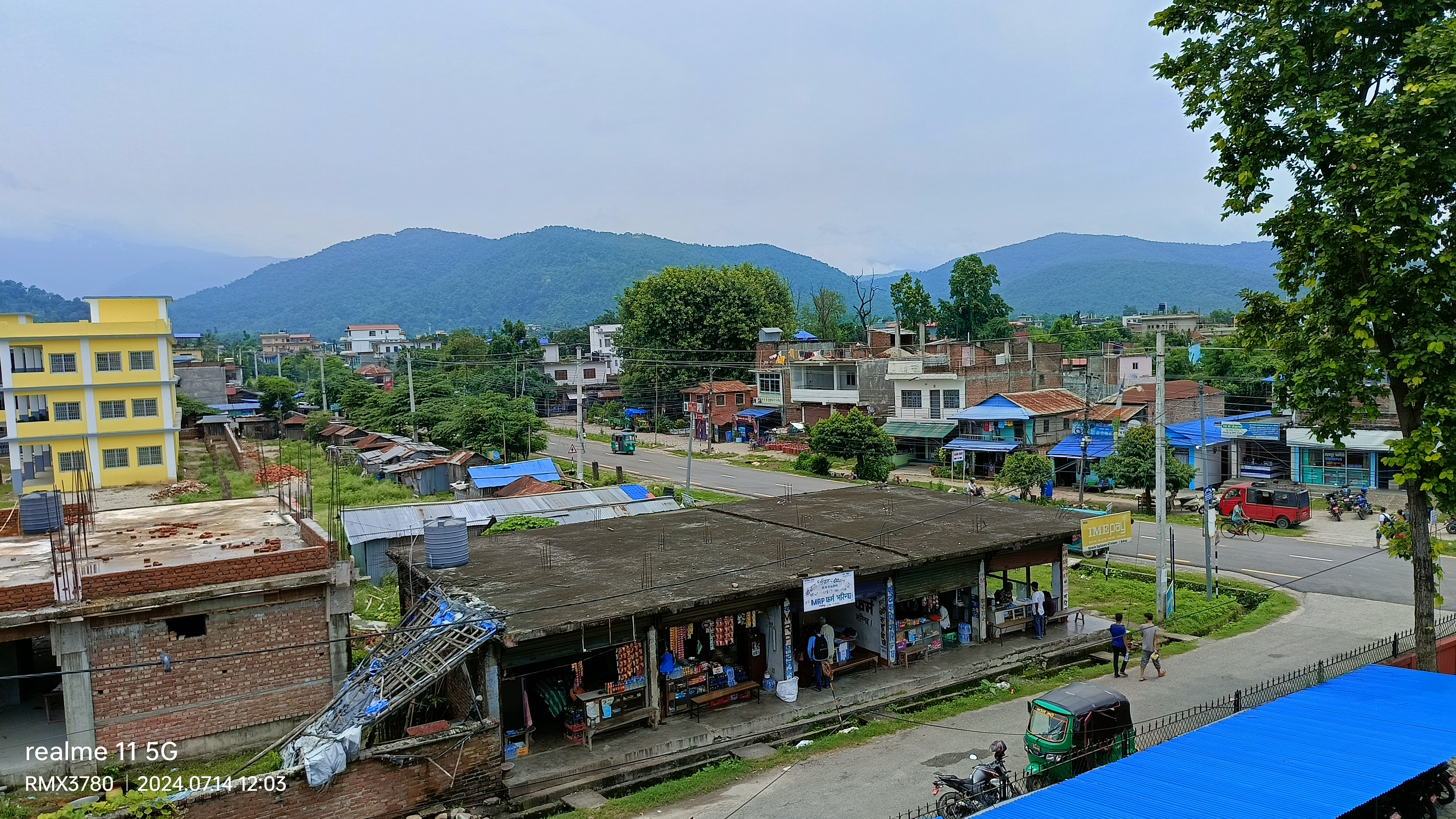
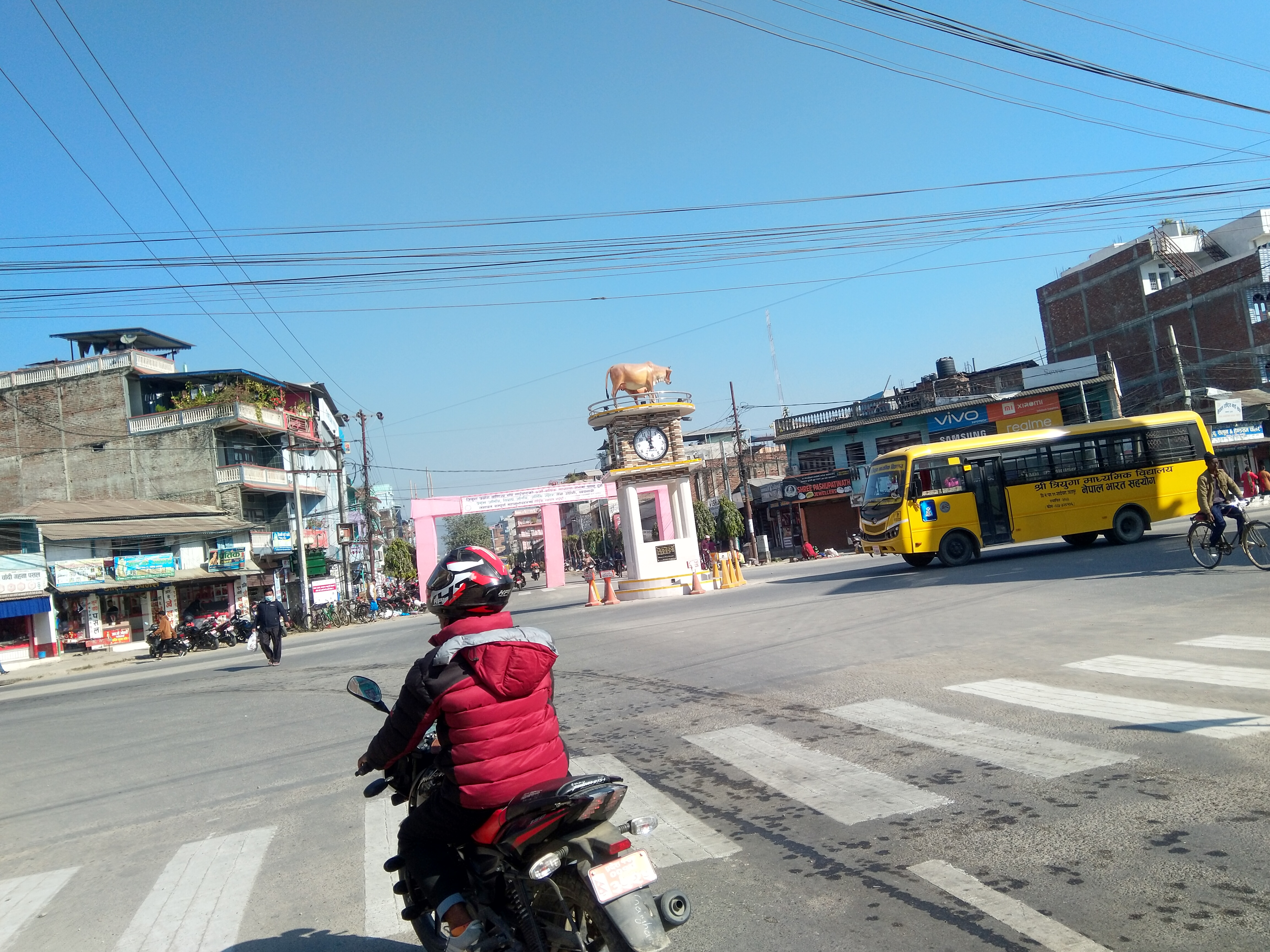
- Bokse in top, Gaighat main chok in bottom
- Location of Triyuga
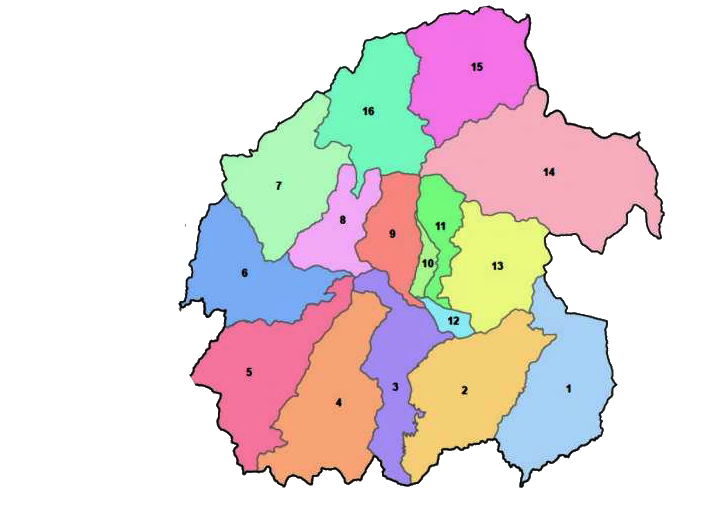
- Ward divisions of Triyuga
- Coordinates: 26°47′31″N 86°41′56″E
- Country: Nepal
- Province: Koshi Pradesh
- District: Udayapur
- No. of wards: 16
- Established: 26 March 1997
- Incorporated (VDC): Gaighat, Deuri, Bhumrasuwa, Jogidaha, Saune, Khanbu and Jalpachilaune
- Incorporated (date): 1997 & 2017
- Admin HQ.: Gaighat

Government
  - Type: Mayor–council
  - Body: Triyuga Municipality
  - Mayor: Mr. Basanta Kumar Basnet (NC)
  - Deputy Mayor: Mrs. Maheshwari Rai (CPN (UML))
  - MP & Constituency: Udayapur 1 Dr. Narayan Khadka (NC)
  - MLA & Constituency: Udayapur 1(B); Himal Karki (NC)

Area
  - Total: 547.43 km^{2} (211.36 sq mi)
  - Rank: 1st in province 3rd in Nepal

Population (2021)
  - Total: 103,475
  - Rank: ←
  - Density: 189.02/km^{2} (489.56/sq mi)
  - Households: 25,623

Demographics
  - Ethnic groups: Chhetri, Newar Tharu, Rai, Magar
  - Female ♀: 52.8%
  - Male ♂/100 female: 89.31%
- Time zone: UTC+05:45 (NPT)
- Postal Codes: 56300
- Telephone Code: 035
- Main Language(s): Nepali, Tharu, Sunuwar/Kiranti, Maithili, Magar, Gurung
- Website: www.triyugamun.gov.np
- Sagarmatha Airport is proposed, Nearest airport is Rajbiraj Airport (57 KM by road) operates daily flights to Kathmandu by Shree Airlines

Triyuga (Nepali: त्रियुगा) is one of the eight municipalities of Udayapur district of the Koshi Pradesh of Nepal. Gaighat is the headquarter of the municipality. According to the 2021 Nepal census the total population of the municipality is 103,475. It is divided into 16 wards. Triyuga Municipality was established on B.S. Chaitra 13, 2053 (26 March 1997). It was named after Triyuga River. A river which flows through the town. Triyuga is the 3rd largest municipality in Nepal and 1st largest in Koshi Pradesh in term of size (area). The total area of the municipality is 547.43 square kilometres (211.36 mi^{2}).

Almost all facilities are available in the town. Schools, colleges, Hospitals and clinics are available in the town. There are six police stations and armed police force in the town, and an army barrack is also situated in the city.

== Background ==
Triyuga municipality was established on 26 March 1997 merging 3 VDCs: e.g. Gaighat, Deuri and Bhumarashuwa. Total area of the municipality was 319.88 square kilometres (123.51 mi^{2}).

On 6 March 2017, the following VDCs added into Triyuga municipality: Jogidaha, Saune, Khanbu and Jalpachilaune, increasing the total area of the municipality is 547.43 square kilometres (211.36 sq mi).

== Ward division ==
Triyuga municipality is divided into 16 wards:

Ward No.	Admin. Centre	Area (km^{2})	Pop. 2011	Pop. 2021
1	Jogidaha	46.5	5115	4658
2	Motiyahi	47.15	6403	5830
3	Motigada	30.05	8630	9997
4	Salghari	48.38	5962	5666
5	Deuri	44.79	7745	6983
6	Jaljale	38.03	8217	8820
7	Chuhade	40.31	8145	6733
8	Rajabas	19.4	6565	5468
9	Gairun	19.4	5813	5575
10	Bokse	3.81	8394	8265
11	Gaighat	12.3	7932	11400
12	Old Gaighat	3.81	6311	7907
13	Dhik	33.49	6832	6386
14	Saune	76.97	3008	2312
15	Ranibas	44.13	4893	3541
16	Chilaune	38.9	4552	3184

== Geography ==
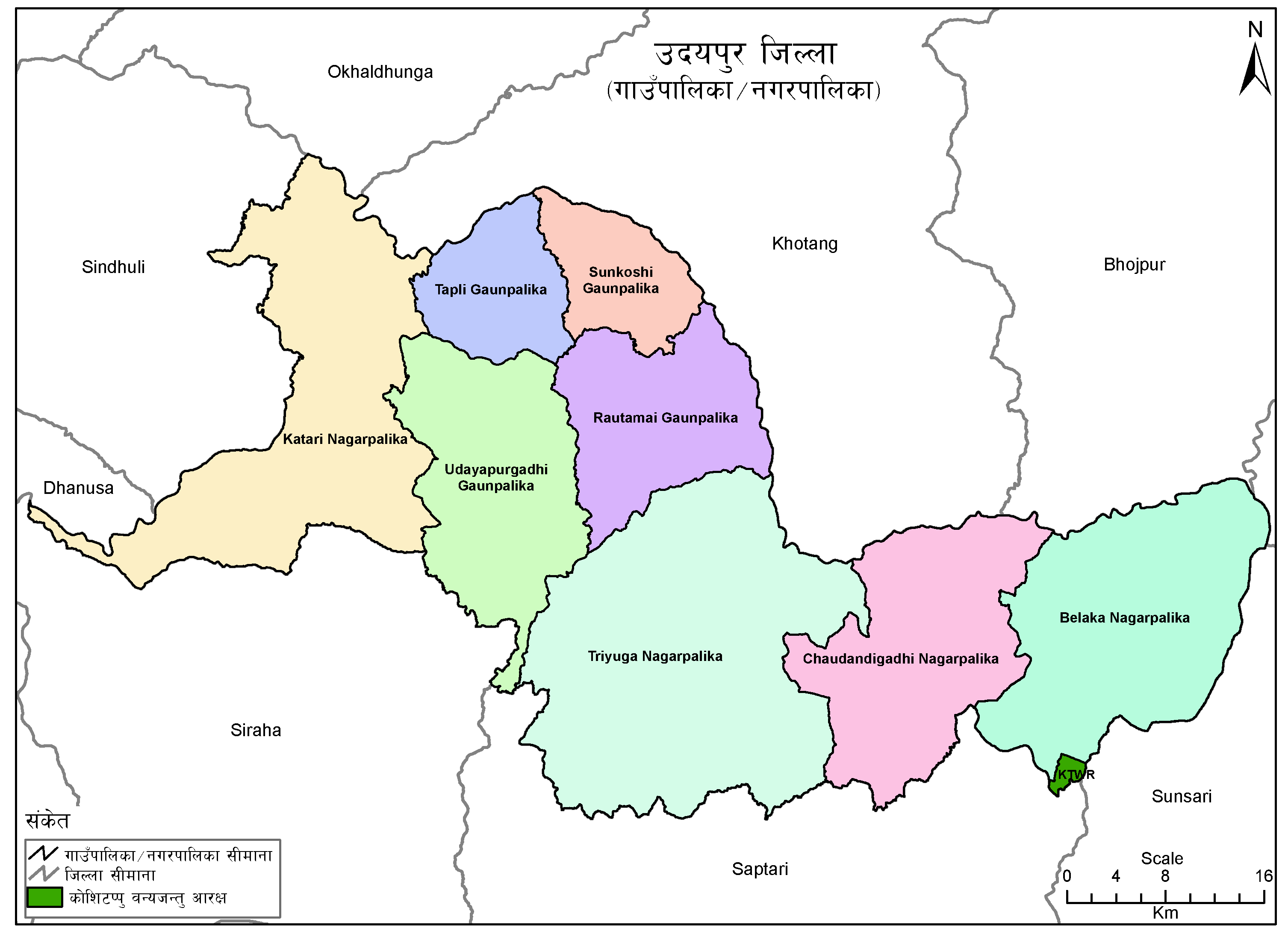

Triyuga is one municipality out of four municipalities of Udayapur District. The municipality is surrounded by Mahabharat hills in north and Churey hills in south. Udayapurgadhi and Rautamai are in north of the municipality, Khotang District is in north-east and Chaudandigadhi Municipality is in east. Saptari District is in south of Triyuga Municipality.

This city is in the famous Udayapur Valley. Gaighat (गाइघाट) (other name of Triyuga) is the shadow of a historic kingdom of Sen dynasty in Udayapurgadhi (Chaudandi). Gaighat is in the plane of the Valley. Udayapur Valley is the largest valley in eastern Nepal having fabulous natural attractions such as the Triyuga river, Baruwa river flowing through the town. Koshi River is east of the city.

== Demographics ==
=== 2011 ===
Ethnic castes in Triyuga
1. Chetri (24.2%)
2. Tharu (14.9%)
3. Rai (12.4%)
4. Magar (9.04%)
5. Bahun (7.74%)
6. Other (31.6%)

The total population of the municipality, as of 2011 Nepal census is 87,557 in which male comprises 41,221 and female 46,336. There are 19,484 households. 74% of people of the municipality is educated. 82% male and 66.5% female are educated.

Chetri is the largest group of caste in Triyuga municipality which comprises 24.24% of people of total population of Triyuga. The second largest group of caste is Tharu people which comprises 14.91%. Rai 12.43%, Magar 9.04%, Bahun (Hill Brahman) 7.74% comprises total population of the municipality.

Nepali language is the mostly spoken language in Triyuga, which is spoken by 55.82% of people. Tharu language is secondly most spoken language, Maithili language is third most spoken language and Magar is fourth.

=== 2021 ===
The total population of Triyuga municipality in 2021 has been increased compared to 2011 Nepal census. According to the 2021 Nepal census, there are 102,725 people living here in 25623 households. The number of males comprises 48463 (47.2%) while females are 54262 (52.8%). Sex ratio is 89.31/100 female. 188 people live per square km.

Ethnically Chettri is the largest group in this rural municipality following Tharu second largest, Rai at third, Magar at fourth and Bahun at fifth position.

Religiously Hindu is the largest group with 77.3% and Kirat Mundhum is the second largest group with 9.1%, Buddhist at third number with 8%.

Ethnic groups according to (2021)
1. Chhetri (26.3%)
2. Tharu (13.9%)
3. Rai (12.5%)
4. Magar (8.30%)
5. Bahun (5.80%)
6. Danuwar (4.50%)
7. Bishwakarma (4.40%)
8. Tamang (3.40%)
9. Newar (3.00%)
10. Others (17.9%)

Religious group
	percentage
Hindu	77.3%
Kirat Mundhum	9.1%
Buddhist	8%
Christian	2.1%
Islam	1.7%
Others	1.8%

80% of the total population are literate which means they can read and write but only 13.2% of people have passed SEE.

Education
	percentage
Basic	4.7%
primary	27.7%
secondary	34%
SEE	13.2%
10+2	12.6%
Graduate & above	5.1%

Nepali is the most spoken language in this municipality with 55.3%, Tharu is second with 14.6%, Maithili is third with 7% and Magar is at fourth with 6.5%. Chamling, Tamang, Rai, Danuwar and Nepal bhasha are other minor languages that are also spoken in this municipality.

Languages
	percentage
Nepali	55.3%
Tharu	14.6%
Maithili	7%
Magar	6.5%

== Education ==
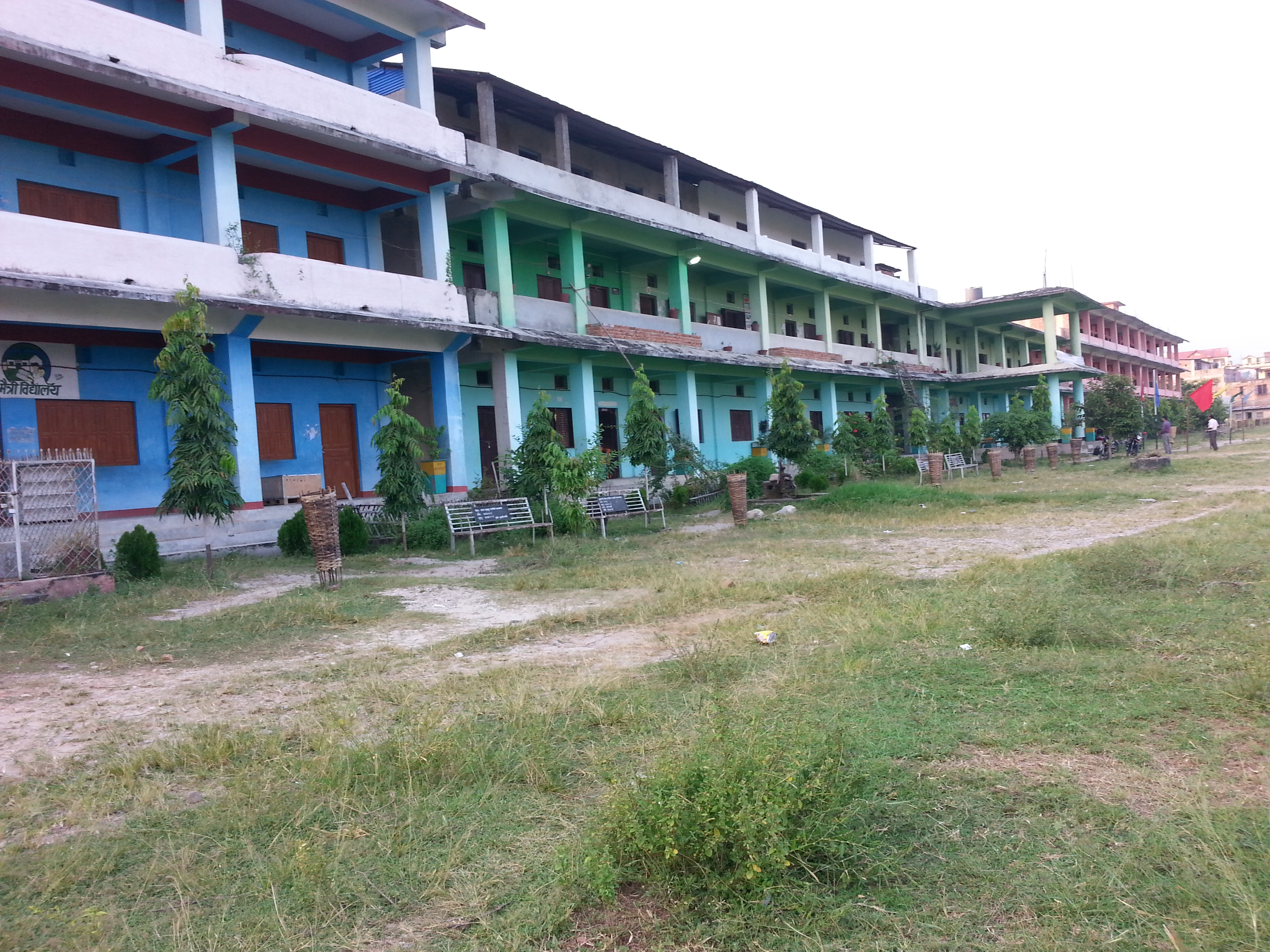
Triyuga higher secondary school

Campuses for higher education are available at Gaighat. Triyuga Janata Multiple Campus provides undergraduate and post graduate education on management and social sciences. Baruwa Campus provides undergraduate education, management and science. Similarly Udayasi English higher secondary school provides intermediate education on science and management. There are numerous other schools for education. Triyuga Janta Multiple Campus was established in 1987 (2044 BS) as a public campus.

== Sports & Leisures ==
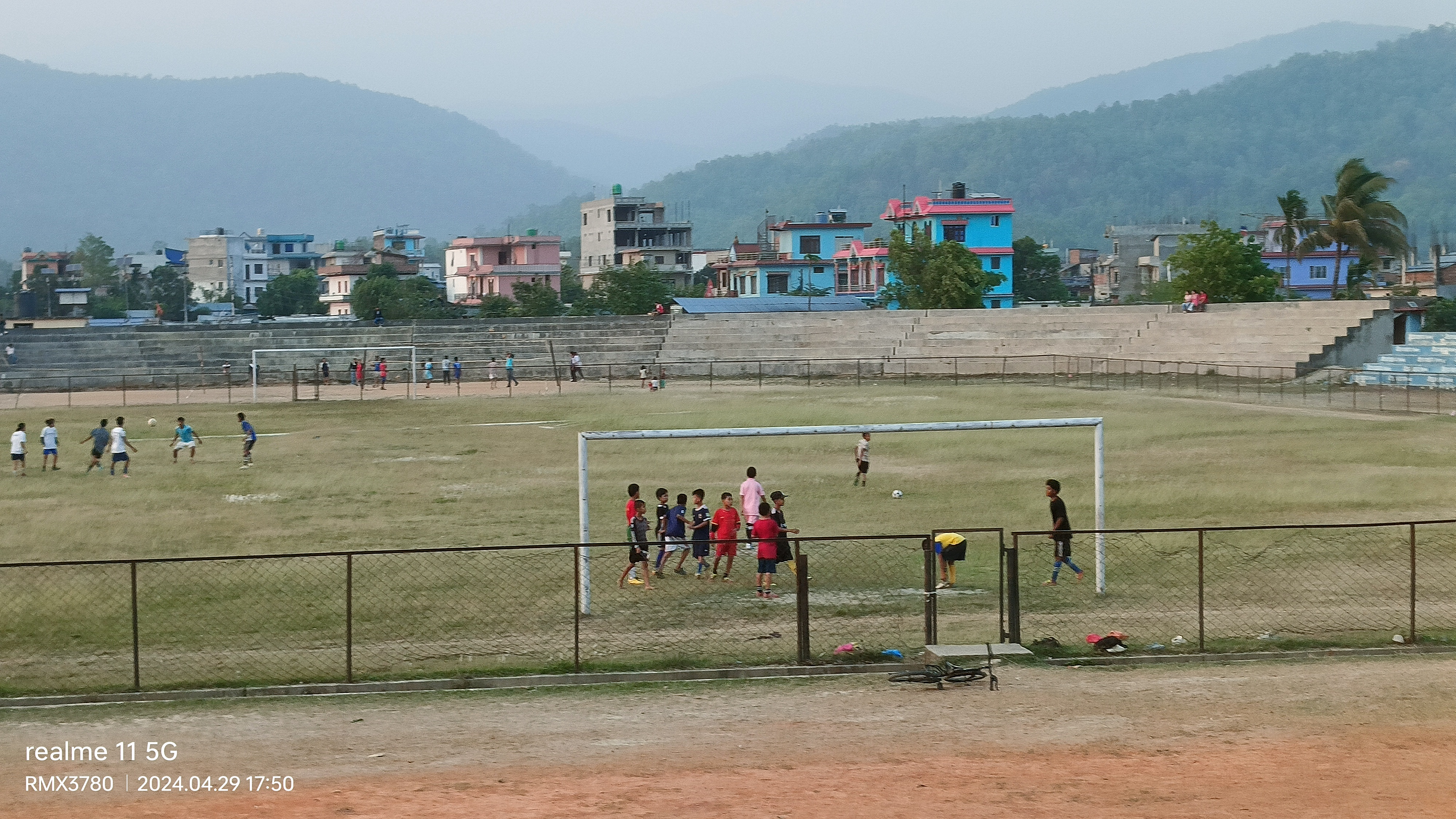
A football ground (Tharuhat Stadium)

Tharuhat Rangsala

Football, cricket and Cycling are the most popular sports in Gaighat. Tharuhat Rangsala with a capacity of 10,000+ spectators is the largest football stadium in the city. The Udayapur Gold Cup, is held in the stadium with National Football Clubs as well as District Clubs. There is a covered hall at Bokse, where indoor events can be organized.

== Transportation ==
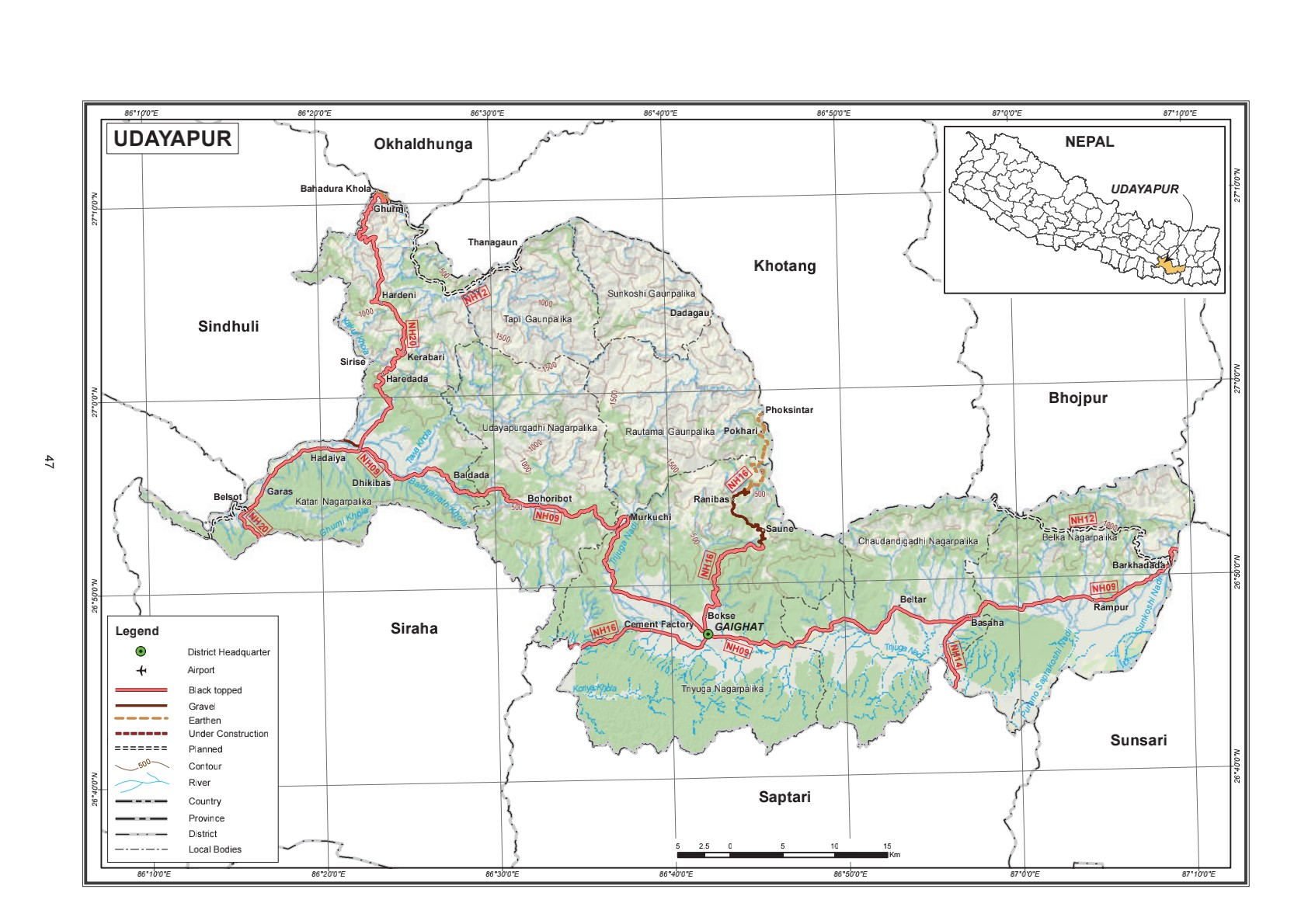
Road and Highway map of Udayapur District

The Sagarmatha Highway (NH-16) via Thadi Border, (Saptari) connects Gaighat to Bihar (India). Mahendra Highway (NH-01) crosses NH-16 at Kadmah-Lahan (Saptari) which connects Gaighat with all other parts of the country. NH-16 also connects Gaighat to Khotang and Solukhumbu Districts. Likewise Madan Bhandari Highway (NH-09) goes through the city which connects Dharan in the East and Sindhuli in the west. The highway is opened after the completion of chatara bridge over Koshi.

Public buses are available from Kathmandu, Biratnagar, Kakarbhitta and other cities to move to the city. Local transportation is available within the town. Many small local routes have public transport facilities. Tempos and taxis are available for rent too. Sagarmatha airport is proposed to be constructed in the city.

=== Nearest airports ===
- Rajbiraj Airport (57 km by road)
- Janakpur Airport (116 km by road)
- Biratnagar Airport (138 km by road)

Rajbiraj Airport is the nearest airport, roughly 57 km away. Shree Airlines and Buddha Air operates daily flights between Rajbiraj and Kathmandu

The town in connected to Indian border via Thadi in Nepal and Laukaha in India which is 51 km South of Gaighat are a part of one of the agreed route for Mutual Trade between India and Nepal. Nepal Government of Nepal has set up a dedicated customs office in the town. and Government of India has set up a Land Customs Station with a Superintendent level officer. Laukaha has Laukaha Bazar railway station which is a big line and connects to rest of India via Train and NH57 via road.

== Media ==
National daily newspapers like Kantipur, The Kathmandu Post, Annapurna post, The Himalayan Times, Nagarik, Republica, Gorkhapatra are available in early morning. Local television named G-music is broadcast via cable. To promote local cultures Triyuga has FM radio stations Radio Triyuga 104 MHz, Radio Udayapur 102 MHz and which are Community radio Stations. Radio Amurta 91.6 is a commercial fm station in Tyiyuga. Cable television service is also available. Many local newspapers are published in the town on daily, weekly basis. Some of them are Majhkharka, Triyuga post, Baruwa Times.

== Gallery ==
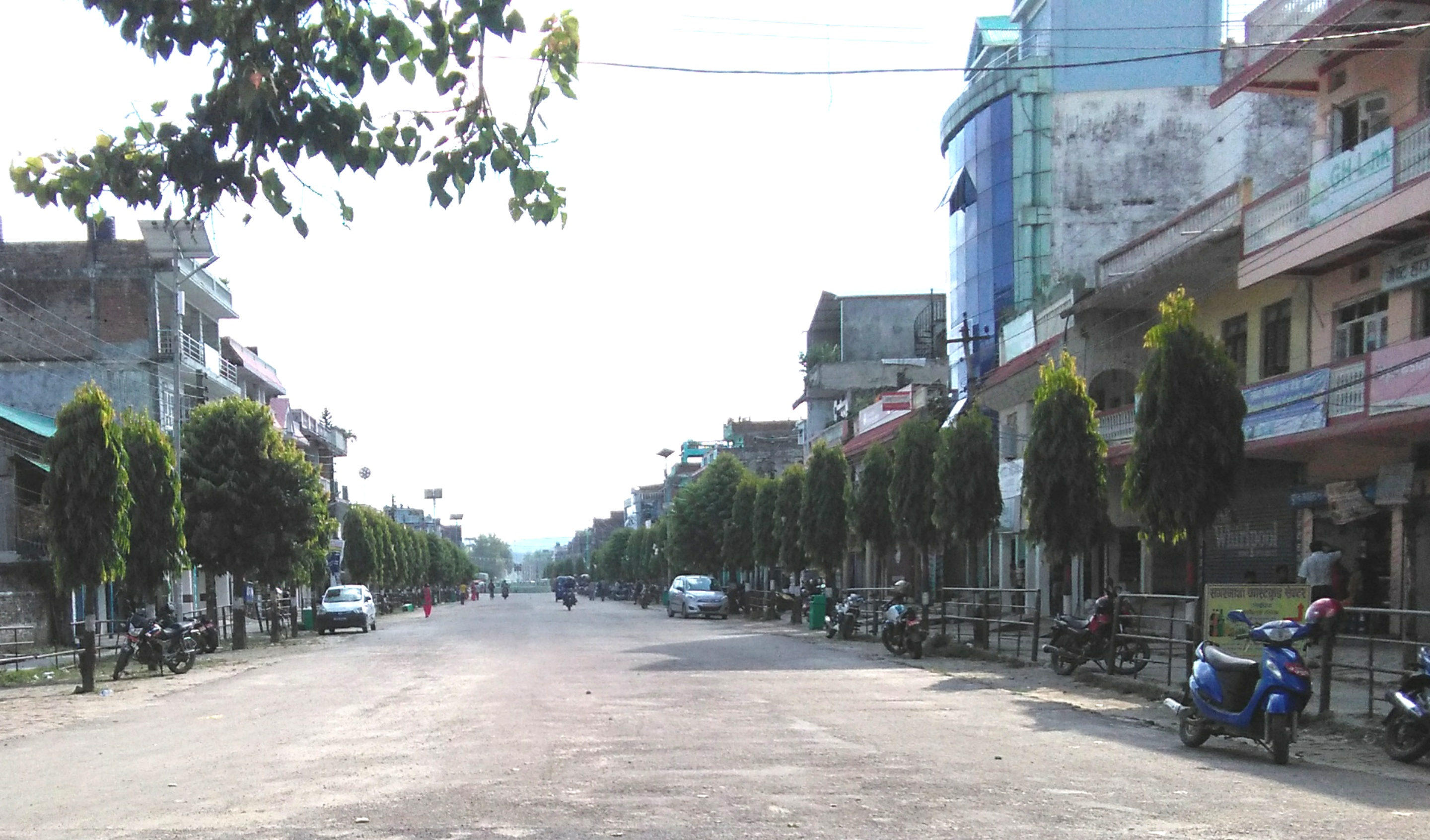
A view of a street to main chowk, Gaighat Bazar from Pipal Chowk

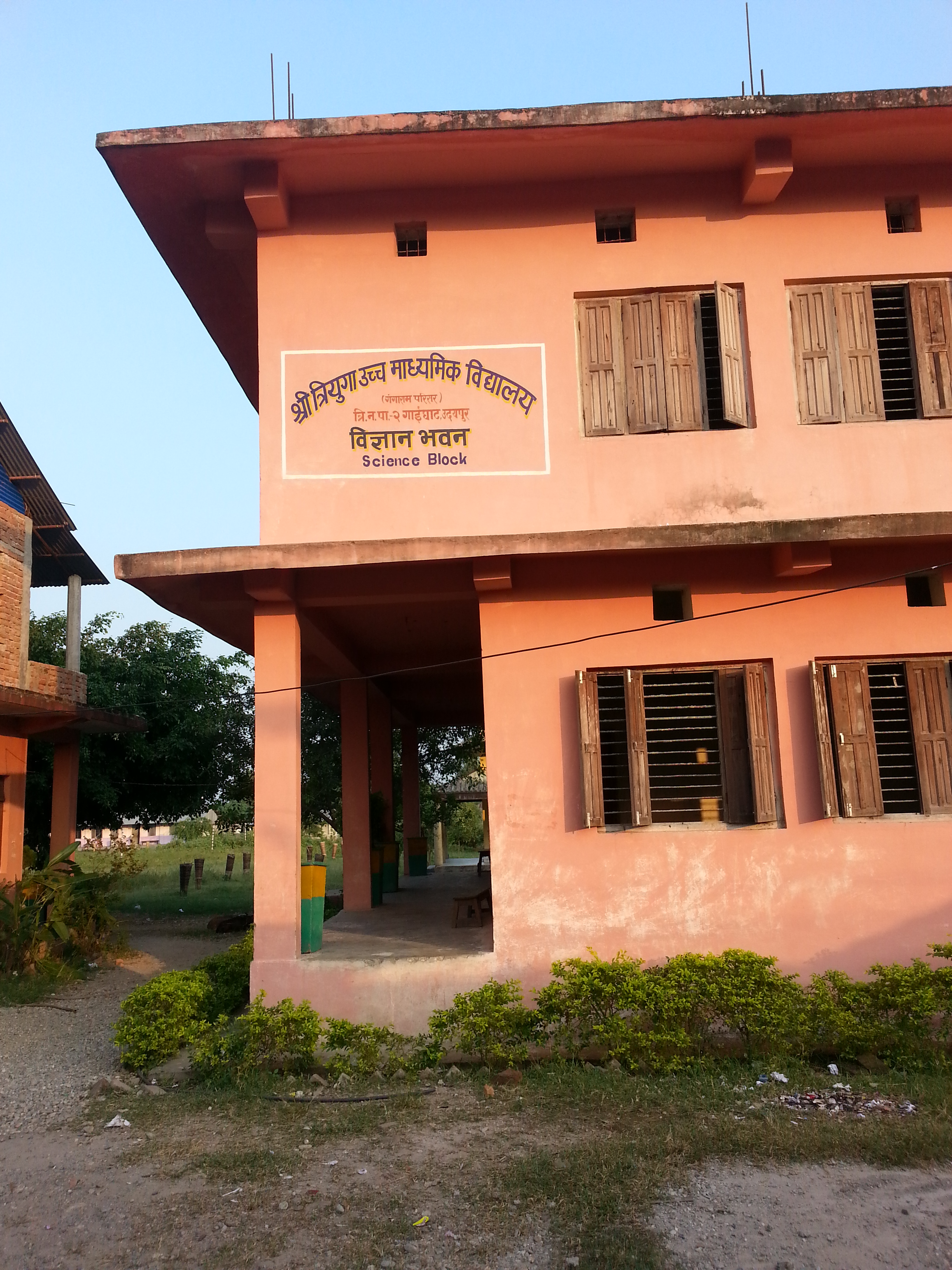
Triyuga higher secondary school

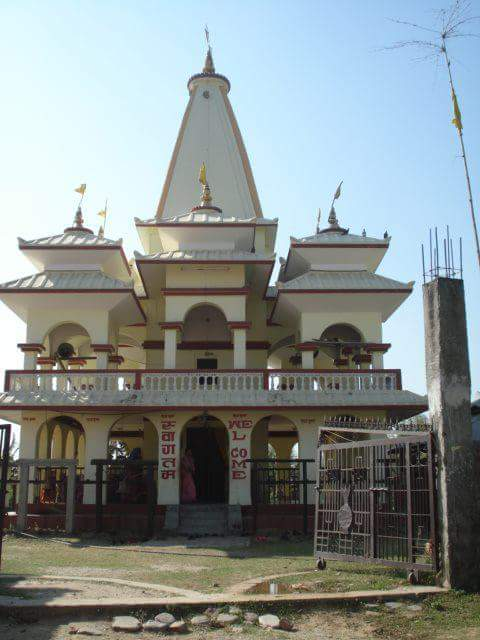
Radha-Krishna Temple

== See also ==
- Katari
- Belaka
- Chaudandigadhi
