= Jalpachilaune =

Jalpachilaune जाल्पा चिलाउने
- Ward
- Location in Nepal Jalpachilaune (Nepal)
- Coordinates: 26.88°N 86.67°E
- Country: Nepal
- Province: Province No. 1
- District: Udayapur District
- Municipality: Triyuga
- Located in: Ward no. 16
- Established as VDC in: 1990
- Incorporated: 10 March 2017

Population (2011)
  - Total: 3,864
- Time zone: UTC+5:45 (Nepal Time)

Jalpachilaune (ward no. 16) is a populated place located in Triyuga municipality of Udayapur District in Province No. 1 of Nepal. At the time of 2011 Nepal census it had a population of 3,864 people living in 807 individual households.

Previously, Jalpachilaune was a separate village development committee in Udayapur District of Sagarmatha Zone in Eastern Region of Nepal. At the time of the 1991 Nepal census it had a population of 2,775 people living in 495 individual households.

Fulfilling the requirement of the new Constitution of Nepal 2015, MoFALD replaced all old VDCs and Municipalities into 753 new local level body (Municipality), thus Khanbu was merged with Triyuga Municipality.

== See also ==
- Jogidaha
- Saune
- Khanbu
