= Jogidaha =

Former Village Development Committee in Nepal

Jogidaha जोगीदह
- Ward
- Location in Nepal Jogidaha (Nepal)
- Coordinates: 26.75°N 86.77°E
- Country: Nepal
- Province: Province No. 1
- District: Udayapur District
- Municipality: Triyuga
- Established: 2017
- Established as VDC in: 1990
- Incorporated: 10 March 2017

Government
  - Type: Ward
  - Ward chairperson: Mr. Manoj Kumar Chaudhari

Area
  - Total: 46.5 km^{2} (18.0 sq mi)

Population (2011)
  - Total: 4,059
  - Density: 87.3/km^{2} (226/sq mi)
- Time zone: UTC+5:45 (Nepal Time)
- Postal code: 56300
- Area code: 035

Jogidaha (ward no. 1 of Triyuga municipality) is a populated place located in Triyuga municipality of Udayapur District in Province No. 1 of Nepal. At the time of 2011 Nepal census it had a population of 6,665 people living in 1,451 individual households.

Previously, Jogidaha was a separate village development committee in Udayapur District of Sagarmatha Zone in Eastern Region. At the time of the 1991 Nepal census it had a population of 4698 people living in 872 individual households.

Fulfilling the requirement of the new Constitution of Nepal 2015, MoFALD replaced all old VDCs and Municipalities into 753 new local level body (Municipality), thus Jogidah was merged with Triyuga Municipality. Jogidah was arranged into two wards of Triyuga municipality, some part carved out from Jogidah and merged with ward no. 2 (Motiyahi) so total area of Jogidah (Ward no. 1) remained 46.5 km² and total population was 4059.

== Administration ==
Jogidaha (ward no. 1), Triyuga
Members	Name	Party
Ward president	Manoj Kumar Chaudhary	NC
Member 1	Arjun Kumar Chaudhary	NC
Member 2	Tej Bahadur Basnet	NC
Female Member	Shyam Kumari Rai	NC
Dalit Female Member	Arti Sada	NC

== See also ==
- Saune
- Khanbu
- Jalpachilaune
