= Saune =

Saune साउने
- Ward
- Location in Nepal Saune (Nepal)
- Coordinates: 26.86°N 86.78°E
- Country: Nepal
- Province: Province No. 1
- District: Udayapur District
- Municipality: Triyuga
- Located in: Ward no. 14
- Established as VDC in: 1990
- Incorporated: 10 March 2017

Government
  - Type: Ward (electoral division)
  - Ward President: Himraj Magar

Area
  - Total: 76.97 km^{2} (29.72 sq mi)

Population (2011)
  - Total: 2,678
  - Density: 34.79/km^{2} (90.11/sq mi)
- Time zone: UTC+5:45 (Nepal Time)

Saune (ward no. 14) is a populated place located in Triyuga municipality of Udayapur District in Province No. 1 of Nepal. At the time of 2011 Nepal census it had a population of 2,678 people living in 518 individual households.

Previously, Saune was a separate village development committee in Udayapur District of Sagarmatha Zone in Eastern Region of Nepal. At the time of the 1991 Nepal census it had a population of 1753 people living in 297 individual households.

Fulfilling the requirement of the new Constitution of Nepal 2015, MoFALD replaced all old VDCs and Municipalities into 753 new local level body (Municipality), thus Saune was merged with Triyuga Municipality.

== Administration ==
Saune (ward no. 14), Triyuga
Members	Name	Party
Ward president	Himraj Magar	CPN (Mao Cent)
Member	Ek Bahadur Katuwal	CPN (Mao Cent)
Female Member	Rekha Thapa Magar	CPN (Mao Cent)
Dalit Female Member	Keshari Maya Nepali	CPN (Mao Cent)

== See also ==
- Jogidaha
- Khanbu
- Jalpachilaune
