= Bhumarashuwa =

Former Village Development Committee in Nepal

Bhumarashuwa भूमरसुवा
- Village development committee
- Country: Nepal
- Zone: Sagarmatha Zone
- District: Udayapur District

Population (1991)
  - Total: 13,631
- Time zone: UTC+5:45 (Nepal Time)

Bhumarashuwa is a village development committee in Udayapur District in the Sagarmatha Zone of south-eastern Nepal. At the time of the 1991 Nepal census it had a population of 13,631 people living in 2531 individual households.
