= Sandakpur Rural Municipality =

Sandakpur सन्दकपुर गाउँपालिका
- Rural Municipality
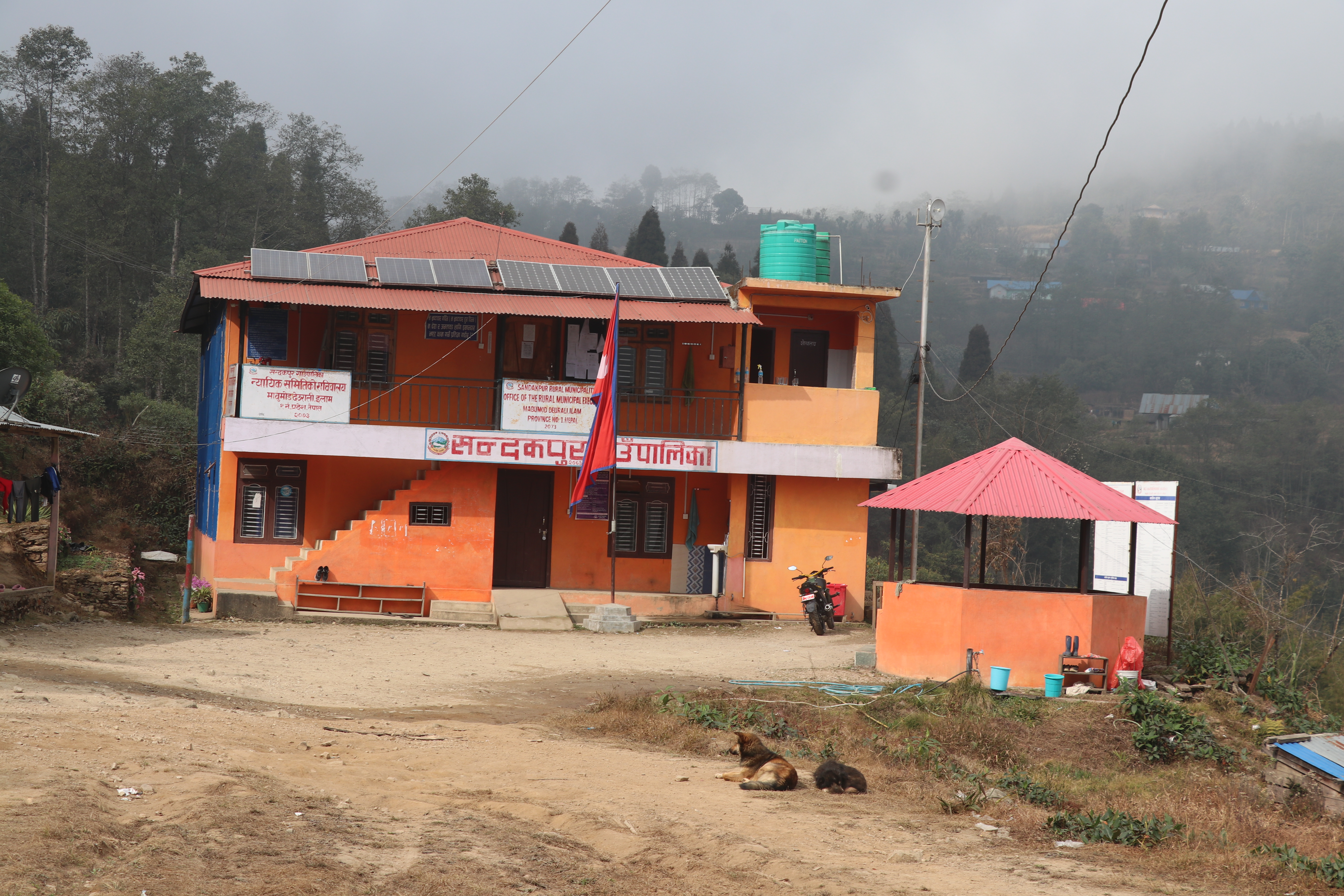
- Office Building of Sandakpur Rural Municipality

- Location in Koshi Province Sandakpur (Nepal)
- Coordinates: 27.05°N 87.90°E
- Province: Koshi Province
- District: Ilam
- Wards: 5
- Established: 10 March 2017
- Seat: Maipokhari

Government
  - Type: Village Council
  - Chairperson: Mr. Tularam Gurung (Nepali Congress)
  - Vice-chairperson: Mr. Hari Bahadur Lungeli (CPN(Unified Socialist)

Area
  - Total: 156.01 km^{2} (60.24 sq mi)
- Highest elevation: 3,636 m (11,929 ft)

Population (2021)
  - Total: 15,444
  - Density: 98.994/km^{2} (256.39/sq mi)
- Time zone: UTC+5:45 (Nepal Standard Time)
- Postal Code: 57309
- Website: official website

Sandakpur (Nepali: सन्दकपुर गाउँपालिका) is one of the six rural municipalities (gaunpalika) located in Ilam District of Koshi Province, Nepal. Ilam District comprises ten municipalities in total, of which four are urban and six rural. Sandakpur is known for its high-altitude landscapes, biodiversity, and the famous Maipokhari Ramsar Site.

== History ==
Sandakpur Rural Municipality was established on 10 March 2017 as part of the nationwide restructuring of local bodies mandated by the Constitution of Nepal 2015. The restructuring replaced all former Village Development Committees (VDCs) with 753 new local-level units.

The former VDCs of Maimajhuwa, Mabu, Sulubung, Maipokhari, and Jamuna were merged to form Sandakpur Rural Municipality.

== Geography ==
Sandakpur lies in the hilly and mountainous region of eastern Nepal. The municipality includes elevations ranging from mid-hills to the high-altitude Sandakpur Peak, which reaches approximately 3,636 metres. The area is rich in biodiversity, dense forests, and freshwater wetlands.

The Maipokhari wetland, located within the municipality, is listed as a Ramsar site due to its ecological significance. The region experiences a cool, subtropical highland climate with misty forests and frequent cloud cover.

== Demographics ==
According to the 2021 census, Sandakpur has a total population of 15,444.

The municipality is home to diverse ethnic groups including Rai, Limbu, Tamang, Sherpa, Magar, and Chhetri communities. Nepali is the most widely spoken language, followed by Limbu, Rai, and Tamang languages. The major religions practiced are Hinduism, Kirat, and Buddhism.

== Administration ==
Sandakpur Rural Municipality is divided into five wards. The administrative headquarters is located in Maipokhari. The local government is headed by an elected chairperson and vice-chairperson, along with ward representatives.

== Economy ==
Agriculture is the primary economic activity in Sandakpur. Major crops include tea, cardamom, ginger, potatoes, and various seasonal vegetables. The region is part of Ilam’s renowned tea-producing belt.

Tourism also contributes significantly to the local economy. Popular attractions include Sandakpur Peak, Maipokhari Ramsar Site, dense rhododendron forests, and panoramic viewpoints offering sights of Mount Everest and Kangchenjunga.

== Tourism ==
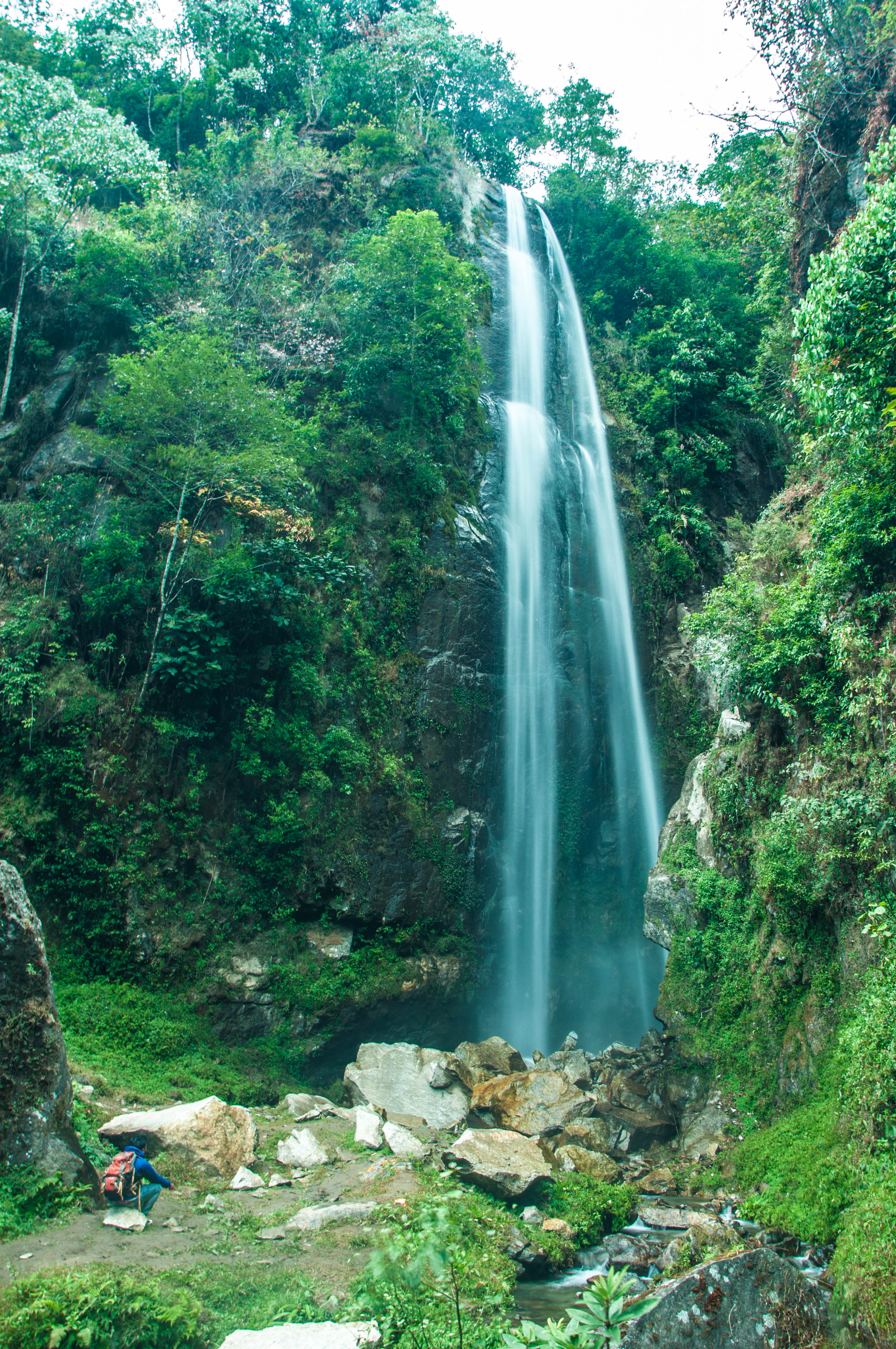
Todke waterfall

Sandakpur Rural Municipality is known for its natural beauty, high-altitude landscapes, wetlands, and trekking routes. Several notable tourist destinations lie within the municipality:

- Sandakpur Peak – A high ridge located at an elevation of about 3,636 metres, offering panoramic views of Himalayan peaks.
- Mai Pokhari – A freshwater wetland listed as a Ramsar Site, famous for its biodiversity and religious significance.
- Todke waterfall – One of Nepal’s tallest waterfalls, situated in a forested area with scenic surroundings.
- Jaubari – A viewpoint from where snow-covered Himalayan ranges can be seen up close.
- Chhintapu – A trekking area known for its dense rhododendron forests and habitat of the endangered red panda.
- Various natural ponds – Including Dhap Pokhari, Kal Pokhari, Fushre Pokhari, Lam Pokhari, and Jor Pokhari.

=== Trekking Routes ===
Several trekking routes connect Ilam Bazaar with Sandakpur Rural Municipality:

- Ilam Bazaar → Maipokhari → Maimajhuwa → Sandakpur Peak – The most popular route, passing through forests, wetlands, and high ridges.
- Ilam Bazaar → Todke Jharana → Sulubung → Sandakpur – A scenic trail that includes Todke Waterfall.
- Ilam Bazaar → Jaubari → Sandakpur – A shorter but steeper ascent offering close Himalayan views.
- Ilam Bazaar → Chhintapu → Sandakpur – A biodiversity-rich trail known for rhododendron forests and red panda habitat.

== Transportation ==
Sandakpur is connected to Ilam Bazaar by rural roads accessible by jeeps and local buses. Road conditions vary seasonally, with monsoon rains affecting accessibility. The nearest major town is Ilam Bazaar, which serves as the commercial hub for the region.

== Wards ==
Sandakpur Rural Municipality consists of the following five wards:

1. Maimajhuwa
2. Mabu
3. Sulubung
4. Maipokhari
5. Jamuna
