= Mangalbare =

Mangalbare, Ilam मंगलबारे
- Deumai Municipality
- Location in Nepal Mangalbare, Ilam (Nepal)
- Coordinates: 26.95°N 87.84°E
- Country: Nepal
- Province: Province No. 1
- District: Ilam District

Government
  - Chair Person: Vim Lal Khanal

Population (1991)
  - Total: 5,593
- Time zone: UTC+5:45 (Nepal Time)
- Postal code: 57307
- Area code: 027

Mangalbare is a town located in the Deumai municipality in Ilam District in the Province No. 1 of eastern Nepal. At the time of the 1991 Nepal census it had a population of 5,593 persons living in 1005 individual households. Now, Mangalbare and dhuseni have become municipality combinedly & has been named as Deumai municipality. There are many beautiful places like Panitar, Gajurmukhi, Deumai river, Gufathumki, etc. People are engaged in Agriculture & some owns shop. Mangalbare bazaar is the hub centre for the neighbors like jitpur, dhuseni, Shantidanda, sangrumba, and Phuyatappa. This area is very fertile for the commercial crops such as cardamom, tea, ginger, as well as many horticultural commodities.Deumai Municipality Head office is located in Mangalbare.
