= Phakphokthum Rural Municipality =

Phakphokthum फाकफोकथुम गाउँपालिका
- Rural Municipality
- Location in Province No. 1 Phakphokthum (Nepal)
- Coordinates: 26°59′5.81″N 87°43′10.2″E
- Province: Koshi Province
- District: Ilam
- Wards: 7
- Established: 10 March 2017
- Seat: Phakphok

Government
  - Type: Village Council
  - Chairperson: Mr. Ram Shrestha (NC)
  - Vice-chairperson: Mrs. Saraswati Rai (NCP)

Area
  - Total: 108.79 km^{2} (42.00 sq mi)

Population (2011)
  - Total: 21,619
  - Density: 198.72/km^{2} (514.69/sq mi)
- Time zone: UTC+5:45 (Nepal Standard Time)
- Area code: 027
- Website: official website

Phakphokthum (Nepali: फाकफोकथुम) is one of the six rural municipalities (Nepali: गाउँपालिका; gaunpalika) located in Ilam District of Koshi Province, Nepal. Out of Ilam's total 10 municipalities, six are rural and four urban.

According to Ministry of Federal Affairs and Local Development, Phakphokthum has an area of 108.79 square kilometres (42.00 mi^{2}) and the population of the municipality is 21,619 as of the 2011 Nepal census.

It has 7 wards. Phakphok is the municipal headquarters.

== History ==
Phakphokthum was a village development committee named Phakphok located in the Mechi Zone. Fulfilling the requirement of the new Constitution of Nepal 2015, Ministry of Federal Affairs and Local Development converted all VDCs and Municipalities into 753 new local level bodies. Phakphok turned into a rural municipality as Phakphokthum and the adjoining village development committees added to this. The adjoining VDCs added to this were: Amchok, Phuyatappa, Lumde, Ektappa and Chamaita.

== Economy ==
The major occupation of the people in this rural municipality is agriculture.

== Governance ==
Phakphokthum lies in constituency number 2 of Ilam district. Subash Nemwang was elected as a member of parliament in the election of 2017. This is one of the most remote villages of the District.

== Transport ==
The Damak-Rabi Phagunanda road connects the municipality through shortest way with the southern plains. The span of the highway is about 45 km.

== Demographics ==
At the time of the 2011 Nepal census Phakphokthum Rural Municipality had a population of 21,619. Of these, 40.3% spoke Nepali, 20.7% Limbu, 11.5% Rai, 11.4% Magar, 5.4% Bantawa, 3.7% Tamang, 2.8% Newar, 1.4% Sunwar, 0.6% Gurung, 0.2% Bhujel, 0.2% Chamling, 0.2% Sampang, 0.1% Hindi, 0.1% Kulung, 0.1% Maithili, 0.1% Sherpa and 1.0% other languages as their first language.

In terms of ethnicity/caste, 21.0% were Limbu, 19.6% Chhetri, 18.4% Rai, 11.8% Magar, 11.7% Hill Brahmin, 3.8% Kami, 3.8% Tamang, 3.2% Newar, 1.6% Damai/Dholi, 1.5% Sunuwar, 1.0% Sanyasi/Dasnami, 0.8% Gharti/Bhujel, 0.7% Gurung, 0.4% Sarki, 0.1% Bote, 0.1% Terai Brahmin, 0.1% Sherpa and 0.5% others.

In terms of religion, 47.0% Hindu, 38.1% Kirati, 14.0% Buddhist, 0.5% Christian, 0.1% Prakriti and 0.2% others.

In terms of literacy, 75.4% could read and write, 2.7% could only read and 21.8% could neither read nor write.

== See also ==
- Ilam District
