= Ilam Municipality =

Ilam इलाम Charkhola
- Municipality
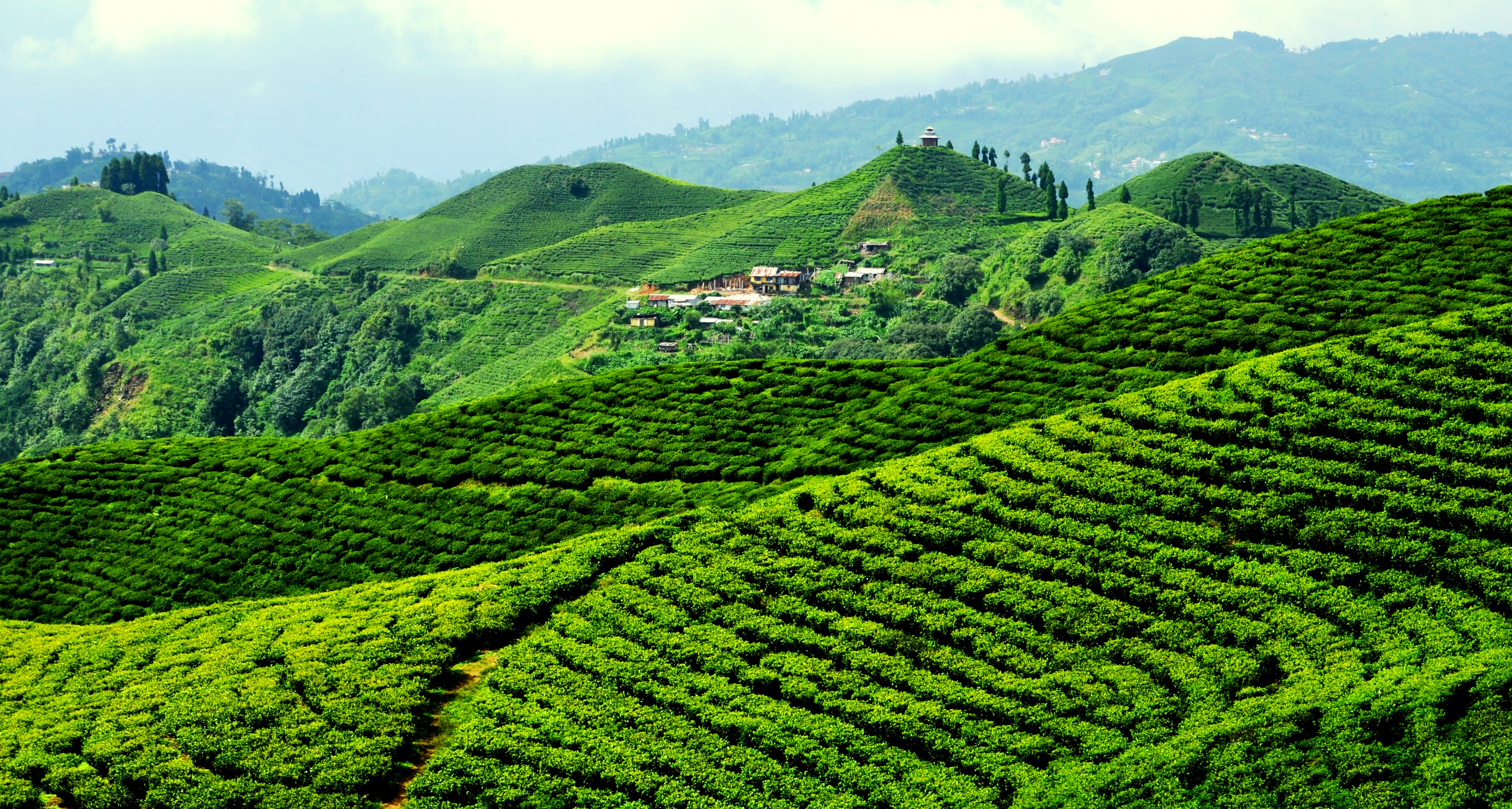
- Lush Green Tea Gardens are what makes Ilam district popular.
- Motto(s): Clean, Prosperous, Cultured Ilam
- Location in Koshi province Ilam (Nepal)
- Coordinates: 26°54′30″N 87°55′35″E
- Country: Nepal
- Province: Koshi Province
- District: Ilam District
- Established as Gauda: 1818 (1875 BS)
- Established as Municipality: 1958

Government
  - Mayor: Kedar Thapa (NC)
  - Deputy Mayor: Bishnu Kumari Limbu (NC)

Area
  - Total: 173.32 km^{2} (66.92 sq mi)
- Elevation: 1,627 m (5,338 ft)

Population (2021)
  - Total: 50,085
  - Density: 288.97/km^{2} (748.44/sq mi)
  - Ethnicities: Limbu; Rai; Lepcha; Yakkha; Sunuwar; Gurung
  - Religions: Kiratism Hinduism and Buddhist
- Time zone: UTC+5:45 (NST)
- Postal Code: 57300
- Area code: 027
- Language: Limbu, Nepali and English
- Website: ilammun.gov.np

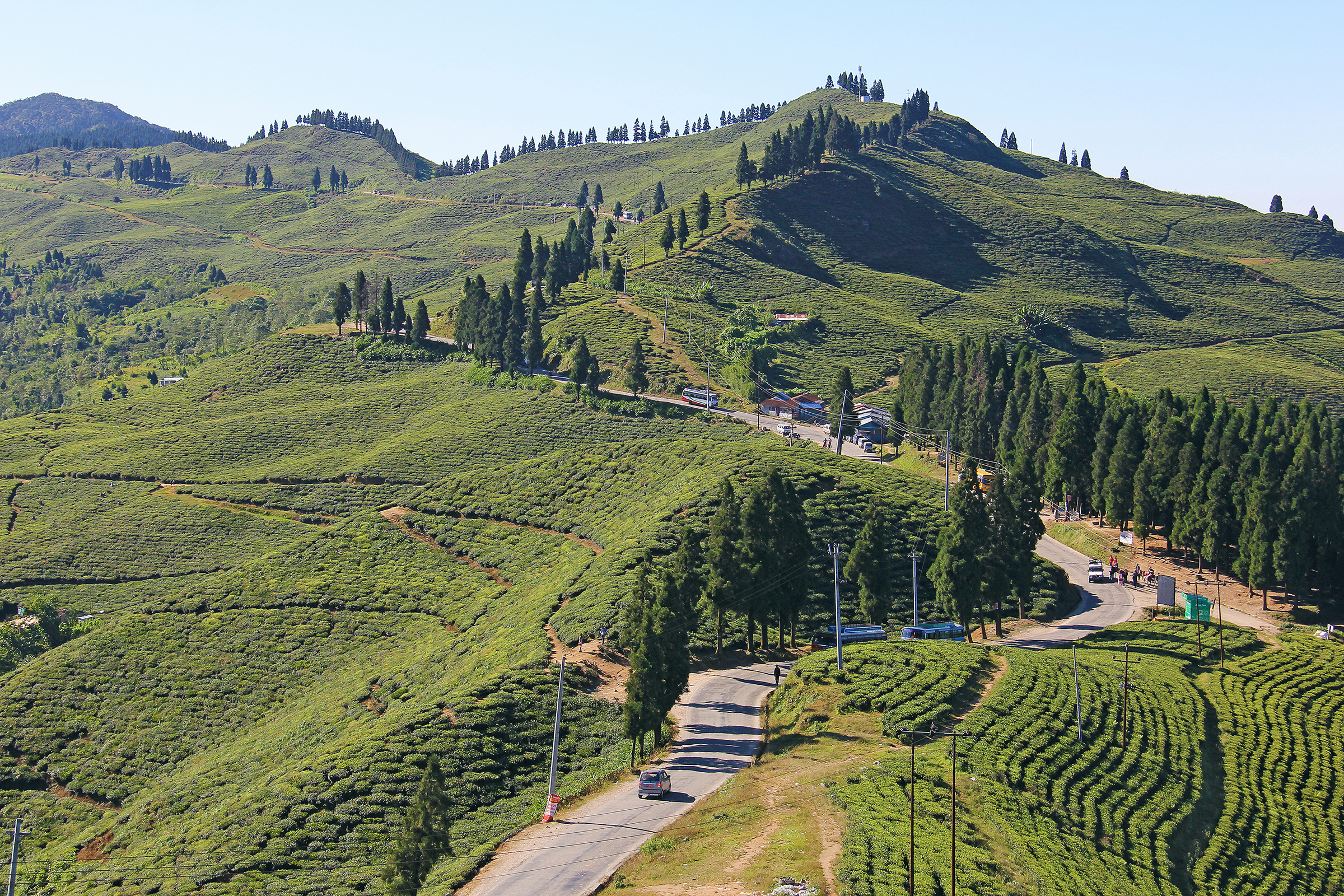
Kanyam, the most popular tourist destination that offers best tea gardens with wonderful landscape

Ilam (Nepali: इलाम) is one of four urban municipalities of Ilam District, which lies in the Mahabharata hilly range of Koshi Province, eastern Nepal. Ilam also acts as the headquarters of Ilam District. Being the largest producer region for Nepali tea, its tea farms are a major tourist attraction in Koshi Province. Ilam is also famous for its natural scenery and landscapes as well as its diverse agricultural economy which specializes in horticultural crop production.

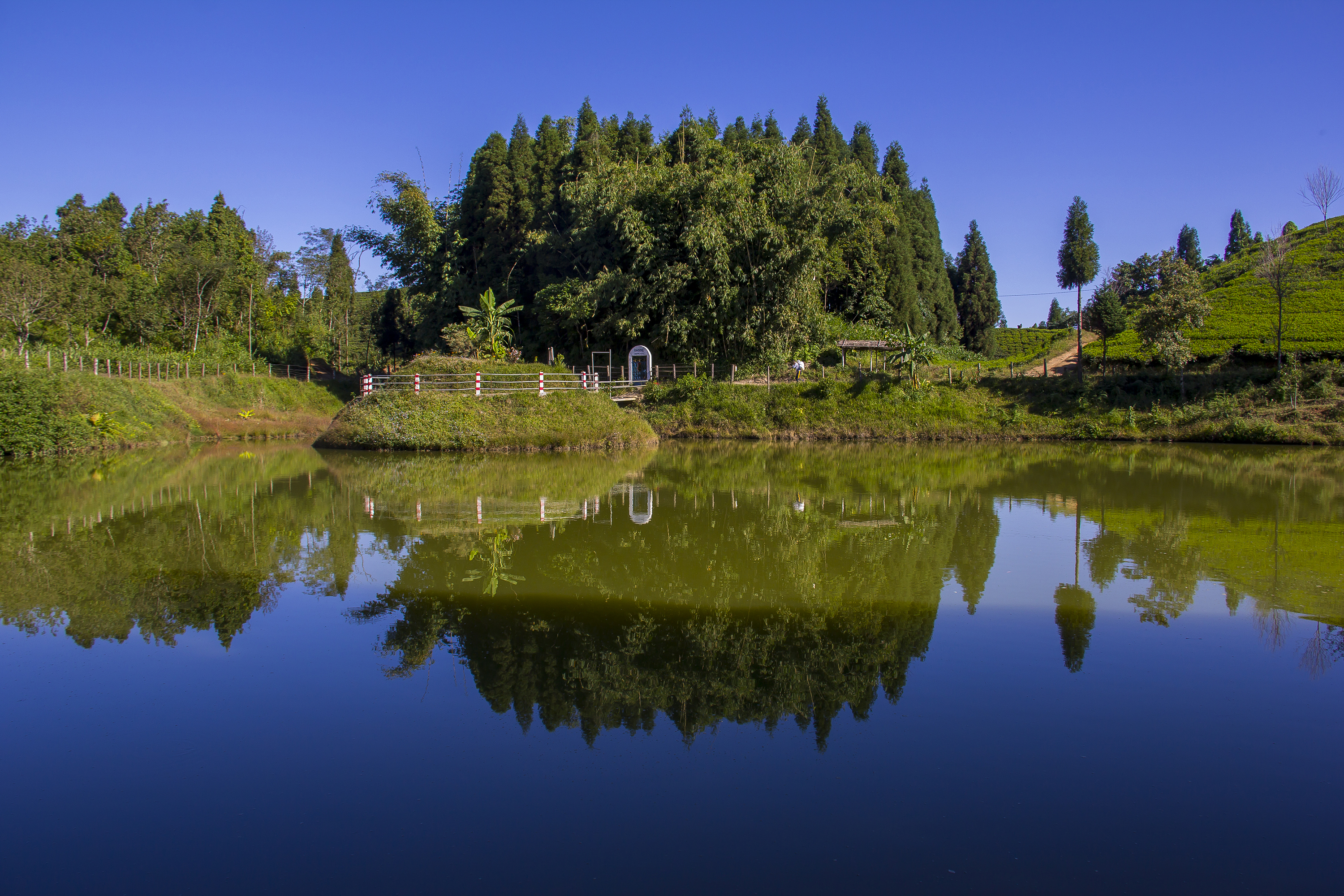
Antu Pond, reflecting the color of its surroundings

The total area of the municipality is 173.32 square kilometres (66.92 sq mi) and the total population is 48,536 as per the 2011 Nepal census. The municipality is divided into 12 wards. The 74 kilometer section of Mechi highway connects Ilam with the east–west highway and subsequently, with the provincial capital of Biratnagar.

== Etymology ==
The word ‘Ilam’ comprises two words-‘I’ and ‘Lam’. In Limbu language, the word ‘I’ means ‘winding’ and ‘lam’ denotes the way. The topography of this Ilam aptly depicts several winding paths crisscrossing.

== History ==
Ilam (Ilam Bazar; the core area) was established as the headquarters of Ilam Gauda in 1818 (1875 BS) and was declared as "Ilam Municipality" in 1958 but gazetted to "Nepal Rajpatra" only in 1962.

During the Panchayat System in Nepal (in 1960), the municipality used to be known as Ilam Nagar Panchayat.

In 1990, following the end of the Panchayat System, Ilam regained its official name of Ilam Municipality. The total area of the municipality was 30.91 square kilometres (11.93 sq mi) with division into nine wards, and the total population of the municipality as of 2007 was 34,648.

In 2015, with the amendment of the new Constitution of Nepal, Godak, Soyak, Barbote, part of Maipokhari Sumbek, Puwamajhuwa, part of Sangrumba, part of Siddhithumka and Sakhejung Village Development Committee were incorporated to it.

== Demography ==
According to 2011 Nepal census, the total population in Ilam was 48,563 and the main inhabitants of Ilam were Limbu, Rai, Yakkha, Lepcha, Newar, Magar, Tamang, Chettri, Bahun, Sunuwar and Gurung. The population of the municipality rose to 50,085 at the 2021 Nepal census. 99.7% of the residents were Nepali citizens and 86.7% were literate in 2021.

== Education ==
Ilam has many educational institutions. Ilam's major campus is Mahendra Ratna Multiple Campus, a first QAA certified constituent campus of Tribhuvan University. It has four faculties; Science, Humanities, Education, and Commerce. It provides education in undergraduate and post graduation subjects. From 2069 BS (2012 AD) under the affiliation from Tribhuvan University, the Institute of Agriculture and Animal Science, MRM Campus has started offering bachelor's degrees in Science in Horticulture. In addition to students from Ilam district, students from Jhapa, Morang, Sunsari, Panchthar, Taplejung, Dhankuta, Kathmandu, Janakpur, Pokhara, Chitwan, Banke, Gorkha, Lamjung, Rupandehi are here to study horticulture.

There are other institutes which provide higher education such as Adarhsa HSS, Modern Campus, Ilam Technical college, Heritage National Academy, Ilam Vidya Mandir. Green Valley Academy which provides secondary level education is regarded as one of the best schools in eastern Nepal due to its high-ranking SLC result.

== Economy ==
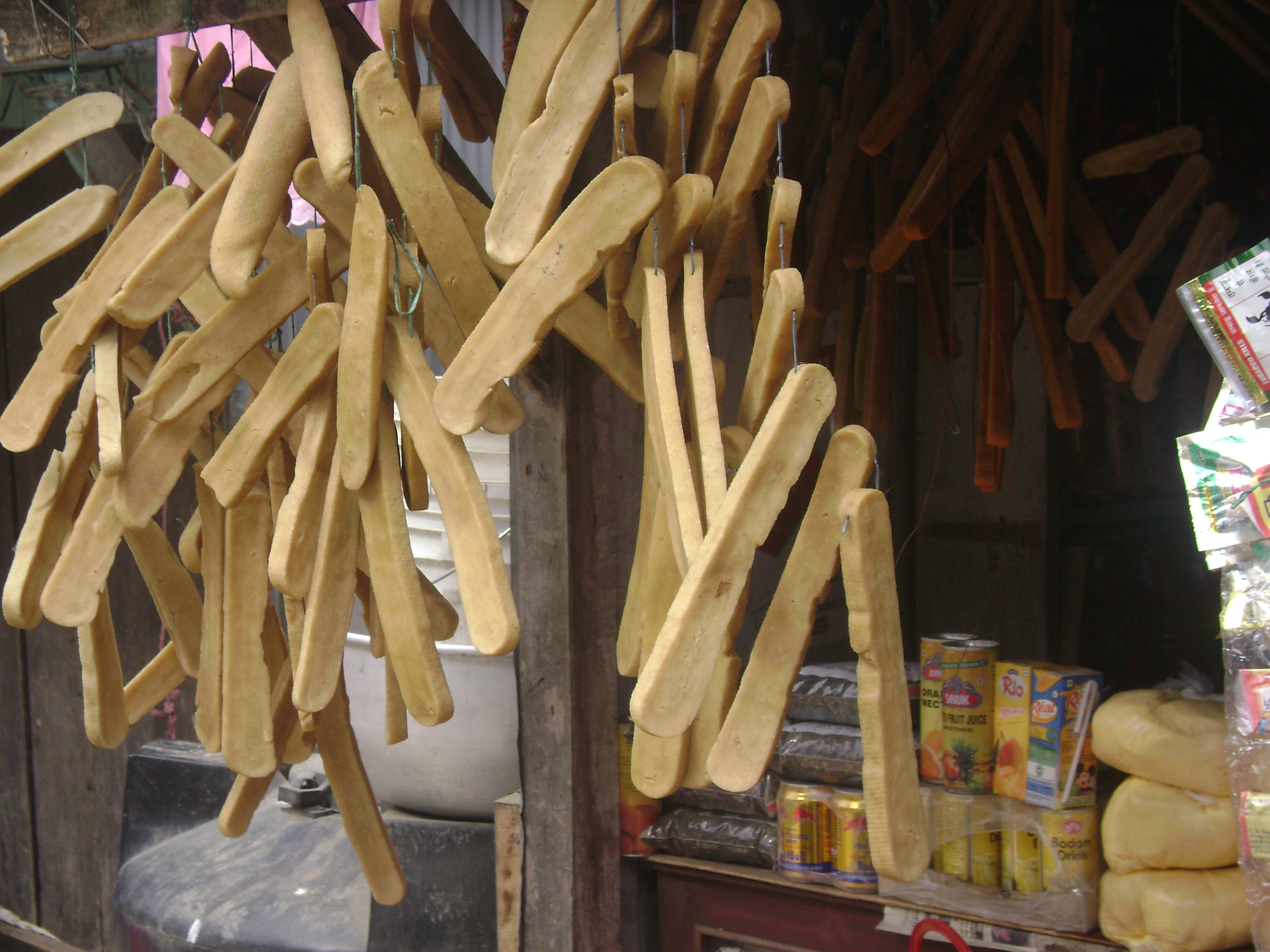
Chhurpi production in Ilam

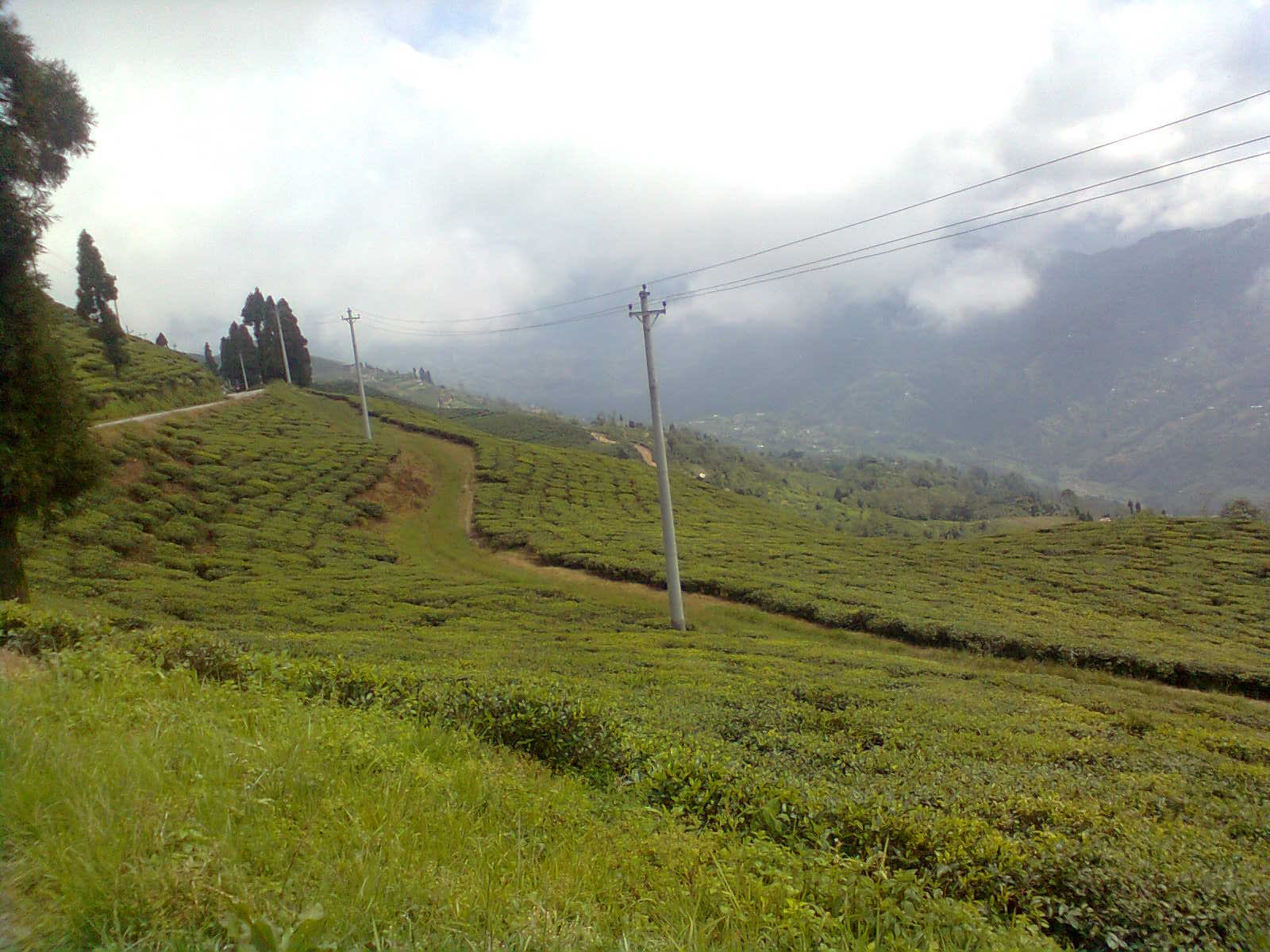
A tea garden

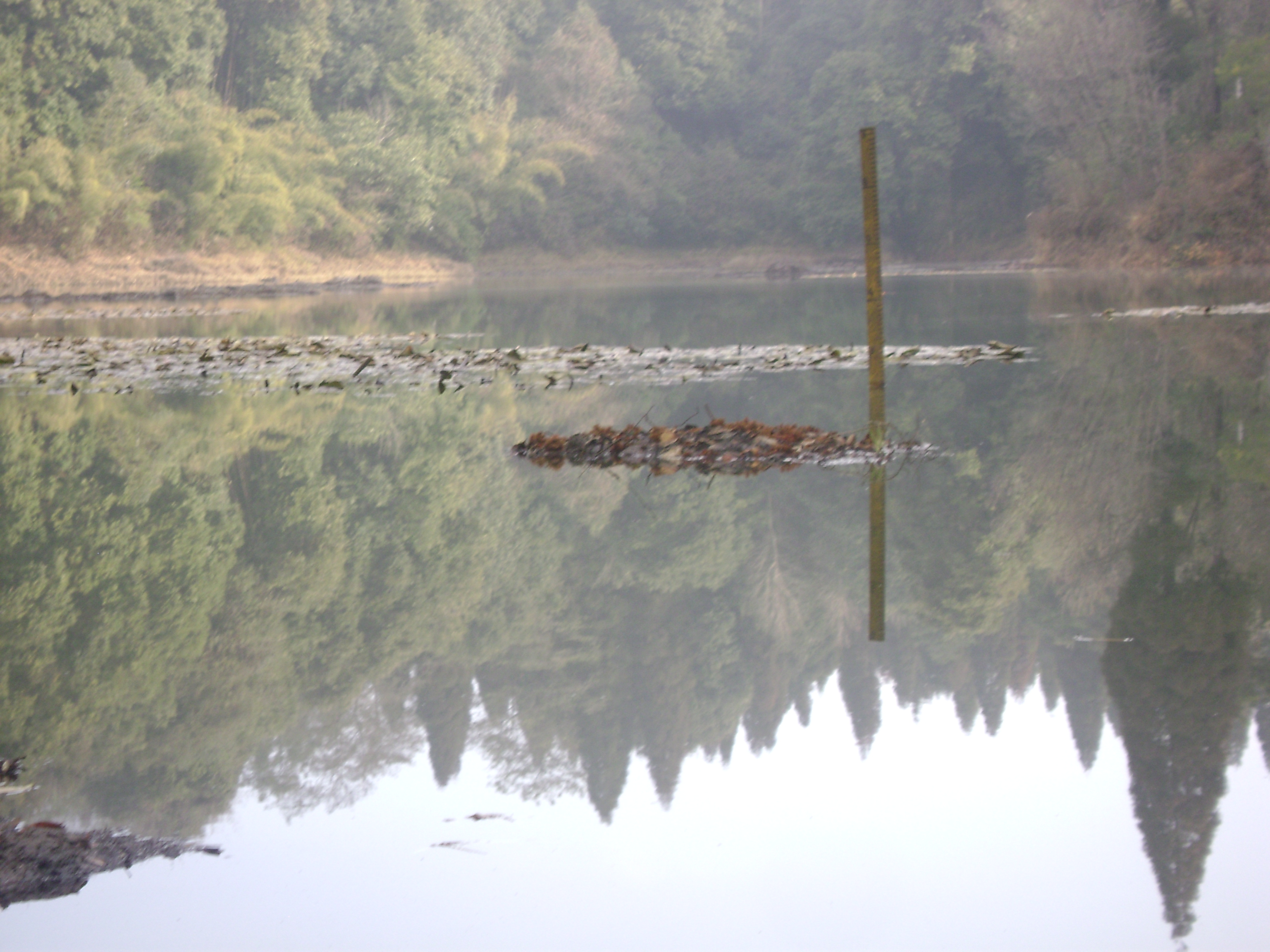
A religious spot

Tea production in Ilam (as Nepal tea) started as early as 1863, when the Chinese government offered then Prime Minister Jung Bahadur Rana tea saplings that were then planted in Ilam. In 1868, the Ilam tea factory was established, and tea plantations covered over 135 acres of land. In 2010, the tea factory was privatized, and is currently not under operation. However, tea production continues in Ilam in other forms. Many local people gets employment from this.

In 2010, the total tea production of Nepal is 16.23 million kilograms per annum; a majority of this amount is produced in Ilam.

New Hotels are being opened in Ilam for tourism. Ilam is known for its six "A"s: are Alu (Potato), Alan (Milk), Alainchi (Cardamom), Aduwa (Ginger), Amriso (Broom Grass), and Akabare khursani (Round Chillies). Alongside these tea, bamboo, flowers and silk are also produced in Ilam. Agricultural commodities helps to increase the Agricultural Gross Development Product. Beside these, the tourism sector also contributes in the economy of Ilam.

Ilam bazaar has got haat on Sundays and Thursdays every week.

== Climate ==
It is cold in Ilam during the winter, mild in summer and foggy in the monsoon season.

Climate data for Ilam (Ilam Tea Estate), elevation 1,300 m (4,300 ft), (1976–2005)
Month	Jan	Feb	Mar	Apr	May	Jun	Jul	Aug	Sep	Oct	Nov	Dec	Year
Mean daily maximum °C (°F)	16.1 (61.0)	17.9 (64.2)	22.0 (71.6)	24.9 (76.8)	25.2 (77.4)	25.5 (77.9)	24.8 (76.6)	25.2 (77.4)	24.7 (76.5)	23.6 (74.5)	21.2 (70.2)	18.0 (64.4)	22.4 (72.4)
Mean daily minimum °C (°F)	9.2 (48.6)	10.6 (51.1)	14.2 (57.6)	16.8 (62.2)	18.0 (64.4)	19.7 (67.5)	19.8 (67.6)	20.0 (68.0)	19.1 (66.4)	17.2 (63.0)	14.2 (57.6)	11.0 (51.8)	15.8 (60.5)
Average precipitation mm (inches)	13.6 (0.54)	16.3 (0.64)	24.9 (0.98)	61.6 (2.43)	132.5 (5.22)	295.8 (11.65)	466.7 (18.37)	366.2 (14.42)	229.9 (9.05)	73.4 (2.89)	12.6 (0.50)	10.4 (0.41)	1,709.3 (67.30)
Source: Agricultural Extension in South Asia

== Environmentalism in Ilam ==
Ilam municipality is also known for its innovations in environmentalism. In 2010, the municipality became the first one in Nepal to ban plastic bags from the market, this is the great success all over the Nepal. The district also set aside 38 ropanis (>19,000 square metres) of land in the same year for processing degradable waste. In addition, Ilam's network of microhydropower produces more reliable electricity than is available in the rest of Nepal.

== Transportation ==
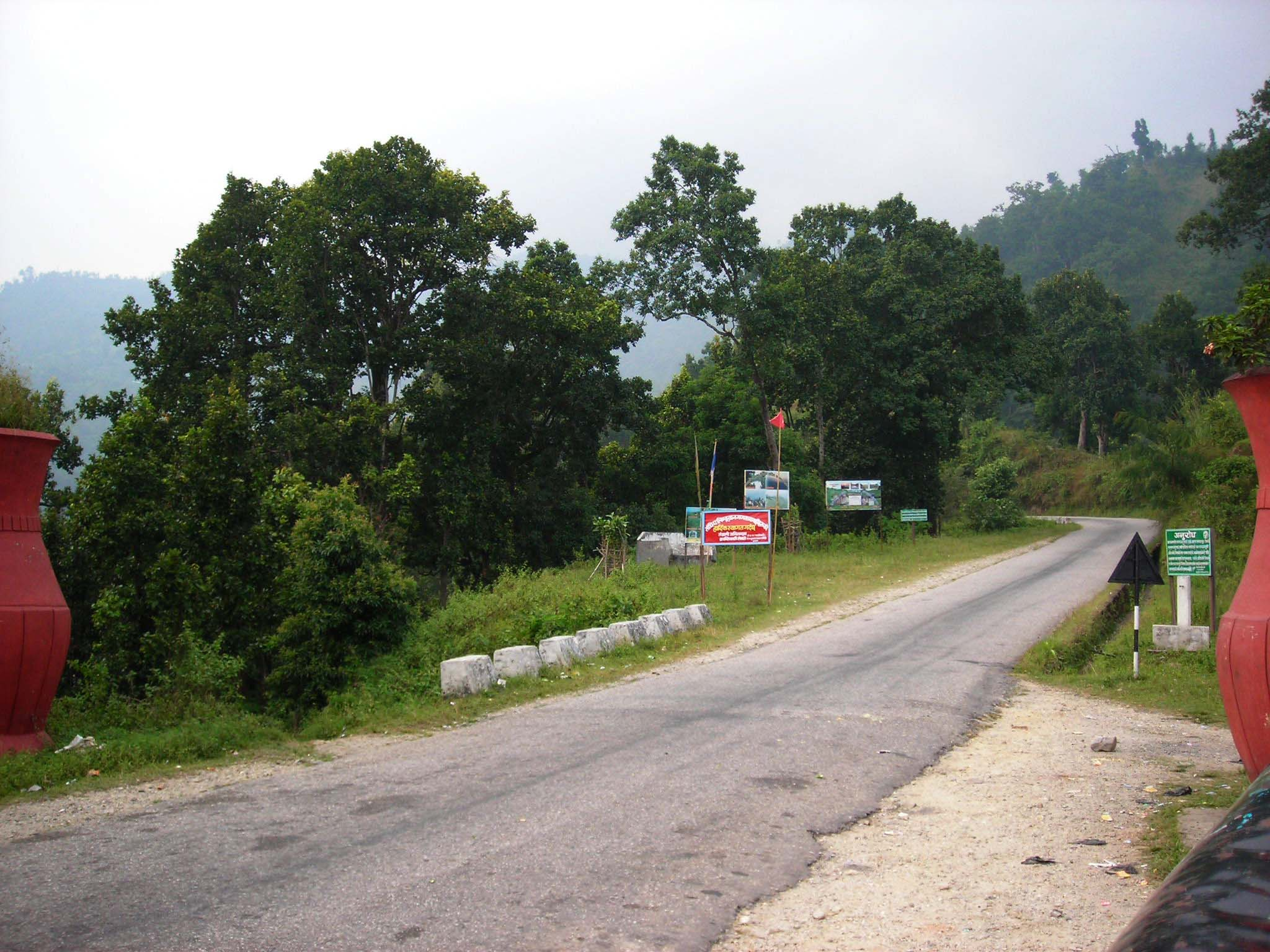
Gateway road to Ilam

Ilam Bazaar is located about 700 km (430 mi) east of Kathmandu. Regular buses are available from New Buspark, Koteshwor and Kalanki of Kathmandu which takes to Ilam after a bus ride of about 16 hours. An airport is under construction at Sukilumba Danda.

Daily Bus/Bolero is available from Ilam to Taplejung, Phidim, Birtamod, Chandragadhi, Kakarbhitta, Siliguri (West Bengal), Pashupatinagar, Damak, Itahari, Dharan and Biratnagar. A new buspark is being constructed at Sera. Besides these, Bus/Bolero also goes to all the VDCs of Ilam district.

== Media ==
Ilam has three FM radio station namely Ilam FM (93 Mz), Nepalbani FM (94.9 MHz), Chiyabari FM (88.2 MHz) which are Community radio station and Fikkal FM (90.6 MHz). They aim to promote local culture by various programs of infotainment. Chiyabari Daily, Ilam Express, Ilam Post and Sandakpur are daily newspaper published from Ilam. In addition to these, several weekly newspapers like Pawanbhumi and Ilam Awaj are published in Ilam.

== Notable people ==
- Sudip Gurung, Musician Aastha Band
- Hangyug Agyat, Poet and Writer.
- Krishna Bhusan Bal, Poet.
- Devika Bandana, Playback Singer.
- Shreedev Bhattarai, Actor and lyricist.
- Gyandil Das, Saint.
- Dinesh D.C., film director, film producer, film actor, TV actor, presenter, president of Cinema Circle Nepal and Chairperson of Film Development Board.
- Darshan Gurung, former footballer.
- Jhala Nath Khanal, 35th Prime Minister of Nepal.
- Subas Chandra Nemwang, Politician and Chairman of Constituent Assembly of Nepal.
- Phalgunanda, Cleric and scholar.
- Shamsher Rai, Politician.
- Taranath Sharma, Writer.
- Nawayug Shrestha, Footballer.
- Durga Subedi, Cricket Umpire.
