= Rong Rural Municipality =

Rong रोङ गाउँपालिका
- Rural Municipality
- Location in Province No. 1 Rong (Nepal)
- Coordinates: 26.80°N 88.05°E
- Province: Province No. 1
- District: Ilam
- Wards: 6
- Established: 10 March 2017
- Seat: Kolbung

Government
  - Type: Village Council
  - Chairperson: Mr. Mani Kumar Sangbo (NC)
  - Vice-chairperson: Mrs. Bishnu Maya Khawas (CPN-UML)

Area
  - Total: 155.06 km^{2} (59.87 sq mi)

Population (2011)
  - Total: 19,135
  - Density: 123.40/km^{2} (319.61/sq mi)
- Time zone: UTC+5:45 (Nepal Standard Time)
- Website: official website

Rong (Nepali: रोङ गाउँपालिका) is a rural municipality out of six rural municipalities located in Ilam District of Province No. 1 of Nepal. Six out of Ilam's 10 municipalities are rural and the remaining four urban.

According to Ministry of Federal Affairs and Local Development Rong has an area of 155.06 square kilometres (59.87 mi^{2}) and the total population of the municipality is 19135 as of Census of Nepal 2011.

Jirmale, Erautar, Kolbung and Shantipur which previously were all separate Village development committee merged to form this new local level body. Fulfilling the requirement of the new Constitution of Nepal 2015, Ministry of Federal Affairs and Local Development replaced all old VDCs and Municipalities into 753 new local level body (Municipality).

The rural municipality is divided into total 6 wards and the headquarter of this newly formed rural municipality is situated in Kolbung.
