= Maijogmai Rural Municipality =

Maijogmai माईजोगमाई गाउँपालिका
- Rural Municipality
- Location in Province No. 1 Maijogmai (Nepal)
- Coordinates: 26.95°N 88.04°E
- Province: Province No. 1
- District: Ilam
- Wards: 6
- Established: 10 March 2017
- Seat: Naya Bazar

Government
  - Type: Village Council
  - Chairperson: Mr. Kush Bahadur Thebe (CPN (UML))
  - Vice-chairperson: Mrs. Prabina Rai (Nepali Congress)

Area
  - Total: 172.41 km^{2} (66.57 sq mi)

Population (2011)
  - Total: 21,044
  - Density: 122.06/km^{2} (316.13/sq mi)
- Time zone: UTC+5:45 (Nepal Standard Time)
- Website: official website

Maijogmai (Nepali: माईजोगमाई गाउँपालिका) is one of the six rural municipalities (gaunpalika) located in Ilam District of Province No. 1 of Nepal. There are a total of 10 municipalities in Ilam, of which six are rural and the remaining four urban.

According to Ministry of Federal Affairs and Local Development Maijogmai has an area of 172.41 square kilometres (66.57 mi^{2}) and the total population of the municipality is 21044 as of Census of Nepal 2011. To form this new Rural Municipality Namsaling, Naya Bazar, Jogmai, Soyang and Pyang were merged, which previously were all separate Village development committee (local level administrative villages). Fulfilling the requirement of the new Constitution of Nepal 2015, Ministry of Federal Affairs and Local Development replaced all old VDCs and Municipalities into 753 new local level body (Municipality).

The rural municipality is divided into total 6 wards and the Naya Bazar is the Headquarter of this newly formed rural municipality.
