= Administration in Koshi Province =

Province of Nepal

Koshi Province with local level body

Koshi Province is the easternmost province of Nepal. It is surrounded by Tibet region of China to the north, the Indian states of Sikkim and West Bengal to the east, Bihar to the south, and Nepal's Bagmati and Madhesh provinces to the west.

Koshi occupies most of the area of what was previously Eastern Development Region. EDR has three zones and 16 districts. The districts were further subdivided into municipalities and village development committees.

== Administrative structure ==
Koshi Province is divided into 14 districts, and districts are subdivided into municipalities.

Nepal
Koshi Province
Districts
Metropolitan city	Sub-metropolitan city	Municipality	Rural municipality
Wards

== Districts ==
Koshi Province is divided into 14 districts.

#	Map	Name	Nepali	Headquarters	Population (2011) (2021)		Area (km^{2})	Website
1		Bhojpur District	भोजपुर जिल्ला	Bhojpur	182,459	158,991	1,507	
2		Dhankuta District	धनकुटा जिल्ला	Dhankuta	163,412	149,984	892	
3		Ilam District	इलाम जिल्ला	Ilam	290,254	280,565	1,703	
4		Jhapa District	झापा जिल्ला	Bhadrapur	812,650	994,090	1,606	
5		Khotang District	खोटाँग जिल्ला	Diktel	206,312	175,340	1,591	
6		Morang District	मोरंग जिल्ला	Biratnagar	965,370	1,147,186	1,855	
7		Okhaldhunga District	ओखलढुंगा जिल्ला	Siddhicharan	147,984	140,914	1,074	
8		Panchthar District	पांचथर जिल्ला	Phidim	191,817	174,419	1,241	
9		Sankhuwasabha District	संखुवासभा जिल्ला	Khandbari	158,742	159,046	3,480	
10		Solukhumbu District	सोलुखुम्बू जिल्ला	Salleri	105,886	104,768	3,312	
11		Sunsari District	सुनसरी जिल्ला	Inaruwa	763,497	934,461	1,257	
12		Taplejung District	ताप्लेजुंग जिल्ला	Taplejung	127,461	120,359	3,646	
13		Terhathum District	तेह्रथुम जिल्ला	Myanglung	113,111	89,125	679	
14		Udayapur District	उदयपुर जिल्ला	Gaighat	317,532	342,773	2,063	
		Koshi Province	कोशी प्रदेश	Biratnagar	4,546,487	4,972,021	25,906	

== Municipalities ==
There are two types of municipality:

- Urban municipality (nagarpalika)
  - Metropolitan city
  - Sub-metropolitan city
  - Municipality
- Rural municipality (gaunpalika)

=== Metropolitan cities ===
There is only one metropolitan city in Koshi Province.

Rank	Name	Nepali	District	Geocode	Population (2021)	Area	Website
1	Biratnagar	विराटनगर	Morang District	11214	244,750	77	

=== Sub-metropolitan cities ===
There are two sub-metropolitan cities in Koshi Province.

Rank	Name	Nepali	District	Geocode	Population (2021)	Area	Website
2	Itahari	ईटहरी	Sunsari District	11306	198,098	93.78	
3	Dharan	धरान	Sunsari District	11301	173,096	192.32	

=== Municipalities ===
There are 46 municipalities in Koshi Province.

Rank	Name	Nepali	District	Population (2021)	Area	Website
4	Mechinagar	मेचीनगर	Jhapa	131,520	192.85	
5	Sundar Haraicha	सुन्दरहरैंचा	Morang	121,305	110.16	
6	Birtamod	बिर्तामोड	Jhapa	117,355	78.24	
7	Damak	दमक	Jhapa	107,410	70.86	
8	Triyuga	त्रियुगा	Udayapur	104,375	547.43	
9	Baraha	बराह	Sunsari	91,891	222.09	
10	Arjundhara	अर्जुनधारा	Jhapa	84,429	109.86	
11	Belbari	बेलवारी	Morang	81,837	132.79	
12	Inaruwa	ईनरुवा	Sunsari	75,920	77.92	
13	Shivasatakshi Municipality	शिव सताक्षि	Jhapa	73,460	145.87	
14	Pathari Shanischare	पथरी शनिश्चरे	Morang	72,689	79.81	
15	Urlabari	उर्लावारी	Morang	71,562	74.62	
16	Bhadrapur	भद्रपुर	Jhapa	70,823	96.35	
17	Duhabi	दुहवी	Sunsari	67,051	73.67	
18	Ramdhuni	रामधुनी	Sunsari	63,378	91.69	
19	Ratuwamai	रतुवामाई	Morang	61,355	142.15	
20	Gauradaha	गौरादह	Jhapa	60,598	149.86	
21	Katari	कटारी	Udayapur	60,168	424.89	
22	Rangeli	रंगेली	Morang	57,814	111.78	
23	Sunawarshi	सुनवर्षी	Morang	56,169	106.4	
24	Suryodaya	सूर्योदय	Ilam	55,457	252.52	
25	Chaudandigadhi	चौदण्डीगढी	Udayapur	53,537	283.78	
26	Kankai	कंकाई	Jhapa	53,088	80.98	
27	Belaka	वेलका	Udayapur	51,458	344.73	
28	Ilam	इलाम	Ilam	50,455	173.32	
29	Phidim	फिदिम	Panchthar	48,713	192.5	
30	Rupakot Majhuwagadhi	रुपाकोट मजुवागढी	Khotang	43,295	246.51	
31	Letang	लेटाङ	Morang	38,675	219.23	
32	Dhankuta	धनकुटा	Dhankuta	36,156	111	
33	Khandbari	खादँवारी	Sankhuwasabha	36,102	122.78	
34	Deumai	देउमाई	Ilam	31,531	191.63	
35	Mai Municipality	माई	Ilam	30,988	246.11	
36	Shadanand	षडानंद	Bhojpur	29,777	101.5	
37	Phungling	फुङलिङ	Taplejung	28,786	125.57	
38	Siddhicharan	सिद्दिचरण	Okhaldhunga	27,977	167.88	
39	Halesi Tuwachung	हलेसी तुवाचुङ	Khotang	27,274	280.17	
40	Chainpur	चैनपुर	Sankhuwasabha	27,078	223.69	
41	Solu Dudhkunda	सोलु दुधकुण्ड	Solukhumbu	27,013	528.09	
42	Bhojpur	भोजपुर	Bhojpur	26,126	159.51	
43	Mahalaxmi Municipality	महालक्ष्मी नगरपालिका	Dhankuta	22,196	129	
44	Pakhribas	पाखरिबास	Dhankuta	19,256	144.29	
45	Myanglung	म्याङलुङ	Tehrathum	19,078	100.21	
46	Panchkhapan	पाँचखपन	Sankhuwasabha	16,391	148.03	
47	Dharmadevi	धर्मदेवी	Sankhuwasabha	16,300	132.82	
48	Laligurans	लालिगुराँस	Tehrathum	15,418	90.27	
49	Madi	मादी	Sankhuwasabha	13,428	110.1	

== Rural municipalities ==
There are 88 rural municipalities in Koshi Province:

No.	Name	Nepali	Districts	Area (km^{2})	Population (2021)	Density	Website
1	Kamal	कमल	Jhapa	104.57	53,710	514	
2	Buddha Shanti	बुद्धशान्ति	Jhapa	79.78	52,911	522	
3	Budi Ganga	बुढीगंगा	Morang	56.41	51,640	737	
4	Harinagara	हरिनगरा	Sunsari	52.29	49,501	781	
5	Bhokraha	भोक्राहा	Sunsari	63.37	49,371	639	
6	Koshi	कोशी	Sunsari	75.98	48,768	574	
7	Katahari	कटहरी	Morang	51.59	48,633	771	
8	Jahada	जहदा	Morang	62.38	47,836	670	
9	Dhanpalthan	धनपालथान	Morang	70.26	45,204	561	
10	Kanepokhari	कानेपोखरी	Morang	82.83	43,177	459	
11	Kachankawal	कचनकवल	Jhapa	109.45	42,386	361	
12	Gadhi	गढी	Sunsari	67.7	39,478	515	
13	Jhapa	झापा	Jhapa	94.12	39,372	368	
14	Dewangunj	देवानगन्ज	Sunsari	53.56	39,367	655	
15	Barhadashi	बाह्रदशी	Jhapa	88.44	37,916	381	
16:	Barju	बर्जु	Sunsari	69.43	36,533	449	
17	Gramthan	ग्रामथान	Morang	71.84	36,500	455	
18	Gaurigunj	गौरीगंज	Jhapa	101.35	36,058	326	
19	Kerabari	केरावारी	Morang	219.83	34,725	138	
20	Miklajung	मिक्लाजुङ	Morang	158.98	33,315	181	
21	Haldibari	हल्दीवारी	Jhapa	117.34	33,054	249	
22	Udayapurgadhi	उदयपुरगढी	Udayapur	209.51	28,929	147	
23	Chulachuli	चुलाचुली	Ilam	108.46	22,856	192	
24	Miklajung	मिक्लाजुङ	Morang	158.98	21,328	181	
25	Phalgunanda	फाल्गुनन्द	Panchthar	107.53	21,253	224	
26	Hilihang	हिलिहाङ	Panchthar	123.01	20,537	186	
27	Phalelung	फालेलुङ	Panchthar	207.14	20,531	106	
28	Rautamai	रौतामाई	Udayapur	204.08	20,418	115	
29	Phakphokthum	फाकफोकथुम	Ilam	108.79	20,004	199	
30	Manebhanjyang	मानेभञ्ज्याङ	Okhaldhunga	146.61	19,883	144	
31	Sangurigadhi	सागुरीगढी	Dhankuta	166.44	19,601	129	
32	Mai Jogmai	माईजोगमाई	Ilam	172.41	19,295	122	
33	Dudhkoshi	दुधकोशी	Solukhumbu	167.67	18,459	80	
34	Aathrai	आठराई	Terhathum	167.07	18,210	130	
35	Sunkoshi	सुनकोशी	Okhaldhunga	143.75	18,024	129	
36	Chaubise	चौविसे	Dhankuta	147.6	17,914	131	
37	Khalsa Chhintang Sahidbhumi	खाल्सा छिन्ताङ सहीदभूमि	Dhankuta	99.55	17,784	188	
38	Rong	रोङ	Ilam	155.06	17,555	123	
39	Khotehang	खोटेहाङ	Khotang	164.09	16,952	137	
40	Molung	मोलुङ	Okhaldhunga	112	16,944	142	
41	Mangsebung	माङसेबुङ	Ilam	142.41	16,897	130	
42	Yangwarak	याङवरक	Panchthar	208.63	16,828	88	
43	Diprung	दिप्रुङ	Khotang	136.59	16,549	148	
44	Champadevi	चम्पादेवी	Okhaldhunga	126.91	16,528	147	
45	Chhathar Jorpati	छथर जोरपाटी	Dhankuta	102.83	16,477	178	
46	Hatuwagadhi	हतुवागढी	Bhojpur	142.61	16,302	143	
47	Khiji Demba	खिजिदेम्बा	Okhaldhunga	179.77	15,867	84	
48	Ramprasad Rai	रामप्रसाद राई	Bhojpur	158.83	15,632	119	
49	Tyamke Maiyunm	ट्याम्केमैयुम	Bhojpur	173.41	15,491	103	
50	Sandakpur	सन्दकपुर	Ilam	156.01	15,460	103	
51	Aamchok	आमचोक	Bhojpur	184.89	15,237	101	
52	Phedap	फेदाप	Terhathum	110.83	15,236	160	
53	Arun	अरुण	Bhojpur	154.76	14,853	114	
54	Chhathar	छथर	Terhathum	133.93	14,245	125	
55	Sirijangha	सिरीजङ्घा	Taplejung	481.09	14,186	33	
56	Chisankhugadhi	चिसंखुगढी	Okhaldhunga	126.91	13,761	120	
57	Aiselukharka	ऐसेलुखर्क	Khotang	125.93	13,581	128	
58	Makalu	मकालु	Sankhuwasabha	519.45	13,492	25	
59	Tapli	ताप्ली	Udayapur	119.11	13,377	122	
60	Kepilasgadhi	केपिलासगढी	Khotang	191.55	13,339	80	
61	Kummayak	कुम्मायक	Panchthar	129.3	13,020	125	
62	Dudhkoshi	दुधकोशी	Solukhumbu	167.67	12,746	80	
63	Aathrai Triveni	आठराई त्रिवेणी	Taplejung	88.83	12,288	155	
64	Salpasilichho	साल्पासिलिछो	Bhojpur	193.33	12,229	68	
65	Pauwadungma	पौवादुङमा	Bhojpur	118.86	12,170		
66	Jantedhunga	जन्तेढुंगा	Khotang	128.68	12,066	120	
67	Meringden	मेरिङदेन	Taplejung	210.33	12,040	60	
68	Maha Kulung	महाकुलुङ	Solukhumbu	648.05	11,971	18	
69	Likhu	लिखु	Okhaldhunga	88.03	11,930	160	
70	Phaktanglung	फक्ताङलुङ	Taplejung	1,858.51	11,925	6	
71	Pathibhara Yangwarak	पाथीभरा याङवरक	Taplejung	93.76	11,797	145	
72	Barahpokhari	बराहपोखरी	Khotang	141.57	11,461	101	
73	Rawabesi	लामीडाँडा	Khotang	97.44	11,218	137	
74	Tumbewa	तुम्बेवा	Panchthar	117.34	11,063	114	
75	Sidingwa	सिदिङ्वा	Taplejung	206	10,981	59	
76	Necha Salyan	नेचासल्यान	Solukhumbu	94.49	10,828	171	
77	Silichong	सिलीचोङ	Sankhuwasabha	293.26	10,432	42	
78	Maiwa Khola	मैवाखोला	Taplejung	138	10,365	80	
79	Sabhapokhari	सभापोखरी	Sankhuwasabha	222.08	10,005	47	
80	Limchungbung	सुनकोशी	Udayapur	106.8	9,789	112	
81	Sakela	साकेला	Khotang	79.99	9,605	145	
82	Sotang	सोताङ	Solukhumbu	103	9,261	93	
83	Khumbu Pasang Lhamu	खुम्बु पासाङल्हमु	Solukhumbu	1,539.11	9,226	6	
84	Mikwa Khola	मिक्वाखोला	Taplejung	442.96	7,991	21	
85	Chichila	चिचिला	Sankhuwasabha	88.63	6,720	80	
86	Menchayayem	मेन्छयायेम	Terhathum	70.09	6,698	115	
87	Bhot Khola	भोटखोला	Sankhuwasabha	639.01	6,509	10	
88	Likhu Pike	लिखुपिके	Solukhumbu	124.38	5,264	44	

== Judiciary ==
=== High court ===
Biratnagar High Court (Nepali: बिराटनगर उच्च अदालत) is the high court of Koshi Province. The high court established according to the new constitution of Nepal. Article 139 of the constitution says "there shall be a High Court in each state". According to article 300 (3): "The High Courts set forth in Article 139 shall be established no later than one year after the date of commencement of this Constitution. The Appellate Courts existing at the time of commencement of this Constitution shall be dissolved after the establishment of such courts". The government of Nepal transformed the existing appellate court in Biratnagar on 14 September 2016. As per the government decision, there will be extended benches in Illam, Dhankuta and Okhaldhunga under the high court in Biratnagar.

Tej Bahadur KC is the current chief judge of Biratnagar High Court.

=== District court ===
Clause 148, 149, 150 and 151 of the Constitution of Nepal, 2015 defines District Courts, appointment, qualification, terms and remuneration of chief justices.

There are 14 district courts in Koshi Province. Each has one district court.

Districts	Official website
Bhojpur	http://supremecourt.gov.np/court/bhojpurdc
Dhankuta	http://supremecourt.gov.np/court/dhankutadc
Ilam	http://supremecourt.gov.np/court/ilamdc
Jhapa	http://supremecourt.gov.np/court/jhapadc
Khotang	http://supremecourt.gov.np/court/khotangdc
Morang	http://supremecourt.gov.np/court/morangdc
Okhaldhunga	http://supremecourt.gov.np/court/okhaldhungadc
Panchthar	http://supremecourt.gov.np/court/panchthardc
Sankhuwasabha	http://supremecourt.gov.np/court/sankhuwasabhadc
Solukhumbu	http://supremecourt.gov.np/court/solukhumbudc
Sunsari	http://supremecourt.gov.np/court/sunsaridc
Taplejung	http://supremecourt.gov.np/court/taplejungdc
Terhathum	http://supremecourt.gov.np/court/terhathumdc
Udayapur	http://supremecourt.gov.np/court/udayapurdc

== Legislature ==
Pradesh Sabha (provincial assembly) of Koshi Province is the unicameral legislative assembly.

=== Constituency ===
Koshi Province has 56 constituencies (provincial seats) under the FPtP (first-past-the-post) system.

#	Districts	No. of constituencies	Constituencies' names	Population	Ref
1	Taplejung District	2	List: Taplejung 1 (A); Taplejung 1 (B)	126448	
2	Panchthar District	2	List: Panchthar 1 (A); Panchthar 1 (B)	190591	
3	Ilam District	4	List: Ilam 1 (A); Ilam 1 (B); Ilam 2 (A); Ilam 2 (B)	287916	
4	Jhapa District	10	List: Jhapa 1 (A); Jhapa 1 (B); Jhapa 2 (A); Jhapa 2 (B); Jhapa 3 (A); Jhapa 3 (B); Jhapa 4 (A); Jhapa 4 (B); Jhapa 5 (A); Jhapa 5 (B)	287916	
5	Morang District	12	List: Morang 1 (A); Morang 1 (B); Morang 2 (A); Morang 2 (B); Morang 3 (A); Morang 3 (B); Morang 4 (A); Morang 4 (B); Morang 5 (A); Morang 5 (B); Morang 6 (A); Morang 6 (B)	965370	
6	Sunsari District	8	List: Sunsari 1 (A); Sunsari 1 (B); Sunsari 2 (A); Sunsari 2 (B); Sunsari 3 (A); Sunsari 3 (B); Sunsari 4 (A); Sunsari 4 (B)	753328	
7	Dhankuta District	2	List: Dhankuta 1 (A); Dhankuta 1 (B)	161399	
8	Sankhuwasabha District	2	List: Sankhuwasabha 1 (A); Sankhuwasabha 1 (B)	158222	
9	Bhojpur District	2	List: Bhojpur 1 (A); Bhojpur 1 (B)	180889	
10	Tehrathum District	2	List: Tehrathum 1 (A); Tehrathum 1 (B)	100869	
11	Okhaldhunga District	2	List: Okhaldhunga 1 (A); Okhaldhunga 1 (B)	146832	
12	Khotang District	2	List: Khotang 1 (A); Khotang 1 (B)	205225	
13	Solukhumbu District	2	List: Solukhumbu 1 (A); Solukhumbu 1 (B)	105119	
14	Udayapur District	4	List: Udayapur 1 (A); Udayapur 1 (B); Udayapur 2 (A); Udayapur 2 (B)	315429	

=== District Coordination Committee ===
The District Coordination Committee is the legislative body at district level. The Head of a district development committee is elected by the district assembly. The DCC acts as an executive to the district Assembly. The DCC coordinates with the Provincial Assembly to establish coordination between the Provincial Assembly and rural municipalities and municipalities and to settle disputes, if any, of political nature. It also maintains coordination between the provincial and Federal government and among the local bodies in the district. It also monitors development within the district.

== Executive ==
The head of the provincial government is the chief minister, who is the parliamentary party leader of the party with the majority or the highest number of seats in the assembly. The assembly can force the resignation of the chief minister with a vote of no confidence.

Executive	Name	Website
Governor	Parshuram Khapung	http://oph.p1.gov.np/
Chief Minister	Kedar Karki	https://ocmcm.p1.gov.np/

=== District administration ===
The district administration office (DAO) is a general administration of government in each district. The Ministry of Home Affairs appoints a chief district officer (CDO) in each DAO.

#	District administration office	CDO	Official website
1	Taplejung DAO	Mohan Bahadur GC	http://daotaplejung.moha.gov.np/
2	Panchthar DAO	Prince Singh	http://daopanchthar.moha.gov.np/
3	Ilam DAO	Tulasi Ram Sedai	http://daoilam.moha.gov.np/
4	Jhapa DAO	Shrawan Kumar Timalsina	http://daojhapa.moha.gov.np/
5	Morang DAO	Shri Ram Prasad Acharya	http://daomorang.moha.gov.np/
6	Sunsari DAO	Humkala Pandey	http://daosunsari.moha.gov.np/
7	Dhankuta DAO	Prem Prakash Upreti	http://daodhankuta.moha.gov.np/
8	Terhathum DAO	Bishwaraj Neupane	https://daoterathum.moha.gov.np/
9	Sankhuwasabha DAO	Shivaraj Joshi	http://daosankhuwasabha.moha.gov.np/
10	Bhojpur DAO	Phanindra Dahal	http://daobhojpur.moha.gov.np/
11	Solukhumbu DAO	Shri Sunil Khanal	http://daosolu.moha.gov.np/
12	Okhaldhunga DAO	Janakraj Panta	http://daookhaldhunga.moha.gov.np/
13	Khotang DAO	Ekdeva Adhikari	http://daokhotang.moha.gov.np/
14	Udayapur DAO	Bishnu Kumar Karki	http://daoudayapur.moha.gov.np/

== See also ==
- List of cities in Nepal
