= Mai Municipality =

Mai Municipality माई नगरपालिका
- Municipality
- Location in Province No. 1 Mai Municipality (Nepal)
- Coordinates: 26.77°N 87.90°E
- Country: Nepal
- Province: Province No. 1
- District: Ilam District
- Total Wards: 10

Government
  - Mayor: Khamba Singh Limbu (NCP)
  - Deputy Mayor: Hima Bhandari(NCP)

Area of Municipality
  - Total: 264 km^{2} (102 sq mi)
  - Rank: 9th (Province No. 1)

Population (2011)
  - Total: 33,210
- Time zone: UTC+5:45 (NST)
- Website: www.maimun.gov.np

Mai (Nepali: माई) is one of the four municipalities of Ilam District of Province No. 1 of Nepal. It was formed in May 2017 with merging some VDC. The Mahamai, Danabari and Chisapani VDCs were merged. The municipality is divided into ten wards which is surrounded by Deumai Municipality and Ilam Municipality from north, Suryodaya Municipality from north-east, Jhapa District from south-east and Mangsebung and Chulachuli Rural Municipality from west.

It has an area of 264 square kilometres (102 mi^{2}). According to 2011 Census of Nepal, it had population of 33,210 people, in which female comprises 17,111.

After winning the local election of 2022, Khamba Singh Limbu was elected as a mayor and Hima Bhandari elected as a deputy mayor in Mai Municipality.
