= Phakphok =

Phakphok फाकफोक
- Village
- Location in Koshi Phakphok (Nepal)
- Coordinates: 26.99°N 87.76°E
- Country: Nepal
- Province: Koshi Province
- District: Ilam District
- Rural Municipality: Phakphokthum Rural Municipality

Government
  - Type: Ward (division)

Population (1991)
  - Total: 4,233
- Time zone: UTC+5:45 (Nepal Time)

Phakphok is a Village in Phakphokthum Rural Municipality of Ilam District in the Koshi Province of eastern Nepal. At the time of the 1991 Nepal census it had a population of 4,233 persons living in 734 individual households.

Phakphok borders with Panchthar district at north west whereas Ektappa borders at the east. Other settlement like Chamaita and Amchok are also linked with Phakphok at north east and south west respectively.

== Socio-Economic ==
Agriculture has been major occupation of the people living in Phakphok- which is also the major income source of most of the families. Most of the major cash crops like Nepali tea and Cardamom (Nepali-अलैंची) are grown at the northern parts of VDC whereas crops like ginger is grown on southern parts. Most of the cash crops are exported to India, Bangladesh and other countries. Other crops like maize, rice, barley, potato etc. are also grown in the region. Phakphok VDC is connected with Mechi Highway at Ranke bazar located at the border between Panchthar and Ilam district. Roads from Mechi Highway to Kolbhote are graveled which runs smoothly during September to May. During June to August, sometimes roads are paralyzed by landslid caused by monsoon. Regular public transport (most common- taxi or van) can be found connecting Kolbhote and district capital ilam commonly called as ilam bazar. All most all the phakphok VDC is electrified mainly from hydro electricity generated from the local river. Major electricity is provided by Mai Hydropower Station, Puwa Khola Hydropower Station and other small hydro power plants. Phakphok micro hydropower generated from Phakphok river provides most of the electricity at the southern parts of the VDC.

== Geography and Climate ==
Phakphok is a hilly area located on the base of Mahabharat range with the average altitude of 2000-3000 meter. Phakphok khola is the major river of the VDC on the western border and another being Tyawa khola (River) on the eastern border. Northern parts of the VDC (ward-3,4,5) experiences quite heavy rainfall during monsoon season and are relatively cold with annual temperature ( min-8 to max- 23 °C). Southern part (ward-9) is relatively warm place where major rice cultivation is done. Mixed vegetation are found in the areas: for example trees like pine, Aluus ( Nepali -उत्तिश), schima (Nepali-चिलाउने), Castanopsis tribuloides (Nepali-कटुस) are commonly found in the areas.

== People ==
Racially mixed people lived in the areas both who has been migrated from other parts of the country and the local indigenous people. People from different races like Limbu, Magar Chhettri, Rai, Tamang etc. live together in a mixed society.
