= Larumba =

- Holy place
- Location within Nepal
- Coordinates: 26.81°N 87.75°E
- Country: Nepal
- Zone: Mechi Zone
- District: Ilam
- Area: Mangsebung
- Time zone: UTC+5:45 (Nepal Time)
- Nearest city: Damak

Larumba of Ilam District in Nepal is a major religious site for the followers of the Kirat religion. It is situated at Mangsebung Rural Municipality, and is known for discarding the culture of animal sacrifice. Alcohol, cigarettes, tobacco, and other consumable hazards are prohibited inside the temple premises.

== History ==
Every year during November/December, a huge festival is organized to mark the birth of Kirat Guru Atmananda Lingden. Devotees attend this ceremony wearing white dresses. It is situated 24 kilometres (15 mi) north from Damak in Jhapa and 50 kilometres (31 mi) south-west from Ilam. Larumba has seen remarkable growth as a town for religious tourism.
