= Mangsebung Rural Municipality =

Mangsebung माङसेबुङ गाउँपालिका
- Rural Municipality
- Location in Province No. 1 Mangsebung (Nepal)
- Coordinates: 26.87°N 87.75°E
- Province: Province No. 1
- District: Ilam
- Wards: 6
- Established: 10 March 2017

Government
  - Type: Village Council
  - Chairperson: Mr. Hemanta Rai (CPN-UML)
  - Vice-chairperson: Mr.Binod Kumar Nembang (PSPN)

Area
  - Total: 142.41 km^{2} (54.98 sq mi)

Population (2011)
  - Total: 18,503
  - Density: 129.93/km^{2} (336.51/sq mi)
- Time zone: UTC+5:45 (Nepal Standard Time)
- Headquarter: Ibhang
- Website: official website

Mangsebung (Nepali: माङसेबुङ गाउँपालिका) is one of the six rural municipalities (gaunpalika) located in Ilam District of Province No. 1 of Nepal. Out of Ilam's 10 municipalities, four are urban and six rural.

According to Ministry of Federal Affairs and Local Development Mangsebung has an area of 142.41 square kilometres (54.98 mi^{2}) and the total population of the municipality is 18503 as of Census of Nepal 2011.

Banjho, Ibhang, and Gajurmukhi which previously were all separate Village development committee merged to form this new local level body. Fulfilling the requirement of the new Constitution of Nepal 2015, Ministry of Federal Affairs and Local Development replaced all old VDCs and Municipalities into 753 new local level body (Municipality).

The rural municipality is divided into total 6 wards and the headquarter of this newly formed rural municipality is situated in Ibhang.
