= Dhuseni =

Dhuseni may refer to:

- Dhuseni, Gandaki, Nepal
- Dhuseni, Mechi, Nepal
