= Sangrumba =

Sangrumba साङरुम्बा is a town and Village Development Committee in Ilam District in the Province No. 1 of eastern Nepal. At the time of the 1991 Nepal census it had a population of 4,607 persons living in 839 individual households. According to the VDC report of 2068 BS, the total population was 6,288 and the total number of households was 1,227, an average of 5.12 members per household.

Sangrumba village development committee lies almost in the middle part of the Ilam district . The boundary touches Ilam, SantiDanda, Mangalbare, Jitpur, Sidhithumka and Soyak VDC. Its boundaries are from 26° 52′ 40″ to 26° 56′ 18″ north, and from 87° 50′ 44″ to 87° 54′ 44″ east. The village covers approximately 19 square km. south of Ilam town and its headquarters. Due to the change in height from 500 to 1760 meters above sea level, its temperature ranges from 2 to 36 degrees Celsius.

The name Sangrumba derives from the Limbu language. "Sanwa" means buffalo and "rumba" means drowned. It has one higher secondary school (est. 2008 BS/1951 AD) located in Ward No. 3 and three lower secondary schools in Wards Nos. 2, 4 and 9. There are also primary schools in each ward, as well as four child development centres.
