= Chulachuli Rural Municipality =

Chalachuli चुलाचुली गाउँपालिका
- Rural Municipality
- Location in Koshi Province Chalachuli (Nepal)
- Coordinates: 26.71°N 87.76°E
- Province: Koshi Province
- District: Ilam
- Wards: 6
- Established: 10 March 2017
- Seat: Ward No. 6

Government
  - Type: Village Council
  - Chairperson: Mr. Rajendra kerung ( Nepali congress )
  - Vice-chairperson: Mrs. Dilu kumari limbu ( yonghang )(NCP)

Area
  - Total: 108.46 km^{2} (41.88 sq mi)

Population (2011)
  - Total: 20,820
  - Density: 192.0/km^{2} (497.2/sq mi)
- Time zone: UTC+5:45 (Nepal Standard Time)
- Website: official website

Chulachuli (Nepali: चुलाचुली गाउँपालिका) is one of the six rural municipalities (gaunpalika) located in Ilam District of Koshi Province of Nepal. Out of Ilam's 10 municipalities, four are urban and six rural.

According to Ministry of Federal Affairs and Local Development Chalachuli has an area of 108.46 square kilometres (41.88 mi^{2}) and the total population of the municipality is 20820 as of Census of Nepal 2011. Chalachuli was a Village development committee which turned into rural municipality when fulfilling the requirement of the new Constitution of Nepal 2015, Ministry of Federal Affairs and Local Development replaced all old VDCs and Municipalities into 753 new local level body (Municipality). To fulfil the requirements of a rural municipality an adjoining village development committee named Sakphara was added to it.

The rural municipality is divided into total 6 wards and the headquarter of this newly formed rural municipality is situated in ward no. 6

== Demographics ==
At the time of the 2011 Nepal census, Chulachuli Rural Municipality had a population of 21,413. Of these, 44.5% spoke Nepali, 20.3% Limbu, 10.8% Bantawa, 7.8% Rai, 3.9% Tamang, 2.1% Chamling, 1.9% Kulung, 1.3% Magar, 0.9% Yakkha, 0.8% Sampang, 0.6% Thulung, 0.5% Newar, 0.3% Dhimal, 0.3% Dumi, 0.2% Gurung, 0.2% Khaling, 0.2% Koi, 0.2% Sunwar, 0.1% Bhujel, 0.1% Dungmali, 0.1% Maithili, 0.1% Majhi, 0.1% Nachhiring, 0.1% Sherpa and 2.5% other languages as their first language.

In terms of ethnicity/caste, 26.4% were Limbu, 25.1% Rai, 13.3% Hill Brahmin, 8.9% Chhetri, 5.1% Kami, 4.8% Tamang, 3.9% Newar, 2.1% Magar, 1.7% Damai/Dholi, 1.5% Kumal, 1.0% Sanyasi/Dasnami, 0.9% Yakkha, 0.4% Bantawa, 0.4% Dhimal, 0.3% Gharti/Bhujel, 0.3% Gurung, 0.3% Samgpang, 0.3% Sunuwar, 0.2% Badi, 0.2% Majhi, 0.1% Chamling, 0.1% Musahar, 0.1% Sarki, 0.1% Sherpa and 0.5% others.

In terms of religion, 48.0% were Kirati, 39.5% Hindu, 5.6% Buddhist, 3.5% Christian, 0.3% Prakriti and 3.0% others.

In terms of literacy, 74.1% could read and write, 2.2% could only read and 23.7% could neither read nor write.

== Former VDC ==
Formally Chulachuli was a Village Development Committee in Ilam District in the Province No. 1 of eastern Nepal. At the time of the 1991 Nepal census it had a population of 18,176.
