= Yubraj Nayaghare =

Nepalese writer

- युवराज नयाँघरे
- Born: 5 October 1969 (age 56); Ilam District
- Occupation: Writer
- Notable work: Ek Haatko Taali
- Awards: Madan Puraskar

Yubraj Nayaghare (Nepali: युवराज नयाँघरे) is writer, litterateur and winner of Madan Puraskar of Nepal.

== Books ==
- Anaam Pahadma PhanPhani
- Ghamko Chumban (2012)
- Ek Haatko Taali (2009) - won the Madan Puraskar award
- Aunla Aunlama Australia
- Yakji
- Harabara
- Tanakkha
- Swaha
- Dollar ko Diary
- Mukhundoko Man
- Whitehouseko Ghaampani
- Kathmandaulai Korra
- shey phoksundoko sundarta
