= Lakshmipur, Ilam =

Coordinates: 26°51′N 87°59′E

Laxmipur लक्ष्मीपुर Siryodaya-13, Ilam
- Village Development Committee
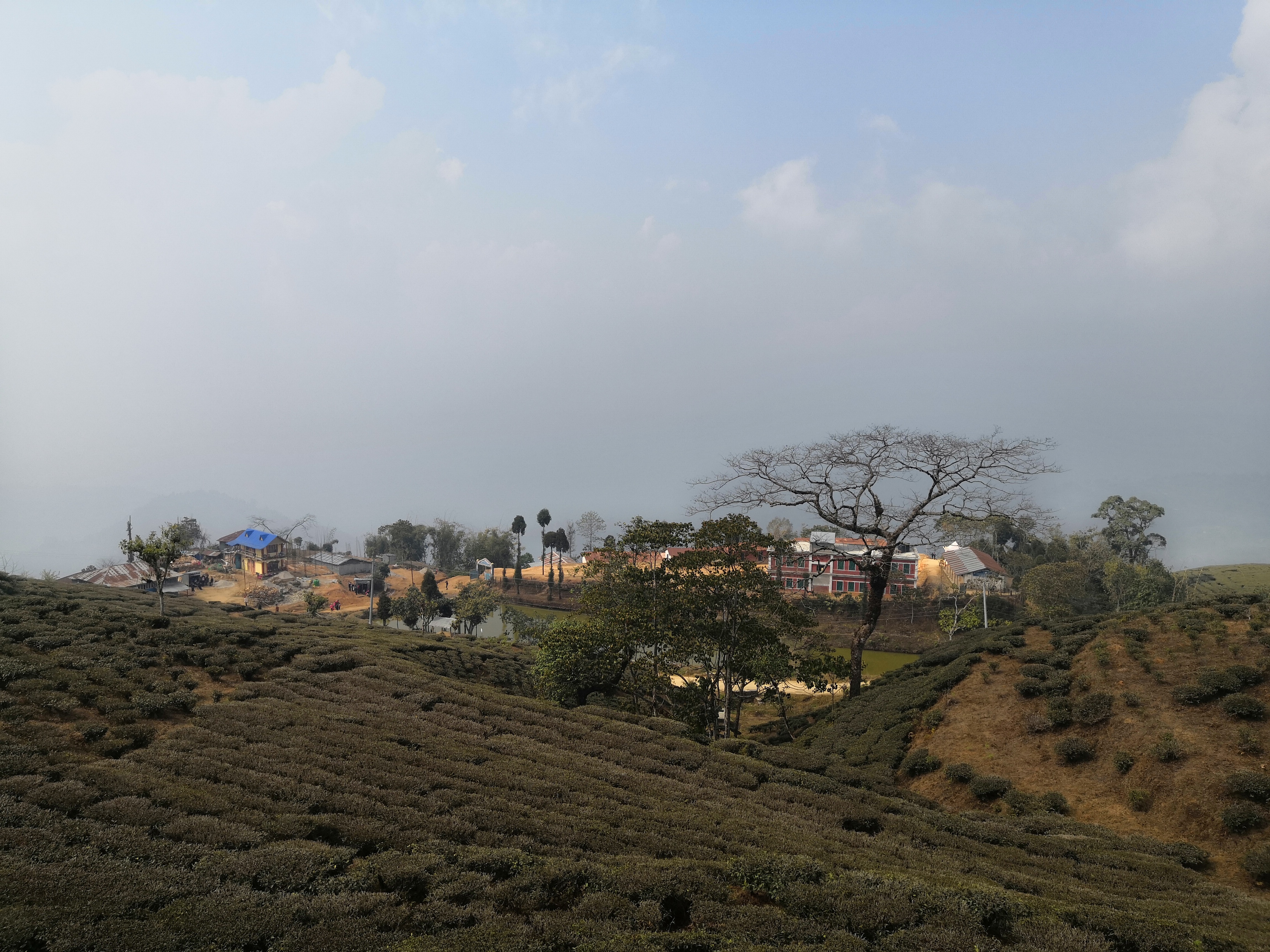
- Jyoti School Area, Laxmipur
- Interactive map of Laxmipur
- Country: Nepal
- Province: Province No. 1
- District: Ilam District
- Municipality: Suryodaya

Population (2001)
  - Total: 9,020
- Female 4,477 Male 4,543
- Time zone: UTC+5:45 (Nepal Time)

Laxmipur is a town and former Village Development Committee in Ilam District in the Province No. 1 of eastern Nepal.

Previously when Laxmipur was still a Village Development Committee it consisted of a total of nine numbered wards. After the political reformation of the country and being declared as the federal democratic republic of Nepal, Laxmipur was merged with Suryodaya Municipality in February 2017, together with some other villages of eastern Ilam. Laxmipur-1,2,4,8 now became Suryodaya-14 and Laxmipur 3-6-7-9 now became Suryodaya-13. Meanwhile, Laxmipur's southern and largest ward, ward no. 5 had been added to Mai Municipality as Mai-5.

As of 2001 the population of Laxmipur was 9,020 with a literacy rate of 67.10%.
