= Ghuseni =

Coordinates: 26°56′N 87°47′E

Dhuseni धुसेनी
- Village Development Committee
- Interactive map of Dhuseni
- Country: Nepal
- Province: Province No. 1
- District: Ilam District

Population (1991)
  - Total: 3,767
- Time zone: UTC+5:45 (Nepal Time)

Dhuseni is a town and Village Development Committee in Ilam District in the Province No. 1 of eastern Nepal. At the time of the 1991 Nepal census it had a population of 3,767 persons living in 705 individual households.
