= Samalbung =

Coordinates: 26°51′N 88°08′E

samalbung suryodaya-5
- Village Development Committee
- Interactive map of samalbung
- Country: Nepal
- Province: Province No. 1
- District: Ilam District

Population (1991)
  - Total: 4,106
- Time zone: UTC+5:45 (Nepal Time)

Samalbung is a town and Village Development Committee in Ilam District in the Province No. 1 of eastern Nepal. At the time of the 1991 Nepal census it had a population of 4,106 persons living in 776 individual households.
