= Sulubung =

Sulubung सुलुबुङ्ग्
- Village Development Committee
- Location in Nepal
- Coordinates: 27.02°N 87.95°E
- Country: Nepal
- Province: Province No. 1
- District: Ilam District

Population (1991)
  - Total: 3,470
- Time zone: UTC+5:45 (Nepal Time)
- Area code: 027

Sulubung is a village development committee in Ilam District in the Province No. 1 of eastern Nepal. At the time of the 1991 Nepal census it had a population of 3,470. Maipokhari, one of the major tourist and religious place of Nepal lies here. A company named Hesty Kiwi Private Limited has been established in this region which had helped to popularize this village with the plantation of kiwifruit. It is about 15 km from Ilam Bazaar. It is a hilly area having cold climate and mainly tea production is the income of most of the people here.

== Education ==
There are many government schools and few primary schools in this VDC.Most of the schools are primary and few are higher/secondary schools. One and only higher secondary school is Shree Saraswati Higher Secondary School. This is the most popular school in the whole district. Others are:

Maipokhari Secondary School

Shree Bal Niketan Primary school

East Sky Academy

New Happy Valley Boarding school, etc.

== Major villages of Sulubung ==
Yakpi

Gairigaun

Hutulung

Tari benshi

Mudhe

Dandakharka

Luringtaar

Talgaun

== Rivers ==
Maikhola

Sani Mai

Khahare khola

[4]
