= Ek Haatko Taali =

2009 book by Yubraj Nayaghare

- Cover page of the 3rd edition
- Author: Yubraj Nayaghare
- Original title: एक हातको ताली
- Language: Nepali
- Genre: Essay
- Published: 2009
- Publisher: Vidyarthi Pustak Bhandar
- Publication place: Nepal
- Media type: Print (Paperback)
- Pages: 191
- Awards: Madan Puraskar
- ISBN: 9789994613458

Ek Haatko Taali (Nepali: एक हातको ताली, lit. 'One-handed clap') is an essay collection written by Yubraj Nayaghare in 2009. It won the Madan Puraskar literary award in 2065 B.S. (2009).
