= Maimajhuwa =

Maimajhuwa माइमझुवा
- Village Development Committee
- Location in Nepal
- Coordinates: 27.08°N 87.96°E
- Country: Nepal
- Province: Province No. 1
- District: Ilam District

Population (1991)
  - Total: 3,543
- Time zone: UTC+5:45 (Nepal Time)

Maimajhuwa is a town and Village Development Committee in Ilam District in the Province No. 1 of eastern Nepal. At the time of the 1991 Nepal census it had a population of 3,543 persons living in 578 individual households.
