= Dhuseni, Lamjung =

Dhuseni, Gandaki धुसेनी
- Village development committee
- Location in Nepal Dhuseni, Gandaki (Nepal)
- Coordinates: 28.16°N 84.33°E
- Country: Nepal
- Zone: Gandaki Zone
- District: Lamjung District

Population (1991)
  - Total: 1,384
- Time zone: UTC+5:45 (Nepal Time)

Dhuseni is a village development committee in Lamjung District in the Gandaki Zone of northern-central Nepal. At the time of the 1991 Nepal census it had a population of 1384 people living in 267 individual households.
