= Puwamajhuwa =

Coordinates: 27°02′N 87°52′E

Puwamajwa पुवामझुवा गाविस
- Village Development Committee
- Interactive map of Puwamajwa
- Country: Nepal
- Province: Province No. 1
- District: Ilam District

Population (1991)
  - Total: 2,419
- Time zone: UTC+5:45 (Nepal Time)

Puwamajwa is a village and Village Development Committee in Ilam District in the Province No. 1 of eastern Nepal. At the time of the 1991 Nepal census it had a population of 2,419 persons living in 397 individual households.
