= Jamuna, Nepal =

Jamuna, Nepal जमुना
- Village Development Committee
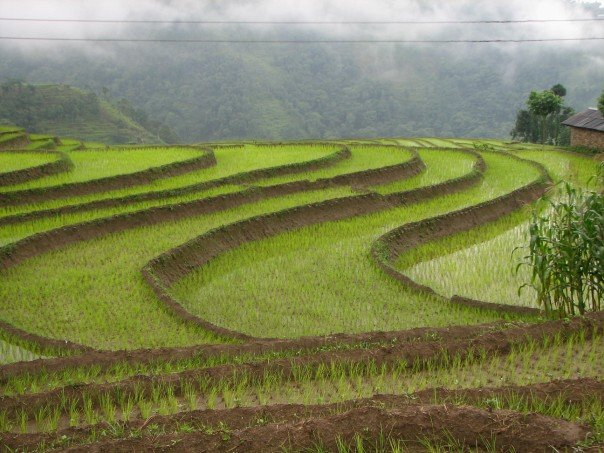
- A picture of Rice Fields in Jamuna, Nepal

- Location in Nepal
- Coordinates: 27°01′N 87°59′E
- Country: Nepal
- Province: Province No. 1
- District: Ilam District

Population (1991)
  - Total: 3,277
- Time zone: UTC+5:45 (Nepal Time)
- Postal code: 57309
- Area code: 027

Jamuna is a town and Village Development Committee in Ilam District in the Province No. 1 of eastern Nepal. At the time of the 1991 Nepal census it had a population of 3,277 persons living in 567 individual households.
