= Barbote =

Barbote बरबोटे
- Village Development Committee
- Location in Nepal
- Coordinates: 26.95°N 87.93°E
- Country: Nepal
- Province: Province No. 1
- District: Ilam District

Population (1991)
  - Total: 4,739
- Time zone: UTC+5:45 (Nepal Time)

Barbote was a town and Village Development Committee in Ilam District in the Province No. 1 of eastern Nepal. At the time of the 1991 Nepal census it had a population of 4,739 persons living in 876 individual households.

It was superseded by rural municipality in 2017.
