= Mahamai =

Mahamai महमाई
- Village Development Committee
- Location in Nepal
- Coordinates: 26.75°N 87.84°E
- Country: Nepal
- Province: Province No. 1
- District: Ilam District

Population (1991)
  - Total: 6,402
- Time zone: UTC+5:45 (Nepal Time)

Mahamai is a town and Village Development Committee in Ilam District in the Province No. 1 of eastern Nepal.

At the time of the 1991 Nepal census it had a population of 6,402 persons living in 1169 individual households.
