= Siddhithumka =

Siddhithumka सिद्धिथुम्का
- Village Development Committee
- Location in Nepal
- Coordinates: 26.85°N 87.84°E
- Country: Nepal
- Province: Province No. 1
- District: Ilam District

Population (1991)
  - Total: 2,937
- Time zone: UTC+5:45 (Nepal Time)

Siddhithumka is a village and Village Development Committee in Ilam District in the Province No. 1 of eastern Nepal. At the time of the 1991 Nepal census it had a population of 2,937 persons living in 545 individual households.
