= Lumde =

Lumde लुम्दे is a town and Village Development Committee in Ilam District in the Mechi Zone of eastern Nepal. At the time of the 1991 Nepal census it had a population of 2,473 persons living in 449 individual households.
