= Ektappa =

Ekatappa एकतप्पा
- Village Development Committee
- Location in Nepal
- Coordinates: 26.96°N 87.79°E
- Country: Nepal
- Province: Province No. 1
- District: Ilam District

Population (1991)
  - Total: 4,320
- Time zone: UTC+5:45 (Nepal Time)

Ekatappa is a town and Village Development Committee in Ilam District in the Province No. 1 of eastern Nepal. At the time of the 1991 Nepal census it had a population of 4,320 persons living in 784 individual households.

== Education ==
Ektappa VDC is supported by proper education facilities. Ektappa Multiple Campus is only one campus in the VDC which is providing bachelor level education. Singa Devi Higher Secondary School is government school which is providing quality of education in Ektappa VDC. Janaki Secondary School & Janakalyan Secondary School are other government schools which are providing secondary level education. There is a private school named Banasthali English Boarding School which is providing lower secondary level education in English medium environment. Additionally, a few other schools offer lower secondary education.

== Transportation ==
Transportation facility in this VDC is in developing stage. Daily Jeep services are available from Ilam Municipality and Birtamode. A new road is being constructed joining Ektappa and Damak of Jhapa district which will be much more helpful for people living in Ektappa VDC and its neighbouring VDCs. While auto rickshaws for local transportation, bikes and scooters can be used as personal transport too. Riding these vehicles is comparatively easier during the dry season than in the monsoon.

== Communication and entertainment ==
There is good facility of communication and entertainment in Ektappa VDC. Ncell's 4G service is available which supports in development Internet service. Similarly Nepal Telecom is another company which is providing 4G network service in Ektappa. National radio station Radio Nepal and other FM stations Kanchanjungha FM (92.6 MHz), Ilam FM (93 MHz), Bani FM (94.9 MHz), Chiyabari FM (88.2 MHz) and other radio channels can clearly be heard in the VDC. Dish Home is the only television service provider in the VDC, while different kind of fiber internet service providers are available for the internet service.
