= Erautar =

Iraotar इरौंटार
- Village Development Committee
- Location in Nepal
- Coordinates: 26.79°N 88.11°E
- Country: Nepal
- Province: Province No. 1
- District: Ilam District

Population (1991)
  - Total: 3,497
- Time zone: UTC+5:45 (Nepal Time)

Erautar is a town and Village Development Committee in Ilam District in the Province No. 1 of eastern Nepal. At the time of the 1991 Nepal census it had a population of 3,497 persons living in 624 individual households.
