= Danabari =

Danabari दानाबारी Garuwa
- Village Development Committee
- Location in Nepal
- Coordinates: 26.77°N 87.90°E
- Country: Nepal
- Zone: Province No 1
- District: Ilam District

Population (2011)
  - Total: 14,302
  - Male: 6,874
  - Female: 7,428
- Time zone: UTC+5:45 (Nepal Time)
- Households: 3137

Danabari is a town and Village Development Committee in Ilam District in the Province No. 1 of eastern Nepal. At the time of the 2011 Nepal census it had a population of 14,302 persons living in 1,492 individual households.

== Education ==
=== College, +2 Level and Schools ===
- Garuwa Multiple Campus
- Kankai Higher Secondary School (est. 2017 B.S.)
- Yuwa Barsha Secondary School
- New Light Secondary School
- SM Academy
- Shree Nepal Academy
- Laxmi Adarsha Secondary School
- Deep Jyoti Primary School, Katteltar
- Garuwa Primary School, Sukrabare etc.
