= Shantidanda =

Coordinates: 26°55′N 87°54′E

Shantidanda शान्तिडाँडा
- Village Development Committee
- Interactive map of Shantidanda
- Country: Nepal
- Province: Province No. 1
- District: Ilam District

Population (1991)
  - Total: 4,373
- Time zone: UTC+5:45 (Nepal Time)

Shantidanda is a town and Village Development Committee in Ilam District in the Province No. 1 of eastern Nepal. At the time of the 1991 Nepal census it had a population of 4,373 persons living in 794 individual households.
