= Sakhejung =

Sakhejung साँखेजुङ्ग
- Village Development Committee
- Location in Nepal
- Coordinates: 26.99°N 87.88°E
- Country: Nepal
- Province: Province No. 1
- District: Ilam District

Population (1991)
  - Total: 3,225
- Time zone: UTC+5:45 (Nepal Time)

Sakhejung is a town and Village Development Committee( now ilam municipality word no. 01) in Ilam District in the Province No. 1 of eastern Nepal. At the time of the 1991 Nepal census it had a population of 3,225 persons living in 571 individual households.
