= Sakphara =

Sakphara साकफारा
- Village Development Committee
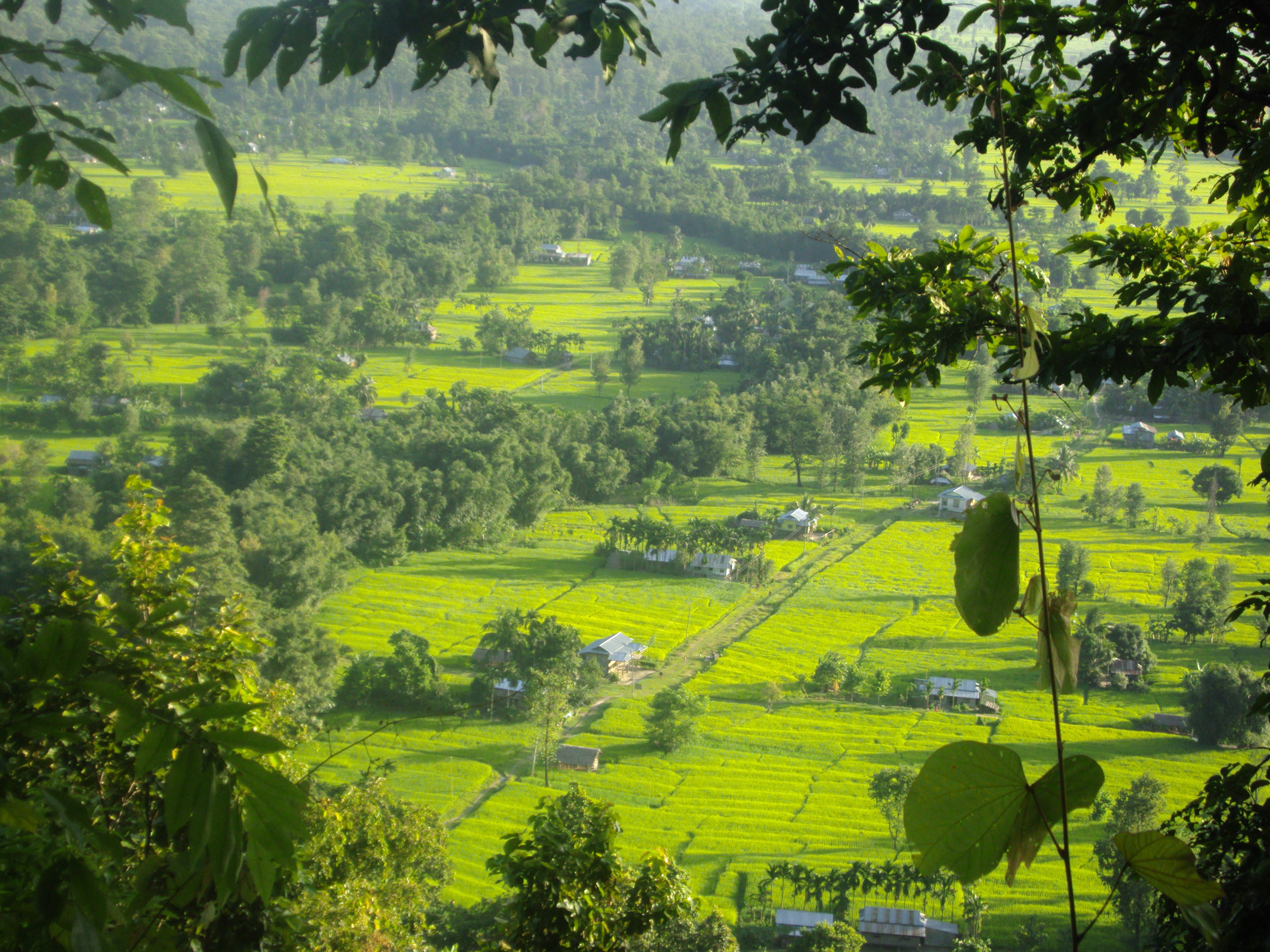
- Sakphara

- Location in Nepal
- Coordinates: 26.84°N 87.66°E
- Country: Nepal
- Province: Province No. 1
- District: Ilam District

Population (1991)
  - Total: 3,004
- Time zone: UTC+5:45 (Nepal Time)

Sakphara is a town and Village Development Committee in Ilam District in the Province No. 1 of eastern Nepal. At the time of the 1991 Nepal census it had a population of 3,004 persons living in 512 individual households.
