= Banjho =

Bajho बाँझो गाविस
- Village Development Committee
- Location in Nepal
- Coordinates: 26.80°N 87.72°E
- Country: Nepal
- Province: Province No. 1
- District: Ilam District

Population (1991)
  - Total: 20,218
- Time zone: UTC+5:45 (Nepal Time)

Bajho was a town and village development committee in Ilam District in the Province No. 1 of eastern Nepal. At the time of the 1991 Nepal census, it had a population of 20,218 people living in 3586 individual households.

It was superseded by a rural municipality in 2017.
