= Deumai Municipality =

Deumai Municipality देउमाई नगरपालिका
- Municipality
- Location in Province No. 1 Deumai Municipality (Nepal)
- Coordinates: 26°55′59″N 87°49′31″E
- Country: Nepal
- Region: Eastern
- Zone: Mechi Zone
- District: Ilam District
- Established: 2014

Government
  - Mayor: Surya Prsasd Pokharel (NCP)
  - Deputy Mayor: Pawi Maya Rai (NCP)

Area
  - Total: 50.7 km^{2} (19.6 sq mi)

Population (2011 Nepal census)
  - Total: 10,946
  - Density: 216/km^{2} (559/sq mi)
- Time zone: UTC+5:45 (NST)
- Website: deumaimun.gov.np

Deumai is a municipality in the eastern development region of Ilam District in the Mechi Zone of Nepal. The new municipality was formed by merging two existing villages Mangalbare and Dhuseni on 02 Dec 2014. The office of the municipality is that of the former Mangalbare village development committee.

== Population ==
Deumai municipality was formed in 2014 by merging Mangalbare and Dhuseni; it has a total population of 10,946 according to 2011 Nepal census.
