= Namsaling =

Namsaling नाम्सालिङ
- Village Development Committee
- Location in Nepal
- Coordinates: 26.92°N 87.99°E
- Country: Nepal
- Province: Province No. 1
- District: Ilam District

Population (1991)
  - Total: 4,978
- Time zone: UTC+5:45 (Nepal Time)

Namsaling is a town and Village Development Committee in Ilam District in the Province No. 1 of eastern Nepal. At the time of the 1991 Nepal census it had a population of 4,978 persons living in 905 individual households.

This VDC is situated in the middle east part of the district.
