= Soyak =

Coordinates: 26°51′N 87°52′E

Soyak सोयाक
- Village Development Committee
- Interactive map of Soyak
- Country: Nepal
- Province: Province No. 1
- District: Ilam District

Population (1991)
  - Total: 2,758
- Time zone: UTC+5:45 (Nepal Time)

Soyak is a town and Village Development Committee in Ilam District in the Province No. 1 of eastern Nepal. At the time of the 1991 Nepal census, it had a population of 2,758 living in 494 individual households.
