= Ilam District =

Coordinates: 26°54′N 87°56′E

Ilam District इलाम जिल्ला
- District
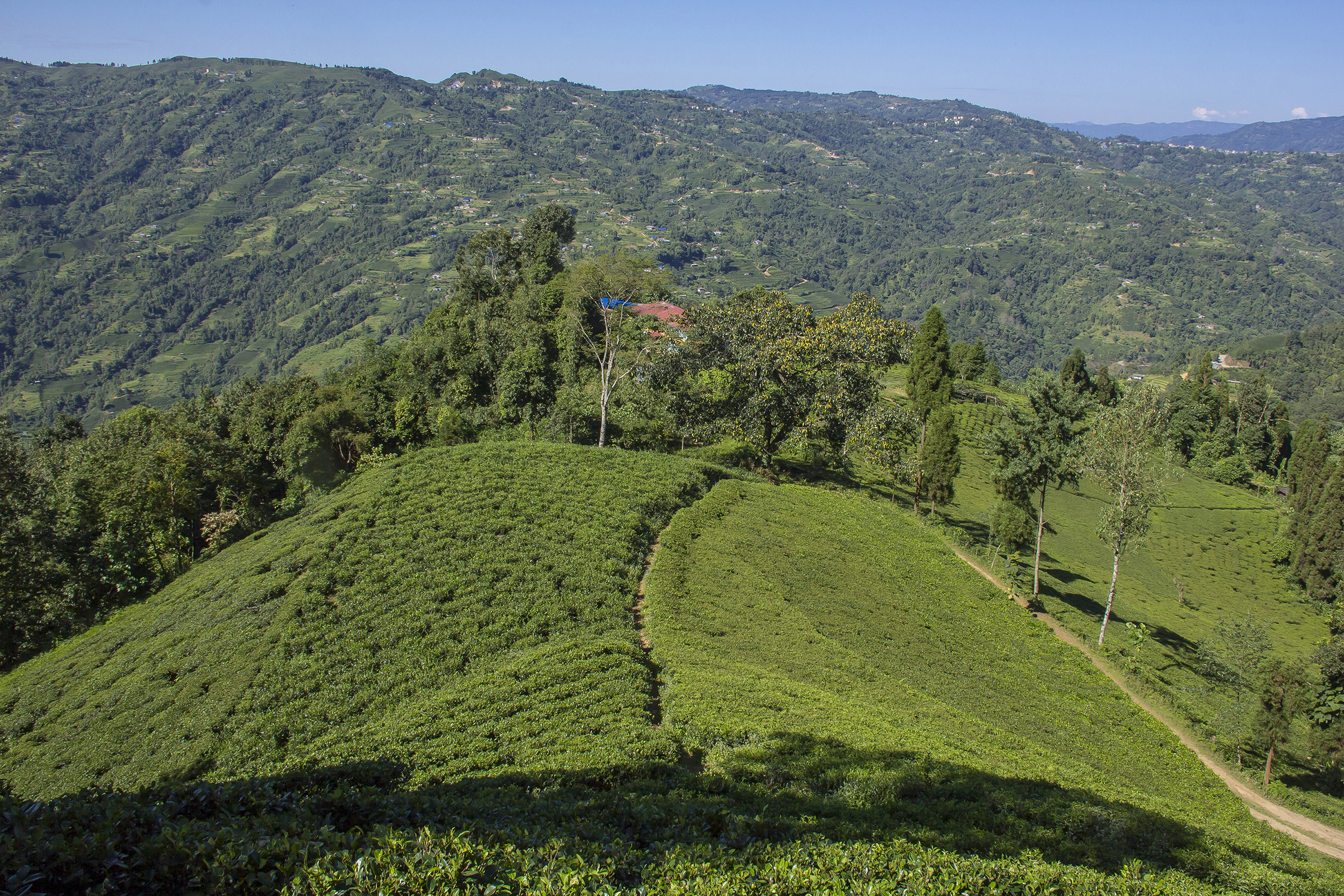
- Lush Green Tea Gardens are what makes Ilam district popular.

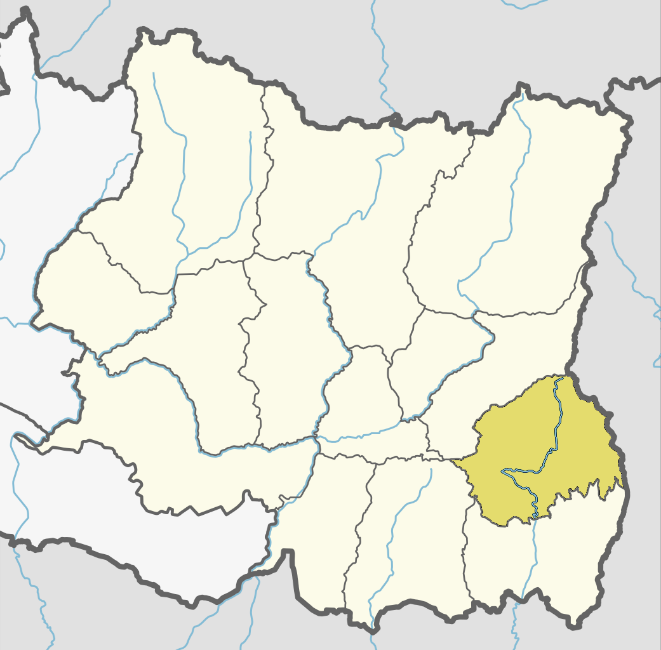

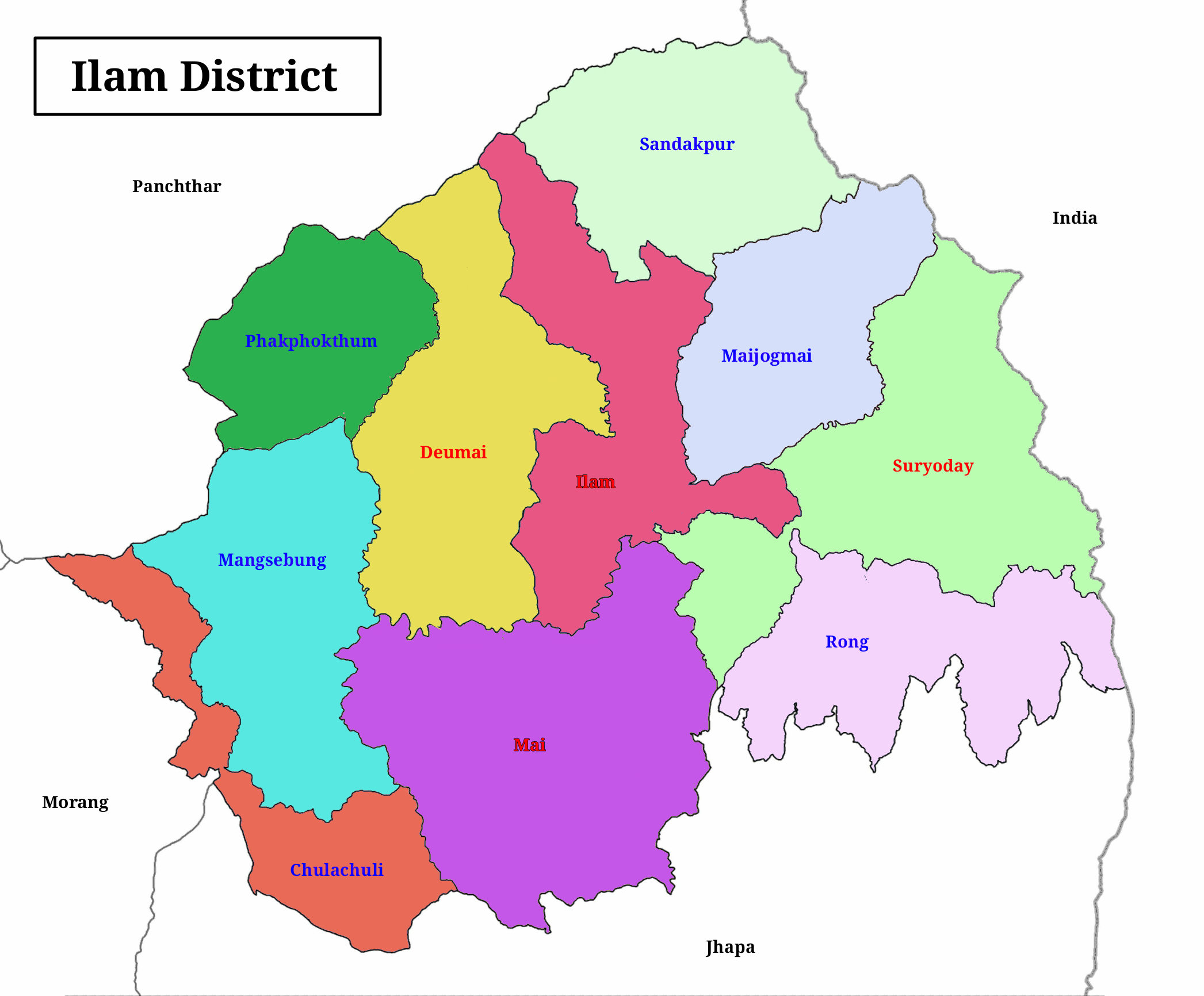
- Country: Nepal
- Province: Koshi Province
- Admin HQ.: Ilam

Government
  - Type: Coordination committee
  - Body: DCC, Ilam
  - Head: Mr. Ganesh Prasad Baral
  - Deputy-Head: Mrs. Chitrakala Baraili
  - Parliamentary constituencies: 2
  - Provincial constituencies: 4

Area
  - Total: 1,703 km^{2} (658 sq mi)
- Highest elevation: 3,636 m (11,929 ft)

Population (2021)
  - Total: 279,534
  - Density: 164.1/km^{2} (425.1/sq mi)

Demographics
  - Ethnic groups: (2021): Rai 20%; Limbu 17%; Hil- Brahmin 14%; Chhetri 14%; Tamang 7%; Magar 5%; Others 21%
- Time zone: UTC+05:45 (NPT)
- Main Language(s): Limbu Nepali, Rai
- Website: www.ddcilam.gov.np

Ilam district (Nepali: इलाम जिल्ला) is one of 14 districts of Koshi Province of eastern Nepal. It is a Hill district and covers 1,703 km^{2} (658 sq mi). The 2021 census counted 279,534, inhabitants. The municipality of Ilam is the district headquarters and is about 600 km (370 mi) from Kathmandu.

Ilam attracts many researchers and scientists for the study of medicinal and aromatic plants, orchids, rare birds and the red panda. Ilam stretches from the Terai belt to the upper hilly belt of this Himalayan nation.

== Etymology ==
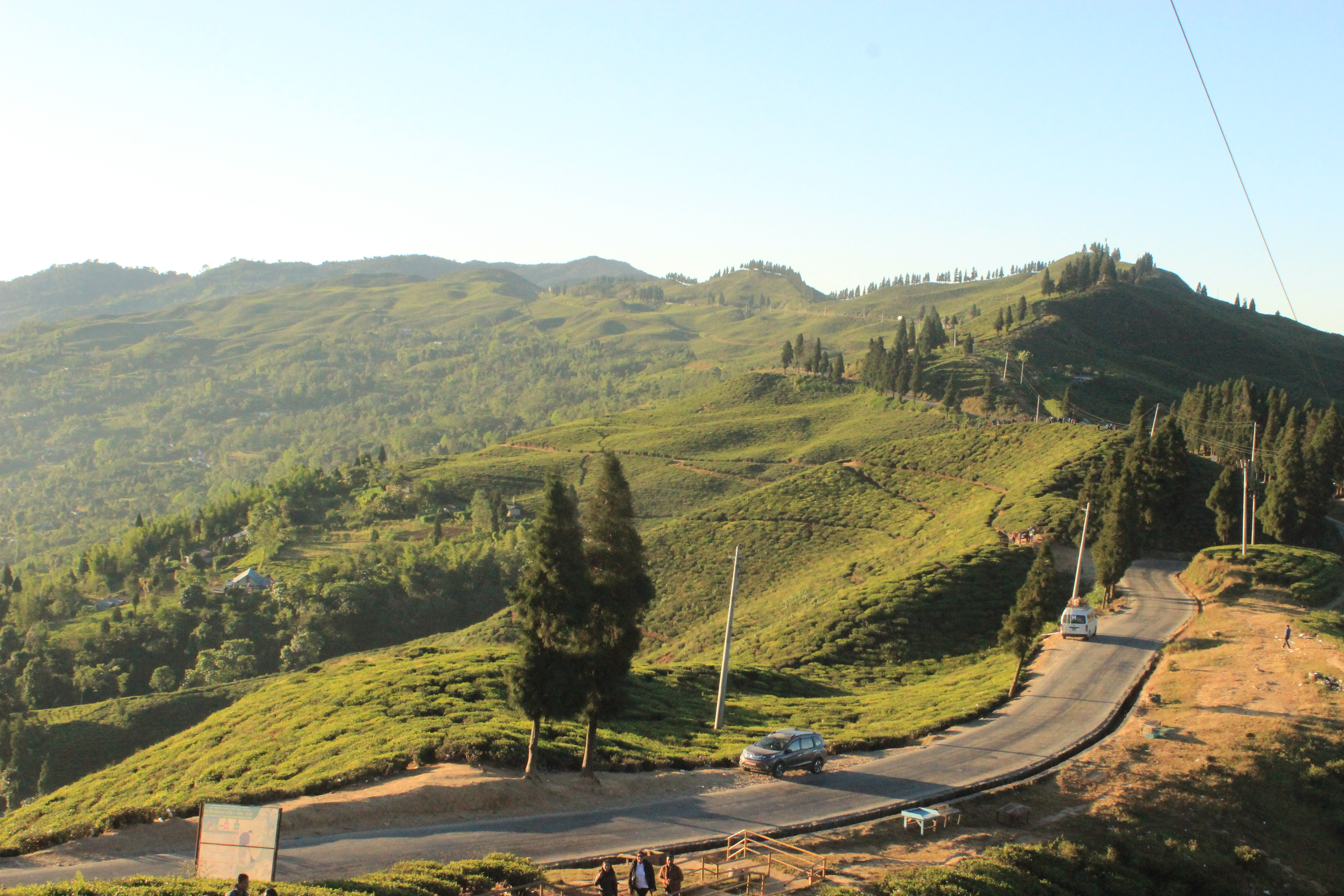
Kanyam Tea Garden

The name Ilam is derived from the Limbu language in which "IL" means twisted and "Lam" means road. Ilam was one of the ten self ruling states of Limbuwan before the reunification of Nepal. Its ruler, King Hangshu Phuba Lingdom of Lingdom dynasty, ruled Ilam as a confederate state of Limbuwan until 1813 AD. The treaty between the other Limbuwan states and the King of Gorkha (Gorkha-Limbuwan Treaty of 1774 AD), and the conflict of Gorkha and Sikkim, led to the unification of Ilam with Gorkha. Ilam was the last of the ten kingdoms of Limbuwan to be reunified into Nepal. The King of Gorkha gave the ruler of Ilam full autonomy to rule and the right of Kipat. Ilam was an independent Limbu kingdom until 1714 AD.

== Development and culture ==
Ilam is today one of the developing places in Nepal, even though the Western parts are still struggling with the basic facilities (road networks, drinking water, healthcare facilities, etc.). The migration rate is very low, compared to other districts, due to the adoption of farming by individual families. Ilam Orthodox Tea (Green Tea, Silver Tea , Golden Tea), a famous leaf tea, is one of the finest quality teas in the world and is exported to Europe, Australia and the United States. The main source of income in this district is commercial agriculture, especially cash crops like tea, cardamom, ginger, potato, broom grass (Thysanolaena latifolia) production on a large scale and dairy and dairy related products like milk (Olan), cheese, Chhurpi (traditional hard cheese) also known as dog chew and lollipops (local sweets). In recent years, the production of Chhurpi has evolved into a significant export industry, with local digital media reports highlighting its growing demand as a natural dog chew in international markets like the U.S. and Europe.

Ilam is also considered to be an educational hub, where students from Ilam, Panchthar, Taplejung and Jhapa are plentiful. There are several institutions that offer secondary, higher secondary and university level programs. For a decade, there has been a growing number of technical and vocational programs at secondary and university levels. Mahendra Ratna Multiple Campus, the oldest institution in Ilam, is one of the constituent campuses of Tribhuvan University. The first autonomous campus of Nepal, it is well known for its programs such as Agricultural Science, Education, Humanities and Commerce. The campus launched a Bachelor of Science program in Horticulture in 2012 (B.S. 2069), which has attracted students from all over the Nepal.

Ilam is well known for its religious importance too. The Devi temples have a great importance attached to them and many people come here just for pilgrimage. The major attraction of Ilam is the nine-cornered Mai Pokhari lake. Also known as the Abode of the Goddess, many tourists as well as Nepalese people come to visit this place. This place is also one of the most famous places for flora and fauna, which attracts biologists. Similarly, Gajurmukhi is also a religious spot for pilgrimages from Nepal and India. The Mai river and its four tributaries also emerge in the Ilam district. Sano Pathivara is another place that is famous for pilgrimage. The famous Mane Bhanjyang (Mane pass) connects Ilam with the Darjeeling district of West Bengal, India. You must visit Fikkal and Kanyam.

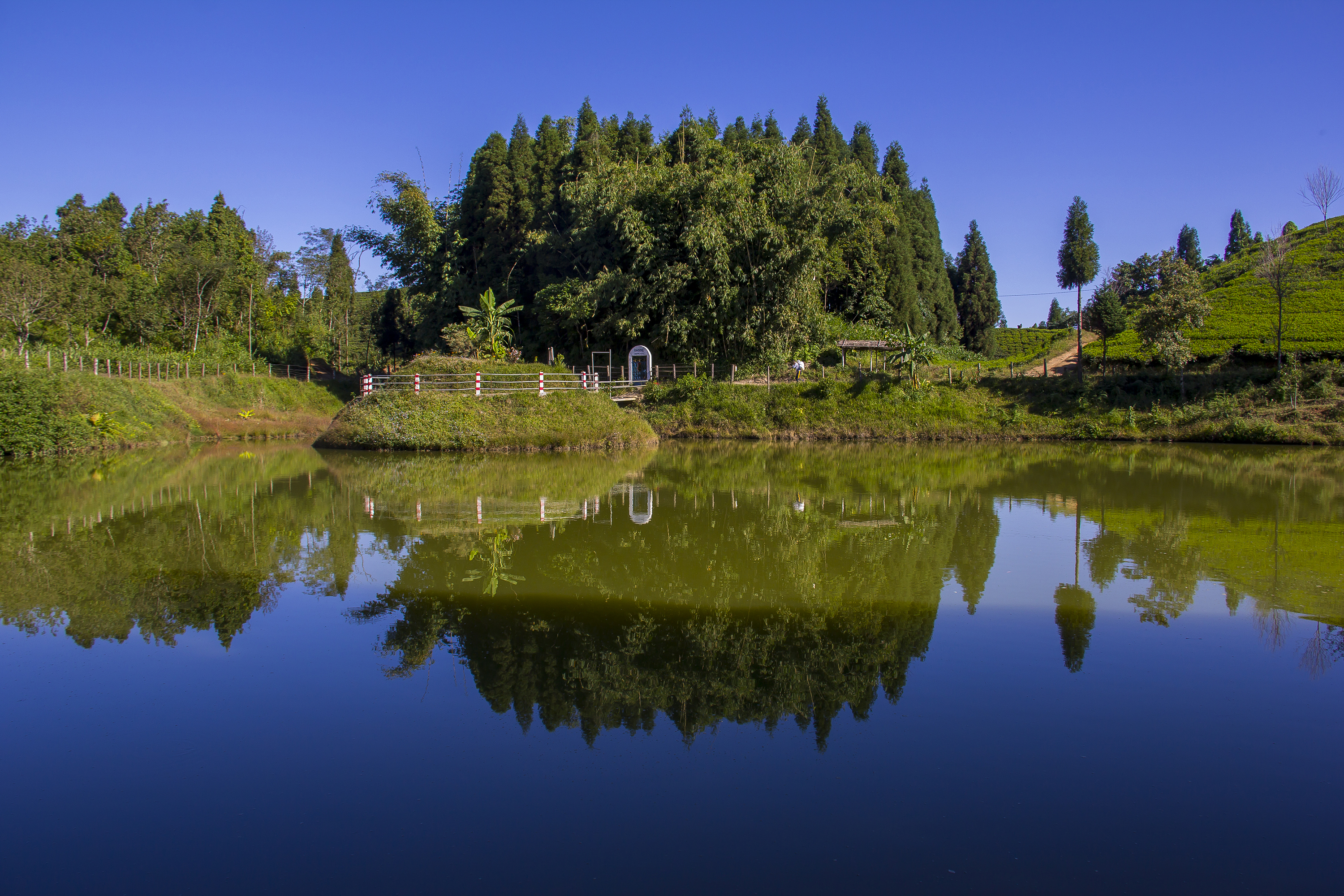
Antu Pond, reflecting the color of its surroundings

Ilam was in the news a great deal during the Maoist insurgency, as it was from there that Maoists launched frequent, massive attacks.

== Geography and climate ==
Climate Zone	Elevation Range	% of Area
Lower Tropical	below 300 meters (1,000 ft)	15.5%
Upper Tropical	300 to 3,000 meters (1,000 to 3,300 ft.)	33.5%
Subtropical	1,000 to 2,000 meters (3,300 to 6,600 ft.)	40.1%
Temperate	2,000 to 3,000 meters (6,400 to 9,800 ft.)	10.6%
Subalpine	3,000 to 4,000 meters (9,800 to 13,100 ft.)	0.3%

== Demographics ==
Historical population
Year	Pop.	±% p.a.
1981	178,356	—
1991	229,214	+2.54%
2001	282,806	+2.12%
2011	290,254	+0.26%
2021	279,534	−0.38%

At the time of the 2021 Nepal census, Ilam District had a population of 279,534. Ilam has a literacy rate of 83.4% and a sex ratio of 1005 females per 1000 males. 166,513 (59.60%) lived in municipalities.

Ethnicity/caste of Ilam district (2021)
1. Rai (20.8%)
2. Limbu (16.1%)
3. Chhetri (13.9%)
4. Bahun (12.7%)
5. Tamang (7.06%)
6. Magar (5.21%)
7. Newar (3.76%)
8. Kami (3.50%)
9. Gurung (3.04%)
10. Other Hill Janjati (10.3%)
11. Other Khas Dalit (1.91%)
12. Others (1.72%)

Ethnicity/caste: 20.79% were Rai, 16.10% Limbu, 13.90% Chhetri, 12.72% Bahun, 7.06% Tamang, 5.21% Magar, 3.76% Newar, 3.50% Kami and 3.04% Gurung. The Janjati communities are in majority here.

Religion in Ilam District (2021)
Religion	Percent
Hinduism	44.19%
Kirat Mundhum	36.20%
Buddhism	15.96%
Christianity	3.51%
Other or not stated	0.14%

Religion: 44.19% were Hindu, 36.20% Kirat, 15.96% Buddhist and 3.51% Christian.

Languages of Ilam district (2021)
1. Nepali (54.3%)
2. Limbu (13.7%)
3. Bantawa (7.53%)
4. Rai (4.81%)
5. Tamang (4.58%)
6. Magar Dhut (3.56%)
7. Chamling (1.25%)
8. Newar (1.00%)
9. Gurung (1.00%)
10. Others (8.27%)

Nepali was the majority language in Ilam in 2021, spoken by 54.29% of the population as their first language. Other languages were Limbu (13.71%), Bantawa (7.53%), Rai (4.81%), Tamang (4.58%), Magar Dhut (3.56%), Chamling (1.25%), Newari and Gurung (1.00%). Other languages spoken here include Lepcha, which was the aboriginal language of neighbouring Sikkim and the Darjeeling Hills in India. In 2011, Nepali was spoken by 42.8% of the population as their first language. It seems that in Ilam, as in much of eastern Nepal, the Janjatis are abandoning their own languages in favour of Nepali.

== Divisions ==
Ilam is divided into 4 urban and 6 rural municipalities.

No.	Type	Name	Nepali	Population (2011)	Area	Website
1	Urban	Ilam	इलाम	48536	173.32	
2	Urban	Deumai	देउमाई	32927	191.63	
3	Urban	Mai Municipality	माई	32576	264.09	
4	Urban	Suryodaya	सूर्योदय	56691	252.52	
5	Rural	Phakphokthum	फाकफोकथुम	21,619	108.79	
6	Rural	Mai Jogmai	माईजोगमाई	21,044	172.41	
7	Rural	Chulachuli	चुलाचुली	20,820	108.46	
8	Rural	Rong	रोङ	19,135	155.06	
9	Rural	Mangsebung	माङसेबुङ	18,503	142.41	
10	Rural	Sandakpur	सन्दकपुर	16,065	156.01	
	District	Ilam	ईलाम			

=== Former Village Development Committees and Municipalities ===
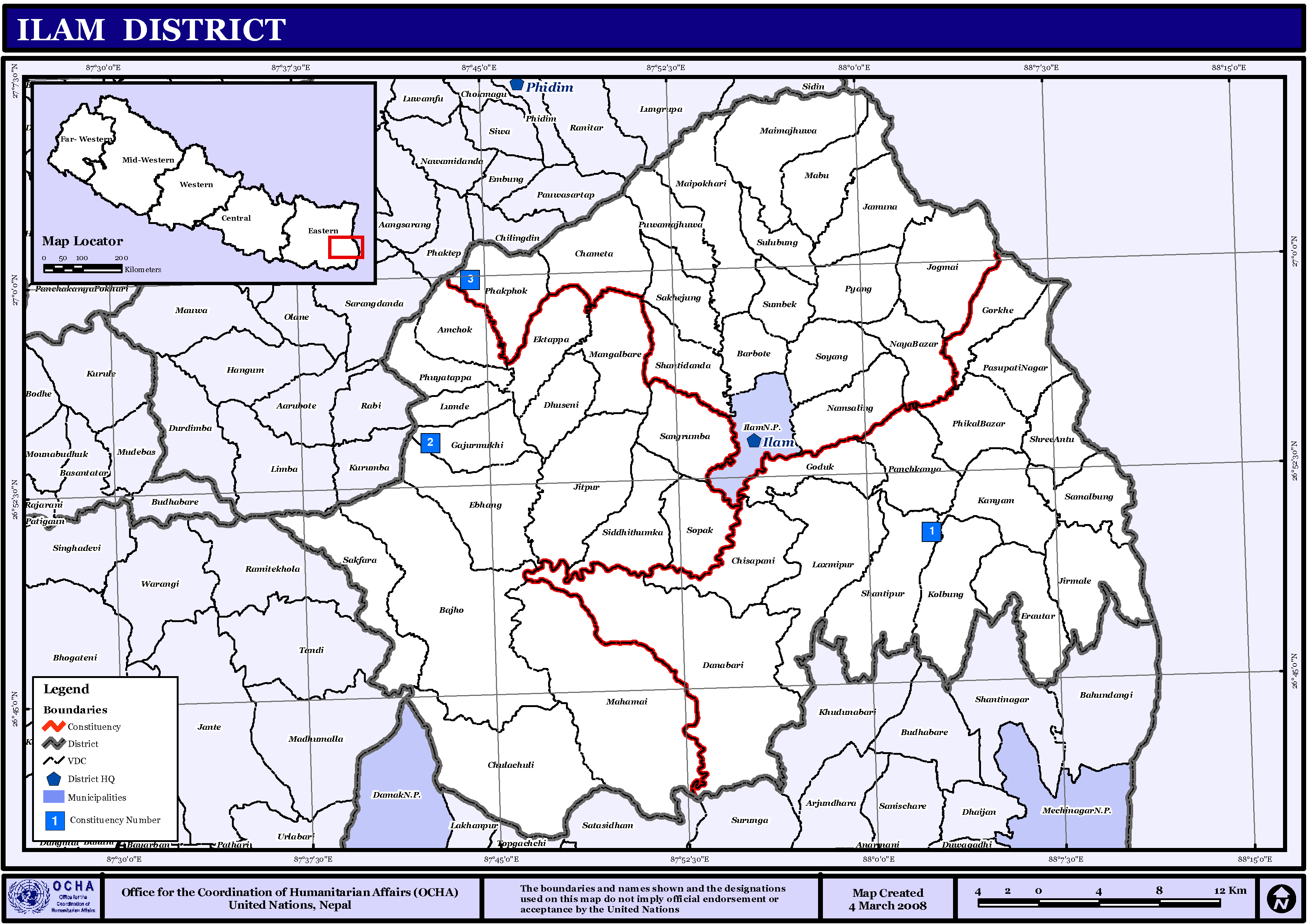
Map of the VDCls in Ilam District

- Amchok
- Banjho
- Barbote
- Chamaita (now deumai municipality)
- Chisapani
- Chulachuli
- Danabari
- Deumai Municipality
- Dhuseni (now Deumai Municipality)
- Ibhang
- Ektappa
- Erautar
- Gajurmukhi
- Ghuseni
- Godak
- Gorkhe
- Jamuna
- Ilam Municipality
- Jirmale
- Jitpur
- Jogmai
- Kolbung
- Lakshmipur
- Lumde
- Mabu
- Mahamai
- Maimajhuwa
- Maipokhari
- Mangalbare (now Deumai Municipality)
- Namsaling
- Naya Bazar
- Pashupatinagar
- Phakphok
- Phuyatappa
- Puwamajhuwa
- Pyang
- Sakphara
- Sakhejung
- Samalbung
- Sangrumba
- Shanti Danda
- Shantipur
- Siddhithumka
- Soyak
- Soyang
- Shree Antu
- Sulubung
- Sumbek
- Suryodaya Municipality

== Notable people ==
Ilam district is home to notable personalities including sportspersons and politicians.

- Nawayug Shrestha, National Football Player
- Darshan Gurung, National Football Player
- Anjila Tumbapo Subba, National Football Captain
- Jhala Nath Khanal, Politician
- Subas Chandra Nemwang, Politician
- Suhang Nembang, Politician

== See also ==
- Zones of Nepal
- Danabari
