= Gajurmukhi =

Gajurmukhi गजुरमुखी
- Village Development Committee
- Location in Nepal
- Coordinates: 26.90°N 87.74°E
- Country: Nepal
- Province: Province No. 1
- District: Ilam District

Population (1991)
  - Total: 3,000
- Time zone: UTC+5:45 (Nepal Time)
- Postal code: 57306
- Area code: 027

Gajurmukhi is a town and Village Development Committee in Ilam District in the Province No. 1 of eastern Nepal. At the time of the 1991 Nepal census it had a population of 3,000 persons living in 532 individual households.
