= Chamaita, Ilam =

Chamaita चमैता गाविस
- Village development committee
- Location in eastern part of Nepal
- Coordinates: 27.01°N 87.82°E
- Country: Nepal
- Province: Province No. 1
- District: Ilam District

Population (1991)
  - Total: 5,229
- Time zone: UTC+5:45 (Nepal Time)

Chamaita is a town and village development committee in Ilam District in the Province No. 1 of eastern Nepal. At the time of the 1991 Nepal census, it had a population of 5,229 people living in 863 individual households.
