= Phuyatappa =

Phuyatappa फुँएतप्पा
- Village Development Committee
- Location in Nepal
- Coordinates: 26.94°N 87.72°E
- Country: Nepal
- Province: Province No. 1
- District: Ilam District

Population (1991)
  - Total: 3,591
- Time zone: UTC+5:45 (Nepal Time)

Phuyatappa is a town and Village Development Committee in Ilam District in the Province No. 1 of eastern Nepal. At the time of the 2011 Nepal census it had a population of 3,638 persons living in 840 individual households. The male population was 1667 while the female population was 1971 The village now lies in ward number 4 of Phakphokthum Rural Municipality of Ilam District after the political and structural changes of 2017 AD.

The majority of houses are rented by own built by mud/bricks/stones with Galvanized roof. More than 85% of the Households use the tap water as source of drinking water and almost 97% use the firewood for cooking purpose.

The major ethnicity of this village is Magar, followed Limbu, Brahamin, Rai, Newar and Dalits. This area is very fertile for the commercial crops such as cardamom, tea, ginger, as well as many horticultural commodities.
