= Amchok =

Place in Nepal

Amchok आमचोक
- Village Development Committee
- Location in Nepal
- Coordinates: 26.97°N 87.73°E
- Country: Nepal
- Province: Province No. 1
- District: Ilam District

Population (1991)
  - Total: 4,288
- Time zone: UTC+5:45 (Nepal Time)

Amchok was a town and Village Development Committee in Ilam District in the Province No. 1 of eastern Nepal. At the time of the 1991 Nepal census it had a population of 4288 persons living in 755 individual households.

It was supersede by rural municipality in 2017.
