= Jitpur, Ilam =

Coordinates: 26°50′N 87°47′E

Jitpur जीतपुर
- Village Development Committee
- Interactive map of Jitpur
- Country: Nepal
- Province: Province No. 1
- District: Ilam District

Population (1991)
  - Total: 5,454
- Time zone: UTC+5:45 (Nepal Time)

Jitpur is a town and Village Development Committee in Ilam District in the Province No. 1 of eastern Nepal. At the time of the 1991 Nepal census it had a population of 5,454 persons residing in 989 individual households.

== History ==
Jitpur was known as 'Winner' where dominated Limbu communities campaign for fighting for their areas and land in ancient even medieval era; there was a tradition of an arranged fight during Phagupurnima or Ramnawami fairs in March/April every year till the 1990s. Jitpur used to be known as Dhukuti of Ilam (main source of rice), very fertile land with full of terraces of paddy fields with ample irrigation. These days, Jitpur is one of the popular areas for quality product of green-tea, ginger, broom and black cardamom.

== Geography ==
Jitpur Village Development Committee (VDC) lies right in the middle of Ilam district. The Jitpur VDC has neighbouring Mangalbare VDC on North, Sangrumba VDC on the East and Sidhithumka VDC on the west. It is border with a small stream called, Lewa khola (stream) with Mangalbare VDC. It consists of nine wards, with a central office in ward number 4, Nawami where a 10 plus 2 school and a few retail shops are allocated. Jitpur is accessible with a gravel motorable road with bus services in the winter and 4x4 taxis even monsoon seasons. It takes about 2 hours drive from Ilam and 3–5 hours on foot.

== Society ==
This village has varieties of integrated communities of Rais, Magars, Limbus, Tamangs, BKs, Tailors, Giri, Bramans, Kshetris and others together.
