= Maipokhari =

Maipokhari माइपोखरी
- Village Development Committee
- Location in Nepal
- Coordinates: 27.05°N 87.90°E
- Country: Nepal
- Province: Province No. 1
- District: Ilam District

Population (2011)
  - Total: 4,348
- Time zone: UTC+5:45 (Nepal Time)

Maipokhari is a town and Village Development Committee in Ilam District in Province No. 1 of eastern Nepal. At the 1991 Nepal census, it had a population of 4,348 persons in 931 individual households.
