= Kala Pokhri =

Himalayan village in Darjeeling district, West Bengal, India

Kalipokhri
- Village
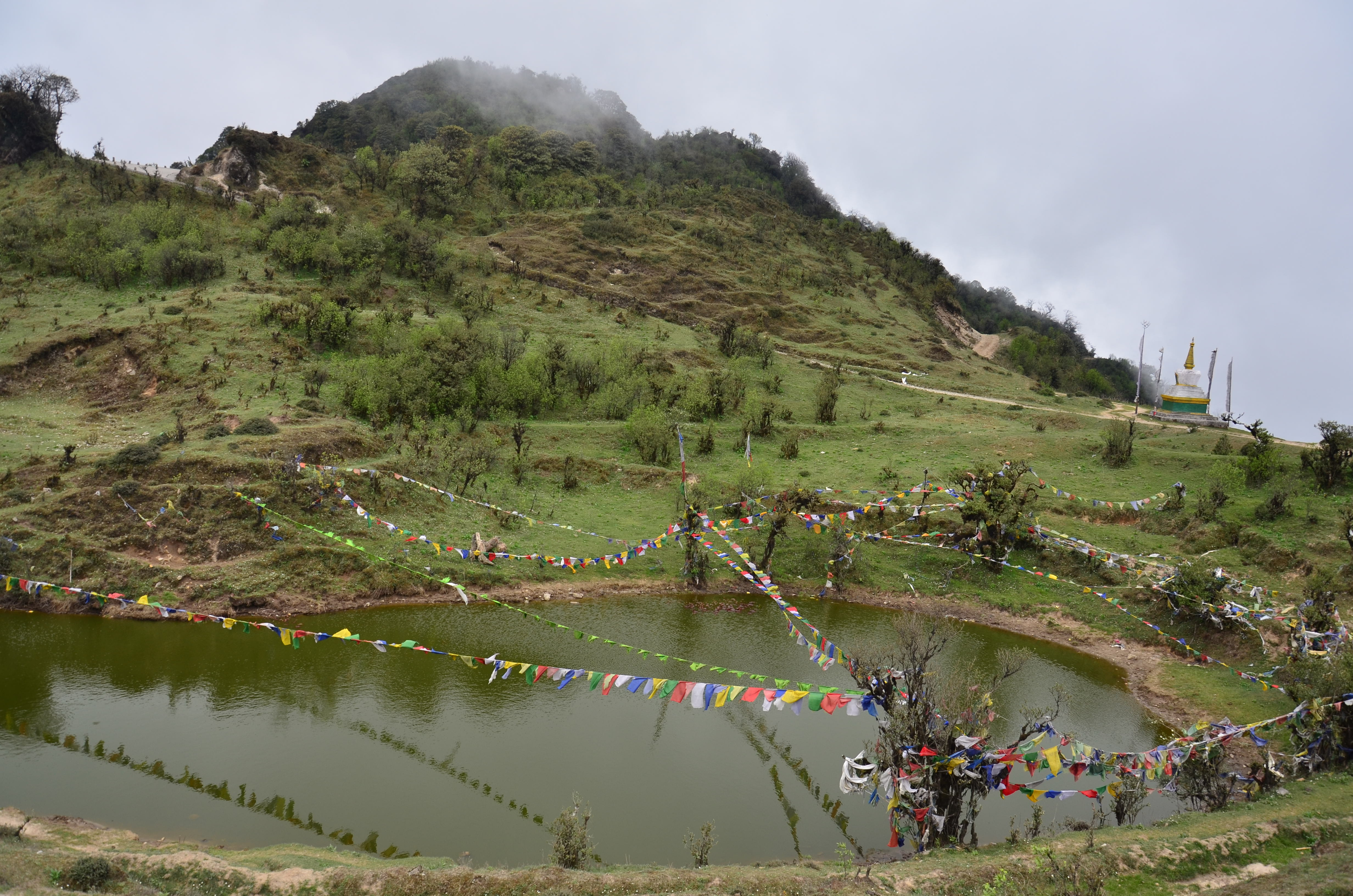
- lake Kala Pokhri

- Location in West Bengal, India Kalipokhri (India)
- Coordinates: 27.04°N 88.00°E
- Country: India
- State: West Bengal
- District: Darjeeling

Languages
  - Official: Bengali, English
- Time zone: UTC+5:30 (IST)
- ISO 3166 code: IN-WB

Kalipokhri (3186 m) is a small Himalayan village inside the Singalila National Park in the Darjeeling subdivision, Darjeeling district in the state of West Bengal, India. It lies on the trekking route from Mane Bhanjang to Sandakphu (the highest peak in West Bengal), and is roughly halfway between the steep final stretch of the trek from Gairibans to Sandakphu. The word, "Pokhri" means "lake" and "kala" means "dark" in Nepali, and the village is named after a local lake with dark waters or a lake whose water is dark in color. The lake is of extreme religious significance to the locals. Opposite the lake a border check post of Nepal Army is situated.

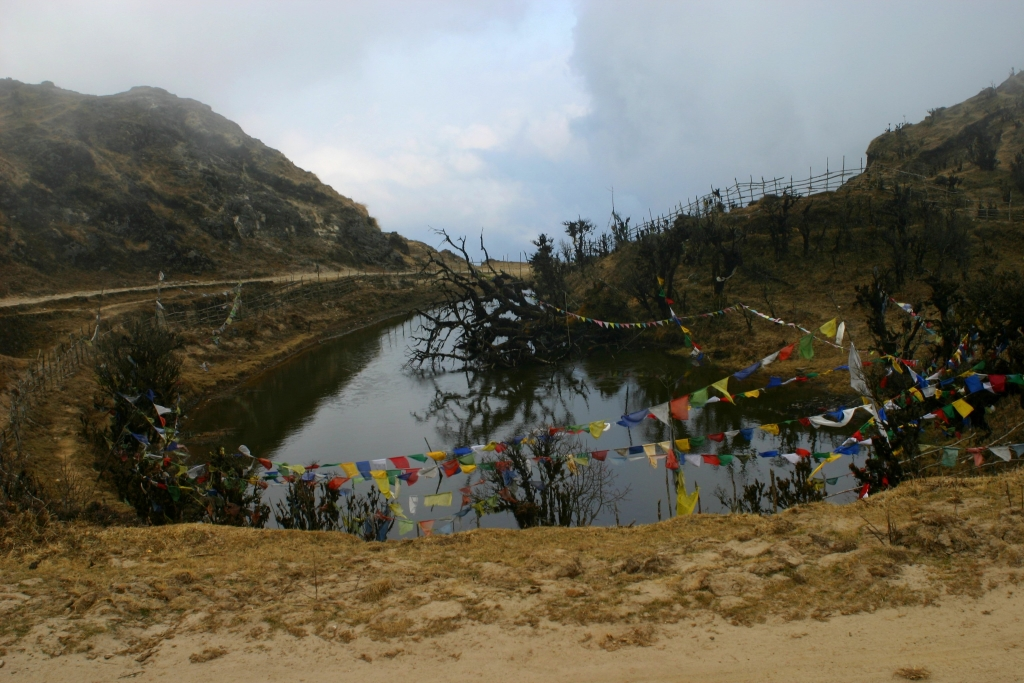
lake Kala Pokhri

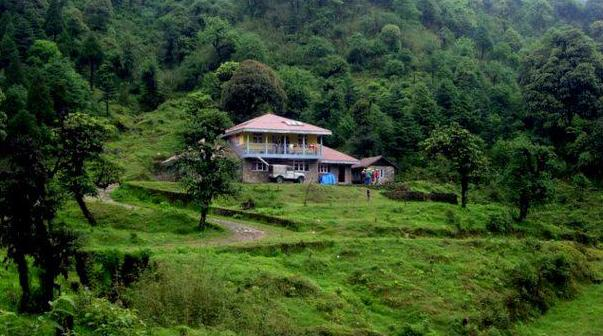
trekking hut in Gairibans
