= Tonglu, West Bengal =

Tonglu
- village
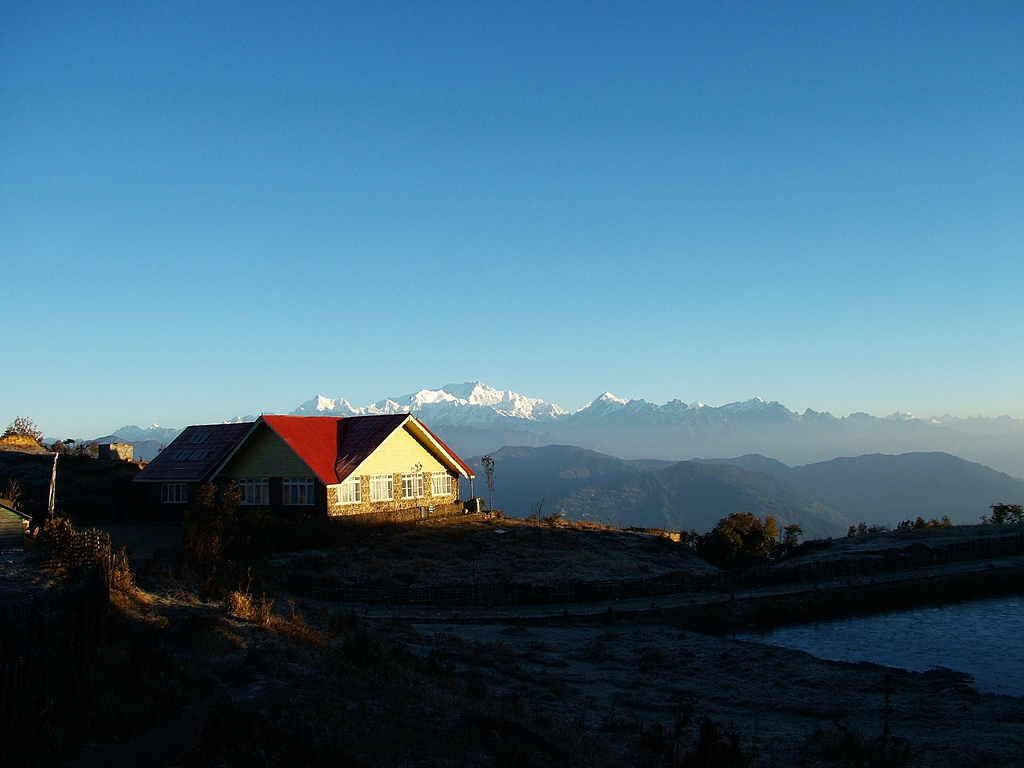
- The trekkers' hut at Tonglu

- Location in West Bengal, India Tonglu (India)
- Coordinates: 27.03°N 88.09°E
- Country: India
- State: West Bengal
- District: Darjeeling

Government
  - Body: Gram panchayat
- Elevation: 4,170 m (13,680 ft)

Languages
  - Official: Nepali Bengali English
- Time zone: UTC+5:30 (IST)
- ISO 3166 code: IN-WB

Tonglu (4200 m above mean sea level) is one of the higher peaks of the Singalila Ridge and a small settlement inside the Singalila National Park in the Darjeeling subdivision, Darjeeling district in the state of West Bengal in India near the India - Nepal border. It is a roadside halt along the trekking route from Manebhanjan to Sandakphu. It has a number of guest houses and homestays for faring trekkers and tourists on their way to Sandakphu.

It was also known as Tonglo in the 1800s. Sir Joseph Dalton Hooker carried out many plant hunting expeditions in Darjeeling and Sikkim.

== Geography ==
Places and tea estates in the north-western portion of Darjeeling Sadar subdivision (including Darjeeling Pulbazar CD block) in Darjeeling district
CT: census town, R: rural/ urban centre, N: neighbourhood, H: hill centre, NP: national park/ wildlife sanctuary, TE: tea estate, TA: tourist attraction
Abbreviations used in names – TG for Tea Garden (town/village), TE for Tea Estate
Owing to space constraints in the small map, the actual locations in a larger map may vary slightly

=== Location ===
Tonglu is located at 27.03°N 88.09°E.

=== Area overview ===
The map alongside shows the northern portion of the Darjeeling Himalayan hill region. Kangchenjunga, which rises with an elevation of 8,586 metres (28,169 ft) is located further north of the area shown.Sandakphu, rising to a height of 3,636 metres (11,929 ft), on the Singalila Ridge, is the highest point in West Bengal. In Darjeeling Sadar subdivision 61% of the total population lives in the rural areas and 39% of the population lives in the urban areas. There are 78 tea gardens/ estates (the figure varies slightly according to different sources), producing and largely exporting Darjeeling tea in the district. It engages a large proportion of the population directly/ indirectly. Some tea gardens were identified in the 2011 census as census towns or villages. Such places are marked in the map as CT (census town) or R (rural/ urban centre). Specific tea estate pages are marked TE.

Note: The map alongside presents some of the notable locations in the subdivision. All places marked in the map are linked in the larger full screen map.

== Gallery ==
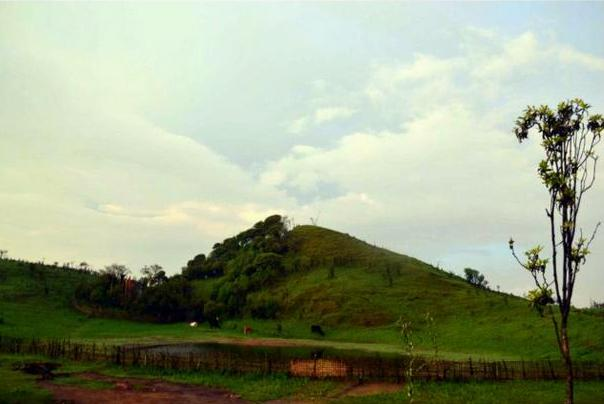
After rain, Tonglu looks fresh.

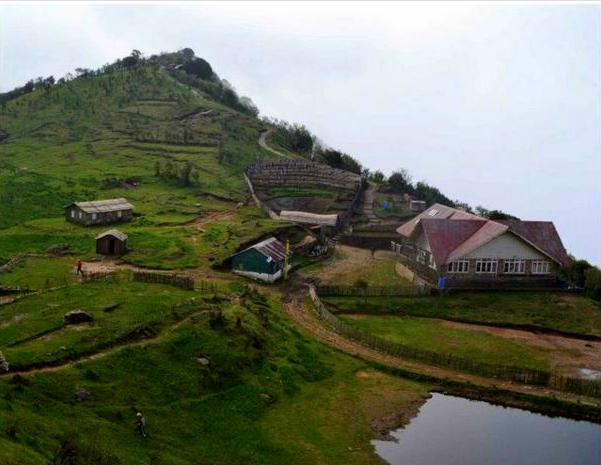
Tonglu
