= Lloyd's Botanical Garden =

Botanical garden in Darjeeling in the Indian state of West Bengal

Coordinates: 27.0446°N 88.2629°E

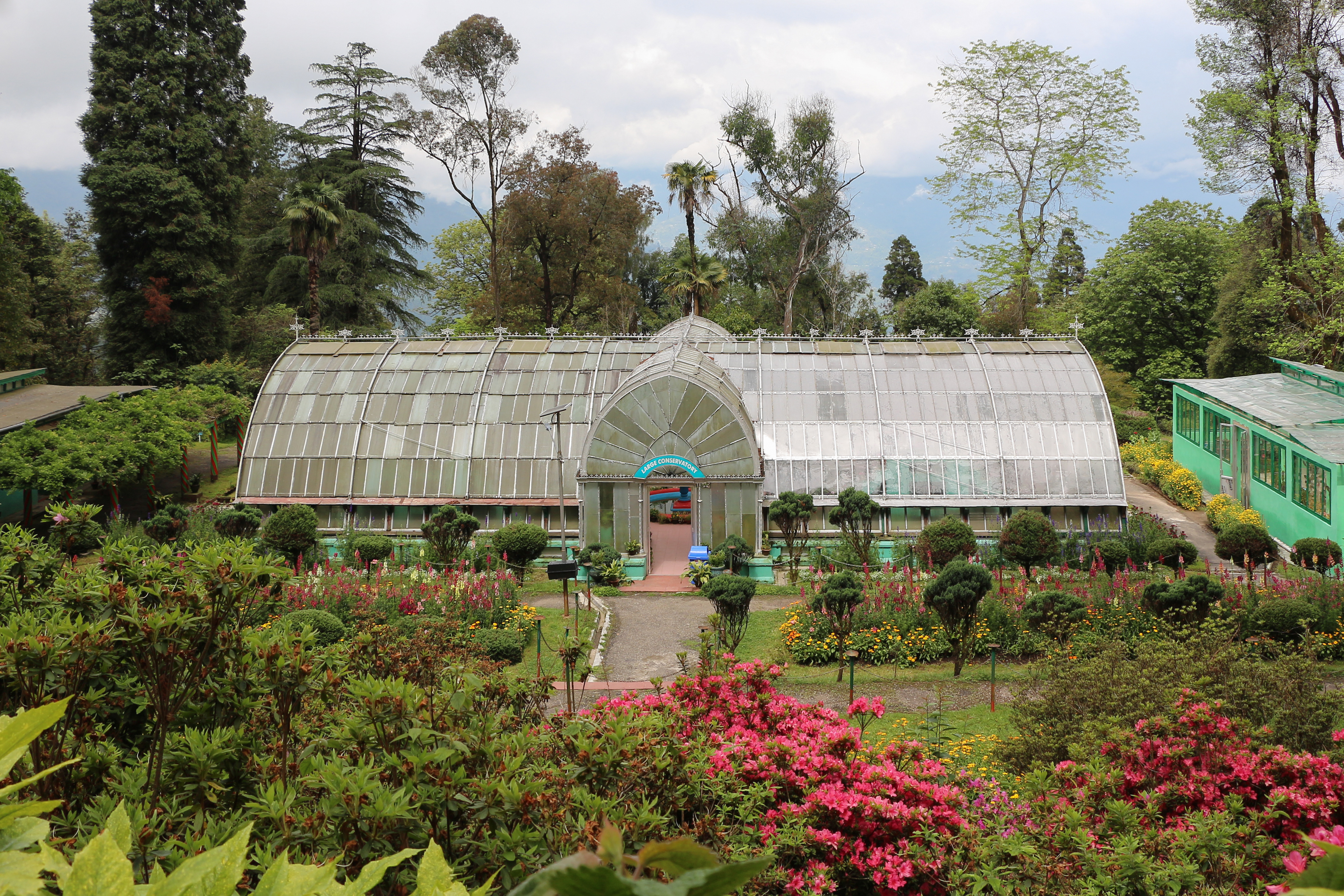
- Interactive map of Lloyd's Botanical Garden
- Location: Darjeeling, India
- Area: 16 hectares (40 acres)
- Created: 1878; 148 years ago

Lloyd's Botanical Garden, or Darjeeling Botanical Garden, is a botanical garden in Darjeeling in the Indian state of West Bengal.

== History ==
Lloyd's Botanical Garden was established in 1878 when 40 acres (160,000 m^{2}) of land was acquired at Darjeeling to form a botanic garden as a distant annexe of the Calcutta Botanical Garden. The land was provided by William Lloyd, in whose name the botanical garden has been named.

== Location ==
The Garden is situated just below the Eden Sanatorium in an open slope covering an area of about 16 hectares (40 acres), bound by Cart Road and Victoria Road on the North, by Jail Road and Hari Ghose Road on the south, by Eden sanatorium on the east and Victoria Road on the west. This Garden is one of the main attractions to the visitors to Darjeeling with a treasury of many rare and beautiful plants as well as patches of typical forest of tall Cryptomeria, Bucklandia and Alnus with thick mass of lianas and shrubby undergrowth. It is a favorite spot of recreation with vistas across some of the loveliest slopes, a paradise to the students and research workers in Botany and an eminent institution distributing the plants and seeds and specimens of temperate and sub-temperate Himalayas to different parts of the world.

== Approach ==
The botanical garden has four gates. Gate No:1 ( Iron Gate or Loachnagar gate) is approachable from the taxi stand. The road is very steep but shorter than the other approaches. Vehicles can reach this gate, but there is no parking facility. Gate No:2 (Staff gate) can be approached from the Sadar Police Station. This path is through the settlements and is narrow and can be reached on foot only. The road will lead to the staff quarters and a flight of stairs will lead to Gate No:2.Approaching Gate No:2 on foot is comparatively easier than reaching other gates on foot. Gate No:3 (Chandmari gate) can be reached through Haro Ghose road which passes through the bazaar. Vehicles can reach this gate, but no parking is available. Gate No:4 (Victoria gate) is on the Victoria road and provides entry for visitors entering from the Western side.

== Collections ==
The Darjeeling Botanical Garden preserves several species of bamboo, oak, magnolia, arisaema, cotoneaster, wild geranium, and rhododendron — forest native plants of the Darjeeling Himalayan hill region, Sikkim region, and other neighbouring regions. Also, several exotic plants are preserved. The Cacti and Succulent collection of 150 species is displayed in the Conservatory. The collection of native Orchids from the Singalila Ridge in present-day Singalila National Park is rare and notable.

The Indian Botanical Garden Network's Garden code ascribed for this garden is WB-DBG.

== Orchids ==
Flowering Calendar of Orchids in Lloyd Botanical Garden
Sl. No.	MARCH – APRIL	Sl. No.	JUNE – JULY
1	Calanthe puberula Lindl.	1	Agrostophyllum callosum Rchb.f.
2	Coelogyne flaccida Lindl.	2	Bulbophyllum leopardinum (Wall.) Lindl.
3	Coelogyne corymbosa Lindl.	3	Cryptochilus lutea Lindl.
4	Coelogyne cristata Lindl.	4	Dendrobium gibsonii Lindl.
5	Dendrobium nobile var. alba Lindl.	5	Liparis pusilla Ridl.
6	Dendrobium nobile var. pendulum Lindl.	6	Liparis resupinata Ridl.
7	Dendrobium nobile var. virginalis Lindl.	7	Spiranthes sinensis (Pers.) Ames.
8	Eria confusa Hook.f.		JUNE – AUGUST
9	Eria convallarioides Lindl.	1	Paphiopedilum hirsutissimum Pfitz.
10	Goodyera foliosa (Lindl.) Benth. ex C.B. Clarke		JULY – AUGUST
11	Habenaria sp.	1	Sarcanthus pallidus Lindl.
12	Renanthera imschootiana Rolfe		AUGUST – SEPTEMBER
13	Vanda cristata var. multiflora Hort.	1	Anthogonium gracile Lindl.
	MARCH – MAY	2	Bulbophyllum cariniflorum Rchb.f.
1	Papilionanthe vandarum Rchb.f.	3	Calanthe masuca (D.Don)Lindl.
2	Cymbidium eburneum Lindl.	4	Dendrobium chrysanthum Wall.ex Lindl.
3	Dendrobium longicornu Lindl.	5	Dendrobium hookerianum Lindl.
4	Epigenium rotundatum (Lindl.)Summ.	6	Eria acervata Lindl.
5	Phaius maculates Lindl.	7	Sobralia amesiana Sander
6	Saturopsis undulatus Benth.	8	Thunia venosum Rolfe.
7	Coelogyne flavida Wall. ex Lindl.		SEPTEMBER – OCTOBER
8	Dendrobium falconeri Hook.	1	Coelogyne barbata Lindl. ex Griff.
9	Dendrobium nobile Lindl.	2	Coelogyne occultata Hook.f.
10	Doritis taenialis (Lindl.) Hook.f.	3	Cymbidium mastersii Griff. ex Lindl.
11	Phaius wallichii Lindl.		SEPTEMBER – NOVEMBER
12	Trudelia cristata (Lindl.) Senghas	1	Cymbidium affine Warn.
	MARCH – JUNE	2	Cymbidium cochleare Lindl.
1	Masdevallia harrisonii	3	Cymbidium elegans Lindl.
	MARCH – NOVEMBER	4	Cymbidium gammieanum Rolfe.
1	Eria coronaria (Lindl.) Rchb.f.	5	Cymbidium giganteum Wall. ex Lindl.
2	Eria stricta Lindl.	6	Cymbidium longifolium D.Don
	APRIL – MAY	7	Epigenium amplum (Lindl.)Summ.
1	Calanthe chloroleuca Lindl.	8	Oberonia iridifolia Lindl.
2	Coelogyne elata Lindl.	9	Vanda coerulea Griff. ex.Lindl.
3	Dendrobium densiflorum Lindl.ex Wall.		OCTOBER – DECEMBER
	APRIL – JUNE	1	Cymbidium tracyanum Rolfe.
1	Aerides biswasiana Mukherjee & Ghose	2	Pleione praecox (J.E.Smith) D. Don
2	Cymbidium devonianum Lindl. ex Paxton		OCTOBER - JANUARY
3	Cymbidium lowianum Rchb.f.	1	Paphiopedilium insigne Pfitz.
	MAY – JUNE		NOVEMBER – DECEMBER
1	Coelogyne ochracea Lindl.	1	Otochilus albus Lindl.
2	Coelogyne prolifera Lindl.	2	Otochilus fuscus Lindl.
3	Dendrobium brymerianum Rchb.f.		NOVEMBER – JANUARY
4	Thunia alba (Lindl.) Rchb.f.	1	Paphiopedilum villosum Lindl.
	JUNE		NOVEMBER – FEBRUARY
1	Pholidota imbricata Hook.	1	Paphiopedilum villosum var. boxallii (Rchb.f.) Pfitzer
			DECEMBER – FEBRUARY
		1	Cymbidium grandiflorum Griff.

== See also ==
- List of botanical gardens
- Padmaja Naidu Himalayan Zoological Park
- Rock Garden, Darjeeling
- Singalila National Park
