= Petr Švácha =

Petr Švácha is a Czech entomologist with the Academy of Sciences of the Czech Republic. In 2008, Švácha was arrested by Indian authorities for collecting insect specimens in Singalila National Park without proper permits. A group of Indian scientists responded by launching a petition in their support which ultimately gathered more than 1,200 signatures from leading entomologists worldwide. However, Švácha was fined, while his assistant Emil Kučera was sentenced to three years imprisonment but fled home to the Czech Republic prior to sentencing. Their conviction was the first under India's Biological Diversity Act of 2002.

Švácha is editor-in-chief of the European Journal of Entomology.
