= Rimbick =

- Village
- Location in West Bengal, India Rimbick (India)
- Coordinates: 27.1221°N 88.1071°E
- Country: India
- State: West Bengal
- District: Darjeeling
- Elevation: 2,286 m (7,500 ft)

Population (2011)
  - Total: 2,752
- Time zone: UTC+5:30 (IST)
- PIN: 734201
- Telephone/STD code: 0353
- Lok Sabha constituency: Darjeeling
- Vidhan Sabha constituency: Darjeeling
- Website: darjeeling.gov.in

Rimbick is a village in the Darjeeling Pulbazar CD block in the Darjeeling Sadar subdivision of the Darjeeling district in West Bengal, India.

== Geography ==
Places and tea estates in the north-western portion of Darjeeling Sadar subdivision (including Darjeeling Pulbazar CD block) in Darjeeling district
CT: census town, R: rural/ urban centre, N: neighbourhood, H: hill centre, NP: national park/ wildlife sanctuary, TE: tea estate, TA: tourist attraction
Abbreviations used in names – TG for Tea Garden (town/village), TE for Tea Estate
Owing to space constraints in the small map, the actual locations in a larger map may vary slightly

=== Location ===
Rimbick is located at 27.1221°N 88.1071°E.

Rimbick is a village near the India-Nepal border. It is 56 km away from Darjeeling town. It is known for its scenery. Many trekkers take the jeep to Darjeeling town from here as its readily available.

There are places like Guffa, Jarayo Pokhari, Namla falls and Hospital Dara View Point for tourist to visit. The Tuesday bazaar is an attraction there.

=== Area overview ===
The map alongside shows the northern portion of the Darjeeling Himalayan hill region. Kangchenjunga, which rises with an elevation of 8,586 metres (28,169 ft) is located further north of the area shown.Sandakphu, rising to a height of 3,665 metres (12,024 ft), on the Singalila Ridge, is the highest point in West Bengal. In Darjeeling Sadar subdivision 61% of the total population lives in the rural areas and 39% of the population lives in the urban areas. There are 78 tea gardens or estates (the figure varies slightly according to different sources), producing and largely exporting Darjeeling tea in the district. It engages a large proportion of the population directly/ indirectly. Some tea gardens were identified in the 2011 census as census towns or villages. Such places are marked in the map as CT (census town) or R (rural/ urban centre). Specific tea estate pages are marked TE.

Note: The map alongside presents some of the notable locations in the subdivision. All places marked in the map are linked in the larger full screen map.

== Demographics ==
According to the 2011 Census of India, Rimbick had a total population of 6,980 of which 3,544 (51%) were males and 3,436 (49%) were females. There were 659 persons in the age range of 0 to 6 years. The total number of literate people in Rimbick was 5,137 (75.60% of the population over 6 years).

== Education ==
Rimbik Higher Secondary School is an English-medium coeducational institution established in 1948. It has facilities for teaching from class V to class XII. It has 5 computers and a playground.
