= Singalila National Park =

National park of India on the Singalila Ridge in Darjeeling district, West Bengal

- IUCN category II (national park)
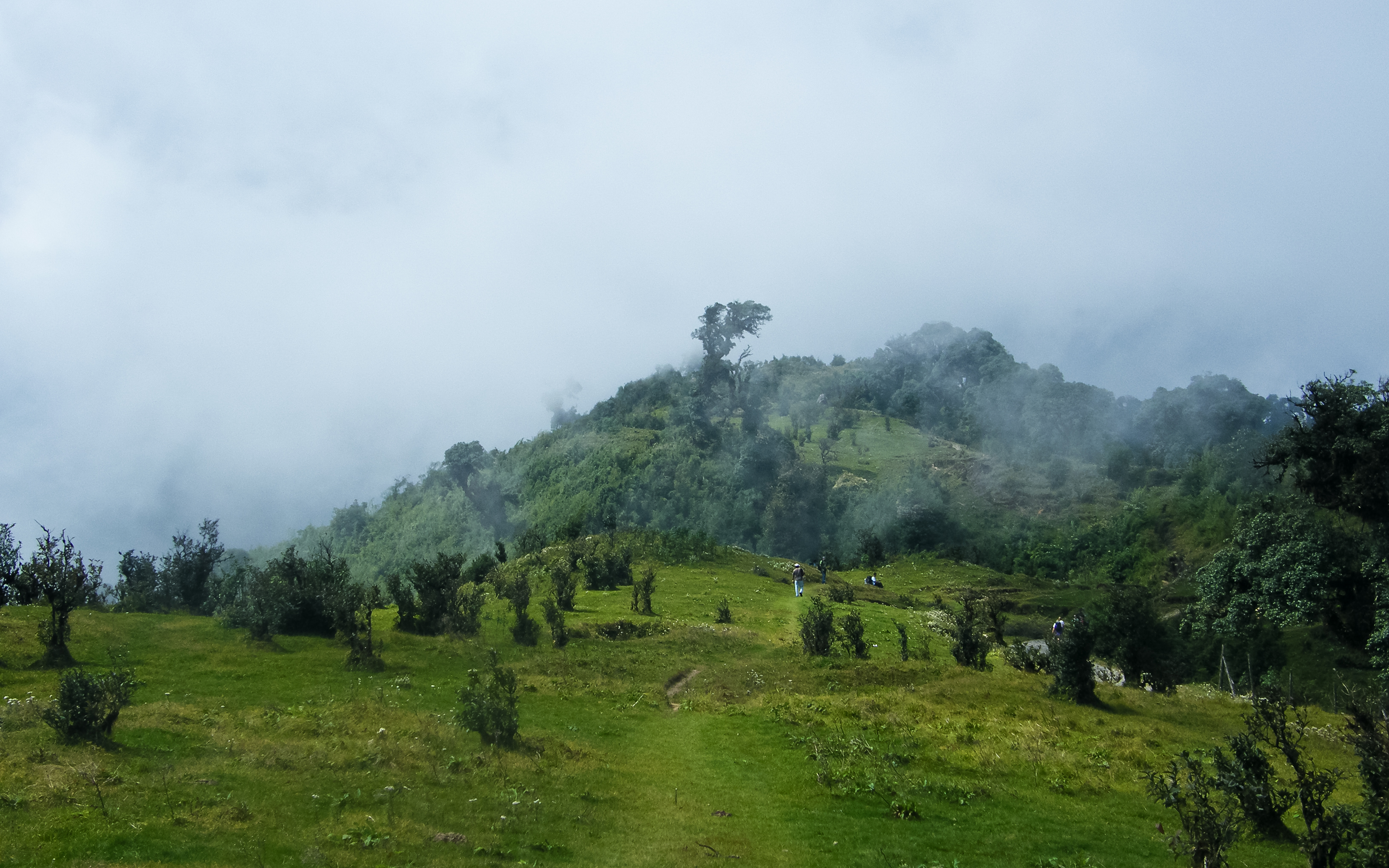

- Location within West Bengal Location within India Location within Asia
- Interactive map of Singalila National Park
- Location: Darjeeling, West Bengal, India
- Nearest city: Manebhanjan
- Coordinates: 27°07′N 88°04′E
- Area: 78.6
- Established: 1986; 40 years ago
- Governing body: Government of India, Government of West Bengal

Singalila National Park is a national park of India located on the Singalila Ridge at an elevation of more than 2,300 metres above sea level, in the Darjeeling district of West Bengal. It is well known for the trekking route to Sandakphu that runs through it.

== History ==
The region had long been used as the trekking route from Manebhanjang to Sandakphu (the highest peak of West Bengal) and Phalut. The Singalila area in Darjeeling was purchased by the British Government from Sikkim Durbar in 1882, and notified a Reserve Forest under the Indian Forest Act 1878.

One of the greatest British botanists and explorers Joseph Dalton Hooker visited Singalila Ridge in 1849. Hooker's expedition was based in Darjeeling where he stayed with naturalist Brian Houghton Hodgson. Through Hodgson he met British East India Company representative Archibald Campbell who negotiated Hooker's admission to Sikkim, which was finally approved in 1849. Hooker explored with local resident Charles Barnes, then travelled along the Rangeet River to its junction with the Teesta River and Tonglu mountain in the Singalila Ridge on the border with Nepal.

The park was declared a wildlife sanctuary in 1986, and was made an Indian national park in 1992.

== Geography ==
Singalila National Park is located on the Singalila Ridge at an elevation of 2300 metres to 4000 metres above sea level with an area of 78.6 square kilometers.

Places and tea estates in the northern portion of Darjeeling Sadar subdivision (including Darjeeling Pulbazar and Rangli Rangliot CD blocks) in Darjeeling district
CT: census town, R: rural/ urban centre, N: neighbourhood, H: hill centre, NP: national park/ wildlife sanctuary, TE: tea estate, TA: tourist attraction
Abbreviations used in names – TG for Tea Garden (town/village), TE for Tea Estate
Owing to space constraints in the small map, the actual locations in a larger map may vary slightly

Political geography: The park is located in the Darjeeling subdivision, Darjeeling district, West Bengal, India. It is bordered on the north by the state of Sikkim and on the west by the country of Nepal.

Physical geography: The park is part of the Eastern Himalayas. The Singalila Ridge, which runs roughly North to South and separates Himalayan West Bengal from the other Eastern Himalayan ranges to the west of it. The two highest peaks of West Bengal, Sandakphu (3630 m) and Phalut (3600 m), are located on the ridge and inside the park. Rammam River and Srikhola River flow through the park.

Note: The map alongside presents some of the notable locations in the subdivision. All places marked in the map are linked in the larger full screen map.

== Human history ==
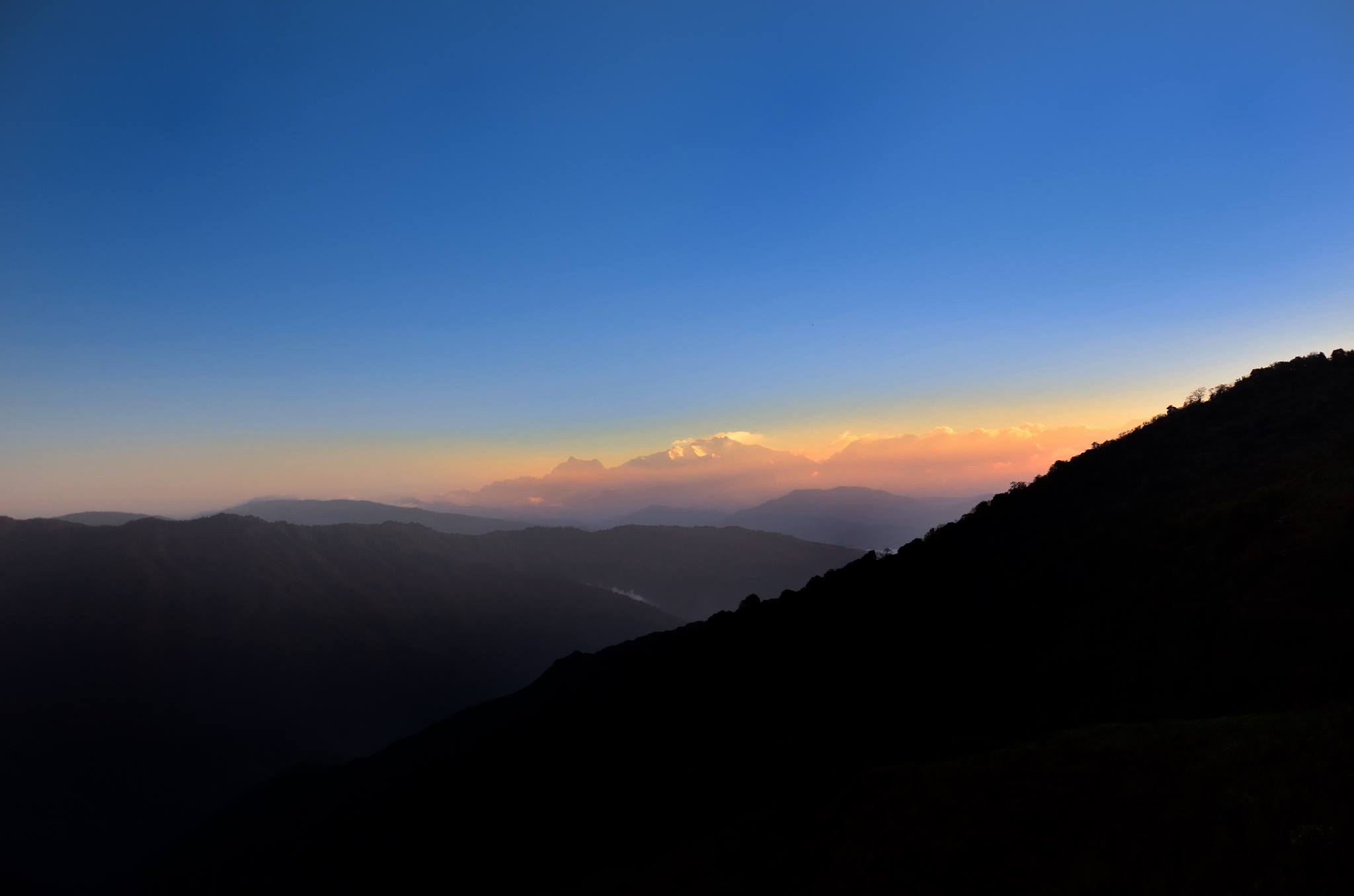
Kanchenjunga range from Sandakphu

The park has no significant history of human settlement. However, small settlements have grown up along the trekking route to Sandakphu and Phalut. There is a reasonably large village at Kala Pokhri, around the lake of the same name. The Singalila Ridge was used as an approach route by the first documented mountaineering team which unsuccessfully attempted to climb Kanchenjunga in 1905. The team was led by Jules Jacot-Guillarmod and the famous occultist Aleister Crowley.

== Natural history ==
=== Biomes ===
Because of the park's range in elevation, it includes three separate biomes, ranging from subalpine to subtropical, and three corresponding ecoregions:

- The Eastern Himalayan subalpine conifer forests ecoregion, of the temperate coniferous forests biome
- Eastern Himalayan broadleaf forests ecoregion, of the temperate broadleaf and mixed forests biome
- Himalayan subtropical pine forests ecoregion, of the subtropical coniferous forest biome

The subtropical biome roughly exists in the elevation range of 1800 to 3000 m, and the temperate biome exists in the elevation range of 3000 m to 4500 m.

== Biodiversity ==
=== Flora ===
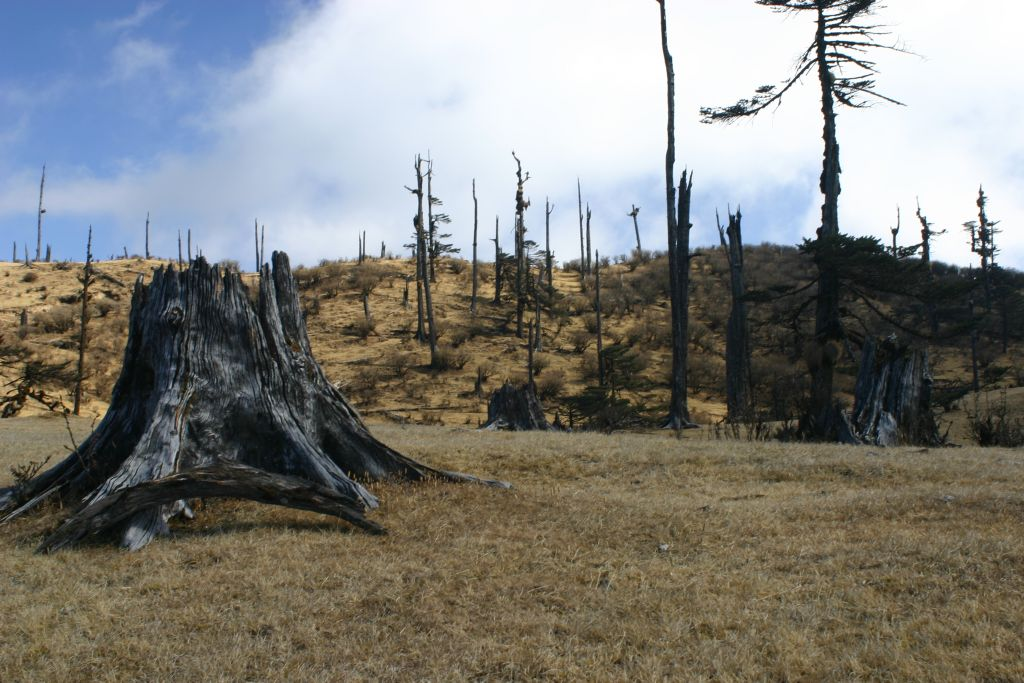
Typical high elevation vegetation along the trek route from Sandakphu to Phalut

Thick bamboo, oak, magnolia and rhododendron forest between 2000 and 3600 m cover the Singalila Ridge. There are two seasons of wildflower bloom - one in spring (March and April) when the rhododendrons bloom, and another in the post-monsoon season (around October), when the lower forests bloom (Primula, Geranium, Saxifraga, Bistort, Senecio, Cotoneaster and numerous orchids).

Sandakphu is known as the "mountain of poisonous plants" due to the large concentration of Himalayan cobra lilies (Arisaema) which grow there. The plant life has been surveyed in 2001.

The orchidarium of Lloyd Botanical Garden at Darjeeling houses as many as 2,500 orchids, which include 50 rare varieties. Most of these have been brought here from Singalila National Park.

Flowering Calendar of Orchids in Lloyd Botanical Garden
| Sl. No. | MARCH – APRIL | Sl. No. | JUNE – JULY |
| 1 | Calanthe puberula Lindl. | 1 | Agrostophyllum callosum Rchb.f. |
| 2 | Coelogyne flaccida Lindl. | 2 | Bulbophyllum leopardinum (Wall.) Lindl. |
| 3 | Coelogyne corymbosa Lindl. | 3 | Cryptochilus lutea Lindl. |
| 4 | Coelogyne cristata Lindl. | 4 | Dendrobium gibsonii Lindl. |
| 5 | Dendrobium nobile var. alba Lindl. | 5 | Liparis pusilla Ridl. |
| 6 | Dendrobium nobile var. pendulum Lindl. | 6 | Liparis resupinata Ridl. |
| 7 | Dendrobium nobile var. virginalis Lindl. | 7 | Spiranthes sinensis (Pers.) Ames. |
| 8 | Eria confusa Hook.f. | | JUNE – AUGUST |
| 9 | Eria convallarioides Lindl. | 1 | Paphiopedilum hirsutissimum Pfitz. |
| 10 | Goodyera foliosa (Lindl.) Benth. ex C.B. Clarke | | JULY – AUGUST |
| 11 | Habenaria sp. | 1 | Sarcanthus pallidus Lindl. |
| 12 | Renanthera imschootiana Rolfe | | AUGUST – SEPTEMBER |
| 13 | Vanda cristata var. multiflora Hort. | 1 | Anthogonium gracile Lindl. |
| | MARCH – MAY | 2 | Bulbophyllum cariniflorum Rchb.f. |
| 1 | Papilionanthe vandarum Rchb.f. | 3 | Calanthe masuca (D.Don)Lindl. |
| 2 | Cymbidium eburneum Lindl. | 4 | Dendrobium chrysanthum Wall.ex Lindl. |
| 3 | Dendrobium longicornu Lindl. | 5 | Dendrobium hookerianum Lindl. |
| 4 | Epigenium rotundatum (Lindl.)Summ. | 6 | Eria acervata Lindl. |
| 5 | Phaius maculates Lindl. | 7 | Sobralia amesiana Sander |
| 6 | Saturopsis undulatus Benth. | 8 | Thunia venosum Rolfe. |
| 7 | Coelogyne flavida Wall. ex Lindl. | | SEPTEMBER – OCTOBER |
| 8 | Dendrobium falconeri Hook. | 1 | Coelogyne barbata Lindl. ex Griff. |
| 9 | Dendrobium nobile Lindl. | 2 | Coelogyne occultata Hook.f. |
| 10 | Doritis taenialis (Lindl.) Hook.f. | 3 | Cymbidium mastersii Griff. ex Lindl. |
| 11 | Phaius wallichii Lindl. | | SEPTEMBER – NOVEMBER |
| 12 | Trudelia cristata (Lindl.) Senghas | 1 | Cymbidium affine Warn. |
| | MARCH – JUNE | 2 | Cymbidium cochleare Lindl. |
| 1 | Masdevallia harrisonii | 3 | Cymbidium elegans Lindl. |
| | MARCH – NOVEMBER | 4 | Cymbidium gammieanum Rolfe. |
| 1 | Eria coronaria (Lindl.) Rchb.f. | 5 | Cymbidium giganteum Wall. ex Lindl. |
| 2 | Eria stricta Lindl. | 6 | Cymbidium longifolium D.Don |
| | APRIL – MAY | 7 | Epigenium amplum (Lindl.)Summ. |
| 1 | Calanthe chloroleuca Lindl. | 8 | Oberonia iridifolia Lindl. |
| 2 | Coelogyne elata Lindl. | 9 | Vanda coerulea Griff. ex.Lindl. |
| 3 | Dendrobium densiflorum Lindl.ex Wall. | | OCTOBER – DECEMBER |
| | APRIL – JUNE | 1 | Cymbidium tracyanum Rolfe. |
| 1 | Aerides biswasiana Mukherjee & Ghose | 2 | Pleione praecox (J.E.Smith) D. Don |
| 2 | Cymbidium devonianum Lindl. ex Paxton | | OCTOBER - JANUARY |
| 3 | Cymbidium lowianum Rchb.f. | 1 | Paphiopedilium insigne Pfitz. |
| | MAY – JUNE | | NOVEMBER – DECEMBER |
| 1 | Coelogyne ochracea Lindl. | 1 | Otochilus albus Lindl. |
| 2 | Coelogyne prolifera Lindl. | 2 | Otochilus fuscus Lindl. |
| 3 | Dendrobium brymerianum Rchb.f. | | NOVEMBER – JANUARY |
| 4 | Thunia alba (Lindl.) Rchb.f. | 1 | Paphiopedilum villosum Lindl. |
| | JUNE | | NOVEMBER – FEBRUARY |
| 1 | Pholidota imbricata Hook. | 1 | Paphiopedilum villosum var. boxallii (Rchb.f.) Pfitzer |
| | | | DECEMBER – FEBRUARY |
| | | 1 | Cymbidium grandiflorum Griff. |

=== Fauna ===
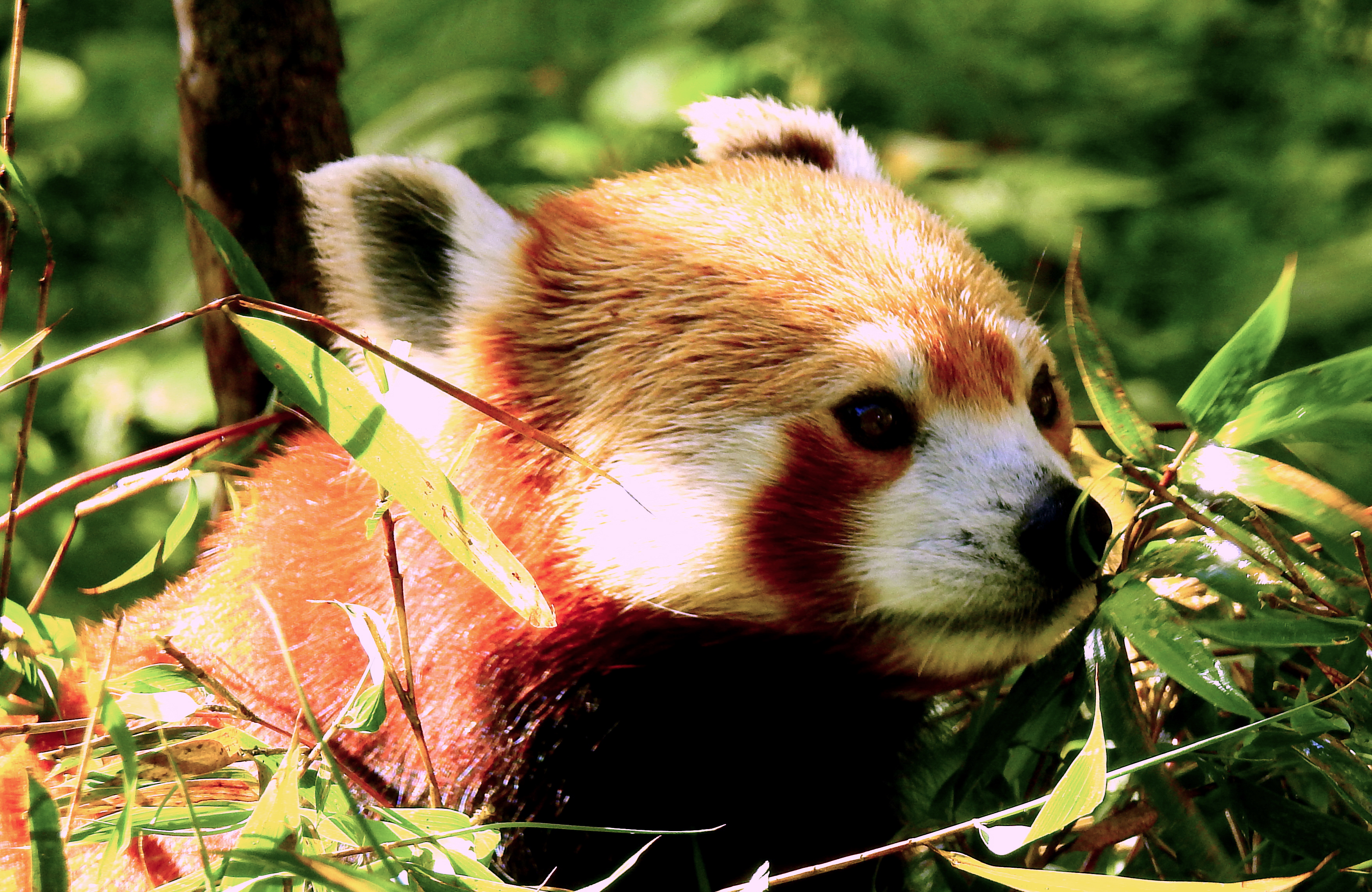
Red Panda at Singalila National Park

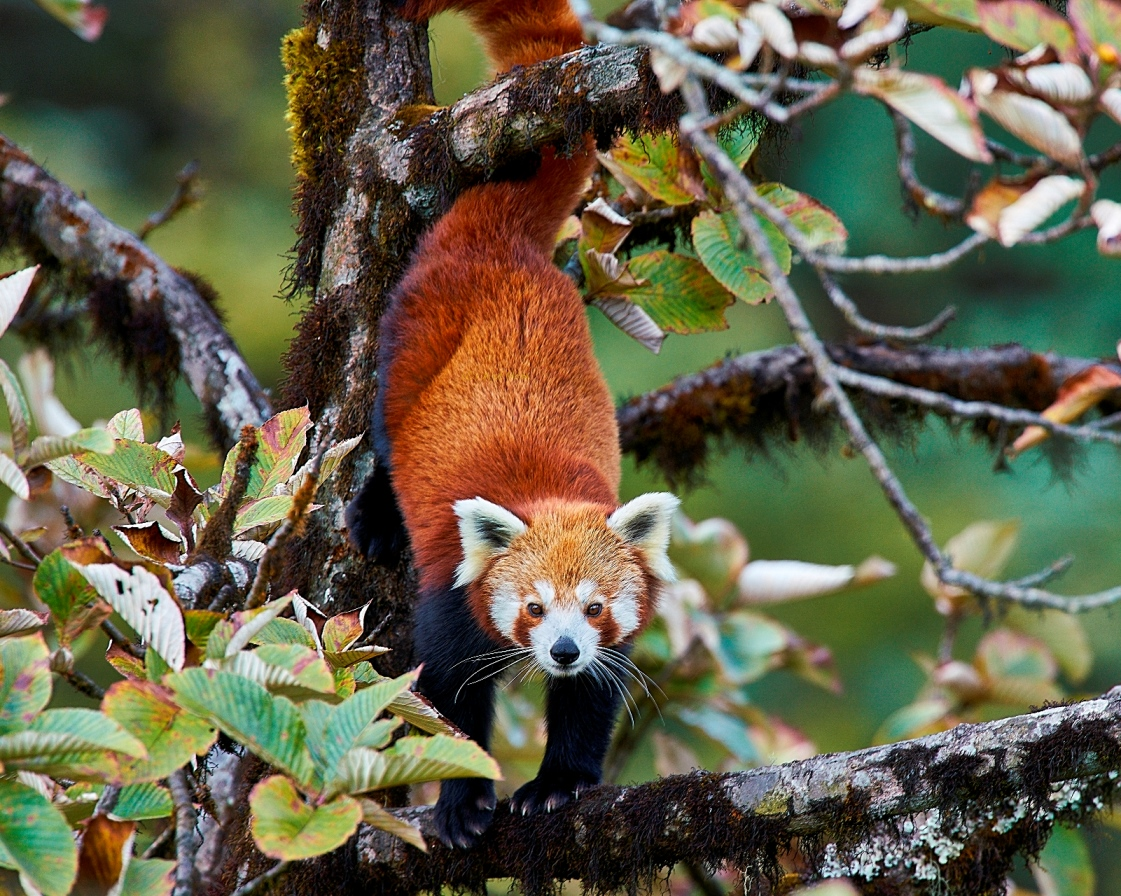
Red Panda from Singalila National Park

Mammals: The park has a number of small mammals including the red panda, leopard cat, barking deer, yellow-throated marten, wild boar, pangolin and pika. Larger mammals include the Himalayan black bear, leopard, clouded leopard, serow and takin. Tigers occasionally wander into the area, but do not have a large enough prey base to make residence in these forests feasible.

Birds: The park is home to over 120 species of birds including many rare and exotic species like the Himalayan Vulture, scarlet minivet, kalij pheasant, blood pheasant, satyr tragopan, brown and fulvous parrotbills, rufous-vented tit, and Old World babblers like the fire-tailed myzornis and the golden-breasted fulvetta. The park is also on the flyway of many migratory birds.

Reptiles and amphibians: The endangered Himalayan newt frequents the region and congregates around the lakes of Jore Pokhri and Sukhiapokhri and nearby lakes to reproduce. Jore Pokhri and Sukhiapokhri are within 20 km of the park boundary and are protected wildlife sanctuaries.

== Conservation issues ==
The major issues at the park are trash collection on trekking routes and ensuring minimal damage of flora by trekkers, as flora at such high elevations tend to grow really slowly. Grazing of yak and cattle from neighbouring villages can also be a problem. Forest fires can be a threat to the park, especially in spring when the accumulated debris from winter can be a hazard. A forest fire swept through the park on 6 March 2006.

Even though the national park has a resident red panda population of only about 42 (in 2019) members, Project Red Panda (funded by the Central Zoo Authority) chose Singalila National Park for reintroduction of red pandas from its captive breeding program at the Padmaja Naidu Himalayan Zoological Park in Darjeeling, mainly due to reasons of proximity. Two females, Sweety and Milli, were released in November 2004. Milli was killed by a leopard, but Sweety adapted to the wild and gave birth to an offspring - the first such successful re-entry for red panda.

The reintroduction was filmed by noted Indian filmmakers Rajesh Bedi and Naresh Bedi. The documentary, named Cherub of the Mist, won the Best Conservation and Environmental Film at the 29th International Wildlife Film Festival in Montana.

== Park-specific information ==
The park is one of the most popular family camping destinations in the Eastern Himalayas. The two seasons to visit the park are in spring (March–May) and post monsoon (mid-September to early December). The park is closed to tourists from 16 June to 15 September every year on account of the monsoons.

=== Activities ===
Trekking and camping : The trek along the Singalila Ridge to Sandakphu and Phalut is one of the most popular ones in the Eastern Himalayas, due to the grand vistas of the Kangchenjunga range, and the Everest range which can be seen from the ridge, and also for the seasonal wildflower blooms and birding. Treks begin at Manebhanjan which is 51 km (1.5 hours by road) from Darjeeling. The trekking routes inside the national park have 4 legs or stages.

A schematic of trekking trails in the national park

- Manebhanjan to Meghma (2600 m): This is a 4-hour trek through the lower forest
- Meghma to Gairibans (2621 m): There are two alternative trekking routes. Both go via Tonglu (3070 m) and Tumling (2900 m). The boundary of the national park passes through Tomling and a checkpost is located there. From Tumling, a shorter trail cuts through Nepal and Jaubari (2750 m).
- Gairibans to Sandakphu (3636 m): This is a steep 4 hour climb up. Roughly halfway up the climb is the village of Kala Pokhri (3186 m).
- Sandakphu to Phalut (3600 m): This is the most pristine stretch of the trek, offering great views of Kanchenjunga and Mt. Everest. It is a one-day trek via Sabarkum (3536 m) covering 21 km. But the main problem of this Sandakphu-Phalut route is there is no water source in between so the trekker has to carry enough water to reach Phalut.

The descent from Sandakphu can be accomplished in several ways:

- Retracing the way back to Manebhanjan.
- A steep descent to the village of Sirikhola on the banks of the River Sirikhola, via Gurdum (2300 m), and from there to Rimbik.
- There is now a 4WD motorable road to Sandakphu, so one can hire a cab down to Manebhanjan and Darjeeling via Tomling and Tonglu if needed. Concrete roads are made recently. Earlier roads were made with gravel.

The descent from Phalut can also be accomplished in several ways:

- Retracing the way back to Manebhanjan.
- A descent down to Sirikhola along high elevation meadows which have seasonal blooms. The descent is via Sabarkum and the abandoned village of Molley. A further trek leads one to the scenic village of Rimbik, which is motorable.
- The most popular descent is via the villages of Gorkey (on the banks of the River Rammam) and Samanden down to the village of Rammam. The trail then leads to Rimbik, and is shorter than the route via Sirikhola.

Birding: The Singalila National Park is one of the most popular birding spots in the Eastern Himalayas, since it attracts a large number of birds due to its seasonal blooms. Blooming seasons are the best times to see birds.

=== Overnight ===
There are two roomed guest houses and trekkers' huts at Tonglu, Gairibans, Sandakphu, Phalut, Kala Pokhri and several other locations in the park, run by the Darjeeling Gorkha Hill Council. Numerous guest houses and lodging are available at Manebhanjan. The preferred way to visit the park is to stay in Darjeeling and camp inside the national park.

=== Approach ===
- Nearest airport:
  - Bagdogra Airport, West Bengal
  - Gangtok Helipad, East Sikkim district, Sikkim
- Nearest railhead:
  - Narrow gauge: Ghum, West Bengal
  - Standard Gauge: New Jalpaiguri, West Bengal
- Nearest highway: NH 31A (Sivok-Gangtok) passes through Darjeeling (which is 1.5 hours by car from Manebhanjan)
- Nearest town: Manebhanjan - the access point for Rimbick and Tumling, the gateways to the park
- Nearest city: Darjeeling

== How to reach ==
By road: Singalila National Park is well connected by road. But the roads are circular and the journey can feel like wave motion.
The road route from Siliguri
Siliguri > Sukna > Rangtong > Kurseong> Tung > Sonada> Ghoom> Manebhanjan > Tonglu - 90 km.

By rail: The nearest railway station is Ghoom Railway Station 31 km from Tonglu (entry point to the Singalila National Park).

By air: Singalila National Park is located 13 km from Bagdogra Airport in Bagdogra. That is the nearest airport, but by road it is less than 100 km and takes 3 to 4 hours.

== Films ==
- Singalila in the Himalaya by George Thengummoottil http://theindia.info/SingaliLaInTheHimalaya Film speaks about the history of Singalila ridge through a 14-day trek.
