= Madan Tamang =

Indian politician

Madan Tamang (मदन तामाङ)

President, Akhil Bharatiya Gorkha League

Personal details
- Born: 1 June 1948
- Died: 21 May 2010 (aged 61) Darjeeling, West Bengal, India
- Cause of death: Assassination

Madan Tamang was an Indian politician and the president of Akhil Bharatiya Gorkha League (ABGL), a moderate faction of the Gorkhaland movement. Opposed to violent methods for the process, he stood for a negotiated settlement to the Gorkhaland dispute. He was hacked to death allegedly by Gorkha Janmukti Morcha supporters on 21 May 2010 which led to spontaneous shutdown in the three divisions of the hills Darjeeling, Kurseong and Kalimpong.

== Personal life ==
Madan Tamang was born on 1 June 1948 to Nepali parents Manbahadur Tamang and Lamu Tamang at Meghma village in Darjeeling district. He was the eldest of four brothers. He studied at St Robert's School in Darjeeling and then completed his Bachelor's degree in humanities from St Joseph's College at North Point in Darjeeling. He was married to Bharati Tamang. Madan Tamang entered the tea business by establishing a tea estate on his ancestral land around Meghma on the Indo-Nepal border.

== Political career ==
Madan Tamang entered into politics in 1969 while still in college when he became a close associate of the noted ABGL leader of the time, Deo Prakash Rai. Through the 1970s, he headed Tarun Gorkha, the youth wing of the Akhil Bharatiya Gorkha League (ABGL), and became well known for his oratory skills. Eventually, he became the District Secretary of the Gorkha League in 1977, though he resigned in 1980 to join a new outfit, Pranta Parishad, where he worked closely with Subhash Ghisingh for some time till Ghisingh started the Gorkha National Liberation Front (GNLF) in 1980 and demanded the state of Gorkhaland. Meanwhile, the Pranta Parishad along with organizations like the Nepali Bhasa Manyata Samiti started a campaign to include the Nepali language in the Eighth Schedule of the Constitution, and also turned an important rival of Ghisingh.

Tamang refused to join GNLF during the Gorkhaland agitation of 1986–1988 and even criticized both the organization and the movement itself.

Between 1986 and 1988, he openly criticized Ghisingh for corruption and use of violence. According to contemporary reports, his ancestral house at Meghma near Sandakphu was later burnt by GNLF supporters.

In 1992, Tamang formed the Gorkha Democratic Front (GDF), which rejected the GNLF's call for replacing the term "Nepali" by "Gorkhali" in the constitutional recognition of the language. His support for the recognition of the language as Nepali continued, and he rejoined the ABGL in 2004. In 2001, the GDF merged with ABGL, and Madan Tamang became the president of ABGL.

Tamang was also against the move to include the Darjeeling Hills under the Sixth Schedule of the Constitution, and he led the People's Democratic Front, an alliance of political parties opposing the move.

After the downfall of Subhash Ghisingh and GNLF and the rise of a new party Gorkha Janmukti Morcha (GJM) headed by Bimal Gurung in the Darjeeling hills, Madan Tamang became a vocal opponent of the GJM and levelled corruption charges against Bimal Gurung and other GJM leaders. ABGL set up an alliance of eight parties called Democratic Front along with Bharatiya Janata Party (BJP) and Communist Party of Revolutionary Marxists (CPRM) to fight for democracy in the hills through peaceful means and to oppose the GJM from accepting a compromised interim setup in place of a full-fledged state, as originally demanded by the Gorkhaland movement and GJM leaders.

After the formation of GJM in 2007, Tamang first supported the party, but soon developed criticism of its leadership, claiming that it had betrayed the demand for a separate state of Gorkhaland. It was reported that his house and office were attacked by the alleged GJM supporters at this time.

Tamang always believed in pursuing a peaceful course in the struggle for Gorkhaland. In fact, he pursued this struggle for a separate state of Gorkhaland till the day he died. Prior to his assassination on 21 May 2010, he had helped to bring together some non-GJM parties under the banner of Democratic Front.

== Death ==
On 21st May 2010, Tamang had gone out from his home Rhododendron Dell to attend the public meeting held at Upper Clubside, Darjeeling, to celebrate the 68th Foundation Day of Akhil Bharatiya Gorkha League.

Around 9:30 in the morning, while overseeing the preparations for the public meeting in the area of the Planters Club, Tamang and other members of the Akhil Bharatiya Gorkha League, around 150 people allegedly armed with weapons entered the venue of the meeting.

It is reported that the attackers used stones to throw at the people while others beat Tamang with their knives called khukris causing serious injury to him.

Tamang was first taken to the District Hospital of Darjeeling before he was shifted to Siliguri for further treatment. However, due to the critical situation of Tamang, the car was driven back to Darjeeling where he died on the way. On 25 May, hundreds of mourners joined his funeral procession after which his body was taken to his native village of Meghma for the last rites. Later, his wife Bharati Tamang was elected as the president of ABGL.

Nicole Tamang, who belongs to the Gorkha Janmukti Morcha, was implicated in the assault case against Tamang. However, he managed to escape from the custody of the Criminal Investigation Department of West Bengal on 22 August 2010.

In January 2011, the Calcutta High Court directed the Central Bureau of Investigation (CBI) to take over the investigation.

The other accused, Dinesh Subba (alias Kainla), who was reported to have stabbed Tamang, is also absconding.

Puran Bahadur Rai was arrested by the Central Bureau of Investigation (CBI) on February 6, 2025, in Bengaluru, Karnataka, for the crime. Rai had been evading the clutches of police and had moved from Darjeeling to Bengaluru after 2017, as per CBI.

== Legacy ==
In 2020, a statue measuring 12 feet was inaugurated at Upper Clubside where he was assassinated. The statue is that of Tamang giving a speech to the public using documents in one hand and pointing his other hand upwards.
