= Darjeeling Himalayan hill region =

Mountainous area of West Bengal, India

Darjeeling Himalayan hill region, also known as the Darjeeling Hills or Darjeeling Himalaya, is a mountainous area on the north-western side of the state of West Bengal in India. This region belongs to the Eastern Himalaya range. The Darjeeling district except the Siliguri subdivision and the entire Kalimpong district constitute this region. It arises abruptly from the Terai region. The region slopes from a south to north direction. The river Teesta divides the region in two parts — the region to the east of Teesta and the region to the west of Teesta.

== Hills to the west of Teesta ==
This is the highest region of the Darjeeling Himalayan Hill Region. Two distinct ranges are visible here — the Singalila range and the Darjeeling-Kurseong range.

=== Singalila range ===
The Singalila range is on the western limit of the region and separates Nepal from West Bengal. Singalila National Park is situated here. The four highest peaks of this range are:

1. Phalut (3,595 m)
2. Sandakphu (3,630 m) — the highest point of West Bengal
3. Tonglu (3,036 m)
4. Sabargram (3,543 m)

See: Singalila Ridge

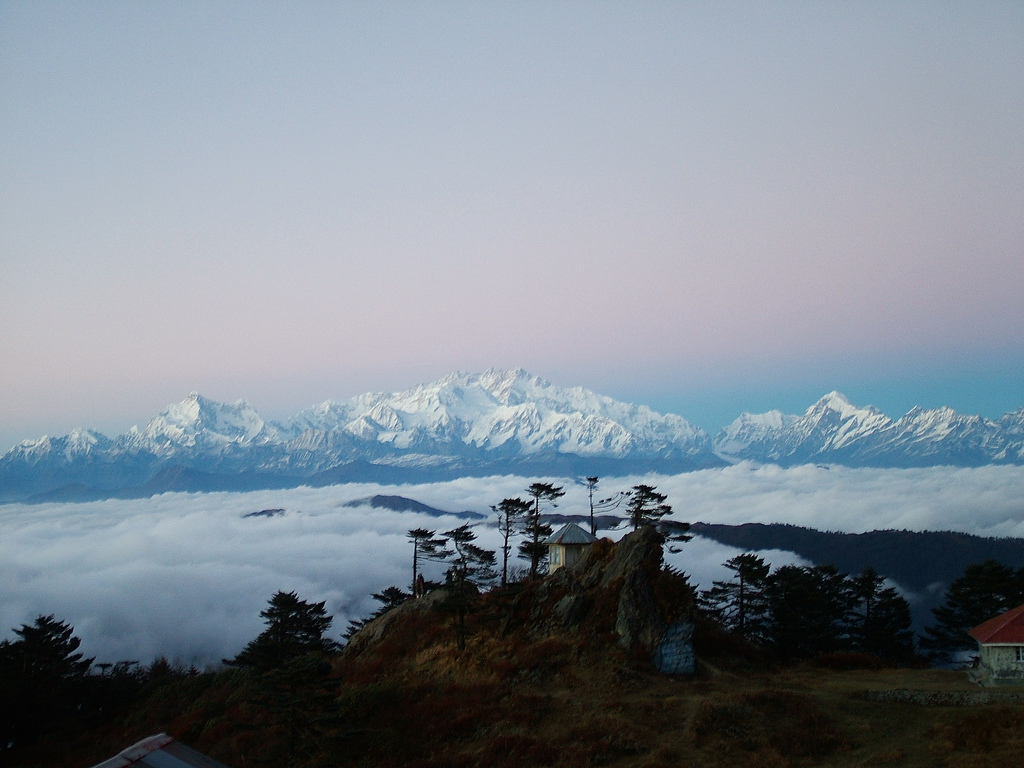
Panoramic view from Mt. Sandakphu

=== Darjeeling-Kurseong range ===
Two notable peaks of this range are Tiger Hill and Senchal.

== Hills to the east of Teesta ==
The Chola range is situated on the Sikkim-Bhutan border. The highest peak is Wrishila. Kalimpong district is situated in this region. Neora Valley National Park is located here.

== Rivers ==
Some notable rivers of this region are Mechi, Balason, Rammam, Rangeet, Teesta, and Jaldhaka. Teesta river is a 309 km (192 mi) long river flowing through the Indian states of West Bengal and Sikkim through Bangladesh before emptying into the Brahmaputra River.

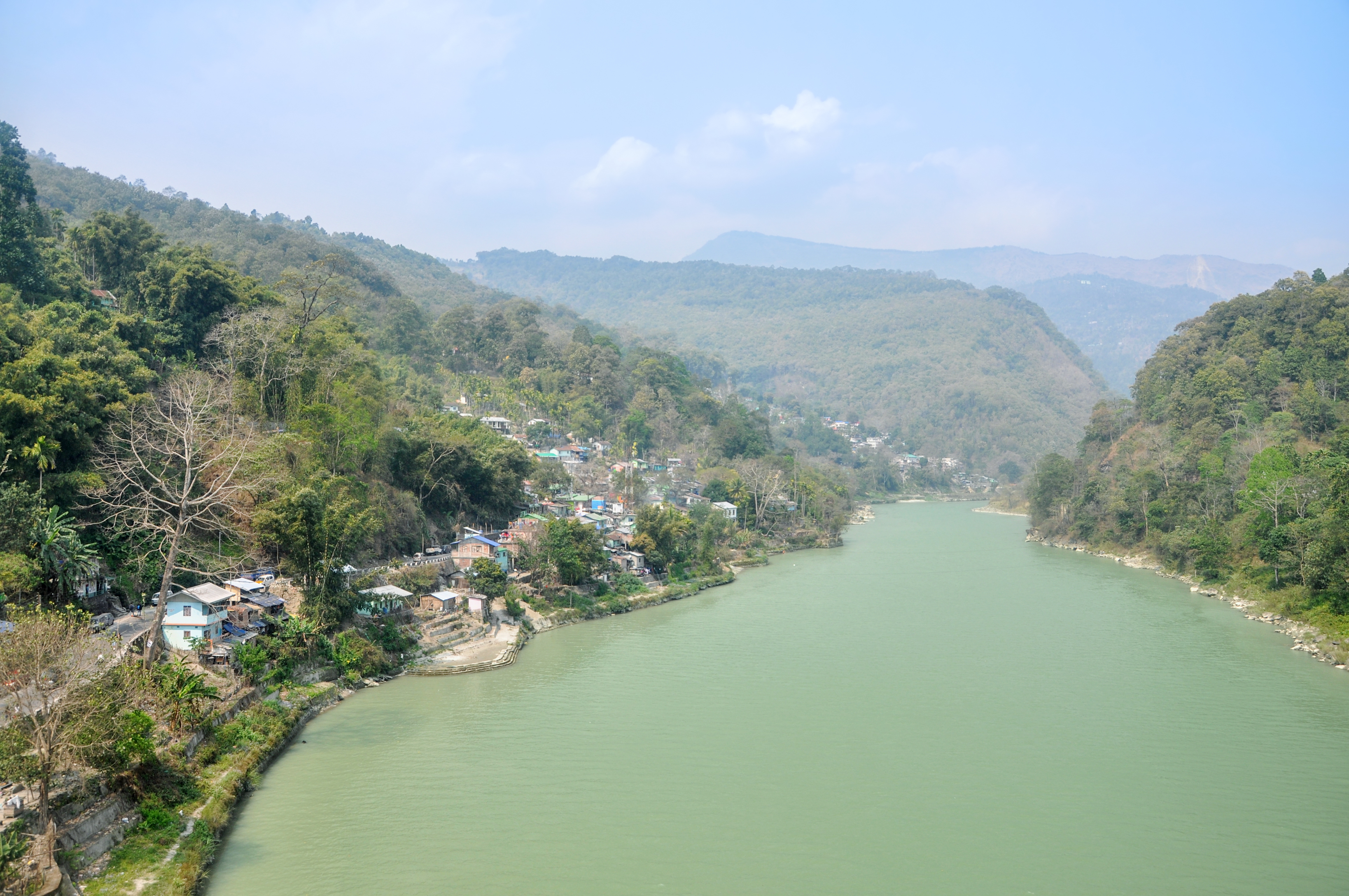
River Teesta near Siliguri, West Bengal
