= Gairibans =

- Village
- Country: India
- State: West Bengal
- District: Darjeeling

Languages
  - Official: Nepali, English
- Time zone: UTC+5:30 (IST)

Gairibans (2621 m), located near the India – Nepal border, is a small settlement inside the Singalila National Park in the Darjeeling Sadar subdivision, Darjeeling district in the state of West Bengal, India. It is a roadside halt along the trekking route from Manebhanjan to Sandakphu.
