= Uttarey =

Uttarey उत्तरे
- Village
- Location in Sikkim, India Uttarey (India)
- Coordinates: 27.260°N 88.095°E
- Country: India
- State: Sikkim
- District: Gyalshing (formerly West Sikkim)
- Subdivision: Gyalshing
- Gram Panchayat Unit: Maneybung Sopakha
- Elevation: 2,000 m (6,600 ft)
- Time zone: UTC+5:30 (IST)
- Vehicle registration: SK
- Website: https://gyalshing.nic.in/tourist-place/utteray/

Uttarey is a mountain village located in the Gyalshing subdivision of Gyalshing district (formerly West Sikkim) in the Indian state of Sikkim. It lies close to the border with eastern Nepal and forms a northern gateway to the Singalila Ridge and several high‑altitude trekking routes. It is also known for its quiet mountain setting, dense forests, trout farm, traditional Limboo and Bhutia cultural presence, and its proximity to popular trekking routes such as Phoktey Dara and the Singalila Range.

== Geography ==
Uttarey is situated in the western part of Sikkim at an elevation of around 2000 metres on the northern slopes of the Singalila Ridge. The village lies close to the border with eastern Nepal and is surrounded by dense temperate forests, steep valleys and high mountain terrain typical of the eastern Himalayas. The area provides views towards the Kanchenjunga range and serves as an approach point to several high-altitude passes and ridgelines, including Chewabhanjyang and Phoktey Dara. The climate of Uttarey is predominantly cool and temperate, with cold winters and mild, moist summers influenced by its elevation and forest cover.

== Tourism ==
Uttarey is promoted as a quiet, offbeat mountain destination known for its natural scenery, forested surroundings and views towards the Kanchenjunga range. The village is located close to the Singshore Bridge, one of the highest suspension bridges in the region, which serves as a major attraction for visitors. Local points of interest include a trout farm, small monasteries and viewpoints situated on the slopes above the settlement. The area also features a small recreational space known as Titanic Park, which is frequented by travellers exploring the western part of Sikkim.

Uttarey serves as an access point for several trekking routes, most notably the trail to Phoktey Dara and sections of the Singalila Ridge, which are known for panoramic Himalayan vistas and rhododendron forests. The village’s quiet environment and proximity to high-altitude passes near the Nepal border make it a popular base for nature-oriented tourism and trekking activities.
