= Tumling =

Coordinates: 27.0311°N 88.0692°E

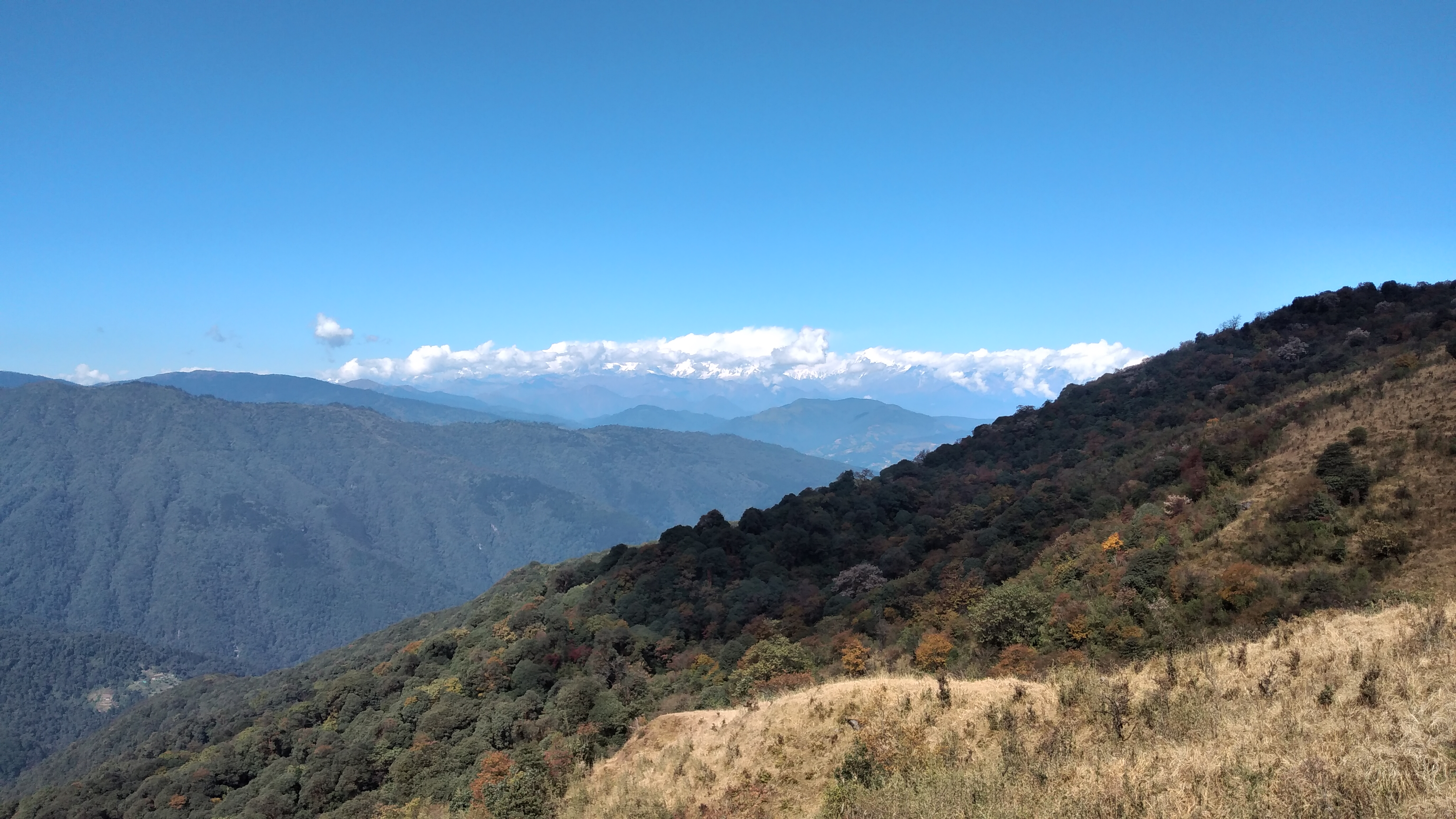
Himalayan Range from Tumling on Sunny afternoon

Tumling is a small hamlet in Jogmai VDC, Ilam District of Nepal. A tourist attraction in Eastern Himalayas at an altitude of 3050-3410m(10,700 ft), its population is composed mostly of Gurung families, with the total population being a mere 15 in number. It is roughly 35 minutes' walk from Meghma and close to Darjeeling. The only vehicle going to Tumling is the old Land Rover from Manebhanjan. Lodging in this hamlet consists of mainly the Mountain Lodge, which has views of the Kanchenzunga seen from its room.

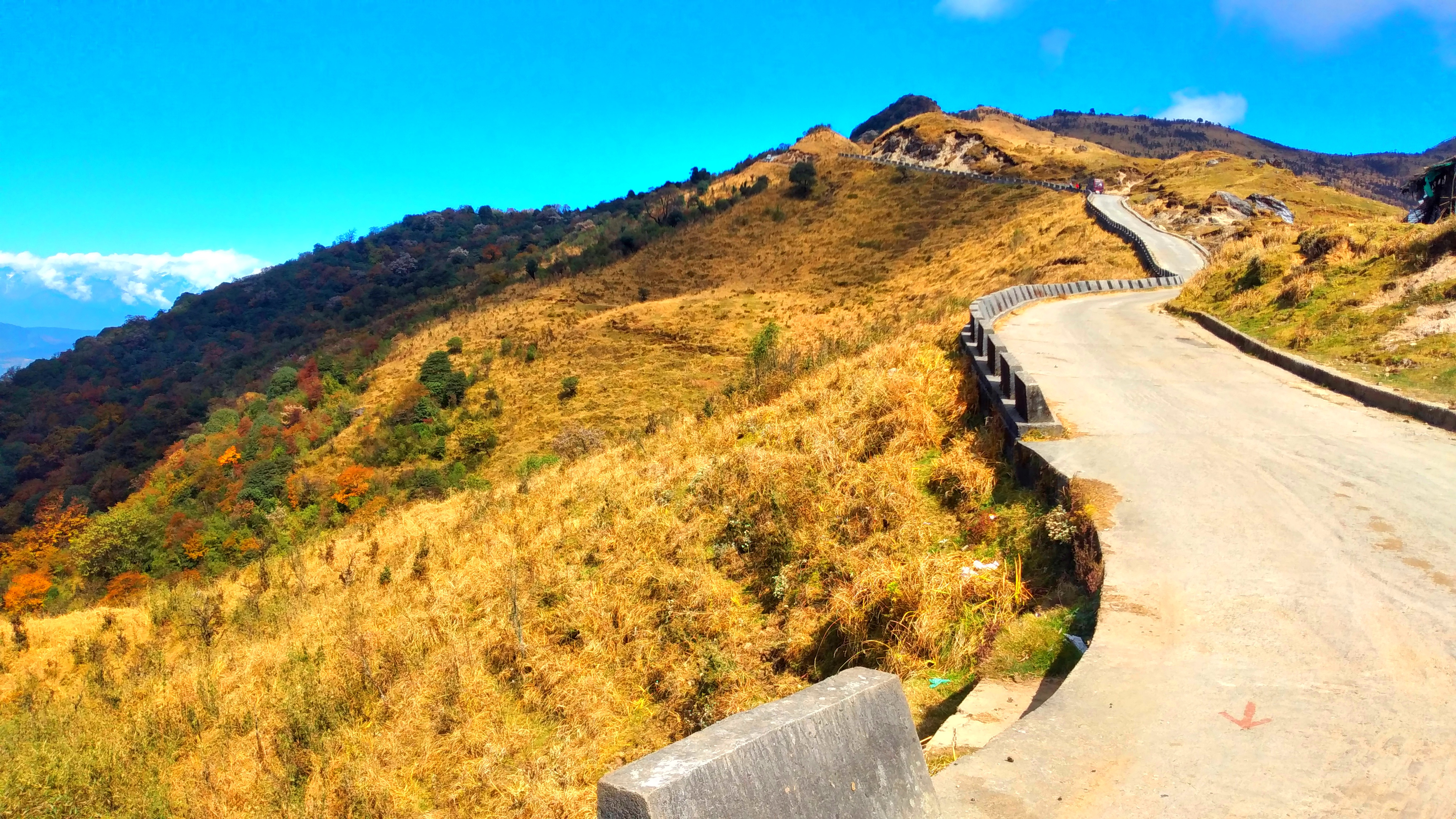
Sunkissed Trail Of Tumling

It is roughly 10.5 km uphill from the town of Manebhanjan and is a common stop for the trekkers going up to Sandakphu. From Manebhanjan where the trek or the Jeep safari starts, Tumling is at a distance of about 10.5 km. There are probably only 10 to 12 Nepali families who live here. There are also few private lodges and huts that have come up here to cater to tourists & trekkers heading towards Sandakphu. Tumling actually is part of Nepal although there is no restriction for Indians or foreigners with Indian visa. In fact the border between India and Nepal in this part is quite blurred and there is a free way for all. One is able to see the Kangchenjunga Range from here and going forward for about 15 minutes visitors can notice the Mount Everest.
