= Murmidang =

- Location within West Bengal Location within India
- Coordinates: 27°07′N 88°11′E
- Country: India
- State: West Bengal
- District: Darjeeling
- Time zone: UTC+5:30 (IST)

Murmidang is a village in Darjeeling district, West Bengal, India. It has 120 houses. The Rammam River flows from this place.

== Geography ==
The following areas surround Murmidang: north – Kolbong; south – Rammam River; west – Sikkim; east – Dharbari. Prakash Khel maidan, established in 2000, is the main playground of Murmidang.

== Agriculture ==
Murmidang is famous for rice (paddy) cultivation. Other agricultural products include corn, millet, beans and potato. Squash farming is on the rise. Orange is a cultivated here. All vegetables and fruits are supplied to markets in Siliguri.

== Population ==
The total population of the village is about 1,000.
