= Meghma =

Meghma মেঘমা • मेघमा • མེག་མ།
- Village
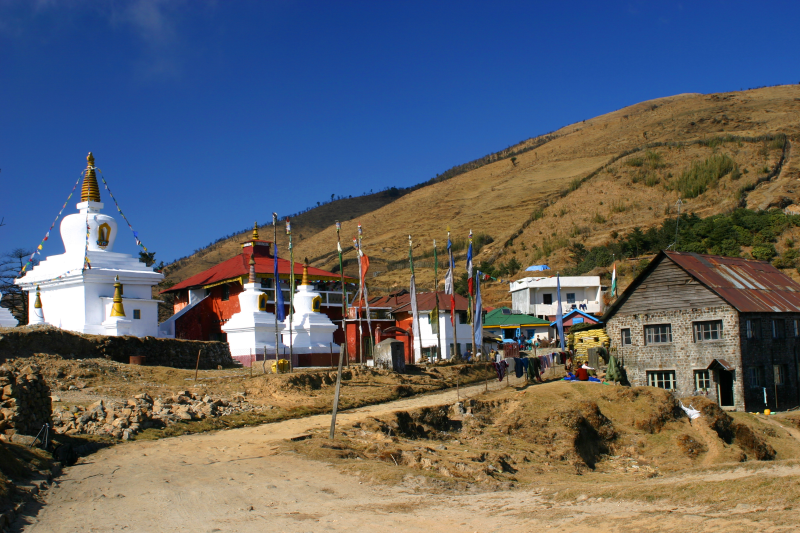
- Meghma village on way to Sandakphu

- Location in West Bengal, India Meghma (India)
- Coordinates: 27°01′25″N 88°04′59″E
- Country: India
- State: West Bengal
- District: Darjeeling
- Elevation: 2,600 m (8,500 ft)

Meghma (2600 m) is a small hamlet inside the Singalila National Park in the Darjeeling subdivision, Darjeeling district in the state of West Bengal in India near the India - Nepal border, and lies on the Sandakphu trek.

== Tourism ==
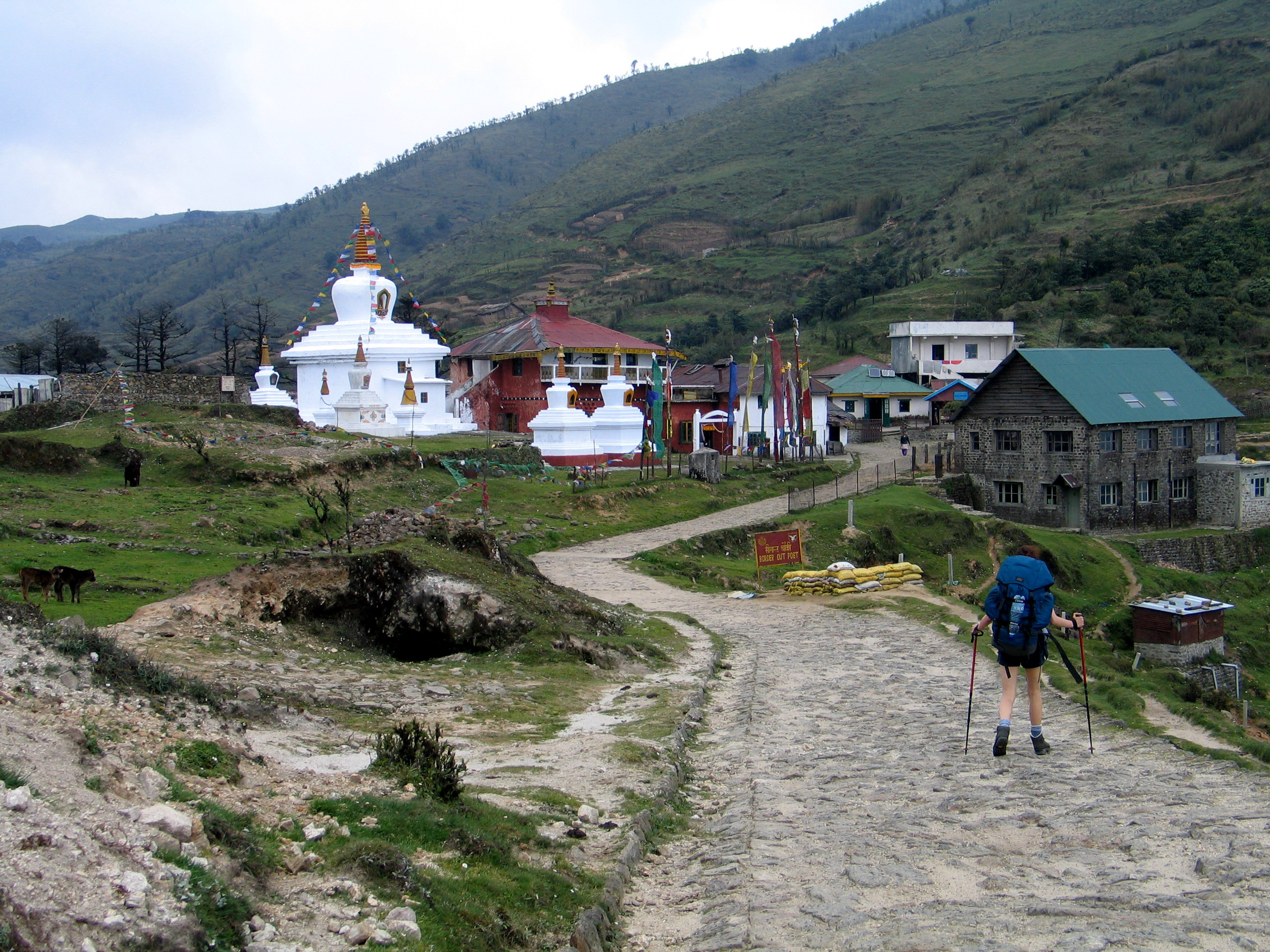
A trekker entering the Meghma village towards Sandakphu

Meghma, as the name suggests, is covered by clouds most of the time. The tourists or the guests entering Meghma are welcomed by the Buddhist monastery because the cloud is a magician which conceals and reveals the monastery. Built in the early fifties, it is one of the prominent monasteries of the region because it treasures 108 forms of Buddha. These 108 Buddhas are believed to be encountered in one's journey from this world to the next, (Sukhawati Bhavan) depending on his Karma.

Meghma is the cleanest village in this area and a suitable place to take rest and probably the best place to take the first halt to prepare for a long Singalila Trek. It is situated about 3 hours of trekking from Manebhanjan.

== Economy ==
The main source of income is from agriculture and people here grow a number of vegetables namely Carrot, Turnip, Potato, Cabbage, Radish, Beet Root and Celery. Apart from this people produce cheese and butter from cow milk. They find Maneybhanjang as the nearest market to sell off their goods but, if they can sell it in Darjeeling they fetch more money.

There is a small tea factory in the village where tea is processed completely hand made. Factory processes tea from near tea estate which is one of the highest tea estates in the Himalayas and lies at around 2400m to 2800m above sea level.

It was also the ancestral place of Darjeeling politician, Madan Tamang.
