= Rammam River =

River in West Bengal, India

Coordinates: 27°07′53″N 88°16′42″E

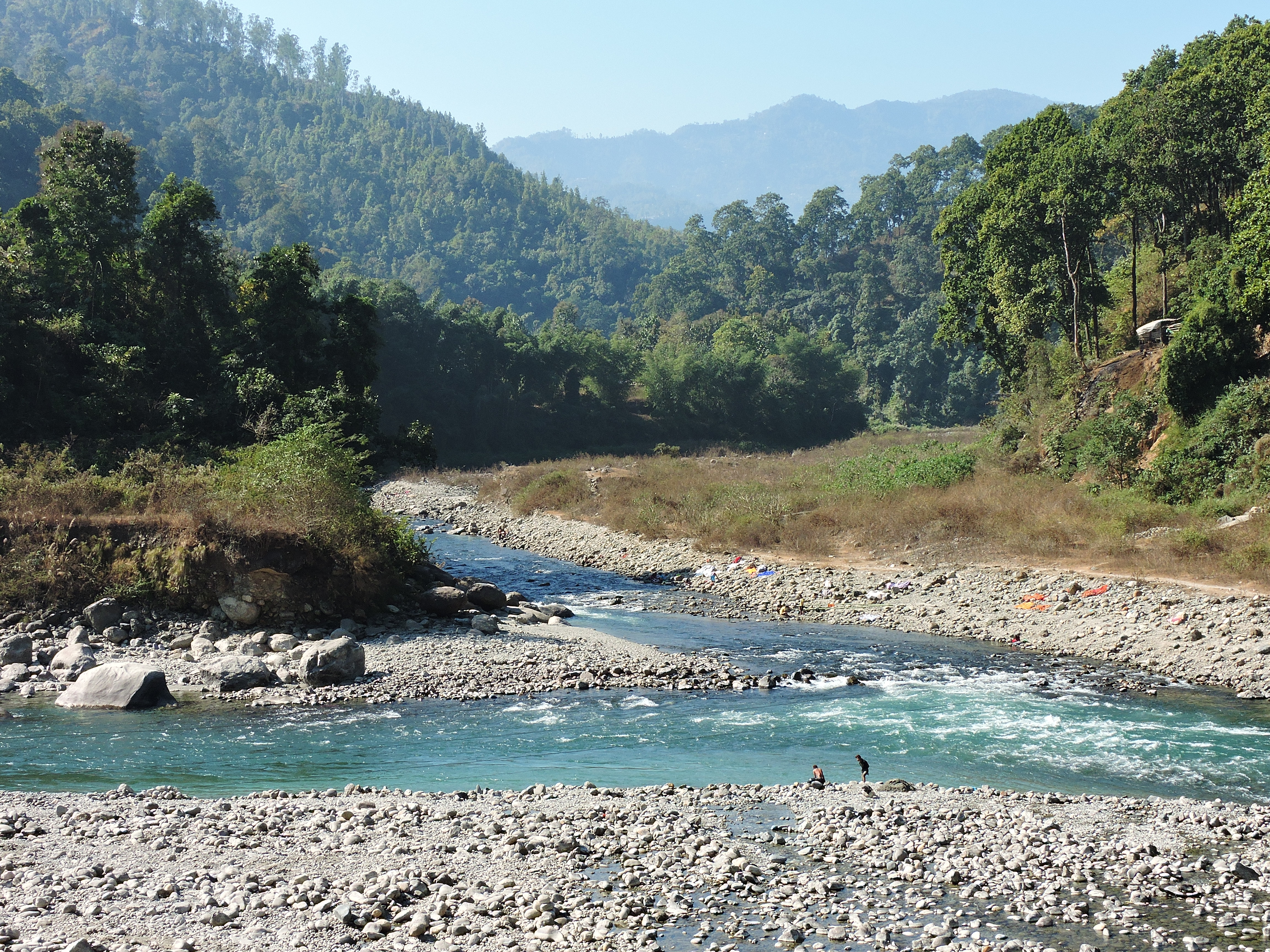
River at Jorethang

Rammam River is river in the Darjeeling district of West Bengal, India. It originates in the Singalila range and has much of its course through Darjeeling district. One city that the river flows through is Murmidang. Lodhoma River is a tributary of Rammam. Rammam finally merges with the Rangeet River near Jorethang. Rammam Hydel Power Station is a major hydropower project of West Bengal State Electricity Board.
