= Hunku Chuli =

Mountain in Nepal

- Hongku Chuli
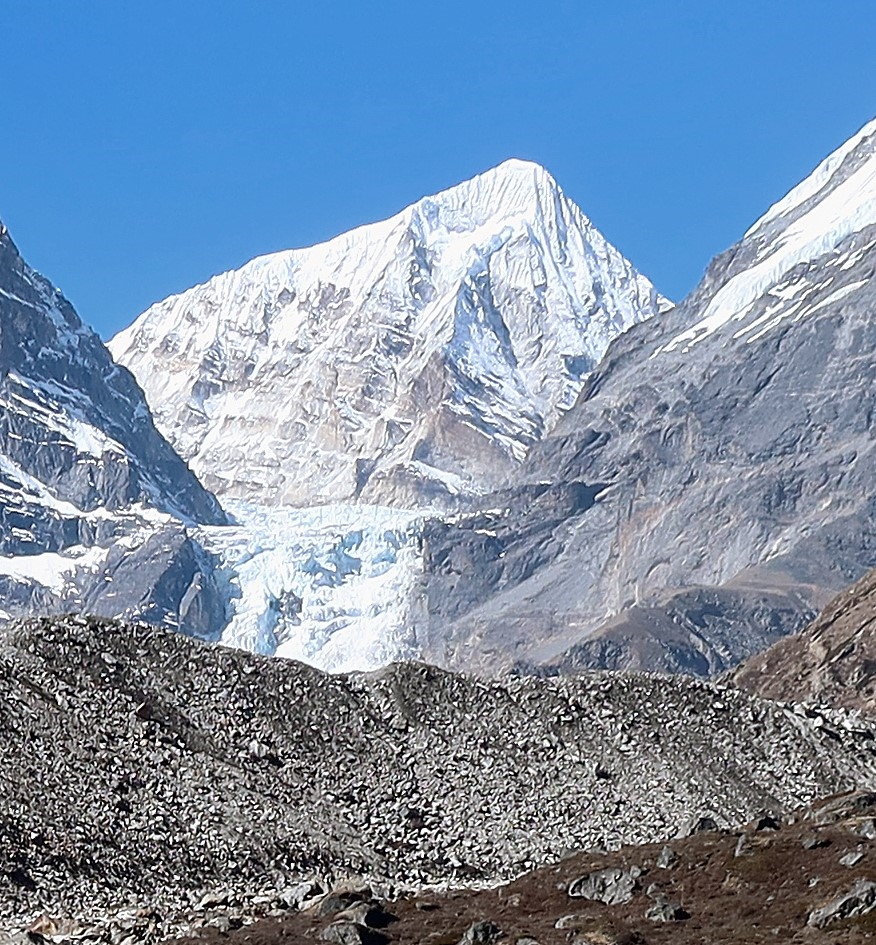
- East aspect

Highest point
- Elevation: 6,833 m (22,418 ft)
- Prominence: 733 m (2,405 ft)
- Parent peak: Chamlang
- Isolation: 3.01 km (1.87 mi)
- Coordinates: 27°49′03″N 87°00′43″E

Geography
- Location within Nepal
- Interactive map of Hunku Chuli
- Country: Nepal
- Province: Koshi
- District: Solukhumbu / Sankhuwasabha
- Protected area: Makalu Barun National Park
- Parent range: Himalaya; Mahalangur Himal

Hunku Chuli, also known as Hongku Chuli, is a mountain in Nepal.

== Description ==
Hunku Chuli is a 6,833-metre (22,418-foot) glaciated summit in the Nepalese Himalayas. It is situated 11 kilometres (6.8 mi) southwest of Makalu in Makalu Barun National Park. Precipitation runoff from the mountain's west slope drains to the Hongu River, whereas all other slopes drain to the Barun River. Topographic relief is significant as the east face rises 1,130 metres (3,707 ft) in one kilometre (0.62 mi), and the west slope rises 830 metres (2,723 ft) in 0.5 kilometre (0.3 mi). The first authorized ascent of the summit was made on October 15, 2021, by Benjamin Védrines via the Southwest Ridge, although unauthorized parties may have climbed it prior.

== Climate ==
Based on the Köppen climate classification, Hunku Chuli is located in a tundra climate zone with cold, snowy winters, and cool summers. Weather systems coming off the Bay of Bengal are forced upwards by the Himalaya mountains (orographic lift), causing heavy precipitation in the form of rainfall and snowfall. Mid-June through early-August is the monsoon season. The months of April, May, September, and October offer the most favorable weather for viewing or climbing this peak.

== Gallery ==
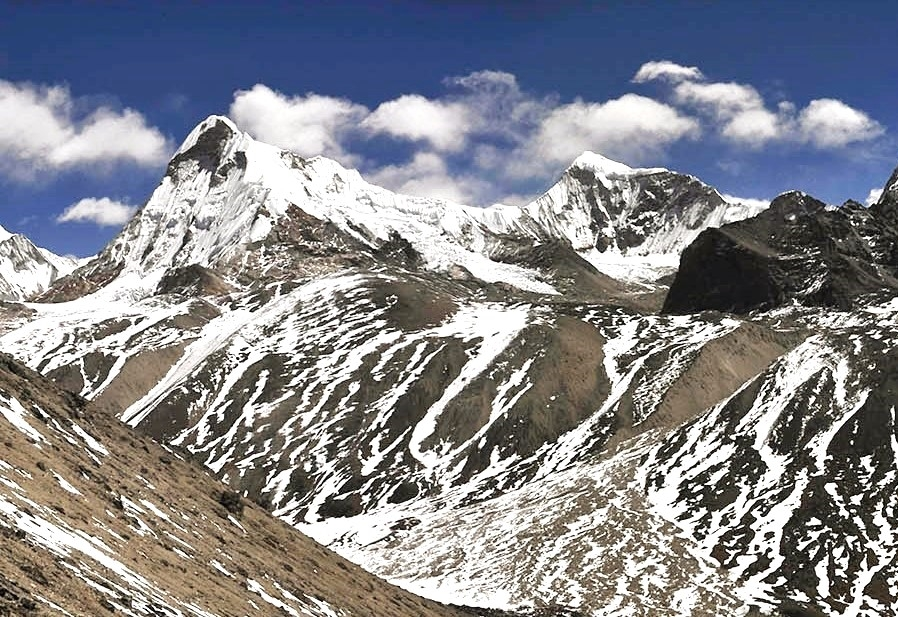
West aspect of Hunku Chuli (right) and West Hunku Chuli (6764m) to left

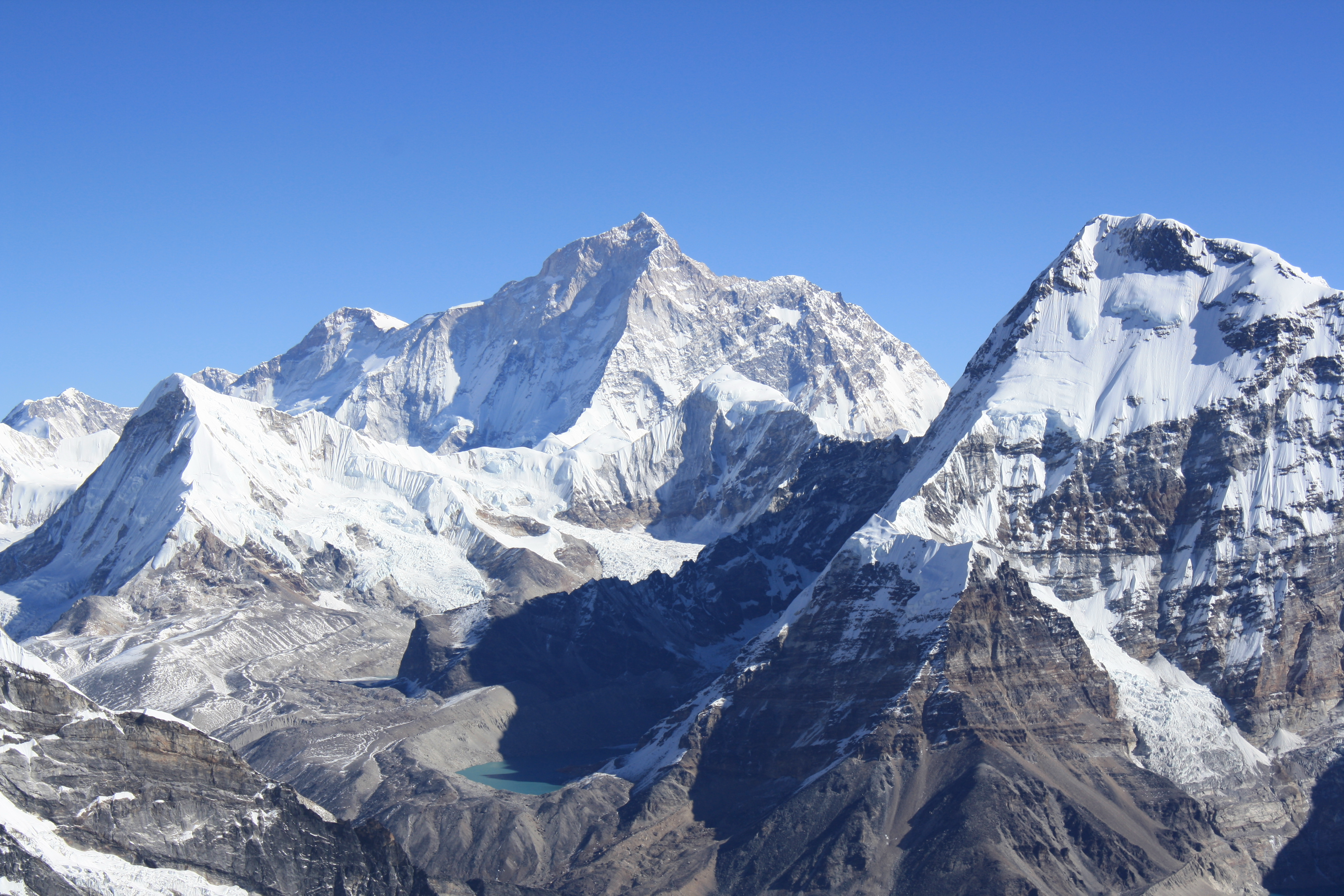
Hunku Chuli centered (below Makalu)

== See also ==
- Geology of the Himalayas
