= Sandakphu =

Mountain and highest point in West Bengal

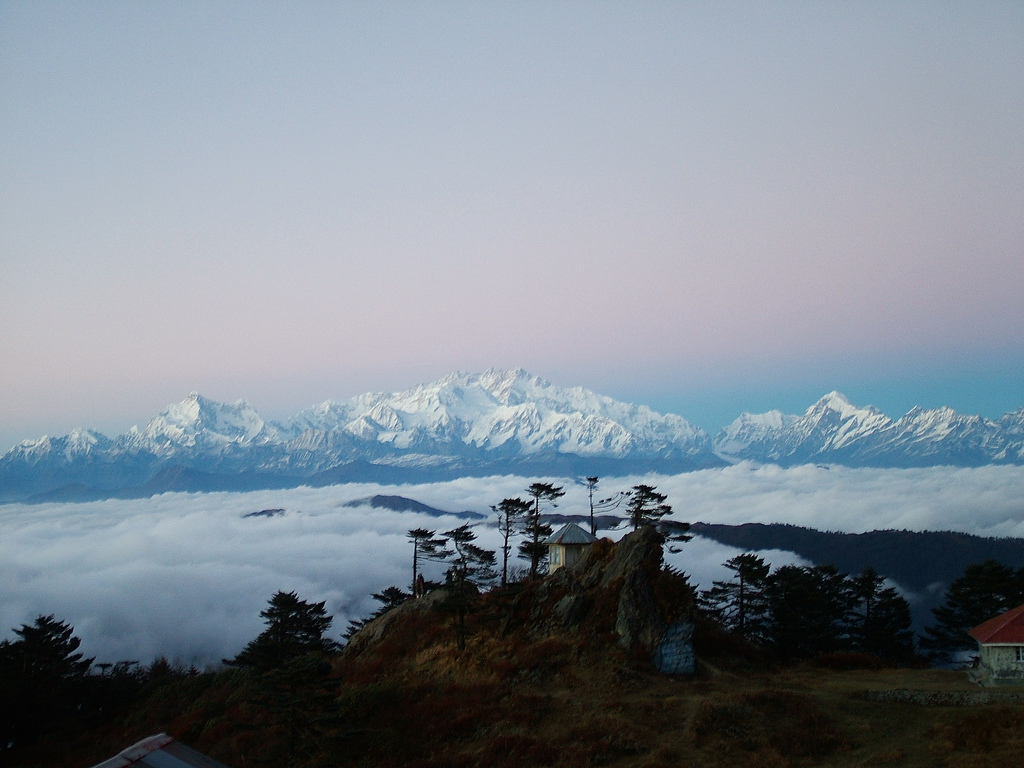
- View from Sandakphu in Darjeeling West Bengal

Highest point
- Elevation: 3,636 m (11,929 ft)
- Prominence: 356 m (1,168 ft)
- Listing: List of Indian states and territories by highest point
- Coordinates: 27°6′21″N 88°0′6″E

Geography
- Location within West Bengal
- Places and tea estates in the north-western portion of Darjeeling Sadar subdivision (including Darjeeling Pulbazar CD block) in Darjeeling district. Key: C: census town, R: rural/ urban centre, N: neighbourhood, H: hill centre, P: national park/ wildlife sanctuary, T: tourist attraction Abbreviations used in names – G for Tea Garden (town/village), E for Tea Estate; Mouse over shows names of tea estates. Owing to space constraints in the small map, the locations in the larger map on click through may vary slightly. Location of Sandakphu peak
- Location: Darjeeling district, West Bengal, India; Ilam District, Koshi Province, Nepal
- Parent range: Singalila Ridge
- Topo map: Google topographic map

Climbing
- Easiest route: Hiking or by car

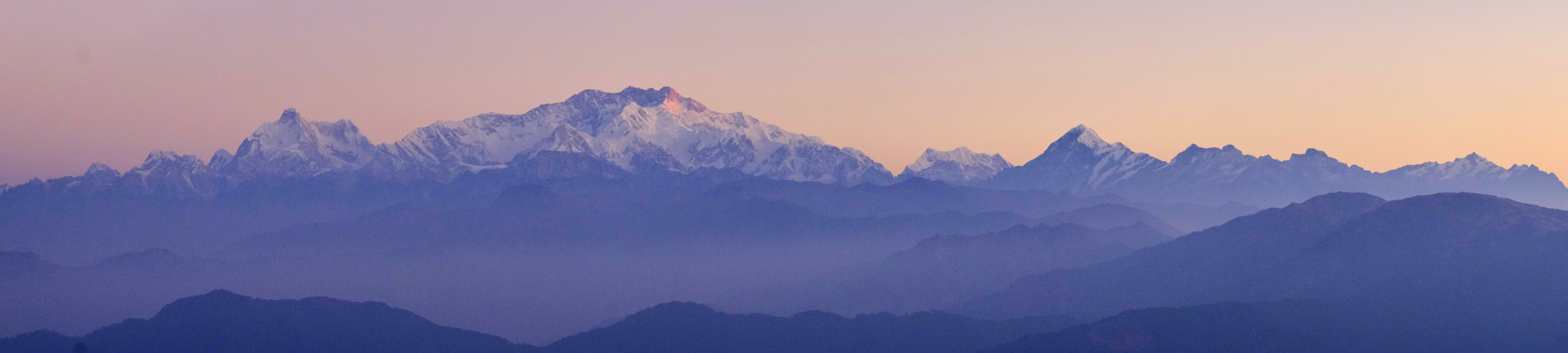
The Sleeping Buddha

Sandakphu or Sandakpur at 3,636 m (11,929 ft) is a mountain peak in the Singalila Ridge on the border between India and Nepal. It is the highest point of the ridge and of the state of West Bengal, India. The peak is located at the edge of the Singalila National Park and has a small village on the summit with a few hotels. Four of the five highest peaks in the world, Everest, Kangchenjunga, Lhotse and Makalu can be seen from its summit. It also affords a view of the entire Kangchenjunga Range. Sandakphu is also known as the land of poisonous flowers.

== Etymology ==
The name is derived from the Tibeto-Burman Lepcha language and is translated as "the height of the poisonous plant" - in reference to the former abundance at the locality (present around a century ago) of the poisonous plants Aconitum ferox and certain rhododendron species.The danger of fatal poisoning to sheep and cattle being driven through the area was so great that they had to be muzzled to prevent them grazing/browsing upon these toxic species (Aconitum ferox has a good claim to being the most poisonous plant species in the world).

== Trekking ==
=== India ===
The trek along the Singalila Ridge to Sandakphu and Phalut is one of the most popular in the Eastern Himalayas, owing not only to the vistas of the Kangchenjunga and Everest ranges which it affords, but also to its seasonal wildflowers and opportunities for birdwatching. Treks begin at Manebhanjan which is 28 km (17 mi) (approx. 1 hour by road) from Darjeeling.

==== Ascent ====
The Sandakphu trekking routes inside the Singalila National Park have four legs or stages.

- Manebhanjan to Meghma – height 2,600 m (8,500 ft): This is a 4-hour trek through the lower forest. The route goes via Chitre.
- Meghma to Gairibans – height 2,621 m (8,599 ft): There are two alternative trekking routes. They respectively go via Tonglu – height 3,070 m (10,070 ft) and Tumling – height 2,900 m (9,500 ft). From Tumling, a shorter trail cuts through Nepal and Jaubari – height 2,750 m (9,020 ft). Jaubari is ward no 07 of jamuna VDC ilam.
- Gairibans to Sandakphu – height 3,636 m (11,929 ft)
- Sandakphu to Phalut – height 3,600 m (11,800 ft): It is a one-day trek via Sabarkum – height 3,536 m (11,601 ft) covering 21 km (13 mi).

==== Descent ====
- Retracing the way back to Manebhanjan.
- A steep descent to the village of Sirikhola on the banks of the River Sirikhola, via Gurdum – height 2,300 m (7,500 ft), and from there to Rimbick.

Panorama of Peaks seen from Sandakphu and Phalut

Baruntse – height 7,220 m (23,690 ft), Chamlang – height 7,319 m (24,012 ft), Numbur – height 6,958 m (22,828 ft), Hunku Chuli – height 6,833 m (22,418 ft), Chomo Lonzo – height 7,818 m (25,650 ft), Kyashar – height 6,769 m (22,208 ft), Mera Peak – height 6,476 m (21,247 ft) Lhotse – height 8,516 m (27,940 ft), Makalu – height 8,485 m (27,838 ft), Mount Everest – height 8,849 m (29,032 ft), Nuptse – height 7,861 m (25,791 ft), Kanchenjunga – height 8,586 m (28,169 ft), Rathong – height 6,678 m (21,909 ft), Kabru N – height 7,412 m (24,318 ft), Kokthang – height 6,148 m (20,171 ft), Simvo – height 6,812 m (22,349 ft), Frey – height 5,853 m (19,203 ft), Kabru S – height 7,338 m (24,075 ft), Kabru Dome – height 6,600 m (21,700 ft), Kabru Forked – height 6,108 m (20,039 ft), Pandim – height 6,691 m (21,952 ft), Tinchenkhang – height 6,010 m (19,720 ft), Jupono – height 5,936 m (19,475 ft), Pauhunri – height 7,128 m (23,386 ft), Shudu Tsenpa – height 7,024 m (23,045 ft), Jomolhari – height 7,326 m (24,035 ft)

Villages At Glance: Gorkhey, Bhareng, Gairibas, Meghma, Maneybhanjyang, Rammam, Srikhola, Sepi, Molley, Gurdum.

=== Nepal ===
The western part of Sandakphu peak is located in Sandakpur rural municipality (ward no. 2 & 4) of Ilam District of Province No. 1.

The trekking starts from Ilam Bazar via Maipokhari, Maimajhuwa, Mabu, Kala Pokhri Bikhe Bhyanjyang to Sandakpur, and also from Ilam Bazar via Sulubung, Jamuna, Hangetham (a special area for birds such as the spiny babbler and blue tit), Piple, Kalipokhari, Bikhe Vanjyang to Sandakpur. Jamuna is a highlight for trekkers. There are several places like Dhap Pokhari and Choyatar (special area for red pandas) on the route.

== Gallery ==
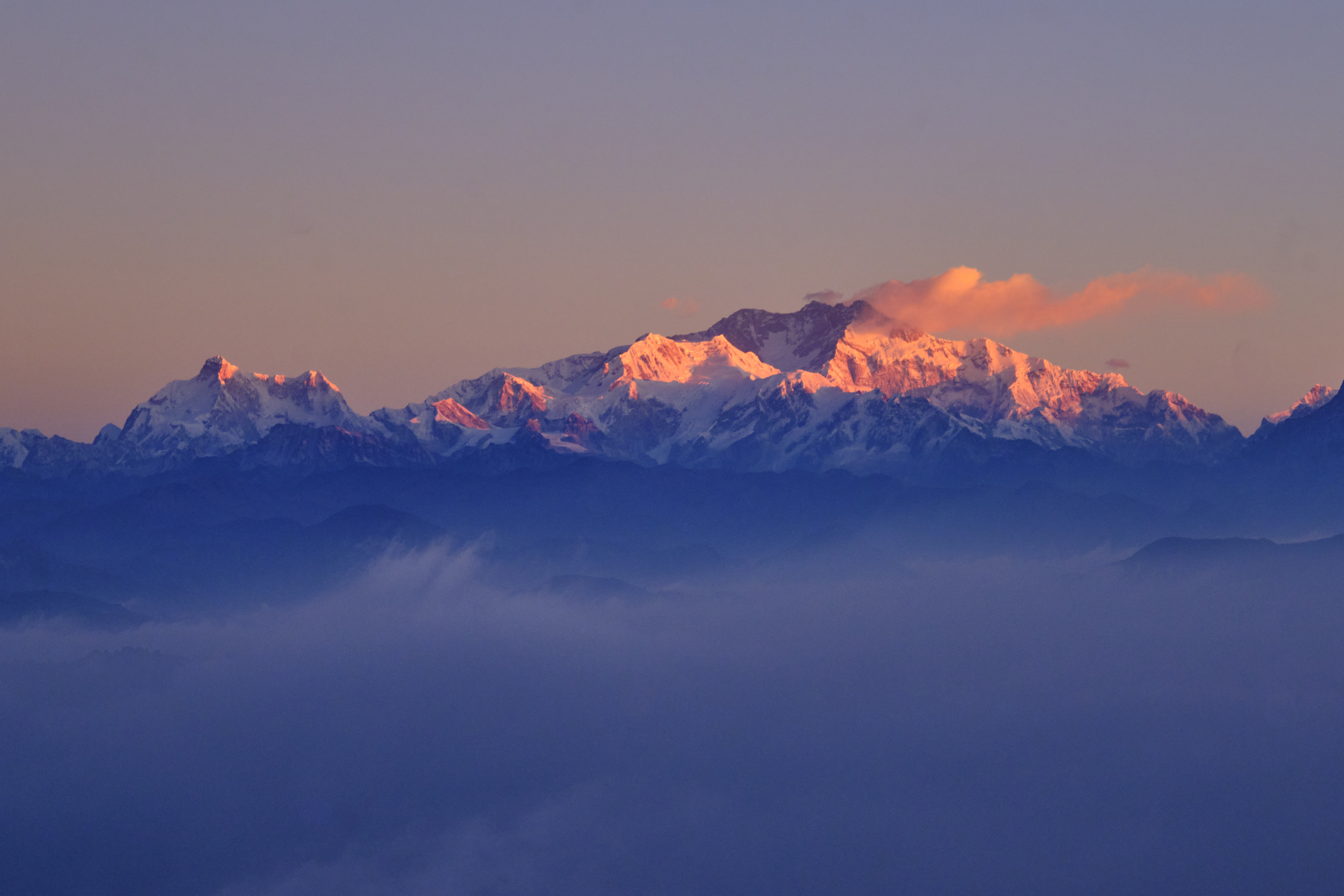
Sunrise on Mt. Kanchendzonga from Aahl near Sandakphu or Sandakpur

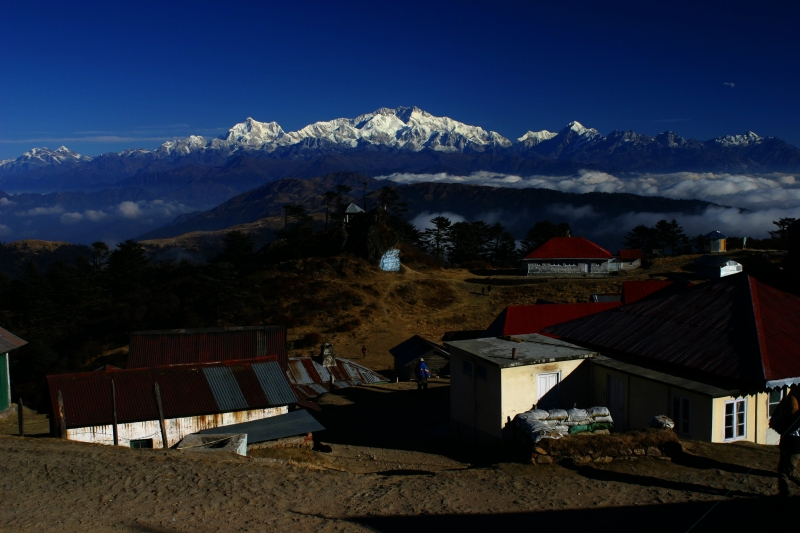
Singalila Range and Kanchenjungha seen from Sandakpur

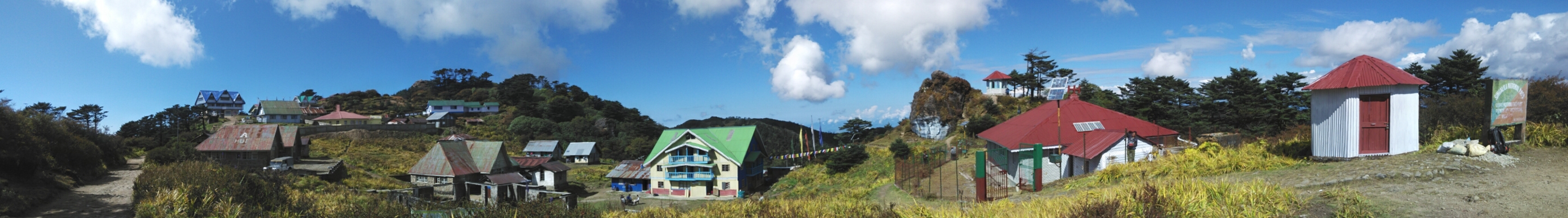
A panoramic view of Sandakpur.

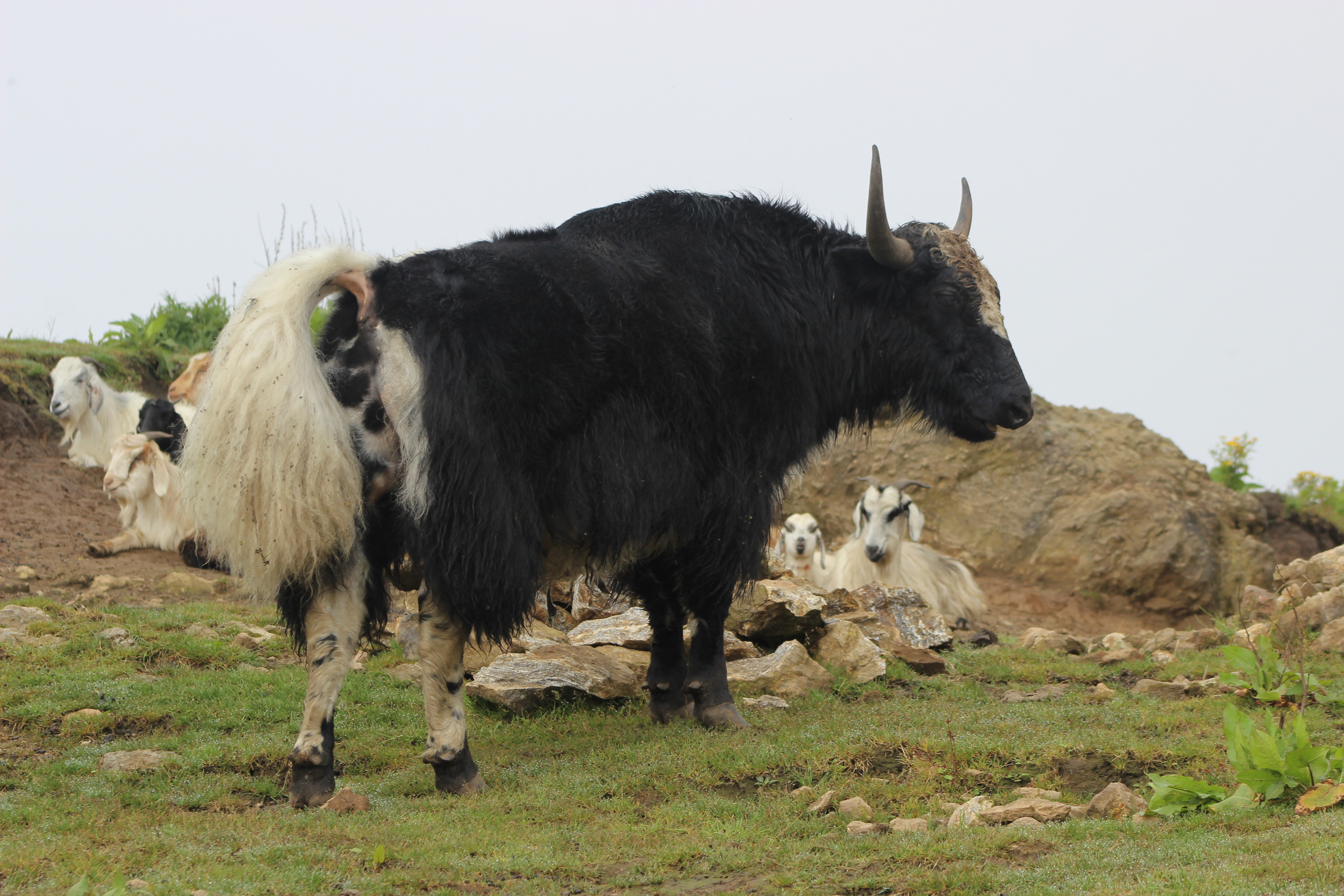
Domestic yak (Bos grunniens) near Sandakpur

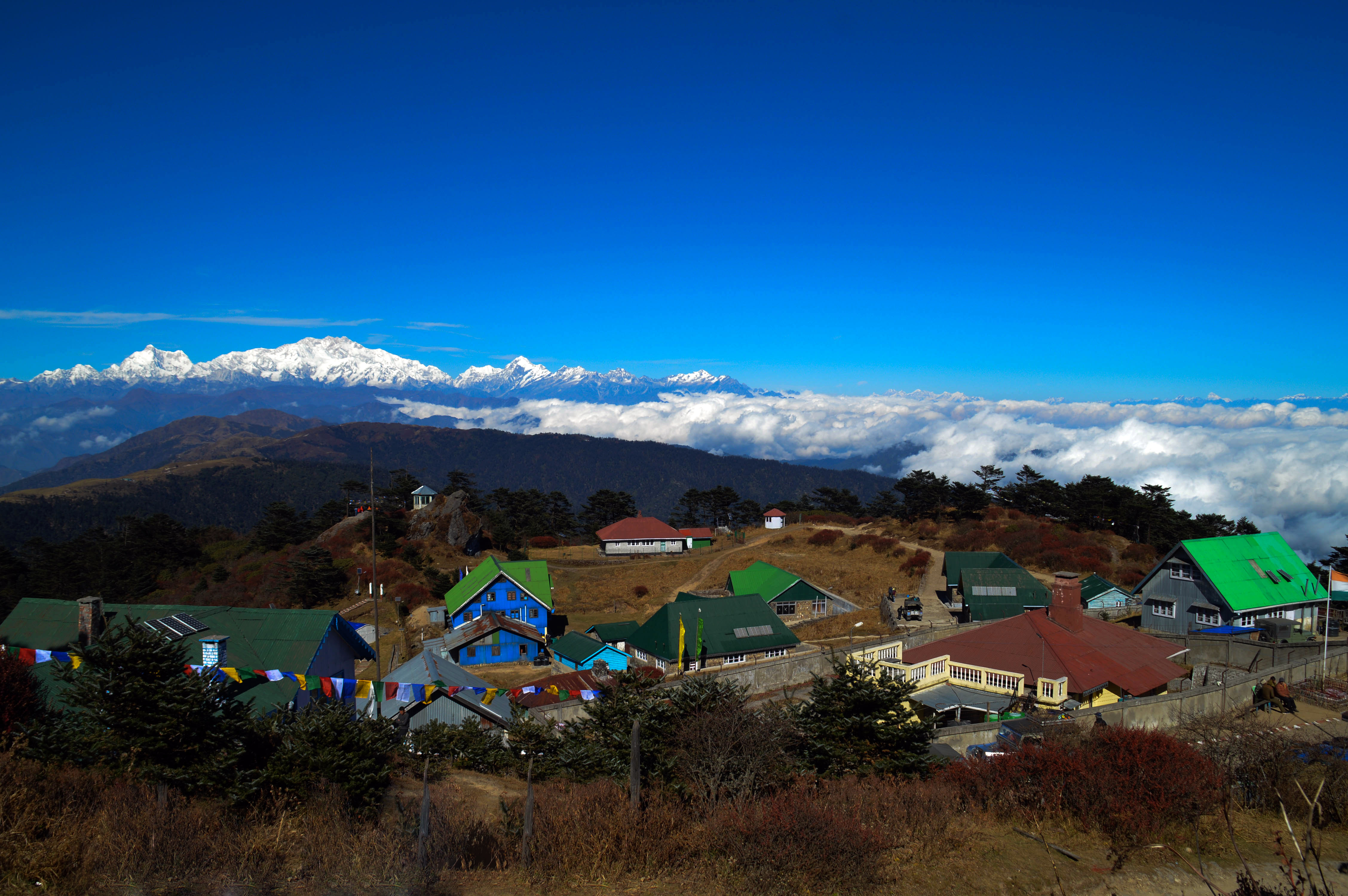
View of Sandakphu from above

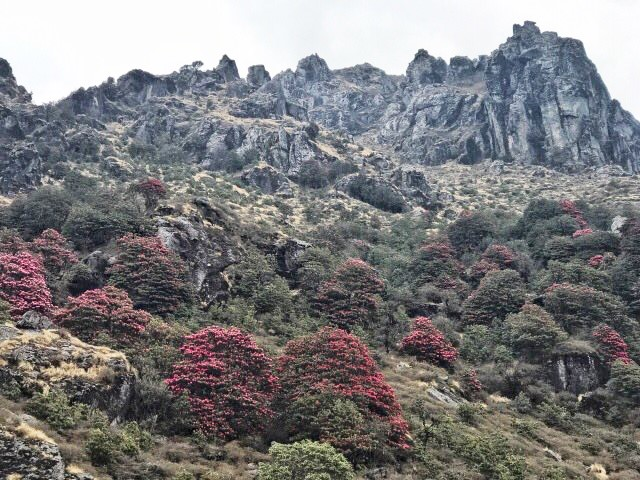
Sandakphu: shrub-clad rocky ridge with toxic, pink-flowered rhododendron species - for which it was (in part) named
