= Phalut =

Mountain in Bengal, India

Highest point
- Elevation: 3,600 m (11,800 ft)
- Coordinates: 27°12′29″N 88°00′56″E

Geography
- Country: India
- State: West Bengal
- District: Darjeeling

Phalut or Falut is a 3,600-metre (11,800 ft) mountain and the second-highest peak of West Bengal, India. Part of the Singalila Ridge in the Himalayas, it is located at the border of the Indian states of West Bengal and Sikkim and of Nepal.

It is located inside the Singalila National Park. A small bunkhouse is near the top of the peak and is administered by the Indian army. Singalila Pass, in the Singalila National Park, is 17 km away from Phalut.

The indigenous tribes surrounding the mountain peak are known as Falutians by outsiders. Falutians have a 300-year history of worshipping the mountain peak, and believe that Phalut is an omniscient god. They refer to the mountain peak as "Omna Re Ay".

== Images ==
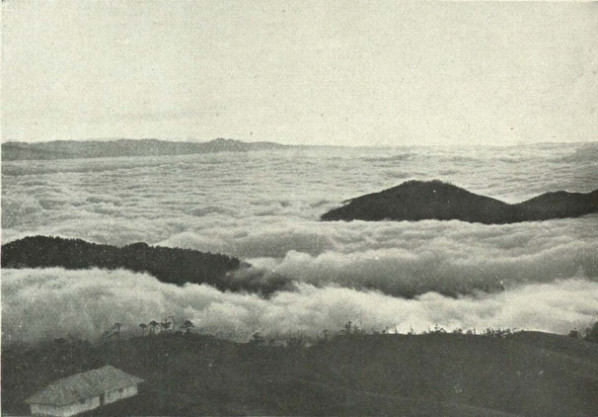
Cloud effect from Phalut, c. 1905

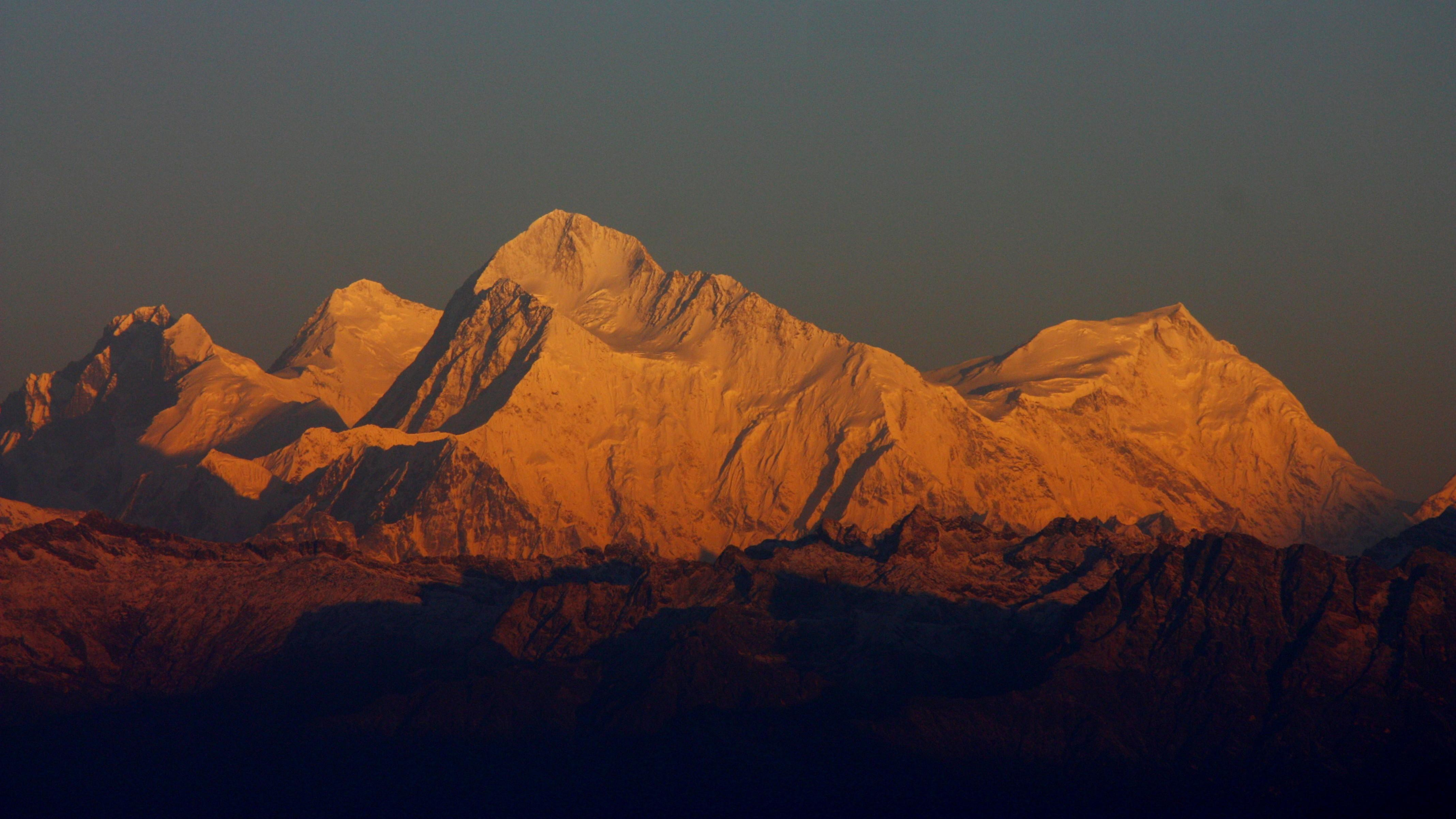
A view of the Himalayan peaks of (from the left) Mt.Lhotse, Mt.Everest, Mt.Makalu and Mt.Chomolonzo from Phalut in West Bengal, India.
