= Manebhanjyang, Darjeeling =

Maney Bhanjang মানেভঞ্জ্যাং मानेभञ्ज्याङ Maney Bhanjyang
- Transit-town
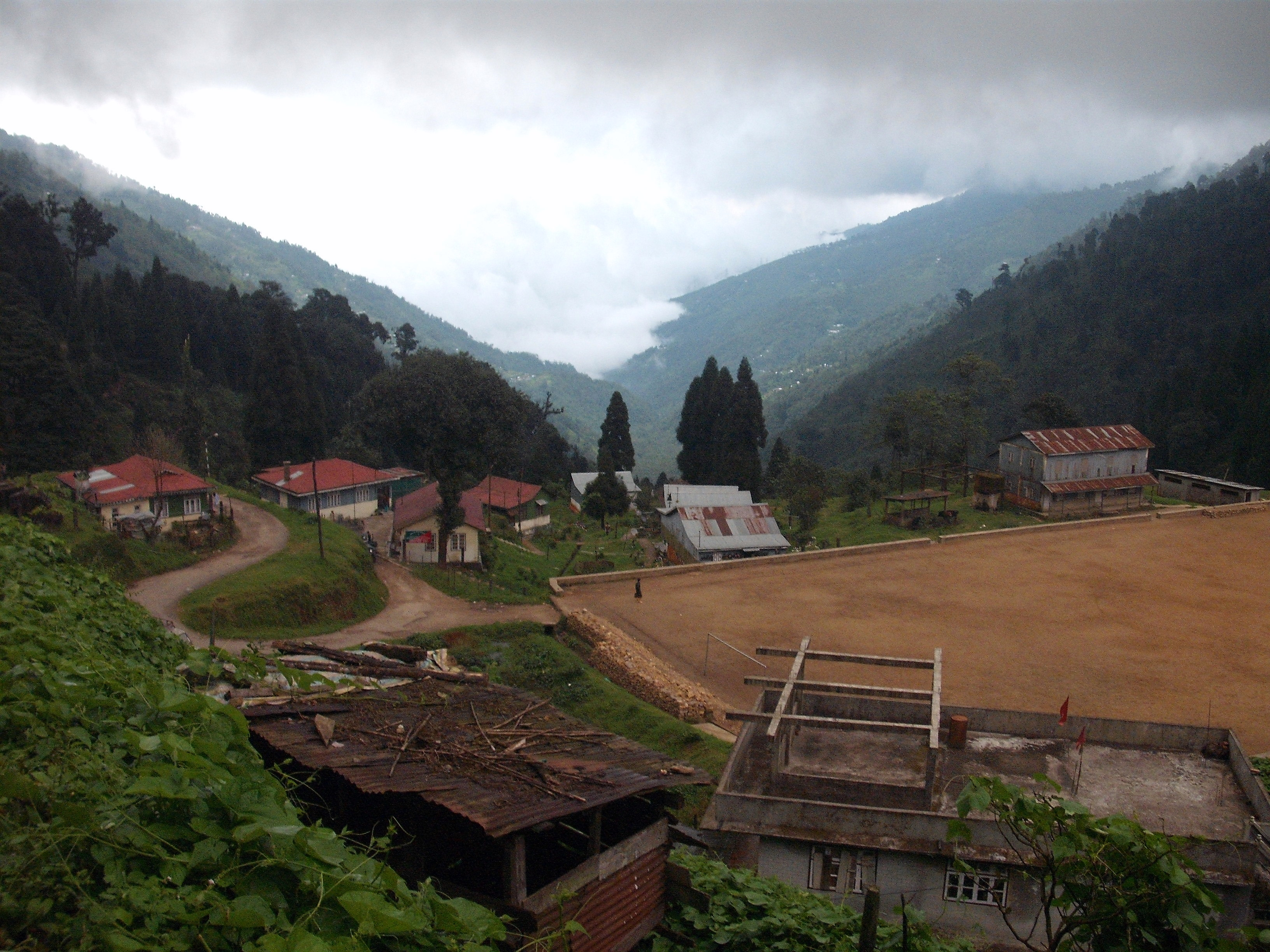

- Location in West Bengal, India Maney Bhanjang (India)
- Coordinates: 26.98°N 88.11°E
- Country: India
- State: West Bengal
- District: Darjeeling
- Elevation: 1,510 m (4,950 ft)

Languages
  - Official: Nepali Hindi, English, Bengali
- Time zone: UTC+5:30 (IST)
- PIN: 734221
- Telephone code: 0354
- Nearest city: Darjeeling

Maney Bhanjyang (1,496 m) is a small transit-town in the Darjeeling Sadar subdivision, Darjeeling district in the state of West Bengal in India. It is located at the gateway of the Singalila National Park, 28 km away from Darjeeling. The income of the local residents is geared towards tourism, especially foreign trekkers. Maney Bhanjyang is the start of the trailhead for the trek to Sandakphu on the Singalila Ridge, the highest point in West Bengal. Conveyance for Sandakphu is also available mainly from Maney Bhanjyang in the form of 42 Land Rover Series II. The 4-hour ride can be quite 'jumpy' as drivers maneuver their prized possessions along snaky curves and uphill roads.

Mane Bhanjang lies on the border between India and Nepal. The two countries are separated by a small culvert, which also acts as a motor stand for vehicles ferrying people to Sukhiapokhri and Darjeeling. This small valley is a residence of approximately 500 households with an approximate population of 6000. Being situated within the ranges of the Singalila National Park, expansion of this 'forest village' is strictly restricted beyond its current borders so as to protect the surrounding forest and its ecosystem.

The village has a renovated playground where a football tournament is organised every year during the Independence Day of India and from last 2 years, Mini Gold Cup has been organised by MBFA (Maney Bhanjyang Football Associated).

Moreover, Land Rover Taxi Association of Maney Bhanjyang is the largest operator of Land Rover Taxis in the entire South East Asia. While there are some people who claims that, this is also the biggest Land Rover Taxi operator association. Keeping aside the debate and controversy; one thing is for sure that, these fleet of ageing Land Rover Series I vehicles are the "lifeline of an entirely remote area", where there is no tar topped roads, but only some rocks laid to be called as the 'Road'.

This association is known as the Singalila Land Rover Association, and it operates a total number of 45 Land Rover Series I vehicles. Although these SUVs are more than half a century old, all of them still look and perform as good as new. From the exterior, the iconic Land Rover Green badges are gone or completely faded away; instead there are aluminium plates with the iconic Land Rover symbols and the name itself. Surely those badges took the toll of travelling on the rough roads and cloud wrapped gushy wind.

== Geography ==
Places and tea estates in the north-western portion of Darjeeling Sadar subdivision (including Darjeeling Pulbazar CD block) in Darjeeling district
CT: census town, R: rural/ urban centre, N: neighbourhood, H: hill centre, NP: national park/ wildlife sanctuary, TE: tea estate, TA: tourist attraction
Abbreviations used in names – TG for Tea Garden (town/village), TE for Tea Estate
Owing to space constraints in the small map, the actual locations in a larger map may vary slightly

Maney Bhanjyang is located at an average elevation of 1928m in the Darjeeling Himalayan Hill Region in the Singalila Ridge, the highest point in West Bengal. These hills are a part of the Mahabharata Range or Lesser Himalayas. The soil is chiefly composed of sandstone and conglomerate formations, which are the solidified and upheaved detritus of the greater range of Himalaya. However, the soil is often poorly consolidated (the permeable sediments of the region do not retain water between rains) and is not considered suitable for agriculture. The area has steep slopes and loose topsoil, leading to frequent landslides during the monsoons. According to the Bureau of Indian Standards, the area in which the village lies falls under seismic zone-IV (on a scale of I to V, in order of increasing proneness to earthquakes) near the convergent boundary of the Indian and the Eurasian tectonic plates and is subject to frequent earthquakes. The geographical co-ordinates of the village are 26.59°N 88.7°E.

Maney Bhanjyang is surrounded by several small villages and hamlets within a radius of 5–8 km. Being a border of Nepal and India, the Friday Market or the "haat" brings the entire population of the area together for various household and business purposes.

=== Area overview ===
The map alongside shows the northern portion of the Darjeeling Himalayan hill region. Kangchenjunga, which rises with an elevation of 8,586 metres (28,169 ft) is located further north of the area shown. Sandakphu, rising to a height of 3,665 metres (12,024 ft), on the Singalila Ridge, is the highest point in West Bengal. In Darjeeling Sadar subdivision 61% of the total population lives in the rural areas and 39% of the population lives in the urban areas. There are 78 tea gardens/ estates (the figure varies slightly according to different sources), producing and largely exporting Darjeeling tea in the district. It engages a large proportion of the population directly/ indirectly. Some tea gardens were identified in the 2011 census as census towns or villages. Such places are marked in the map as CT (census town) or R (rural/ urban centre). Specific tea estate pages are marked TE.

Note: The map alongside presents some of the notable locations in the subdivision. All places marked in the map are linked in the larger full screen map.

== Transport ==
Maney Bhanjyang can be reached directly from New Jalpaiguri railway station where hired vehicles are available, although the number of vehicles are limited. Most vehicles are available from 4 am to 6 am. From Siliguri, shared and non-shared taxis operate directly for Mane Bhanjyang. One can also avail taxis from Siliguri and Darjeeling, which travel via Maney Bhanjyang. While travelling from Siliguri, it is convenient to take taxis from Siliguri to Sukhia Pokhri which is about 2 1/2 hours ride, then more half an hour taxi ride from Sukhia Pokhri to Maney Bhanjyang. Another option is to take a vehicle en route to Darjeeling and drop down at Ghoom. Conveyance is available from Ghoom to Sukhiapokhri and then from Sukhiapokhri to Maney Bhanjyang.

Maney Bhanjyang is the base camp for trekkers heading toward Sandakphu and Phalut. All required accessories and stuffs required for the 2–4-day trek is available here. The famous Rhododendron trek and the Himalayan Run & Trek are organised from here.

== Education ==
Maney Bhanjyang has three schools in total. Maney Bhanjyang High School has classes from Grade V to Grade X and is upgrade to higher secondary school up to Grade XII. The course curriculum followed is that of the West Bengal Board of Secondary Education. Other schools are Rhododendron Integratus Boarding School and R.C. Mission Primary School which are primary schools that teach from the kindergarten level to Grade V.
