= Singalila Ridge =

Coordinates: 27.2443°N 88.0414°E

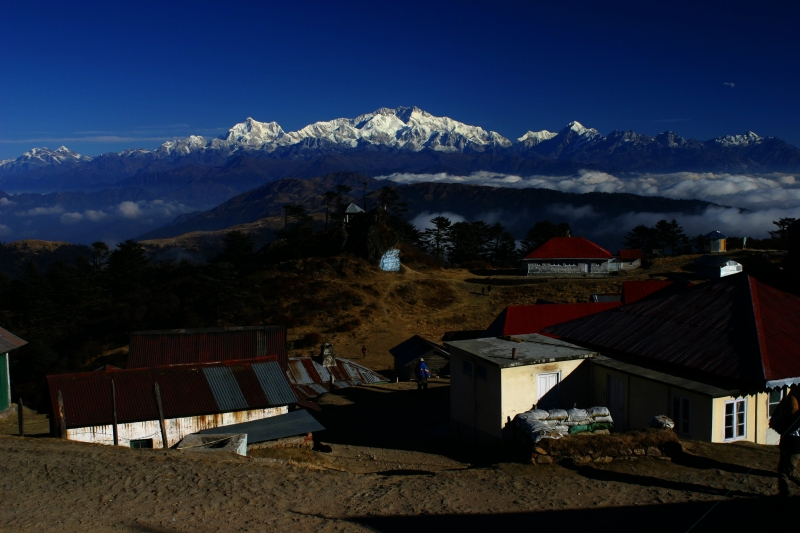

Highest point
- Elevation: 3,636 m (11,929 ft)
- Parent peak: Sandakphu

Geography
- Location within India Location within Nepal
- Location: Darjeeling district, West Bengal, India

Geology
- Mountain type: Mountain ridge

Singalila Ridge is a prominent north–south Himalayan ridge extending from the Darjeeling hills of northwestern West Bengal into western Sikkim in northeastern India, with its western slopes descending into the Ilam District of eastern Nepal. The ridge forms a natural divide between the lower ranges of the Darjeeling Himalayas and the higher Himalayan massifs to the west, and is noted for its extensive high-elevation forests, biodiversity and long-distance trekking routes.

The two highest summits of West Bengal, Sandakphu at 3,636 m (11,929 ft) and Phalut at 3,600 m (11,800 ft), lie along the ridge and offer panoramic views of Kangchenjunga and, on clear days, distant views of Mount Everest. Much of the ridge is protected within the Singalila National Park, a major conservation area known for its rhododendron forests, red panda habitat and alpine landscapes.

The ridge is a well-known trekking destination, with routes connecting Manebhanjan, Sandakphu, Phalut and the highlands of western Sikkim. Additional high-elevation passes such as the Singalila Pass link the ridge to remote border regions near Nepal and Sikkim, forming part of a larger trans-Himalayan trail network.

== Singalila Pass ==
Singalila Pass is a high‑elevation mountain pass located near Uttarey in western Sikkim, forming part of the northern extension of the Singalila Ridge. The pass lies close to the India–Nepal border at an elevation of about 3,300 m (10,800 ft), and serves as an important link between the upper Sikkim highlands and the eastern regions of Ilam District in Nepal.

The pass provides access to several trekking routes, including trails leading toward Phoktey Dara, Kalijhar, and the northern sections of the Singalila Ridge. It is known for panoramic views of the Kangchenjunga massif and surrounding Himalayan peaks during clear weather.

Due to its proximity to the international boundary, Singalila Pass is monitored by the Sashastra Seema Bal (SSB). The area remains largely undeveloped, with limited seasonal tourism focused on high‑elevation trekking and nature observation. Alpine forests, rhododendron belts, and remote ridgeline landscapes characterize the terrain around the pass.
