= Yangwarak Rural Municipality =

Yangwarak ཡང་ཝ་རག ཡང་ཝ་རག་གྲོང་གསེབ་གྲོང་ཁྱེར།
- Rural Municipality
- Location in Province No. 1 Yangwarak (Nepal)
- Coordinates: 27.26°N 87.85°E
- Province: Province No. 1
- District: Panchthar
- Wards: 6
- Established: 10 March 2017

Government
  - Type: Rural Council
  - Chairperson: Mr. Lekhnath Ghimire (NCP)
  - Vice-chairperson: Mrs. Kamal Kumari Yonghang (NCP)

Area
  - Total: 208.63 km^{2} (80.55 sq mi)

Population (2011)
  - Total: 18,281
  - Density: 87.624/km^{2} (226.95/sq mi)
- Time zone: UTC+5:45 (Nepal Standard Time)
- Headquarter: Tharpu
- Website: official website

Yangwarak (Nepali: याङवरक गाउँपालिका) is a rural municipality (gaunpalika) out of seven rural municipality located in Panchthar District of Province No. 1 of Nepal. There are a total of 8 municipalities in Panchthar in which 1 is urban and 7 are rural.

According to Ministry of Federal Affairs and Local Developme Yangwarak has an area of 208.63 square kilometres (80.55 mi^{2}) and the total population of the municipality is 18281 as of Census of Nepal 2011.

Chyangthapu, Phalaicha, Oyam, Tharpu and Nagi which previously were all separate Village development committee merged to form this new local level body. Fulfilling the requirement of the new Constitution of Nepal 2015, Ministry of Federal Affairs and Local Development replaced all old VDCs and Municipalities into 753 new local level body (Municipality).

The rural municipality is divided into total 6 wards and the headquarter of this newly formed rural municipality is situated in Tharpu.
