= Tumwewa Rural Municipality =

Tumwewa तुम्बेवा गाउँपालिका
- Rural Municipality
- Location in Province No. 1 Tumwewa (Nepal)
- Coordinates: 26.99°N 87.55°E
- Province: Province No. 1
- District: Panchthar
- Wards: 5
- Established: 10 March 2017

Government
  - Type: Rural Council
  - Chairperson: Baburam Khadka (NC)
  - Vice-chairperson: khadga Sunder Sambahamphe (CPN)

Area
  - Total: 117.34 km^{2} (45.31 sq mi)

Population (2011)
  - Total: 13,419
  - Density: 114.36/km^{2} (296.19/sq mi)
- Time zone: UTC+5:45 (Nepal Standard Time)
- Headquarter: Mouwa
- Website: official website

Tumwewa (Nepali: तुम्बेवा गाउँपालिका) is a rural municipality (gaunpalika) out of seven rural municipality located in Panchthar District of Province No. 1 of Nepal. There are a total of 8 municipalities in Panchthar in which 1 is urban and 7 are rural.

According to Ministry of Federal Affairs and Local Developme Tumwewa has an area of 117.34 square kilometres (45.31 mi^{2}) and the total population of the municipality is 13419 as of Census of Nepal 2011.

Aangna, Olane, Hangum and Mauwa which previously were all separate Village development committee merged to form this new local level body. Fulfilling the requirement of the new Constitution of Nepal 2015, Ministry of Federal Affairs and Local Development replaced all old VDCs and Municipalities into 753 new local level body (Municipality).

The rural municipality is divided into total 5 wards and the headquarter of this newly formed rural municipality is situated in Mauwa.
