= Results of the 1999 Nepalese general election =

The results of the 1999 Nepalese general election.

== Ilam ==
1999 general election: Ilam-1
| Party | Candidate | Votes | % |
|---|---|---|---|
| Congress | 'Benup Raj Prasai | 18608 | 45.67 |
| CPN (UML) | Jhal Nath Khanal | 18502 | 45.41 |
| RPP | Ganesh Rasik Rai | 1919 | 4.71 |
| Independent | Dilip Kumar Rai | 496 | 1.22 |
| Janamukti | Megh Raj Limbu | 387 | 0.95 |
| Communist Party of Nepal (Marxist-Leninist) (1998) | Kedar Nath Bastola | 357 | 0.88 |
| RPP (Chand) | Rom Nath Acharya | 218 | 0.53 |
| CPN (Marxist) | Mukund Acharya | 181 | 0.44 |
| Independent | Loknath Bhardwaj Brahman | 40 | 0.10 |
| NMKP | Prem Bamjan | 36 | 0.09 |

1999 general election: Ilam-2
| Party | Candidate | Votes | % |
|---|---|---|---|
| CPN (UML) | Subash Nemwang | 17407 | 43.91 |
| Congress | Kul Bahadur Gurung | 15482 | 39.05 |
| Janamukti | Sarna Bahadur Pauthak | 3093 | 7.80 |
| RPP (Chand) | Padma Sundar Lawati | 1475 | 3.72 |
| Communist Party of Nepal (Marxist-Leninist) (1998) | Nobal K.M. Rai | 768 | 1.94 |
| Independent | Bir Bahadur Rai | 693 | 1.75 |
| RPP | Prem Lal Chaulagai | 540 | 1.36 |
| Janamukti Party Nepal | Nabin Limbu | 82 | 0.21 |
| Jana Congress | Ganesh Bahadur Tamang (Grangdan) | 68 | 0.17 |
| Independent | Shambhu Ram Dewan | 35 | 0.09 |

1999 general election: Ilam-3
| Party | Candidate | Votes | % |
|---|---|---|---|
| Congress | Keshab Thapa | 18339 | 45.85 |
| CPN (UML) | Agam Prasad Bantawa | 17707 | 44.27 |
| Independent | Gopal Gurung | 2321 | 5.80 |
| Communist Party of Nepal (Marxist-Leninist) (1998) | Dharma Prasad Uprety | 587 | 1.47 |
| RPP | Kalika Karki | 563 | 1.41 |
| RPP (Chand) | Dharma Raj Nemwang | 200 | 0.50 |
| CPN (Marxist) | Bhumi Prasad Dhungana | 175 | 0.44 |
| Janamukti | Lalit Bahadur Thebe | 105 | 0.26 |

== Jhapa ==
1999 general election: Jhapa-1
| Party | Candidate | Votes | % |
|---|---|---|---|
| Congress | Krishna Prasad Sitaula | 17561 | 36.92 |
| CPN (UML) | Narayan Rajbanshi | 15300 | 32.16 |
| RPP | Rejendra Prasad Lingden | 5625 | 11.82 |
| Janamukti | Gyan Bahadur Imbung (Limbu) | 2708 | 5.69 |
| Nepal Sadbhavana Party | Surya Narayan Ganesh | 2272 | 4.78 |
| Communist Party of Nepal (Marxist-Leninist) (1998) | Dilli Kumar Mainali | 2168 | 4.56 |
| Independent | Jagat Bahadur Shrestha | 1417 | 2.98 |
| RPP | Nanda Prasad Paudel | 379 | 0.80 |
| Samyukta Janamorcha | Lal Bahadur Kandangwa | 136 | 0.28 |

1999 general election: Jhapa-2
| Party | Candidate | Votes | % |
|---|---|---|---|
| CPN (UML) | K.P. Sharma Oli | 18909 | 35.65 |
| Congress | Giriraj Kumari Prasai | 18892 | 35.62 |
| Communist Party of Nepal (Marxist-Leninist) (1998) | C.P. Mainali | 10199 | 19.23 |
| Janamukti | Sanjuhang Palungwa Limbu | 2727 | 5.14 |
| RPP | Hari Nath Bastola | 1143 | 2.15 |
| RPP (Chand) | Jaya Narayan Dhungna | 534 | 1.01 |
| Independent | Buddhi Raj Samsohang | 361 | 0.68 |
| Independent | Tika Prasad Sapkota | 123 | 0.23 |
| Shivsena Nepal | Manita Karki | 94 | 0.18 |
| Independent | Prem Krishna Sharma Kafle | 32 | 0.06 |
| Independent | Bishnu Prasad Prasai | 16 | 0.23 |
| Independent | Nanda Prasad Giri | 14 | 0.03 |

1999 general election: Jhapa-3
| Party | Candidate | Votes | % |
|---|---|---|---|
| Congress | Narendra Bikram Nemwang | 18909 | 41.00 |
| CPN (UML) | Bishnu Prasad Prasai | 17657 | 34.42 |
| Communist Party of Nepal (Marxist-Leninist) (1998) | Pushpa Raj Pokhrel | 8219 | 16.02 |
| RPP | Kalyan Khadka | 1211 | 2.36 |
| Independent | Santi Lal Dhimal | 1098 | 2.14 |
| Nepal Sadbhavana Party | Jitan Rajbanshi | 750 | 1.46 |
| Janamukti | Bhakta Bahadur Limbu | 677 | 1.32 |
| RPP (Chand) | Rup Narayan Bhattarai | 377 | 0.73 |
| Independent | Radha Devi Chaulagain | 165 | 0.32 |
| Independent | Sarman Gurung | 677 | 0.13 |
| Shivsena Nepal | Rabindra Nath Karn | 39 | 0.08 |

1999 general election: Jhapa-4
| Party | Candidate | Votes | % |
|---|---|---|---|
| Congress | Chakra Prakash Bastola | 15670 | 33.06 |
| CPN (UML) | Yukta Prasad Vetwal | 15645 | 33.01 |
| Nepal Sadbhavana Party | Bistow Nath Singh Rajbanshi | 6748 | 14.24 |
| Communist Party of Nepal (Marxist-Leninist) (1998) | Radha Krishna Mainali | 5323 | 11.23 |
| RPP | Ram Kumar Singh Rajbanshi | 2106 | 4.44 |
| Janamukti | Dhan Bahadur Tamang | 1305 | 2.75 |
| RPP (Chand) | Sushil Kumar K.C. | 177 | 0.37 |
| Independent | Amrita (Kathayat) Basnet | 163 | 0.34 |
| Shivsena Nepal | Durjan Lal Rajbanshi | 78 | 0.16 |
| Nepal Samyabadi Party (MLM) | Lila Sitaula | 66 | 0.14 |
| Hariyali Nepal Party | Dilli Prasad Sitaula | 36 | 0.07 |
| Independent | Min Prasad Khatiwoda | 27 | 0.06 |

1999 general election: Jhapa-5
| Party | Candidate | Votes | % |
|---|---|---|---|
| CPN (UML) | Tara Sam Yongya | 19199 | 41.79 |
| Congress | Santosh Kumar Meinyngbo | 16651 | 36.24 |
| Nepal Sadbhavana Party | Nitya Nand Tajpuriya | 3492 | 7.60 |
| Janamukti | Chandra Prasad Yongya | 2491 | 5.42 |
| Communist Party of Nepal (Marxist-Leninist) (1998) | Jung Prasad Chemjong | 1896 | 4.13 |
| RPP | Luxmi Prasad Odari | 1557 | 3.39 |
| RPP (Chand) | Hemant Bahadur Bohara | 246 | 0.53 |
| Janamukti Party Nepal | Surya Prasad Rai | 243 | 0.53 |
| Samyukta Janamorcha | Radha Krishna Acharya | 167 | 0.36 |

1999 general election: Jhapa-6
| Party | Candidate | Votes | % |
|---|---|---|---|
| CPN (UML) | K.P. Sharma Oli | 23749 | 40.29 |
| Congress | Kasi Lal Tajpuriya | 19713 | 33.44 |
| RPP | Dilip Rai | 6724 | 11.41 |
| Communist Party of Nepal (Marxist-Leninist) (1998) | Devi Prasad Ojha | 3330 | 5.65 |
| Janamukti | Purna Bahadur Ingnam | 2852 | 4.84 |
| Nepal Sadbhavana Party | Durga Prasad Rajbanshi | 2071 | 3.51 |
| Janamukti Party Nepal | Arjun Dev Rai | 225 | 0.38 |
| Independent | Janak Bahadur Karki | 223 | 0.38 |
| Independent | Tanka Prasad Dhakal | 53 | 0.09 |

== Panchthar ==
1999 general election: Panchthar-1
| Party | Candidate | Votes | % |
|---|---|---|---|
| CPN (UML) | Basanta Kumar Nemwang | 17680 | 39.71 |
| Congress | Dipak Prakash Baskota | 15191 | 34.12 |
| RPP (Chand) | Bam Bahadur Yongya | 7882 | 17.70 |
| RPP | Man Bahadur Jabegu | 1933 | 4.34 |
| Communist Party of Nepal (Marxist-Leninist) (1998) | Bhupendra Nemwang | 669 | 1.50 |
| Janamukti | Amber Bahadur Tawa | 593 | 1.33 |
| Independent | Bir Bikram Limbu (Thamsuhang) | 257 | 0.58 |
| Independent | Dewan Dorje Thing | 210 | 0.47 |
| Samyukta Janamorcha | Devi Prasad Thapa Magar | 107 | 0.24 |

1999 general election: Panchthar-2
| Party | Candidate | Votes | % |
|---|---|---|---|
| CPN (UML) | Damber Singh Sambahamphe | 15409 | 33.77 |
| Congress | Vishma Raj Aangdembe | 13259 | 29.75 |
| RPP (Chand) | Padam Sundar Lawati | 12422 | 27.88 |
| Janamukti | Ram Kumar Sambahamphe | 1453 | 3.26 |
| RPP | Nara Bahadur Sherma | 1318 | 2.96 |
| Communist Party of Nepal (Marxist-Leninist) (1998) | Birendra Kumar Shrestha | 701 | 1.57 |
| Samyukta Janamorcha | Bishnua Kumar Rai | 198 | 0.44 |
| Independent | Buddha Maya Makhim | 85 | 0.19 |
| Janamukti Party Nepal | Surya Prasad Sambahamphe | 75 | 0.17 |

== Taplejung ==
1999 general election: Taplejung-1
| Party | Candidate | Votes | % |
|---|---|---|---|
| CPN (UML) | Til Kumar Menyangbo Limbu | 13636 | 42,46 |
| Congress | Surya Man Gurung | 13472 | 41.95 |
| Janamukti | Padam Bahadur Yengden | 1786 | 5.56 |
| RPP | Kedar Nath Dahal | 1502 | 4.68 |
| Communist Party of Nepal (Marxist-Leninist) (1998) | Kul Prasad Uprety | 1289 | 4.01 |
| Independent | Ram Bahadur Thebe | 427 | 1.33 |

1999 general election: Taplejung-2
| Party | Candidate | Votes | % |
|---|---|---|---|
| CPN (UML) | Om Prasad Ojha | 10402 | 37.57 |
| RPP | Bishnu Maden | 8420 | 30.41 |
| Congress | Pratap Prakash Hangam | 6247 | 22.56 |
| Janamukti | Birendra Bahadur Limbu (Ambuhang) | 1875 | 6.77 |
| Communist Party of Nepal (Marxist-Leninist) (1998) | Tej Bahadur (Yakso) Limbu | 693 | 2.50 |
| Independent | Goma Chandal | 49 | 0.17 |
