= National Highway 06 (Nepal) =

Highway in Nepal

Tamor Corridor तमोर करिडोर
- राष्ट्रिय राजमार्ग ०६
- National Highway 06
- Tamor Corridor (NH06) in red

Route information
- Maintained by MoPIT (Department of Roads)
- Length: 145 km (90 mi)
- History: Under construction

Major junctions
- West end: Chatara
- Mulghat (Dhankuta), Majhitar, Phidim Municipality (Panchthar), Ganesh Chowk (Panchthar)
- East end: Ganesh Chowk

Location
- Country: Nepal
- Provinces: Koshi Province
- District: Sunsari, Dhankuta, Tehrathum, Panchthar

Highway system
- Roads in Nepal
← NH05	→ NH07

NH06 or Tamor Corridor (Nepali: तमोर करिडोर) is a National Highway of Nepal that connects Terai in Sunsari District to Hills in Panchthar District in Koshi Province. It runs parallel of Tamur River via Sunsari District, Dhankuta District, Tehrathum District and Panchthar District. It starts from Tribeni (Chatara) of Barahakshetra Municipality in Sunsari and ends at Ambarpur (ward no. 1) of Hilihang Rural Municipality in Panchthar District. The total length of the road is 145 kilometres (90 mi).

NH-06 (Tamor Corridor) merges with NH09 (Madan Bhandari Inner Terai Highway) at Chatara, it crosses NH08 (Koshi Highway) at Mulghat, it again crosses NH03 (Pushpalal Highway) at Majhitar and finalize merging with NH02 (Mechi Highway) about 2.5 km before Ganesh Chowk in Hilihang, Panchthar.

== See also ==
- Roads in Nepal

== Links ==
- SNH 2020-2021
