= Yasok =

Yasok यासोक Yasok Panchthar
- Previous Village development committee, Before 2073 Falgun
- Location in Nepal
- Coordinates: 27.05°N 87.63°E
- Country: Nepal
- Zone: Mechi Zone
- District: Panchthar District

Population (2011)2068 BS
  - Total: 4,224
- Time zone: UTC+5:45 (Nepal Time)
- Postal code: 57408
- Area code: 024
- Website: https://www.facebook.com/mechi.panchthar

Yasok is city of Panchthar district. Yasok is the headquarters of Kummayak gaunpalika [rural municipality]. Yasok is also known as Yasok Bazar. Yasok was a village development committee in Panchthar District in Mechi Zone of Limbuwan in Nepal, before 2073 Falgun. Now Yashok is merged with Rani Gaun, Syabarumba, Mangjabung to form Kummayak Gaunpalika. Now Yasok vdc is converted to Kummayak ward no 1. Recently at the time of 2011 Nepal Census it had a total population of 4424 people living 947 individual households where 1952 are male and 2972 are females. In this village development committee 90% of its population are Indigenous Limbu people and rest are others. Kirat is the main religion of those indigenous people. Yasok is Area no 2 of Panchthar District Election committee. Bhishma Raj Angdembe was the winner from this Area on second election of Constituent Assembly. In this village development there are nine Primary Level government and public schools, one private English school, two secondary schools, one higher secondary school and one graduate campus. There are Two locally well-known Kirati temples called Kummayak and Kusayak. In those temple, every three years thousands of pilgrims came to worship. Most of the people's livelihood depend on the seasonal agricultural and now they started farming cash crops and increasing their livelihood stranded. The situation of the people in this place is very poor. Road system is poor, shortage of drinking and poor infrastructures are the main problem in this village development committee.
