= Hilihang Rural Municipality =

Hilihang हिलिहाङ गाउँपालिका
- Rural Municipality
- Location in Province No. 1 Hilihang (Nepal)
- Coordinates: 27.24°N 87.78°E
- Province: Province No. 1
- District: Panchthar
- Wards: 7
- Established: 10 March 2017

Government
  - Type: Rural Council
  - Chairperson: Mr. Bhuwaniprasad Lingden (NCP)
  - Vice-chairperson: Mrs. Sumitra Upreti Sedhai (NCP)

Area
  - Total: 123.01 km^{2} (47.49 sq mi)

Population (2011)
  - Total: 22,913
  - Density: 186.27/km^{2} (482.44/sq mi)
- Time zone: UTC+5:45 (Nepal Standard Time)
- Headquarter: Panchami
- Website: official website

Hilihang (Nepali: हिलिहाङ गाउँपालिका) is a rural municipality (gaunpalika) in the Panchthar District of Province No. 1, in Nepal. There are a total of 8 municipalities in Panchthar of which 1 is urban and 7 are rural.

According to the Ministry of Federal Affairs and Local Development Hilihang has an area of 123 square kilometres (47 mi^{2}) and the total population of the municipality is 22913 as of the Census of Nepal 2011.

Ambarpur, Panchami, Subhang and Bharapa, which previously were all separate Village development committees, merged to form this new local level body. This was a requirement of the 2015 Constitution of Nepal under which the Ministry of Federal Affairs and Local Development merged all old VDCs and Municipalities into 753 new local level bodies.

The rural municipality is divided into seven wards. Its headquarters is in Panchami.
