= Raj Kishor Mahato =

Nepalese politician

Honourable Raj Kishor Mahato
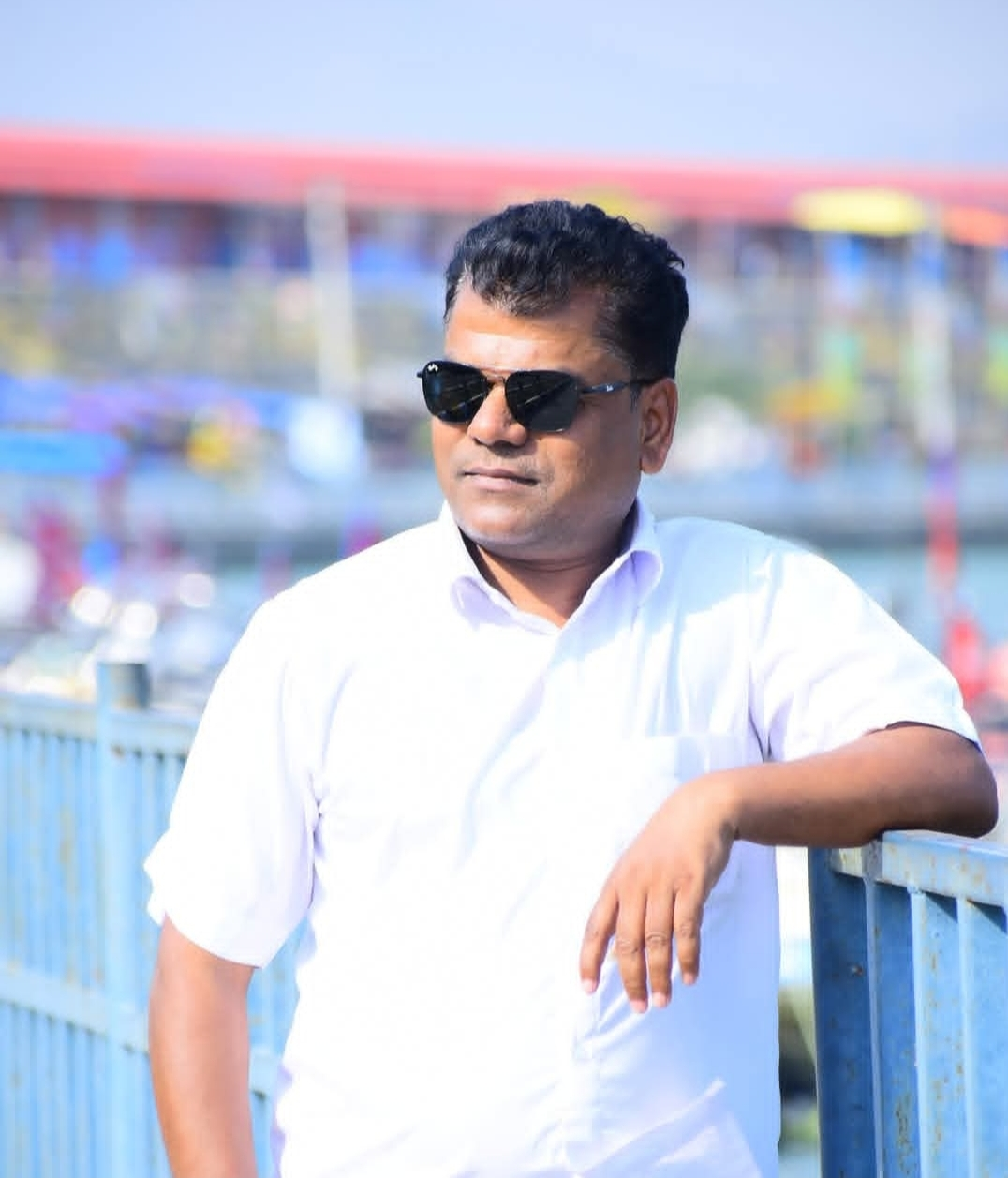

Member of Parliament, Pratinidhi Sabha
- Preceded by: Raghubir Mahaseth
- Constituency: Dhanusha 4

Personal details
- Born: 27 April 1974 (age 52) Bateshwar, Dhanusha District, Madhesh Province, Nepal
- Party: Rastriya Swatantra Party
- Parent: Badri Mahato (father)
- Occupation: Politician

Raj Kishor Mahato (Nepali: राजकिशोर महतो) is a Nepalese politician, former teacher, managing director and currently a member of Pratinidhi Sabha from Rastriya Swatantra Party. He entered into politics in 2017, taking a general membership of then Federal Socialist Forum, Nepal and contested in 2017 Nepal province election from Dhanusha 4(B), but lost to Satrudhan Mahato of CPN (Unified Marxist–Leninist), He belongs to the kushwaha(koiri) caste of Nepal.

He joined the Rastriya Swatantra Party in 2026 and secured a party ticket to contest 2026 general election from Dhanusha 4.

In the 2026 general election, he won from Dhanusha 4 with 48,270 votes, defeating Mahendra Yadav of the Nepali Congress, former minister and Raghubir Mahaseth, seating MP and former deputy prime minister of the CPN (Unified Marxist–Leninist).

== Early life ==
Mahato was born in Bateshwar, Dhanusha District on 27 April 1974.

== Career ==
Mahato is the managing director of Wave Pharma Chemicals Private Limited. He started his professional career at Buddha Secondary School, Solukhumbu as a mathematics and science teacher. He left teaching profession in the next four years and started working as Medical salesman for a decade.

== Electoral performance ==
Election	Year	Constituency	Contested for	Political party	Result	Votes	% of votes
Nepal province election	2017	Dhanusha 4(B)	Pradesh Sabha member	Federal Socialist Forum, Nepal	Lost	7,940	24.07%
Nepal general election	2026	Dhanusha 4	Pratinidhi Sabha member	Rastriya Swatantra Party	Won	48,270	60.98%
