= Kummayak Rural Municipality =

Kummayak कुम्मायक Kummayak Panchthar
- Rural Municipality of Panchthar
- Location in Nepal
- Coordinates: 27.05°N 87.63°E
- Country: Nepal
- Zone: Mechi Zone
- District: Panchthar District
- Headquarters: Yasok

Government
  - Chairperson: Mr. Jaya Bahadur Chemjong (NCP)
  - Vice-chairperson: Mrs. Sita Acharya (NCP)

Area
  - Total: 129.30 km^{2} (49.92 sq mi)

Population (2011)2068 BS
  - Total: 16,118
  - Density: 124.66/km^{2} (322.86/sq mi)
- Time zone: UTC+5:45 (Nepal Time)
- Postal code: 57408
- Area code: 024
- Website: official website

Kummayak (Nepali: कुम्मायक गाउपालिका) is a rural municipality in Panchthar district. Kummayak is formed by the merging of Yasok, Rani Gaun, Syangrumba and Mangjabung village development committees. Kummayak covers 129.30 km^{2} area with 16118 total population.
