= Narendra Kumar Kerung =

Nepalese politician

- नरेन्द्रकुमार केरुङ

Member of the House of Representatives
- Incumbent
- Assumed office 26 march 2026
- Prime Minister: Balen Shah
- Preceded by: Basanta Kumar Nemwang
- Constituency: Panchthar 1

Personal details
- Born: 6 December 1972 (age 53)
- Party: Nepali Congress

Narendra Kumar Kerung (Nepali: नरेन्द्रकुमार केरुङ; born 6 Dec 1972) is a Nepalese politician and a member of the Nepali Congress. He was elected to the House of Representatives from the Panchthar 1 and serves as a member of the 7th House of Representatives.

In 2026 Kerung won the election from Panchthar 1 defeating Hastaraj Sherma of Shram Sanskriti Party by 2,499 votes margin. In 1 june 2026 he was appointed as member of the Parliamentary Monitoring Committee of Bhishma Raj Angdembe to oversee finance.
