= Chokmagu =

Chokmagu चोकमागु
- Location in Nepal
- Coordinates: 27.13°N 87.74°E
- Country: Nepal
- Province: Province No. 1
- District: Panchthar District

Population (1991)
  - Total: 5,698
- Time zone: UTC+5:45 (Nepal Time)

Chokmagu is a market center of Phidim Municipality in Panchthar District in the Province No. 1 in eastern Nepal. It was annexed to Phidim on 18 May 2014 to form the municipality. At the time of the 1991 Nepal census it had a population of 5698 people living in 835 individual households.
