= Oyam =

Oyam may refer to:

- Oyam, Gabon
- Oyam, Panchthar, a Village Development Committee in Nepal
- Oyam District, a district in northern Uganda
- Oyam, Uganda, the 'chief town' and administrative headquarters of Oyam District
