= Dhanusha 4 =

Parliamentary constituency in Madhesh Province, Nepal

- Parliamentary constituency
- Dhanusha 4 in Madhesh Province
- Province: Madhesh Province
- District: Dhanusha District
- Electorate: 127,778

Current constituency
- Created: 1991
- Party: Rastriya Swatantra Party
- Member of Parliament: Raj Kishor Mahato

Dhanusha 4 is one of four parliamentary constituencies of Dhanusha District in Nepal. This constituency came into existence on the Constituency Delimitation Commission (CDC) report submitted on 31 August 2017.

== Incorporated areas ==
Dhanusha 4 incorporates Bateshwar Rural Municipality, Lakshminya Rural Municipality, wards 1–3 and 5-11 of Mithila Municipality. 1-7 and 10 of Chhireshwarnath Municipality, wards 2 and 6–10 of Mithila Bihari Municipality and wards 9, 13, 14, 19, 21 and 22 of Janakpur Sub-metropolitan City.

== Assembly segments ==
It encompasses the following Madhesh Provincial Assembly segment

- Dhanusha 4(A)
- Dhanusha 4(B)

== Members of Parliament ==
=== Parliament/Constituent Assembly ===
Election	Member	Party
1991	Ananda Prasad Dhungana	Nepali Congress
1994	Bimalendra Nidhi	Nepali Congress
1999	Krishna Pratap Malla	Rastriya Prajatantra Party
2008	Sanjay Kumar Sah	Madhesi Janadhikar Forum, Nepal
June 2009	Sanjay Kumar Sah	Madhesi Janadhikar Forum, Nepal (Democratic)
2013	Sanjay Kumar Sah	Sadbhavana Party
April 2017	Sanjay Kumar Sah	Rastriya Janata Party Nepal
2017	Raghubir Mahaseth	CPN (Unified Marxist–Leninist)
May 2018	Raghubir Mahaseth	Nepal Communist Party
2022	Raghubir Mahaseth	CPN (Unified Marxist–Leninist)
2026	Raj Kishor Mahato	Rastriya Swatantra Party

=== Provincial Assembly ===
==== 4(A ====
Election	Member	Party
2017	Gyanendra Kumar Yadav	Federal Socialist Forum, Nepal
May 2019	Gyanendra Kumar Yadav	Samajbadi Party, Nepal
April 2020	Gyanendra Kumar Yadav	People's Socialist Party, Nepal

==== 4(B) ====
Election	Member	Party
2017	Satrudhan Mahato	CPN (Unified Marxist-Leninist)
May 2018	Satrudhan Mahato	Nepal Communist Party
March 2021	Satrudhan Mahato	CPN (Unified Marxist–Leninist)
August 2021	Satrudhan Mahato	CPN (Unified Socialist)

== Election results ==
=== Election in the 2020s ===
==== 2026 general election ====
Candidate	Party	Votes	%	+/–
Raj Kishor Mahato	Rastriya Swatantra Party	48,270	60.98	▲59.52
Mahendra Yadav	Nepali Congress	15,809	19.97	▼21.86
Raghubir Mahaseth	CPN (UML)	11,529	14.56	▼27.43
Sanjay Kumar Mahato	Nepali Communist Party	1,336	1.69	New entry
Indrajeet Kumar Yadav	Janamat Party	568	0.72	
Krishna Chandra Prasad Sah	Janata Samajbadi Party, Nepal	516	0.65	▼6.14
Others		1,128	1.43	
Total		79,156	100.00	–
Valid votes		79,156	94.27	
Invalid/blank votes		4,811	5.73	
Total votes		83,967	100.00	
Registered voters/turnout		127,778	65.71	
Majority		32,461		
Rastriya Swatantra Party gain				

==== 2022 general election ====
Candidate	Party	Votes	%
Raghubir Mahaseth	CPN (UML)	32,236	41.99
Mahendra Yadav	Nepali Congress	32,112	41.83
Mahajan Yadav	People's Socialist Party, Nepal	5,212	6.79
Krishna Kumar Mahato	Independent	4,343	5.66
Sanjay Kumar Yadav	Rastriya Swatantra Party	1,121	1.46
Others		1,744	2.27
Total		76,768	100.00
Valid votes		76,768	93.03
Invalid/blank votes		5,754	6.97
Total votes		82,522	100.00
Registered voters/turnout		116,742	70.69
Majority		124	
CPN (UML) hold			

=== Election in the 2010s ===
==== 2017 legislative elections ====
Candidate	Party	Votes	%
Raghubir Mahaseth	CPN (UML)	22,532	35.51
Mahendra Yadav	Nepali Congress	19,991	31.50
Mahajan Yadav	People's Socialist Party, Nepal	19,662	30.99
Others		1,271	2.00
Total		63,456	100.00
Valid votes		63,456	94.26
Invalid/blank votes		3,861	5.74
Total votes		67,317	100.00
Majority		2,541	
CPN (UML) gain			

==== 2017 Nepalese provincial elections ====
===== 4(A) =====
Party	Candidate	Votes
Federal Socialist Forum, Nepal	Gyanendra Kumar Yadav	14,606
Nepali Congress	Dr. Chandra Mohan Yadav	7,973
CPN (Unified Marxist–Leninist)	Babu Saheb Yadav	7,763
Others		883
Invalid votes		1,425
Result	FSFN gain	
Source: Election Commission

===== 4(B) =====
Party	Candidate	Votes
CPN (Unified Marxist-Leninist)	Satrudhan Mahato	12,800
Nepali Congress	Basulal Mahato Koiri	11,549
Raj Kishore Mahato	Federal Socialist Forum, Nepal	7,940
Others		693
Invalid votes		1,597
Result	CPN (UML) gain	
Source: Election Commission

==== 2013 Constituent Assembly election ====
Party	Candidate	Votes
Sadbhavana Party	Sanjay Kumar Sah	12,666
Nepali Congress	Ram Saroj Yadav	11,426
Terai Madhes Loktantrik Party	Brishesh Chandra Lal	2,650
CPN (Unified Marxist–Leninist)	Shri Prasad Sah	2,072
UCPN (Maoist)	Arbind Sah	1,114
Others		5,843
Result	Sadhavana gain	
Source: NepalNews

=== Election in the 2000s ===
==== 2008 Constituent Assembly election ====
Party	Candidate	Votes
Madhesi Janadhikar Forum, Nepal	Sanjay Kumar Sah	13,422
CPN (Unified Marxist–Leninist)	Raghubir Mahaseth	9,282
Terai Madhes Loktantrik Party	Brishesh Chandra Lal	4,965
Nepali Congress	Lila Koirala	4,363
CPN (Maoist)	Arbind Kumar Lal Karna	1,847
Sadbhavana Party	Ram Dayal Sah	1,344
Others		3,197
Invalid votes		2,941
Result	Forum Nepal gain	
Source: Election Commission

=== Election in the 1990s ===
==== 1999 legislative elections ====
Party	Candidate	Votes
Rastriya Prajatantra Party	Krishna Pratap Malla	24,293
Nepali Congress	Bimalendra Nidhi	19,053
CPN (Unified Marxist–Leninist)	Ram Aashis Mahaseth	5,553
Others		2,914
Invalid Votes		747
Result	RPP gain	
Source: Election Commission

==== 1994 legislative elections ====
Party	Candidate	Votes
Nepali Congress	Bimalendra Nidhi	21,340
Rastriya Prajatantra Party	Krishna Pratap Malla	16,563
Result	Congress gain	
Source: Election Commission

==== 1991 legislative elections ====
Party	Candidate	Votes
Nepali Congress	Mahendra Narayan Nidhi	25,852
CPN (Democratic)	Ramashesh Mahaseth	8,434
Result	Congress gain	

== See also ==
- List of parliamentary constituencies of Nepal
