= Languages with official status in Nepal =

Languages of Nepal in official status

The Constitution of Nepal recognizes all mother tongues as national languages of Nepal.

== History ==
The first legislation of Nepal Muluki Ain of 1854 (1910 B.S.) recognized Gorkha Bhasa, now known as Nepali language, as the only official working language of Nepal. The Constitution of the Kingdom of Nepal of 1959 (2015 B.S.) recognized Nepali language as the sole official and national language. The Interim Constitution of Nepal of 2007 (2063 B.S.) recognized Nepal as a multi-lingual country, providing the status of national languages to all mother tongues in Nepal. However, it also continued Nepali language as the sole official language.

== Constitution ==
The 2015 Constitution of Nepal (2072 B.S.) provisions as follows in the official language.

- Article 6: All native languages spoken in Nepal are National languages of Nepal.
- Article 7a: The Nepali language in Devanagari script is used for Nepal government work.
- Article 7b: Beside Nepali, the provinces can choose one or more other languages spoken by majority population of that province for government work.

== Federal level ==
According to the constitutional provision, Nepali written in the Devanagari script is the official working language at the federal level. Within the Federal Parliament of Nepal use of mother tongue is practiced. The House of Representatives Regulations, 2018 and National Assembly Regulations, 2018 provisions that members can speak in their mother tongue and it can be documented. In 2018, parliamentarians took oath in their mother language, however they had to apply three days before the first meeting of the House of Representatives. Similarly, the Ordinance Regarding Oath Taking, 2020 provisions that anyone who holds a public post can take oath in a mother tongue spoken in Nepal, however for anyone to take oath in any language apart from Nepali - they have to translate the oath format themselves and pre-inform to oath officer.

== Province level ==
Fourteen languages are recommended to have official status in provincial level.

List of official languages in provinces of Nepal
State	Official Languages
Koshi Province	Maithili, Limbu
Madhesh Province	Maithili, Bhojpuri, Bajjika
Bagmati Province	Tamang, Nepal Bhasa
Gandaki Province	Magar, Gurung
Lumbini Province	Tharu, Awadhi
Sudurpashchim Province	Tharu, Dotyali
Karnali Province	Nepali language (Karnali dialect), Magar

== Local level ==
There is no constitutional provision about official languages in local level. However, local levels have taken their own initiatives to determine their official languages. The Language Commission has mentioned in its report that the constitution has given it right to determine linguistic provisions in the country and therefore recommended official languages at local levels.

=== Province no.1 ===
Official language in local levels in Koshi Province
No.	Local level	Official language(s)
1	Chulachuli Rural Municipality	Limbu
2	Halesi Tuwachung Municipality	Chamling, Wambule, Tilung
3	Mangsebung Rural Municipality	Limbu
4	Phalgunanda Rural Municipality	Limbu

=== Bagmati Province ===
Official language in local levels in Bagmati Province
No.	Local level	Official language(s)
1	Kathmandu Metropolitan City	Nepal Bhasa
2	Kirtipur Municipality	Nepal Bhasa
3	Lalitpur Metropolitan City	Nepal Bhasa

=== Lumbini Province ===
Official language in local levels in Lumbini Province
No.	Local level	Official language(s)
1	Ghorahi Sub-metropolitan City	Tharu

== See also ==
- Languages of Nepal
- Ethnic groups in Nepal
