= Shesh Narayan Yadav =

Nepalese politician

Honourable Shesh Narayan Yadav
- शेषनारायण यादव

Minister for Energy, Irrigation and Water Supply of Madhesh Province
- Incumbent
- Assumed office 18 July 2024
- Chief Minister: Satish Kumar Singh

Provincial Assembly Member of Madhesh Province
- Incumbent
- Assumed office 2022
- Preceded by: Gyanendra Kumar Yadav
- Constituency: Dhanusha 4(A)

Personal details
- Party: Nepali Congress
- Occupation: Politician

Shesh Narayan Yadav (Nepali: शेषनारायण यादव) is a Nepalese politician belonging to Nepali Congress and the current Minister of Energy, Irrigation and Water Supply of Madhesh Province.

Yadav is a member of Provincial Assembly of Madhesh Province. He was elected via 2022 Nepalese provincial elections from Dhanusha 4(A).

== Electoral history ==
=== 2022 Madhesh Provincial Assembly election ===
Dhanusha 4(A)
Party	Candidate	Votes
Nepali Congress	Shesh Narayan Yadav	14,055
CPN (UML)	Santosh Kumar Yadav	12,606
People's Socialist Party Nepal	Gyanendra Kumar Yadav	8,196
Result	Congress gain	
Source: Election Commission
