= Singhalila FM =

Sinhgalila FM
Panchthar, Nepal; Nepal
- Frequency: 97.3 MHz

Programming
- Language: Nepali

History
- First air date: 2009

Links
- Website: singhalilafm.com

Singhalila FM (Nepali: सिंगलिला एफ. एम.) or Radio Singhalila is a community FM station transmitted on 97.3 MHz which broadcasts from Phidim-1, Panchthar.

In the media hub it is working actively to make the service available everywhere to each corner and remote area of the district as well as outside district. It has short wave transmission ability from which it could have succeeded to delivery the service to most of the areas of neighboring district – Tehrathum Taplejung, Ilam, etc. It is about to turn 5 years of established time and it has been airing various programs. This FM is covering roughly about 3 to 4 mile distances by delivering the proper service for 200,000 people around its areas. It has no sister station like other radio stations. It is popular for broadcasting musical programs.

Its slogan is We are included in Multi castes, multi linguistics by travelling Plain, hill, and mountain regions. It is aiming at raising the lost culture, language and making all peoples aware about their duties about one's community. It is situated on hilly land and its station is also on hilltop so the broadcast coverage is greater.

== Programs ==
- Musical Zoom
- Good night wishes
- News
- Best wishes in the morning time.

== Journalists ==
- Sarala Regmi Nepal (Program presenter)
- Meena (News teller and program presenter)
- Chhabi (God night wishes presenter)
- Aaita Maya Limbu (Technical supporter)
