= Miklajung =

Miklajung may refer to:

- Miklajung, Morang, a rural municipality in Morang
- Miklajung, Panchthar, a rural municipality in Panchthar
