= Panchthar 1 =

Parliamentary constituency in Nepal

- Parliamentary constituency
- Pancthar 1 in Koshi Province
- Province: Koshi Province
- District: Panchthar District

Current constituency
- Created: 1991
- Member: Narendra Kumar Kerung (Congress)
- Member of the Provincial Assembly: Ganesh Kumar Kumbang, CPN (US)
- Member of the Provincial Assembly: Indra Bahadur Angbo, CPN (US)

Panchthar 1 is the parliamentary constituency of Panchthar District in Nepal. This constituency came into existence on the Constituency Delimitation Commission (CDC) report submitted on 31 August 2017.

== Incorporated areas ==
Panchthar 1 incorporates the entirety of Panchthar District.

== Assembly segments ==
It encompasses the following Province No. 1 Provincial Assembly segment

- Panchthar 1(A)
- Panchthar 1(B)

== Members of Parliament ==
=== Parliament/Constituent Assembly ===
Election	Member	Party
1991	Basanta Kumar Nemwang	CPN (Unified Marxist–Leninist)
1994	Dipak Prakash Baskota	Nepali Congress
1999	Basanta Kumar Nemwang	CPN (Unified Marxist–Leninist)
2008	Purna Kumar Sharma	Nepali Congress
2013	Ganesh Kumar Kambang	CPN (Unified Marxist–Leninist)
2017	Basanta Kumar Nemwang	CPN (Unified Marxist–Leninist)
May 2018	Basanta Kumar Nemwang	Nepal Communist Party
March 2021	Basanta Kumar Nemwang	CPN (Unified Marxist–Leninist)
2022	Basanta Kumar Nemwang	CPN (Unified Marxist–Leninist)
2026	Narendra Kumar Kerung	Nepali Congress

=== Provincial Assembly ===
==== 1(A) ====
Election	Member	Party
2017	Ganesh Kumar Kambang	CPN (Unified Marxist-Leninist)
May 2018	Ganesh Kumar Kambang	Nepal Communist Party
March 2021	Ganesh Kumar Kambang	CPN (Unified Marxist–Leninist)
August 2021	Ganesh Kumar Kambang	CPN (Unified Socialist)

==== 1(B) ====
Election	Member	Party
2017	Indra Bahadur Angbo	CPN (Maoist Centre)
May 2018	Indra Bahadur Angbo	Nepal Communist Party
March 2021	Indra Bahadur Angbo	CPN (Maoist Centre)

== Election results ==
=== Election in the 2020s ===
==== 2026 general election ====
Candidate	Party	Votes	%
Narendra Kumar Kerung	Nepali Congress	17,233	25.75
Hasta Raj Sherma	Shram Sanskriti Party	14,734	22.02
Aindra Sundar Nembang	CPN (UML)	14,534	21.72
Harka Bahadur Nembang	Nepali Communist Party	11,443	17.10
Mahendra Bikram Thamsuhang	Rastriya Swatantra Party	4,197	6.27
Tekbahadur Subba	Rastriya Pariwartan Party	2,825	4.22
Others		1,955	2.92
Total		66,921	100.00
Majority		2,499	
Nepali Congress gain			

==== 2022 general election ====
Candidate	Party	Votes	%
Basanta Kumar Nemwang	CPN (UML)	32,135	45.39
Bishma Raj Aangdembe	Nepali Congress	32,089	45.33
Kamal Bahadur Chemjong	Rastriya Prajatantra Party	1,578	2.23
Prem Raj Lawati	People's Socialist Party, Nepal	1,274	1.80
Jas Bahadur Yonghang	Sanghiya Loktantrik Rastriya Manch	1,011	1.43
Others		2,704	3.82
Total		70,791	100.00
Majority		46	
CPN (UML) hold			

==== 2022 provincial election ====
===== 1(A) =====
Candidate	Party	Votes	%
Kamal Prasad Jabegu	CPN (Unified Socialist)	16,849	43.62
Raj Kumar Bhandari	CPN (UML)	16,215	41.98
Sagar Kerung	Sanghiya Loktantrik Rastriya Manch	1,636	4.24
Omnath Bajgain	Rastriya Prajatantra Party	1,325	3.43
Machindra Prasad Begha	People's Socialist Party	942	2.44
Others	1,659	4.30	
Total		38,626	100.00
Majority		634	
CPN (Unified Socialist)			

===== 1(B) =====
Candidate	Party	Votes	%
Indra Bahadur Angbo	CPN (Maoist Centre)	15,685	47.32
Aindra Sundar Nembang	CPN (UML)	12,609	38.04
Sagun Sundar Lawati	Rastriya Prajatantra Party	1,768	5.33
Abiraj Angdembe	People's Socialist Party	1,175	3.54
Dipendra Chemjong	Sanghiya Loktantrik Rastriya Manch	1,126	3.40
Others	786	2.37	
Total		33,149	100.00
Majority		3,076	
CPN (Maoist Centre)			

=== Election in the 2010s ===
==== 2017 legislative elections ====
Candidate	Party	Votes	%
Basanta Kumar Nemwang	CPN (UML)	38,641	53.53
Bishma Raj Aangdembe	Nepali Congress	28,025	38.83
Prem Raj Lawati	Federal Socialist Forum, Nepal	1,994	2.76
Sagar Kerung	Sanghiya Loktantrik Rastriya Manch	1,593	2.21
Others		1,929	2.67
Total		72,182	100.00
Valid votes		72,182	92.64
Invalid/blank votes		5,731	7.36
Total votes		77,913	100.00
Registered voters/turnout		125,219	62.22
Majority		10,616	
CPN (UML) hold			

==== 2017 Nepalese provincial elections ====
===== 1(A) =====
Party	Candidate	Votes
CPN (Unified Marxist–Leninist)	Ganesh Kumar Kambang	21,010
Nepali Congress	Narendra Kumar Kerung	16,078
Others		2,320
Invalid votes		2,173
Result	CPN (UML) gain	
Source: Election Commission

===== 1(B) =====
Party	Candidate	Votes
CPN (Maoist Centre)	Indra Bahadur Angbo	16,908
Nepali Congress	Surendra Kumar Dahal	12,117
Federal Socialist Forum, Nepal	Yabiraj Angdembo	2,040
Sanghiya Loktantrik Rastriya Manch	Dipendra Chemjong	1,157
Others		1,455
Invalid votes		2,479
Result	Maoist Centre gain	
Source: Election Commission

==== 2013 Constituent Assembly election ====
Party	Candidate	Votes
CPN (Unified Marxist–Leninist)	Ganesh Kumar Kambang	13,082
Nepali Congress	Narendra Kumar Kerung	11,518
UCPN (Maoist)	Aindra Kumar Kerung	3,092
Rastriya Prajatantra Party Nepal	Sajung Shundar Lawati	1,589
Federal Socialist Party, Nepal	Rajendra Kumar Jawegu	1,445
Rastriya Prajatantra Party	Prem Raj Thamsuhang	1,103
Federal Limbuwan State Council	Surendra Prakash Jawegu	1,044
Others		1,539
Result	CPN (UML) gain	
Source: NepalNews

=== Election in the 2000s ===
==== 2008 Constituent Assembly election ====
Party	Candidate	Votes
Nepali Congress	Purna Kumar Sharma	12,920
CPN (Unified Marxist–Leninist)	Ganesh Kumar Kambang	12,913
CPN (Maoist)	Shri Prasad Jawegu	10,708
Sanghiya Loktantrik Rastriya Manch	Mitra Lingden	2,911
Rastriya Prajatantra Party	Man Bahadur Jawegu	1,670
CPN (Marxist–Leninist)	Yahang Bir Kerung	1,113
Others		561
Invalid votes		2,465
Result	Congress gain	
Source: Election Commission

=== Election in the 1990s ===
==== 1999 legislative elections ====
Party	Candidate	Votes
CPN (Unified Marxist–Leninist)	Basanta Kumar Nemwang	17,680
Nepali Congress	Dipak Prakash Baskota	15,191
Rastriya Prajatantra Party (Chand)	Bam Bahadur Yongya	7,882
Rastriya Prajatantra Party	Man Bahdur Jabegu	1,933
Others		1,836
Invalid Votes		762
Result	CPN (UML) gain	
Source: Election Commission

==== 1994 legislative elections ====
Party	Candidate	Votes
Nepali Congress	Dipak Prakash Baskota	13,949
CPN (Unified Marxist–Leninist)	Basanta Kumar Nemwang	12,989
Rastriya Prajatantra Party	Padma Sundar Lawati	11,487
Rastriya Janamukti Party	Lakshmi Prakash Tumwapo	920
Result	Congress gain	
Source: Election Commission

==== 1991 legislative elections ====
Party	Candidate	Votes
CPN (Unified Marxist–Leninist)	Basanta Kumar Nemwang	13,457
Nepali Congress	Dipak Prakash Baskota	3,180
Result	CPN (UML) gain	

== See also ==
- List of parliamentary constituencies of Nepal
