= Miklajung Rural Municipality =

Miklajung Rural Municipality may refer to:

- Miklajung Rural Municipality, Morang
- Miklajung Rural Municipality, Panchthar
