= Nemwang =

Nemwang is a Nepalese surname. Notable people with that surname include:

- Subas Chandra Nemwang, Nepalese politician and the former chairman of Constituent Assembly of Nepal.
- Basanta Kumar Nemwang, Nepalese politician.
- Til Bikram Nembang, Nepalese senior litterateur.
