= Eagle FM =

Eagle FM may refer to:

- Eagle FM (Nepal)
- Eagle FM (Australia), a radio station in Goulburn, Australia
- Eagle FM 95.5, a radio station in the Philippines
- Eagle FM, a radio station in Northern Region, Ghana

== See also ==
- Eagle Radio, a former local commercial radio station in England
