= Phidim Municipality =

Headquarters of Panchthar District, Nepal

Phidim Municipality फिदिम नगरपालिका
- Municipality
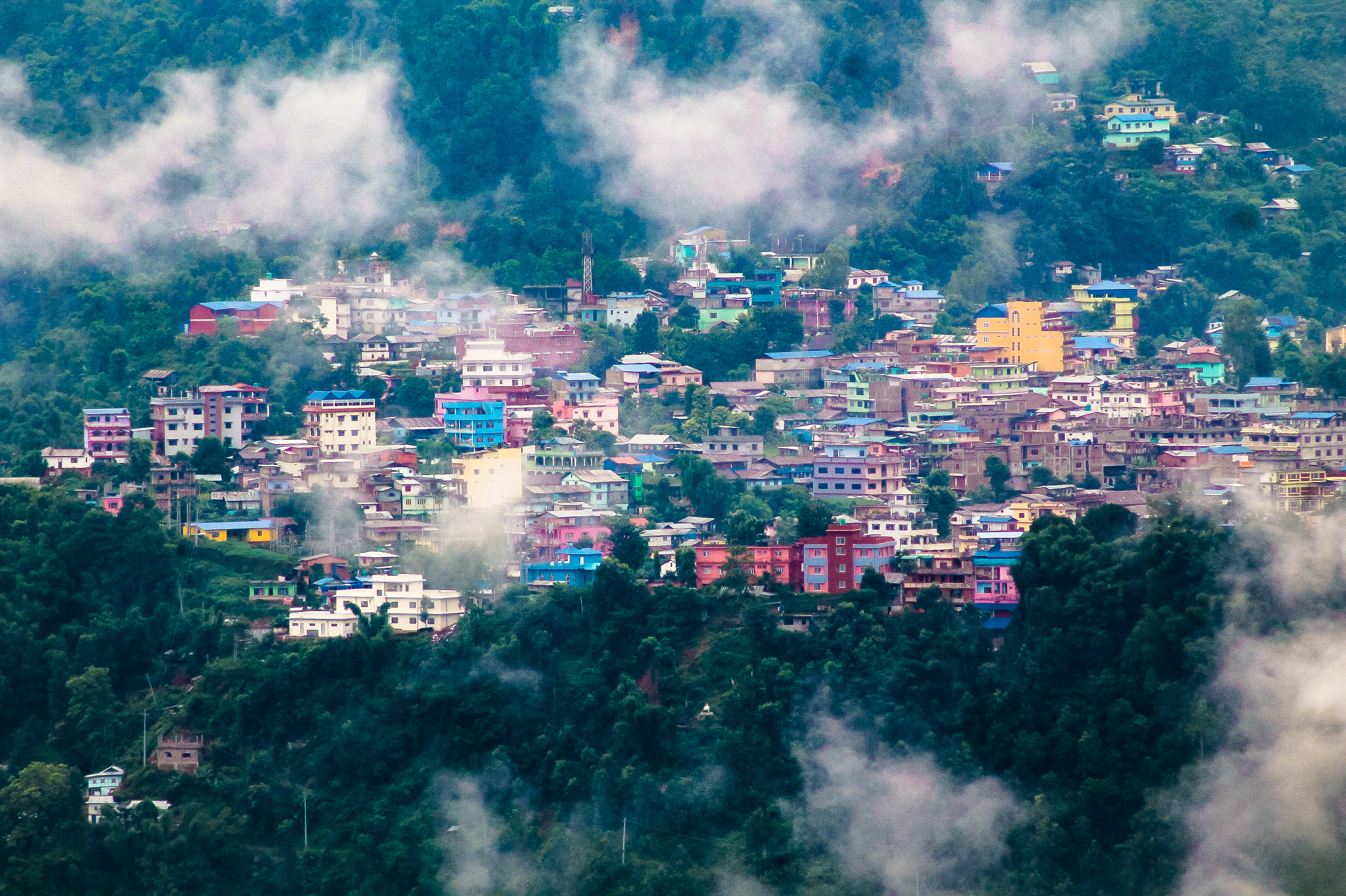
- Phidim bazar area

- Location in Nepal
- Coordinates: 27.146°N 87.766°E
- Country: Nepal
- Province: Koshi
- District: Panchthar
- Established: May 10, 2014

Government
  - Mayor: Mitra Prasad Kafle (NC)
  - Deputy Mayor: Radha Krishna Neupane

Population (2021)
  - Total: 48,713
- Time zone: UTC+5:45 (NST)
- Postal code: 57400
- Area code: 024
- Website: www.phidimmun.gov.np

Phidim (Nepali: फिदिम) is a municipality in Panchthar District, Koshi Province, Nepal. Phidim Municipality serves as the district headquarters of Panchthar and it is a commercial and administrative centre for surrounding settlements. The municipality is connected to the road system by the Mechi Highway. According to the 2021 Nepal census, it had a population of 48,495 people in 12,336 households.

== History ==
Phidim Municipality was established on 25 Baisakh 2071 BS (May 2014). Following the changes in local governments of Nepal in 2017, the municipality was expanded to incorporate the former village development committees of Lungupa, Nangin, Yangnam, Lumphabung and Ranitar. The municipality currently comprises 14 wards.

The old name of Phidim was "Pheden" which means "flat land on top of hills" or "hilltop plain".

== Transport ==
Phidim is connected to the rest of the country via the Mechi Highway, a 268 kilometres (167 mi) road that begins in Charali of Jhapa district and ends in Phungling. Buses and jeeps to Phidim are available at Birtamod and Ilam. Though abundant public transport is available in the region, locals have frequently complained about the excessive rise in fares that rose after the Covid pandemic. A new Madhya Pahadi Rajmargha connects Phidim with the Athrai Rural Municipality of Terhathum, which is linked to Koshi Highway in Myanglung (the headquarters of Terhathum District). Madhya Pahadi Rajmargha, one of the roads linking east and west Nepal through hilly areas, starts from the Panchthar district and is connected to Phidim. The Koshi Corridor is under construction and will connects Phidim directly with Dharan which is also the shortest route to the terai region. Phidim has hotels and inns.

== Geography ==
Phidim Municipality lies in the eastern part of Nepal. The municipal government says the area covers 192.50 square kilometres.The elevation in this area goes from about 421 metres up to 3,273 metres above sea level.

The municipality borders Phalelung Rural Municipality and Ilam District to the east, Kummayak Rural Municipality and Tehrathum District to the west, Hilihang Rural Municipality to the north, and Phalgunanda Rural Municipality to the south.

The main Phidim bazaar is the heart of the municipality. Phidim Municipality also includes rural settlements, around Phidim Bazaar.

== Demography ==
The 2021 Nepal census shows that Phidim Munacipality has a population of 48.495 people which includes 23,679 males and 24,816 females living in 12,336 households.

The population of people aged five years and above was 44,573 people. Of these people, 37,317 people were recorded as literate, giving a literacy rate of approximately 83.7%. The reported literacy rate was 89.49% among males and 78.24% among females.

The Phidim municipality is home to people from various ethnic and caste communities which includes Limbu, Rai, Chhetri, Brahmin, Tamang, Gurung, Magar, Newar, Dalit and et sectra.

== Climate ==
The climate of Phidim is warm during the summer and mild in winter. Maximum temperature in the summer is 35 °C, and in winter 5 °C.

== Economy ==
With its fertile soil and irrigation, Phidim produces rice, potato, cardamom and tea. Kanchenjunga Tea Estate, one of the major producers of Nepal tea, has a field office in Phidim.

Agriculture and animal husbandry are the two major ways people make living in Phidim Municipality. Many crops are grown in the municipality, including ginger, tea, cardamom, potatoes, rice, maize, wheat, millet, and pulses. Animals raised in the municipality include cattle, buffaloes, sheep, goats, pigs, etc.

Phidim bazaar serves as the commercial centre not only for the municipality but also other surrounding rural municipalities.

== Education ==
Phidim has 90 schools in total, which includes 75 public and 15 public schools. Phidim has 69 Pre-schools, 88 basic schools, and 24 secondary schools of which 7 offer +2 higher secondary programs.

== Media ==
Phidim has three community radio stations: Radio Sumatlung - 104.2 MHz, Eagle FM and Singhalila FM – 97.3 MHz, and two weekly newspapers, Public Post started in 2009 and Miklajung Awaj from February 2016.
