= Arubote =

Aarubote आरुबोटे
- Village development committee
- Location in Nepal
- Coordinates: 26.93°N 87.62°E
- Country: Nepal
- Province: Province No. 1
- District: Panchthar District

Population (1991)
  - Total: 3,482
- Time zone: UTC+5:45 (Nepal Time)

Aarubote is a village development committee in Panchthar District in the Province No. 1 of eastern Nepal. At the time of the 1991 Nepal census it had a population of 3482 people living in 652 individual households.

== List of villages ==
- Pekuwa
- Kerabari
- Mahepa
- Aahale
- Bajhagara
- Gairigaun
- Naagi
- Dhode
