= Mahendra Yadav (Nepali politician) =

Nepali politician

- महेन्द्र यादव

Deputy General Secretary of Nepali Congress
- In office 17 December 2021 – 15 January 2026
- President: Sher Bahadur Deuba
- Preceded by: Prakash Sharan Mahat
- Succeeded by: Mukta Kumari Yadav

Minister for Water Supply and Sanitation
- In office 26 July 2017 – 15 February 2018
- President: Bidhya Devi Bhandari
- Prime Minister: Sher Bahadur Deuba
- Preceded by: Prem Bahadur Singh
- Succeeded by: Bina Magar

Member of the Legislature Parliament
- In office 21 January 2014 – 14 October 2017
- PR group: Madheshi
- Constituency: Nepali Congress PR list

Member of the Constituent Assembly of Nepal
- In office 28 May 2008 – 28 May 2012
- PR group: Madheshi
- Constituency: Nepali Congress PR list

President of Nepal Tarun Dal
- In office 25 September 2007 – 20 September 2011
- Appointed by: Girija Prasad Koirala
- President: Girija Prasad Koirala; Sushil Koirala
- Preceded by: Binod Bahadur Kayastha
- Succeeded by: Udaya Shumsher Rana

Personal details
- Born: 18 August 1962 (age 64) Sapahi, Dhanusha, Dhanusa, Nepal
- Citizenship: Nepali
- Party: Nepali Congress
- Spouse: Bina Yadav
- Parents: Dip Narayan Yadav (father); Deeb Samain Yadav (mother)

Mahendra Yadav (Nepali: महेन्द्र यादव; born 18 August 1962) is a Nepali politician affiliated with the Nepali Congress. He served as Minister of Water Supply and Sanitation in the cabinet led by Sher Bahadur Deuba and formerly held the position of Deputy General Secretary of the Nepali Congress.

== Political life ==
Yadav was elected president of the Nepal Tarun Dal affiliated with Nepali Congress (Democratic) during its 3rd General Convention held in Chitwan in 17–20 July 2007, when the organization functioned as a parallel committee. Following the merger between Nepali Congress and Nepali Congress (Democratic), he was appointed president of the unified Nepal Tarun Dal as part of the merger agreement. He later served as a member of the 1st Constituent Assembly and 2nd Constituent Assembly from the Nepali Congress party. He joined the Deuba cabinet of Sher Bahadur Deuba on 26 July 2017 as Minister of Water Supply and Sanitation.

== Comparative table of elections ==
Elections	Parliament of Nepal	Constituency	Political party	Result	Vote percentage	Opposition		
Elections	Parliament of Nepal	Constituency	Political party	Result	Vote percentage	Candidate	Political party	Vote percentage
2017	5th	Dhanusha 4	NC	Lost	31.50%	Raghubir Mahaseth	CPN(UML)	35.51%
2022	6th	Dhanusha 4	NC	Lost	41.83%	Raghubir Mahaseth	CPN(UML)	41.99%
2026	7th	Dhanusha 4	NC	Lost	19.97%	Raj Kishor Mahato	RSP	60.98%

== Electoral history ==
He had previously represented the Nepali Congress in both Constituent Assemblies through the proportional representation system. He contested the House of Representatives elections from Dhanusha-4 in 2017, 2022, and 2026, but was unsuccessful in all three elections. In 2017 election he lost by small margin due to caste factor, intra-party misunderstanding and two Yadav candidates in field.

=== 2026 general election ===
Candidate	Party	Votes	%	+/–
Raj Kishor Mahato	Rastriya Swatantra Party	48,270	60.98	▲59.52
Mahendra Yadav	Nepali Congress	15,809	19.97	▼21.86
Raghubir Mahaseth	CPN (UML)	11,529	14.56	▼27.43
Sanjay Kumar Mahato	Nepali Communist Party	1,336	1.69	New entry
Indrajeet Kumar Yadav	Janamat Party	568	0.72	
Krishna Chandra Prasad Sah	Janata Samajbadi Party, Nepal	516	0.65	▼6.14
Others		1,128	1.43	
Total		79,156	100.00	–
Valid votes		79,156	94.27	
Invalid/blank votes		4,811	5.73	
Total votes		83,967	100.00	
Registered voters/turnout		127,778	65.71	
Majority		32,461		
Rastriya Swatantra Party gain				

=== 2022 general election ===
Candidate	Party	Votes	%	+/–
Raghubir Mahaseth	CPN (UML)	32,236	41.99	▲6.48
Mahendra Yadav	Nepali Congress	32,112	41.83	▲10.33
Mahajan Yadav	People's Socialist Party, Nepal	5,212	6.79	▼24.20
Krishna Kumar Mahato	Independent	4,343	5.66	New entry
Sanjay Kumar Yadav	Rastriya Swatantra Party	1,121	1.46	New entry
Others		1,744	2.27	
Total		76,768	100.00	–
Valid votes		76,768	93.03	
Invalid/blank votes		5,754	6.97	
Total votes		82,522	100.00	
Registered voters/turnout		116,742	70.69	
Majority		124		
CPN (UML) hold				

=== 2017 legislative elections ===
Dhanusha-4
Party	Candidate	Votes
CPN (Unified Marxist–Leninist)	Raghubir Mahaseth	22,532
Nepali Congress	Mahendra Yadav	19,991
Federal Socialist Forum, Nepal	Mahajan Yadav	19,662
Others		1,271
Invalid votes		3,861
Result	CPN (UML) gain	
Source: Election Commission

== See also ==
- Bimalendra Nidhi
- 2022 Janakpur municipal election
- Ram Krishna Yadav
- Ananda Prasad Dhungana
