= Khandrung =

Khandrung खान्द्रुङ गाविस
- Village development committee
- Country: Nepal
- Province: Province No. 1
- District: Panchthar District

Population (1991)
  - Total: 1,451
- Time zone: UTC+5:45 (Nepal Time)

Khandrung is a village development committee in Panchthar District in the Province No. 1 of eastern Nepal. At the time of the 1991 Nepal census it had a population of 1451 people living in 261 individual households.
