= Khagendra Sangraula =

Nepalese writer and columnist (born 1946)

- खगेन्द्र संग्रौला
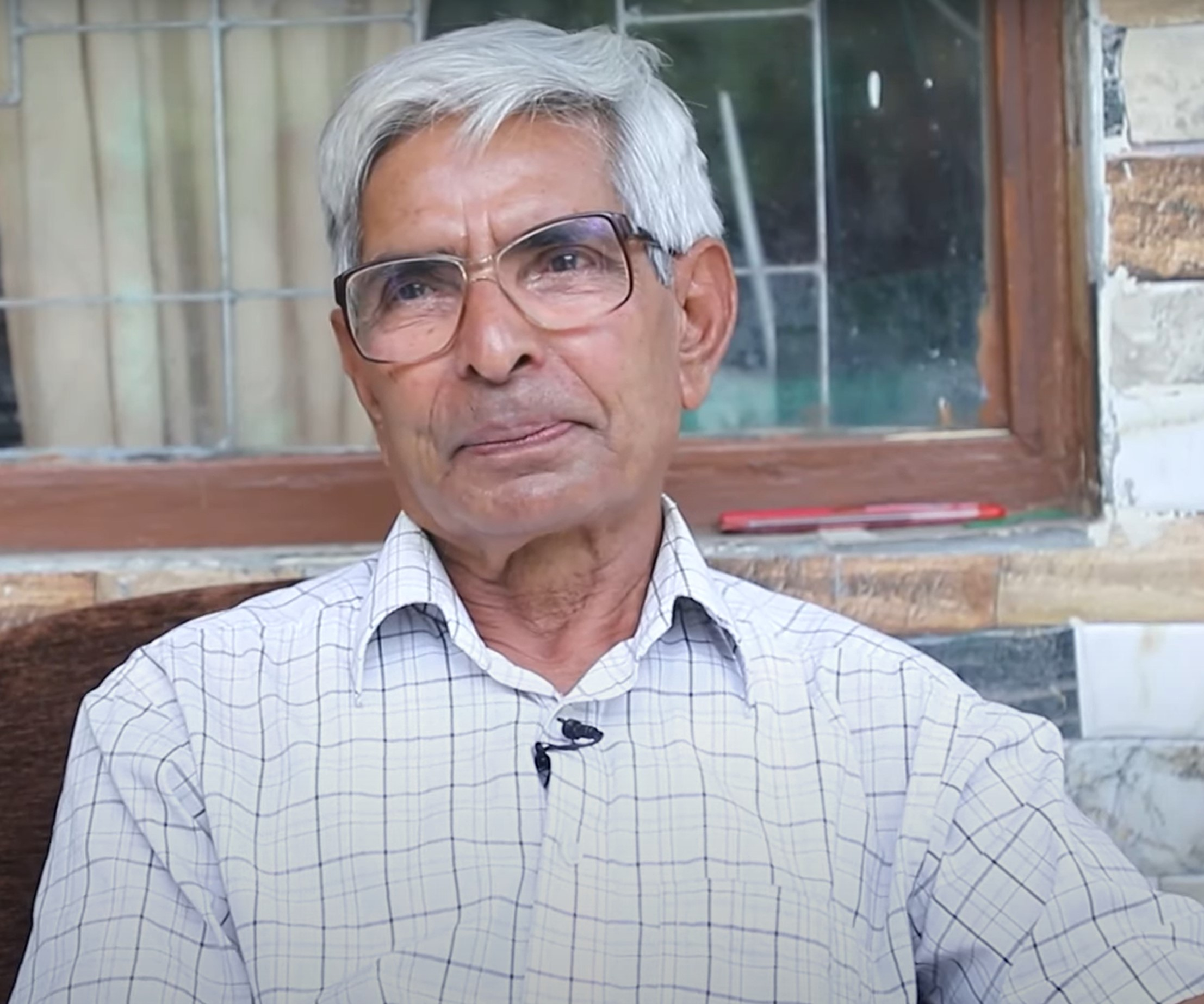
- Khagendra Sangraula (2022)
- Born: Khagendra Raj Sangraula; 25 November 1946 (age 79); Subhang, Panchthar district
- Other name: Kunsang Kaka
- Education: Tri-Chandra College
- Occupations: Writer, columnist
- Notable work: Aafnai Aakha ko Layama; Junkiriko Sangeet
- Spouse: Jamuna Gurung
- Children: 2
- Parent: Laxmi Prasad Sangraula (father)
- Awards: Padmashree Sahitya Puraskar, 2011

Khagendra Sangraula (Nepali: खगेन्द्र संग्रौला; born 1946) is a Nepalese veteran socialist, progressive writer, novelist, columnist and public intellectual. He has published multiple books and wrote multiple articles for various national dailies. He has also translated many English essays and books including the memoir of John Wood, into Nepali language. He is a regular columnist at Kantipur newspaper. His works played an important role during the Nepalese civil war in raising awareness among the general public.

== Early life and education ==
He was born on 25 November 1946 (10 Mangshir 2003 BS) in Subhang village, Panchthar district, Nepal. He did his schooling from Saraswati Middle School. He received an IA degree from Birendra Inter College (now Terhathum Multiple Campus) in Tehrathum district. He then received a bachelor's degree specializing in Nepali and English from Tri-Chandra College. He joined Tribhuvan University, Kirtipur for Masters studied but did not completed the degree. He used to teach to fulfill his expenses. After graduation too, he continued teaching, he taught for 14 years in Chitwan, Tanahun and Lamjung districts in western Nepal.

== Literary career ==
He began his literary career with Adhuro Prem, Bhijeko Rumal in Bihani newspaper in 2024 BS (c. 1967/1968).

He has published 5 short story collection, 5 essay collections, 3 novels, 3 plays and 36 translations as of 2019. He is known for his use of style of satire in his works.

He has received Mainali Puraskar, Krishna Mani Sahitya Puraskar and Gokul Joshi Puraskar. He won the Padmashree Sahitya Puraskar for his essays collection Aafnai Aakha ko Layama.

== Bibliography ==
- Balyakalkaa Padchapharu
- Kunsai Kaka Ka Katha
- Samjhanaka Kuinetaharu
- Junkiriko Sangeet
- Aama Ra Yamadutharu
- Bais Thunga Phool
- Samjhanako Ainaka Tasbirharu
- Jan-Andolanka Charraharu
- Aafnai Aakha ko Layama
- Satya ra Satta
- Sangrambahadur Sarki

== Personal life ==
He currently resides in Kathmandu with his wife Jamuna Gurung. He met his wife in Bandipur hospital in Tanahun where she worked as a nurse. They have a son and a daughter.
