= Gyanendra Kumar Yadav =

Nepalese politician

- ज्ञानेन्द्र कुमार यादव

Province Assembly Member of Madhesh Province
- In office 2017–2022
- Preceded by: N/A
- Succeeded by: Shes Narayan Yadav
- Constituency: Dhanusha 4 (constituency)

Personal details
- Born: April 28, 1975 (age 50)
- Party: People's Socialist Party, Nepal
- Occupation: Politician

Gyanendra Kumar Yadav (Nepali: ज्ञानेन्द्र कुमार यादव) is a Nepalese politician. He is a former member of Provincial Assembly of Madhesh Province from People's Socialist Party, Nepal. Yadav, a resident of Janakpur, was elected via 2017 Nepalese provincial elections from Dhanusha 4(A).

== Electoral history ==
=== 2022 Madhesh Provincial Assembly election ===
Dhanusha 4(A)
Party	Candidate	Votes
Nepali Congress	Shesh Narayan Yadav	14,055
CPN (UML)	Santosh Kumar Yadav	12,606
People's Socialist Party Nepal	Gyanendra Kumar Yadav	8,196
Result	Congress gain	
Source: Election Commission

=== 2017 Nepalese provincial elections ===
Party	Candidate	Votes
Federal Socialist Forum, Nepal	Gyanendra Kumar Yadav	14,606
Nepali Congress	Dr. Chandra Mohan Yadav	7,973
CPN (Unified Marxist–Leninist)	Babu Saheb Yadav	7,763
Others		883
Invalid votes		1,425
Result	FSFN gain	
Source: Election Commission
