= Pekuwa =

- Interactive map of Pekuwa
- Coordinates: 26°56′17″N 87°38′16″E
- Country: Nepal

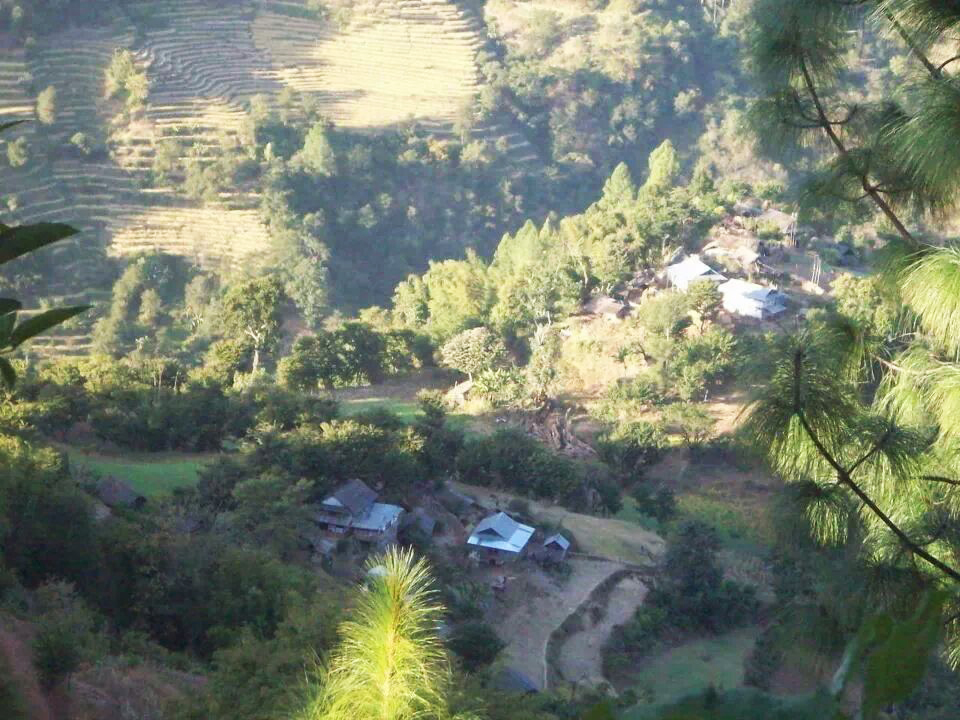
Pekuwa village, Arubote VDC of eastern Nepal

Pekuwa is a remote village located in Arubote village development committee ward no.3, Panchthar district of eastern Nepal. It has population of about 700. More than 98% of people are from Limbu community. It is situated at an altitude of 1171 meters from sea level. There are about 75 houses approximately. The main occupation of the people is agriculture. The literacy rate of the village is about 70%.
