= Parangbung =

Parangbung प्राङबुङ
- Village development committee
- Country: Nepal
- Province: Province No. 1
- District: Panchthar District

Population (1991)
  - Total: 4,178
- Time zone: UTC+5:45 (Nepal Time)

Parangbung is a village development committee in Panchthar District in the Province No. 1 of eastern Nepal. At the time of the 1991 Nepal census it had a population of 4178 people living in 695 individual households.
