= Nangin =

Nangin नाङ्गिन
- Village development committee
- Location in Nepal
- Coordinates: 27.15°N 87.83°E
- Country: Nepal
- Province: Province No. 1
- District: Panchthar District

Population (1991)
  - Total: 3,264
- Time zone: UTC+5:45 (Nepal Time)

Nangin (English: Nangeen) is a village development committee in Panchthar District in the Province No. 1 of eastern Nepal. At the time of the 1991 Nepal census it had a population of 3264 people living in 588 individual households.
