= Ranitar =

Ranitar रानीटार
- Village development committee
- Location in Nepal
- Coordinates: 27.10°N 87.82°E
- Country: Nepal
- Province: Province No. 1
- District: Panchthar District

Population (1991)
  - Total: 6,026
- Time zone: UTC+5:45 (Nepal Time)

Ranitar is a village development committee in Panchthar District in the Province No. 1 of eastern Nepal. At the time of the 1991 Nepal census it had a population of 6026 people living in 1086 individual households.
