= Rabi, Panchthar =

Rabi रबी
- Village development committee
- Location in Nepal
- Coordinates: 26.93°N 87.67°E
- Country: Nepal
- Province: Province No. 1
- District: Panchthar District

Population (1991)
  - Total: 3,686
- Time zone: UTC+5:45 (Nepal Time)
- Postal code: 57410
- Area code: 024

Rabi was a village development committee in Panchthar District, Nepal. It is popularly called as Rabi Bazaar. Currently, it is the main town of Miklajung Rural Municipality, in Panchthar district of Province No. 1, Nepal. At the time of the 1991 Nepal census, it had a population of 3686 people living in 678 individual households. The town is in ward no. 4 of Miklajung Rural Municipality, and has population of 4098 according to Nepal Census 2021.

Beautiful places like Hewari Danda, Yarang Jharana, Sencheleng Tea State, Jadibute Danda, Buddha Park, and Mangmalung are located in and around the town.
