= National Highway 07 (Nepal) =

Highway in Nepal

Kanchanpur-Fatepur-Chatara-Pakali Highway कञ्चनपुर-फत्तेपुर-चतरा-पकली राजमार्ग
- राष्ट्रिय राजमार्ग ०७
- National Highway 07
- NH07 in red line

Route information
- Maintained by MoPIT (Department of Roads)
- Length: 66 km (41 mi)
- History: Under construction

Major junctions
- North end: Pakali
- South end: Kanchanpur

Location
- Country: Nepal
- Provinces: Koshi Province, Madhesh Province

Highway system
- Roads in Nepal
← NH06	→ NH08

NH07 or Kanchanpur-Chakraghatti-Kalabanjar-Chatara-Pakali (previously: H08)is a proposed National Highway of Nepal which will be constructed between Koshi Province and Madhesh Province.

The life of the Koshi Barrage (Mahendra Highway "NH01") has come to an end so there is a need of an alternative route so a road will be constructed to bypass the Koshi Barrage. It is mentioned in the detailed project report that it will cost 21.74 billion rupees to construct a Koshi bridge and 20.63 billion rupees to construct the highway. It is estimated that the construction of the project including roads and bridges will cost around 33 billion, 10 million rupees.

A new route will be constructed from Kanchanpur in Kanchanrup Municipality of Saptari District on the East-West Highway to Koshi Tappu Wildlife Reserve. After that, there is a plan to construct a three-kilometer long bridge to cross the Saptakoshi River from the northern border of the reserve through the eastern side of the reserve. To connect the said road and the bridge to the East-West Highway, there is a plan to construct a road directly east from the bridge at Pakali of Sunsari.
