= Phaktep =

Phaktep फाक्तेप
- Village development committee
- Location in Nepal
- Coordinates: 27.02°N 87.72°E
- Country: Nepal
- Province: Province No. 1
- District: Panchthar District

Population (1991)
  - Total: 3,601
- Time zone: UTC+5:45 (Nepal Time)

Phaktep is a former village development committee now situated in Phalgunanda Rural Municipality of Panchthar District in the Province No. 1 of eastern Nepal. At the time of the 1991 Nepal census it had a population of 3601.
