= Subhang =

Subhang or Suvang सुभाङ
- Village development committee
- Location in Nepal
- Coordinates: 27.21°N 87.78°E
- Country: Nepal
- Zone: Mechi Zone
- District: Panchthar District

Population (1991)
  - Total: 4,862
- Time zone: UTC+5:45 (Nepal Time)

Subhang, or Suvang, is a village development committee (VDC) in Panchthar district, in the Mechi Zone of eastern Nepal. It is surrounded by the Bharapa, Ekteen, Panchami, Tharpu, Chiyandada and Chattedhunga VDCs. The Suvang khola and Tambar Khola (Tamur River) are the major rivers. Major market areas in Subhang include Jorpokhari and Chatture bazaar. Every two weeks, the Chatture local mela is organised. The main economic activity in Subhang is agriculture. Cash crops and staple crops are cultivated, with the main cash crop being cardamom; other cash crops include amlisho, ginger and vegetables. Animals such as chickens, pigs, cattle, goats, buffaloes and sheep are raised for husbandry.

== Demographics ==
At the time of the 1991 Nepal census, Subhang had a population of 4,862 across 800 individual households. Of these, the majority were Limbu people. Other recorded ethnic groups include Tamang, Sherpa, Brahmins, Rai, Chhettris, Suhang, Yonghang, Pandhak, Moktan, Ojha, Mainali and Rais.

The 2001 Nepal Census found the majority religion to be Hinduism (53%), followed by Kirant (41%), Buddhism (5%) and several others (1%).
