= Bhishma Raj Angdembe =

Nepali politician

Honourable Bhishma Raj Angdembe
- भीष्म राज आङदेम्बे

Leader of the Opposition
- Incumbent
- Assumed office 27 April 2026
- Prime Minister: Balen Shah
- Preceded by: Pushpa Kamal Dahal (2025)

Member of the House of Representatives
- Incumbent
- Assumed office 26 March 2026
- Constituency: Party list

Joint General Secretary of Nepali Congress
- In office 17 December 2021 – 16 January 2026
- President: Sher Bahadur Deuba
- Preceded by: Prakash Sharan Mahat

Member of the Constituent Assembly / Legislature Parliament
- In office 21 January 2014 – 14 October 2017
- Preceded by: Damber Singh Sambahamphe
- Succeeded by: Constituency abolished
- Constituency: Panchthar 2

Personal details
- Born: Panchthar District, Koshi Province, Nepal
- Party: Nepali Congress

Bhishma Raj Angdembe (Nepali: भीष्म राज आङदेम्बे) is a Nepalese politician and member of House of Representatives representing Nepali Congress. He is the parliamentary leader of Nepali Congress and Leader of Opposition in the 7th House of Representatives. Angdembe was elected under the proportional representation system.

In April 2026, following the general elections, the Nepali Congress party nominated Bhishma Raj Angdembe as the leader of its parliamentary party. He was elected as Deputy General Secretary of Nepali Congress party from 14th general convention of Nepali Congress.
