= Yukta Prasad Vetwal =

Nepalese politician

Personal details
- Party: CPN (UML)

Yukta Prasad Vetwal is a Nepalese politician. He contested 1999 legislative election as a Communist Party of Nepal (Unified Marxist-Leninist) candidate in the Jhapa-4 constituency. He was defeated by Minister of Foreign Affairs and Nepali Congress candidate Chakra Prasad Bastola by a margin of 26 votes. In total Vetwal got 15645 votes. After the elections Vetwal ordered a recount by the Special Election Court of Ilam.
