= Pauwa Sartap =

Coordinates: 27°2′N 87°47′E

Pauwa Sartap पौवासारताप
- Village development committee
- Interactive map of Pauwa Sartap
- Country: Nepal
- Province: Province No. 1
- District: Panchthar District

Population (1991)
  - Total: 3,616
- Time zone: UTC+5:45 (Nepal Time)

Pauwa Sartap is a village development committee in Panchthar District in the Province No. 1 of eastern Nepal. At the time of the 1991 Nepal census it had a population of 3616 people living in 643 individual households.
