= Yangnam =

Coordinates: 27°10′N 87°51′E

Yangnam याङनाम
- Village development committee
- Interactive map of Yangnam
- Country: Nepal
- Zone: Mechi Zone
- District: Panchthar District

Population (1991)
  - Total: 2,658
- Time zone: UTC+5:45 (Nepal Time)
- Postal code: 57404
- Area code: 024

Yangnam is a village development committee in Panchthar District in the Mechi Zone of eastern Nepal. At the time of the 1991 Nepal census it had a population of 2658 people living in 490 individual households.
