= Bharapa =

Coordinates: 27°10′N 87°46′E

Bharpa भारपा
- Village development committee
- Interactive map of Bharpa
- Country: Nepal
- Province: Province No. 1
- District: Panchthar District

Population (1991)
  - Total: 6,180
- Time zone: UTC+5:45 (Nepal Time)

Bharpa is a village development committee in Panchthar District in the Province No. 1 of eastern Nepal. At the time of the 1991 Nepal census, it had a population of 6,180 people living in 1,089 individual households.
