= Suhang =

Region in China

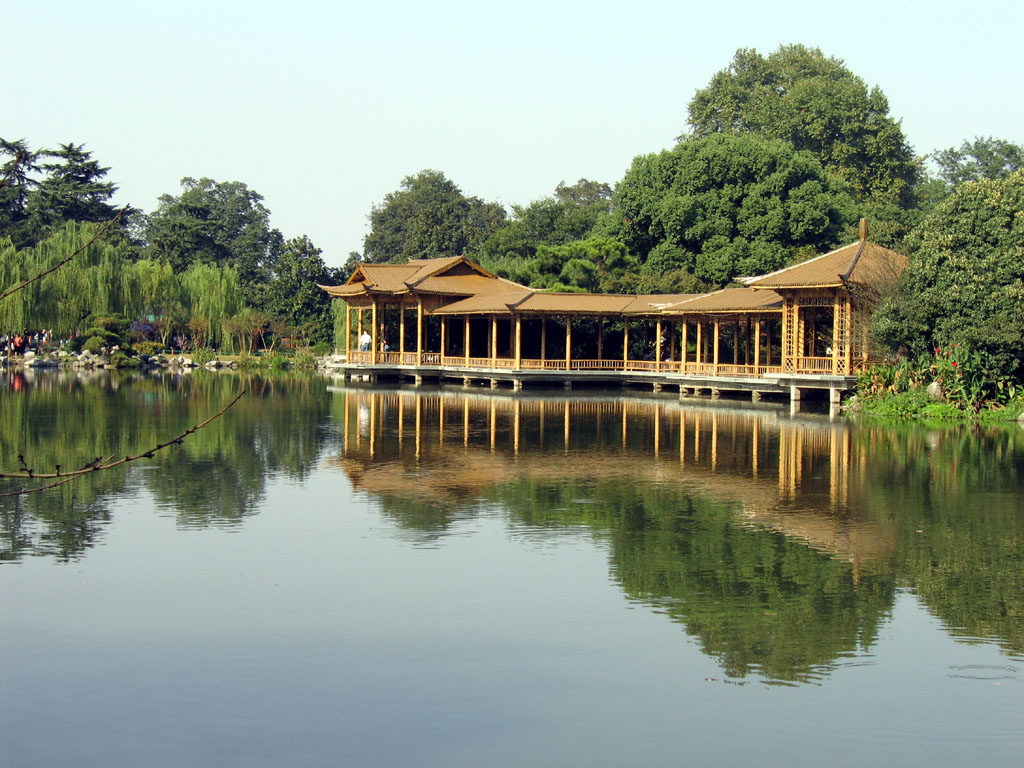
Buildings on West Lake, Hangzhou

Suhang (苏杭) is the region of China encompassing the cities of Suzhou and Hangzhou (in the provinces of Jiangsu and Zhejiang, respectively).

There is a Chinese saying that translates as "above, there is heaven; below, there is Suzhou and Hangzhou" (上有天堂, 下有蘇杭 or 上有天堂, 下有苏杭; pinyin: shàng yǒu tiāntáng, xià yǒu sūháng), referring to the legendary beauty of this region.
