= Aangsarang =

Place in Nepal

Aangsarang आङसराङ
- Village development committee
- Location in Nepal Aangsarang (Asia)
- Coordinates: 27.04°N 87.70°E
- Country: Nepal
- Province: Province No. 1
- District: Panchthar District

Population (1991)
  - Total: 6,145
- Time zone: UTC+5:45 (Nepal Time)

Aangsarang is a village development committee in Panchthar District in the Province No. 1 of eastern Nepal. At the time of the 1991 Nepal census it had a population of 6145.
