= Sarangdanda =

Sarangdanda सराङडाडा
- Village development committee
- Location in Nepal
- Coordinates: 26.99°N 87.68°E
- Country: Nepal
- Zone: Mechi Zone
- District: Panchthar District

Population (1991)
  - Total: 5,184
- Time zone: UTC+5:45 (Nepal Time)

Sarangdanda is a village development committee in Panchthar District in the Mechi Zone of eastern Nepal. At the time of the 1991 Nepal census it had a population of 5184 people living in 965 individual households.
