= Raghubir Mahaseth =

Nepalese politician

Honourable Raghubir Mahaseth MP
- रघुवीर महासेठ

Deputy Prime Minister of Nepal
- In office 6 March 2024 – 3 July 2024 Serving with Narayan Kaji Shrestha and Rabi Lamichhane
- President: Ram Chandra Poudel
- Prime Minister: Pushpa Kamal Dahal
- Preceded by: Purna Bahadur Khadka
- In office 4 June 2021 – 22 June 2021 Serving with Bishnu Prasad Paudel and Rajendra Mahato
- President: Bidya Devi Bhandari
- Prime Minister: Khadga Prasad Sharma Oli
- Preceded by: Ishwar Pokhrel; Upendra Yadav
- Succeeded by: Bishnu Prasad Paudel; Narayan Kaji Shrestha; Rabi Lamichhane

Minister of Physical Infrastructure and Transport of Nepal
- In office 6 March 2024 – 3 July 2024
- President: Ram Chandra Poudel
- Prime Minister: Pushpa Kamal Dahal
- Preceded by: Prakash Jwala
- In office 16 March 2018 – 20 November 2019
- President: Bidya Devi Bhandari
- Prime Minister: KP Sharma Oli
- Preceded by: Bir Bahadur Balayar
- Succeeded by: Basanta Kumar Nemwang

Minister of Foreign Affairs
- In office 4 June 2021 – 22 June 2021
- President: Bidya Devi Bhandari
- Prime Minister: Khadga Prasad Sharma Oli
- Preceded by: Pradeep Kumar Gyawali

Minister of Irrigation
- In office 13 February 2011 – 29 August 2011
- President: Ram Baran Yadav
- Prime Minister: Jhala Nath Khanal
- Preceded by: Bal Krishna Khand
- Succeeded by: Mahendra Raya Yadav

Member of Parliament, Pratinidhi Sabha
- In office 4 March 2018 – 26 March 2026
- Preceded by: Sanjay Kumar Shah
- Succeeded by: Raj Kishor Mahato
- Constituency: Dhanusha 4

Member of Constituent Assembly
- In office 2009 – 28 May 2012
- Preceded by: Ram Baran Yadav
- Succeeded by: Chandra Mohan Yadav
- Constituency: Dhanusha 5

Personal details
- Born: 6 August 1961 (age 65)
- Party: CPN (UML) (before 2018; 2021-present)
- Other political affiliations: Nepal Communist Party (2018-2021)
- Spouse: Julie Kumari Mahato
- Children: 1

Raghubir Mahaseth (Nepali: रघुविर महासेठ) is a Nepalese politician. He was the Deputy Prime Minister and the Physical Infrastructure and Transportation Minister. He serves as the Central Secretary of CPN UML, the in-charge of the Madhesh Province of Nepal for CPN UML, and was a member of the House of Representatives of the federal parliament of Nepal. He previously served as the Deputy Prime Minister and Minister of Foreign Affairs in 2021, the Ministry of Physical Infrastructure and Transport from 2018 to 2020, and the Minister of Irrigation in 2011.

== Electoral history ==
He has been elected to the Pratinidhi Sabha from Dhanusha-4 2017 on a CPN (UML) ticket. He contested 1999 elections from Marxist–Leninist for the first time. He contested election but won only in 2009 by-election from Dhanusha-5 and 2017 election from Dhanusha-4 once each

=== 1999 legislative elections ===
Dhanusha-3
Party	Candidate	Votes
Nepali Congress	Ananda Prasad Dhungana	15,026
Rastriya Prajatantra Party (Chand)	Hem Bahadur Malla	13,736
CPN (Unified Marxist–Leninist)	Anand Yadav	10,256
CPN (Marxist–Leninist)	Raghubir Mahaseth	9,974
Others		3,272
Invalid Votes		1,301
Result	Congress hold	
Source: Election Commission

=== 2008 Constituent Assembly election ===
Dhanusha 4
Party	Candidate	Votes
Madhesi Janadhikar Forum, Nepal	Sanjay Kumar Sah	13,422
CPN (Unified Marxist–Leninist)	Raghubir Mahaseth	9,282
Terai Madhes Loktantrik Party	Brishesh Chandra Lal	4,965
Nepali Congress	Lila Koirala	4,363
CPN (Maoist)	Arbind Kumar Lal Karna	1,847
Sadbhavana Party	Ram Dayal Sah	1,344
Others		3,197
Invalid votes		2,941
Result	Forum Nepal gain	
Source: Election Commission

=== 2013 Constituent Assembly election ===
Dhanusha-5

Party	Candidate	Votes	Status
Nepali Congress	Chandra Mohan Yadav	11,703	Elected
CPN-UML	Raghubir Mahaseth	10,023	Lost
Result	Congress hold		
Source: Chandra Mohan Yadav#cite note-:0-1

=== 2017 legislative elections ===
Dhanusha 4
Party	Candidate	Votes
CPN (Unified Marxist–Leninist)	Raghubir Mahaseth	22,532
Nepali Congress	Mahendra Yadav	19,991
Federal Socialist Forum, Nepal	Mahajan Yadav	19,662
Others		1,271
Invalid votes		3,861
Result	CPN (UML) gain	
Source: Election Commission

== See also ==
- 2022 Janakpur municipal election
- Satrudhan Mahato
