= Kurumba, Panchthar =

Kurumba कुरुम्बा
- Village development committee
- Location in Nepal
- Coordinates: 26.89°N 87.67°E
- Country: Nepal
- Province: Province No. 1
- District: Panchthar District

Population (1991)
  - Total: 3,623
- Time zone: UTC+5:45 (Nepal Time)

Kurumba is a village development committee in Panchthar District in the Province No. 1 of eastern Nepal. At the time of the 1991 Nepal census it had a population of 3623 people living in 622 individual households.
