= Satrudhan Mahato =

Nepalese politician

Honourable Satrughan Mahato
- सत्रुधन महतो

Minister for Industry, Tourism, and Forest of Madhesh Province
- Incumbent
- Assumed office 20 November 2021
- Governor: Hari Shankar Mishra
- Chief minister: Lalbabu Raut
- Preceded by: Ram Naresh Raya

Member of Provincial Assembly of Madhesh Province
- Incumbent
- Assumed office 2017
- Constituency: Dhanusha 4(B)

Personal details
- Born: Dhanusha, Nepal
- Party: CPN (Unified Socialist)
- Website: moitfe.p2.gov.np

Satrughan Mahato is a Nepalese politician belonging to CPN (Unified Socialist). He is the incumbent minister of Madhesh Province government. He is member of Provincial Assembly of Madhesh Province.

Mahato is also the leader of party the party having been selected unopposed.

== Political career ==
Satrudhan Mahato has served previously as member of Constituent Assembly. Mahato left CPN (UML) to join the CPN (Unified Socialist) led by former Prime Minister Madhav Kumar Nepal.

Mahato helf Raghubir Mahasheth though both Mahasheth and Mahato were elected from same constituency (Dhanusha 4) from CPN (UML) ticket.

== Electoral history ==
Dhanusha 4(B)
Party	Candidate	Votes
CPN (Unified Marxist-Leninist)	Shatrudhan Mahato	12,800
Nepali Congress	Basulal Mahato Koiri	11,549
Raj Kishore Mahato	Federal Socialist Forum, Nepal	7,940
Others		693
Invalid votes		1,597
Result	CPN (UML) gain	
Source: Election Commission

== See also ==
- Ram Chandra Jha
- CPN (Unified Socialist)
- Lalbabu Raut cabinet
- Ram Saroj Yadav
