= Sidin =

Sidin सिदिन
- Village development committee
- Location in Nepal
- Coordinates: 27.14°N 87.92°E
- Country: Nepal
- Zone: Mechi Zone
- District: Panchthar District

Population (1991)
  - Total: 3,901
- Time zone: UTC+5:45 (Nepal Time)

Sidin is a village development committee in Panchthar District in the Mechi Zone of eastern Nepal. At the time of the 1991 Nepal census, a population of 3901 people was living in 694 individual households.
