= Ektin =

Ektin एकतीन
- Village development committee
- Location in Nepal
- Coordinates: 27.21°N 87.87°E
- Country: Nepal
- Province: Province No. 1
- District: Panchthar District

Population (1991)
  - Total: 2,764
- Time zone: UTC+5:45 (Nepal Time)

Ektin (English: Ekteen), is a village development committee in Panchthar District in the Province No. 1 of eastern Nepal. At the time of the 1991 Nepal census it had a population of 2764 people living in 497 individual households.
