= Chyangthapu =

Village development committee in Province No. 1, Nepal

Chyangthapu च्याङ्थापु
- Village development committee
- Location in Nepal
- Coordinates: 27.25°N 87.98°E
- Country: Nepal
- Province: Province No. 1
- District: Panchthar District

Population (1991)
  - Total: 2,659
- Time zone: UTC+5:45 (Nepal Time)
- Postal code: 57401
- Area code: 024

Chyangthapu is a village development committee in Panchthar District in the Province No. 1 of eastern Nepal. At the time of the 1991 Nepal census it had a population of 2659.
