= Hangum =

Hangum हाङगुम
- Village development committee
- Location in Nepal
- Coordinates: 26.95°N 87.59°E
- Country: Nepal
- Province: Province No. 1
- District: Panchthar District

Population (1991)
  - Total: 2,925
- Time zone: UTC+5:45 (Nepal Time)

Hangum is a village development committee in Panchthar District in the Province No. 1 of eastern Nepal. At the time of the 1991 Nepal census it had a population of 2925 people living in 526 individual households.

Aarubote VDC in to the east, Mouwa VDC and Olane VDC in the north, Limba and Durdimba in the South respectively.
