= Nawamidanda =

Nawamidanda नवमीडाँडा
- Village development committee
- Location in Nepal
- Coordinates: 27.07°N 87.73°E
- Country: Nepal
- Province: Province No. 1
- District: Panchthar District

Population (1991)
  - Total: 4,254
- Time zone: UTC+5:45 (Nepal Time)
- Postal code: 57406
- Area code: 024

Nawamidanda is a village development committee in Panchthar District in the Province No. 1 of eastern Nepal. At the time of the 1991 Nepal census it had a population of 4254 people living in 734 individual households.
