= Phalaicha =

Phalaicha फलैंचा
- Village development committee
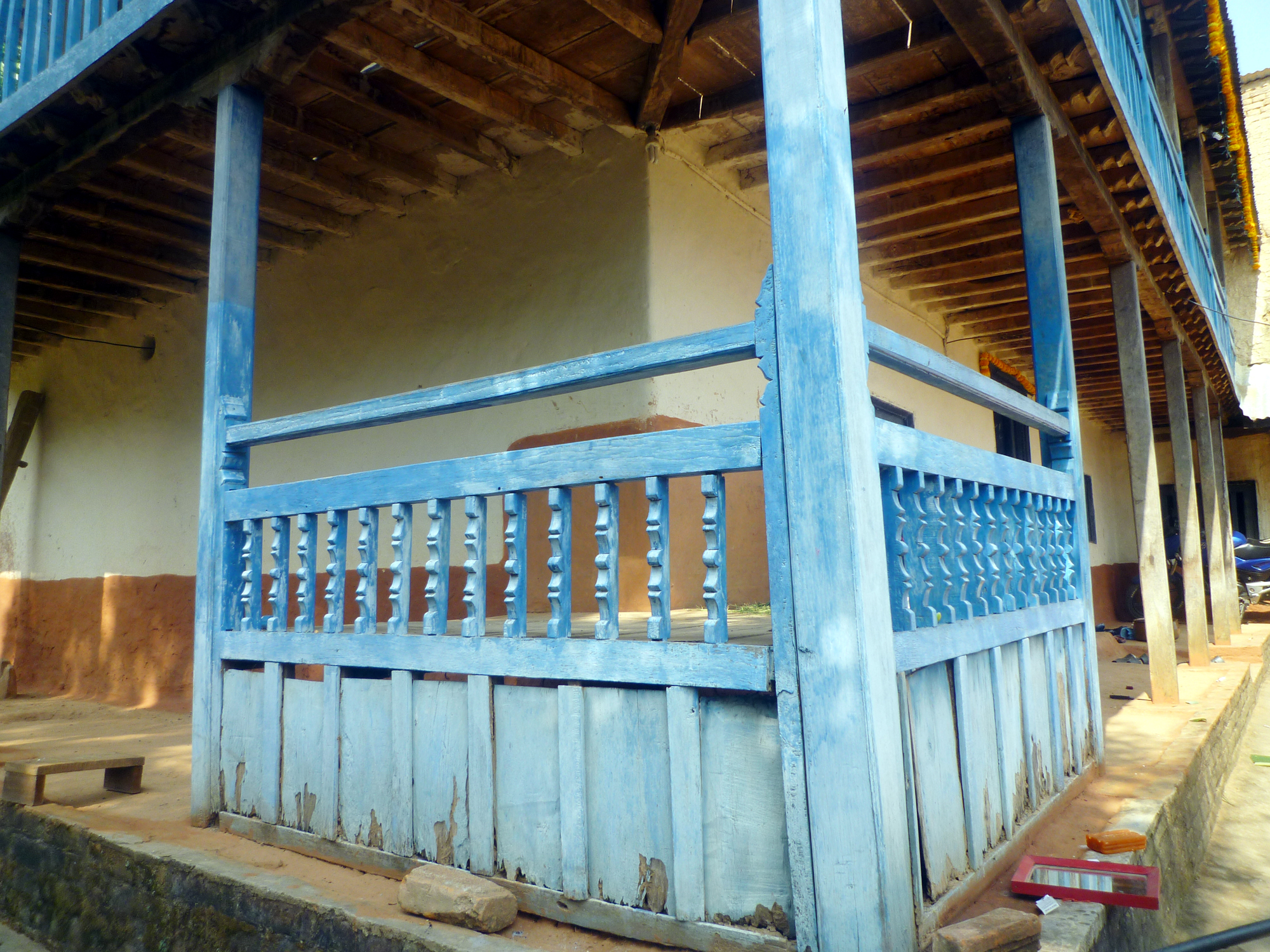
- Phalaichia

- Location in Nepal
- Coordinates: 27.31°N 88.01°E
- Country: Nepal
- Province: Province No. 1
- District: Panchthar District

Population (1991)
  - Total: 3,195
- Time zone: UTC+5:45 (Nepal Time)

Phalaicha is a village development committee in Panchthar District in the Province No. 1 of eastern Nepal. At the time of the 1991 Nepal census it had a population of 3195 people living in 544 individual households.
