= Aangna =

Place in Nepal

Aangna आङना
- Village development committee
- Location in Nepal
- Coordinates: 27.02°N 87.58°E
- Country: Nepal
- Province: Province No. 1
- District: Panchthar District

Population (1991)
  - Total: 3,192
- Time zone: UTC+5:45 (Nepal Time)

Aangna is a village development committee in Panchthar District in the Province No. 1 of eastern Nepal. At the time of the 1991 Nepal census it had a population of 3192 people living in 573 individual households.
