= Panchami, Panchthar =

Panchami पञ्चमी
- Village development committee
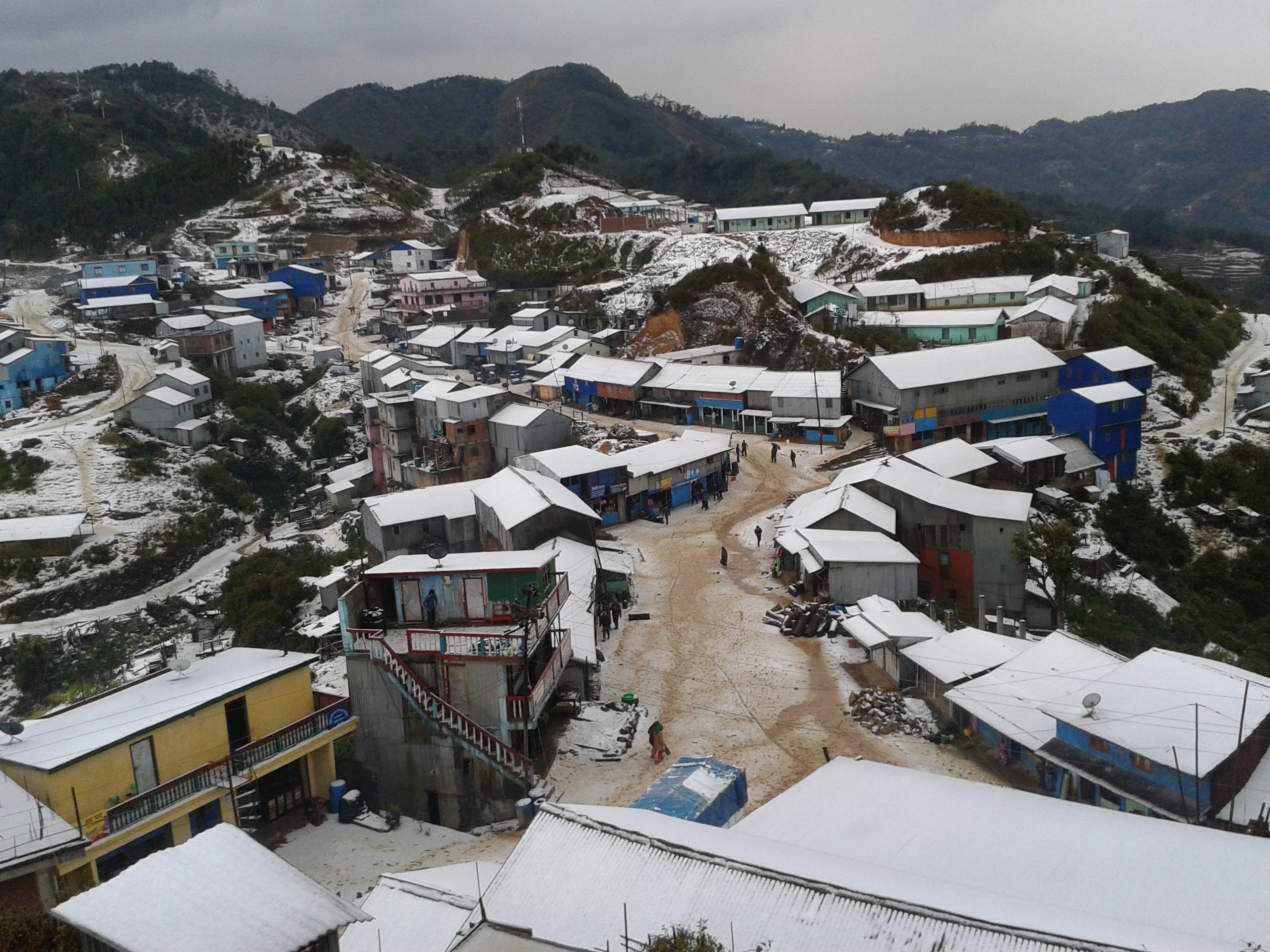
- Panchami

- Location in Nepal
- Coordinates: 27.24°N 87.78°E
- Country: Nepal
- Province: Province No. 1
- District: Panchthar District

Population (1991)
  - Total: 5,262
- Time zone: UTC+5:45 (Nepal Time)

Panchami is a village development committee in Panchthar District in the Province No. 1 of eastern Nepal. At the time of the 1991 Nepal census it had a population of 5262 people living in 873 individual households.
