= Eagle FM (Nepal) =

Radio station in Nepal

Eagle FM or Radio Eagle (Nepali: ईगल एफ:एम) 99.5 MHz is an independent local radio station at Phidim, Panchatar district in east zone of Nepal in Asia Pacific.It is owned by private group and it is running by being based in community service. Its all rights are limited to Managing Director. The station is mainly aimed at local people's culture & languages promotion. In its broadcast area its listenership outstrips Phidim, rivals like Singalila FM, Radio sumhatlung 104.2 MHz and local news advertisements. Radio or Eagle FM has not yet its sister stations. Eagle FM is available online. Its ability of broadcasting is roughly about 3 to 4 miles & also it is able to cover roughly 300000 to 400000 peoples staying around its areas.
