= Oyam, Gabon =

Oyam
- Location in Gabon
- Coordinates: 0°12′0″S 10°41′0″E
- Country: Gabon
- Province: Moyen-Ogooué Province

Oyam is a town in western Gabon. As of October 2020, it has a population of around 30,100.

== Transport ==
It is served by a station on the Trans-Gabon Railway.

== See also ==
- Transport in Gabon
