= Ambarpur =

Place in Nepal

Coordinates: 27°16′N 87°45′E

Ambarpur अमरपुर
- Village development committee
- Interactive map of Ambarpur
- Country: Nepal
- Province: Province No. 1
- District: Panchthar District

Population (1991)
  - Total: 5,849
- Time zone: UTC+5:45 (Nepal Time)
- Postal code: 57402
- Area code: 024

Ambarpur is a village development committee in Panchthar District in the Province No. 1 of eastern Nepal. At the time of the 1991 Nepal census it had a population of 5849 people living in 1016 individual households.
