= Tharpu =

Tharpu थर्पु
- Village development committee
- Location in Nepal
- Coordinates: 27.26°N 87.85°E
- Country: Nepal
- Zone: Mechi Zone
- District: Panchthar District

Population (1991)
  - Total: 4,104
- Time zone: UTC+5:45 (Nepal Time)

Tharpu is a village development committee (VDC) in Panthar (पान्थर) District in the Mechi Zone of eastern Nepal. At the time of the 1991 Nepal census it had a population of 4104 people living in 705 individual households.its geographical area stretches from Onyem and Yekten VDC (previously Khungwa VDC) on the East, Panchami VDC on the South, Naagi VDC on the West and bordering with Taplijong (ताप्लिजोङ)District on the North with Sinam and Saplakhu(साप्लाखू) VDC.In addition to traditional farming(rice, millet, maize, wheat and potato), a Tharpu's economy relies on remittance, particularly from Golf countries, Malaysia, Korea, Hong Kong, Singapore (police) and the United Kingdom. However, remittance from ex-British-Gurkha-soldiers' pension and cardamom is the most reliable and stable income for most of the affluent section of the population.
