= Damber Singh Sambahamphe =

Nepali politician

Damber Sing Sambahamphe
- डम्बरसिंह साम्बाहाम्फे
- Incumbent
- Assumed office 2008
- Constituency: Panchthar-2

Personal details
- Party: Communist Party of Nepal (UML)

Damber Sing Sambahamphe (Nepali: डम्बरसिंह साम्बाहाम्फे) is a Nepalese politician, belonging to the Communist Party of Nepal (UML). In the 2008 Nepalese Constituent Assembly election, on 10 April 2008, he was elected from the Panchthar-2 constituency, with 12,402 votes.
