= Chandra Mohan Yadav =

Nepali politician

Dr. Chandra Mohan Yadav
- चन्द्र मोहन यादव

Elected Member of Parliament of the House of Representatives
- Incumbent
- Assumed office 2026 -

Personal details
- Born: Janakpur, Dhanusa, Nepal
- Party: Nepali Congress
- Parent: Ram Baran Yadav (father)
- Education: PGIMER Chandigarh

Dr. Chandra Mohan Yadav (Nepali: चन्द्र मोहन यादव) is a Nepali politician of Nepali Congress and has been elected as Member of the Nepalese Parliament (Proportionate Candidate) in the House of Representatives. He is also central committee member of Nepali Congress. Yadav is the eldest son of Ram Baran Yadav, the first president of Federal Democratic Republic of Nepal. In the party, Yadav is one of the closest to vice president Bimalendra Nidhi.

Yadav is also a doctor (radiologist) by profession.

== Electoral history ==
2013 Constituent Assembly Election

Dhanusha-5

Party	Candidate	Votes	Status
Nepali Congress	Chandra Mohan Yadav	11,703	Elected
CPN-UML	Raghubir Mahaseth	10,023	Lost

== See also ==
- 2022 Janakpur municipal election
