= Dipak Prakash Baskota =

Nepalese politician

Deepak Prakash Baskota
- दिपक प्रकाश बास्कोटा

Personal details
- Born: 1945 (age 80–81) Phidim, Panchthar, Nepal
- Party: Nepali Congress
- Children: Samikchya Baskota

Deepak Prakash Baskota is a Nepalese politician. He is a former State Home Minister and executive chairman of the National Cooperative Federation of Nepal. Baskota has upheld the cooperative principle as part of the socialist agenda of Nepali Congress.

Baskota is the president of the Himalayan Orthodox Tea Producers Association and chairperson of the Tea Development Alliance. He is also an advisor to the National Cooperative Bank Ltd.

Baskota has contested the elections to the Pratinidhi Sabha national parliament in the Panchthar-1 constituency thrice. He won the seat in 1994, and came second in 1991 and 1999. He is also founder of cooperative movement in Nepal. He is a founder of Kanchanjangha Tea Estate (KTE).
