= Rani Gaun =

Coordinates: 27°5′N 87°40′E

Rani Gaun रानीगाउँ
- Village development committee
- Interactive map of Rani Gaun
- Country: Nepal
- Province: Province No. 1
- District: Panchthar District

Population (1991)
  - Total: 5,618
- Time zone: UTC+5:45 (Nepal Time)

Rani Gaun is a village development committee in Panchthar District in the Province No. 1 of eastern Nepal. At the time of the 1991 Nepal census it had a population of 5618 people living in 949 individual households.
