= Syabarumba =

Syabarumba स्याब्रुम्बा
- Village development committee
- Location in Nepal
- Coordinates: 27.07°N 87.60°E
- Country: Nepal
- Zone: Mechi Zone
- District: Panchthar District

Population (1991)
  - Total: 3,340
- Time zone: UTC+5:45 (Nepal Time)

Syabarumba is a village development committee in Panchthar District in the Mechi Zone of eastern Nepal. At the time of the 1991 Nepal census it had a population of 3340 people living in 598 individual households.
