= Bateshwar Rural Municipality =

Bateshwor बटेश्वर
- Rural Municipality
- Rural Municipality in Nepal
- Location in Nepal
- Coordinates: 26.88°N 86.82°E
- Country: Nepal
- Development Region: Central
- Zone: Janakpur
- District: Dhanusa
- Province: Madhesh

Government
  - Chairperson: Ram Ashish Mahato (NC)
  - Deputy chairperson: Phul Kumari Singh (NC)

Area
  - Total: 31.66 km^{2} (12.22 sq mi)

Population (2011)
  - Total: 21,530
  - Density: 680.0/km^{2} (1,761/sq mi)
  - Religions: Hindu Muslim Christian

Languages
  - Local: Maithili, Tharu, Nepali
- Time zone: UTC+5:45 (NST)
- Postal Code: 45600
- Area code: 041
- Website: www.bateshwormun.gov.np

Bateshwor (Nepali: बटेश्वर ) is a municipality in Danusha District in Province No. 2 of Nepal. It was formed in 2016 occupying current 5 sections (wards) from previous 5 VDCs. It occupies an area of 31.66 km^{2} with a total population of 21,530.
