= Basanta Kumar Nemwang =

Nepali politician

Honourable Basanta Kumar Nemwang
- वसन्त कुमार नेम्वाङ्ग

Minister of Physical Infrastructure and Transport
- In office 21 July 2019 – 12 July 2021
- President: Bidhya Devi Bhandari
- Prime Minister: K.P. Oli
- Preceded by: Raghubir Mahaseth
- Succeeded by: Renu Kumari Yadav

Minister of Agriculture and Livestock Development
- In office 13 June 2021 – 24 June 2021
- President: Bidhya Devi Bhandari
- Prime Minister: KP Sharma Oli

Minister of Water Supply
- In office 3 June 2021 – 24 June 2021
- President: Bidhya Devi Bhandari
- Prime Minister: KP Sharma Oli

Minister of Information and Communications
- In office 3 June 2021 – 24 June 2021
- President: Bidhya Devi Bhandari
- Prime Minister: KP Sharma Oli

Minister of Urban Development
- In office 20 February 2020 – 14 October 2020
- President: Bidya Devi Bhandari
- Prime Minister: KP Oli
- In office 13 June 2021 – 24 June 2021
- President: Bidya Devi Bhandari
- Prime Minister: Khadga Prasad Sharma Oli

Member of Parliament, Pratinidhi Sabha
- Incumbent
- Assumed office 4 March 2018
- Preceded by: Ganesh Kumar Kambang
- Constituency: Panchthar 1
- In office May 1999 – May 2002
- Preceded by: Dipak Prakash Baskota
- Succeeded by: Purna Kumar Sharma
- Constituency: Panchthar 1
- In office May 1991 – August 1994
- Preceded by: Constituency established
- Succeeded by: Dipak Prakash Baskota
- Constituency: Panchthar 1

Personal details
- Born: March 21, 1962 (age 64) Panchthar District
- Party: CPN (UML)
- Parent(s): Devi Prasad Nemwang (father); Bishnumaya Nemwang (mother)

Basanta Kumar Nembang is a Nepalese politician and former Minister of Physical Infrastructure and Transport.He also served as Minister of Agriculture and Livestock Development, Minister of Water Supply, Minister of Information and Communications and Minister of Urban Development in Second Oli cabinet. He is Member of Parliament, belonging to the Communist Party of Nepal (Unified Marxist-Leninist). Nembang has contested the Panchthar-1 constituency in all three legislative elections held since 1991. His main opponent in all three elections have been Nepali Congress leader Dipak Prakash Baskota.

== Election results ==
- 1991: 13457 votes (35.26%), winning
- 1994: 12989 votes (33.01%), 2nd place
- 1999: 17680 votes, winning

== Sources ==
- Institute for Development Studies. Third General Election: Emerging Scenario. Kathmandu: Institute for Development Studies, 1999. p. 15, 25, 54, 63
