= Mangjabung =

Mangjabung माङजाबुङ
- Village development committee
- Location in Nepal
- Coordinates: 27.03°N 87.64°E
- Country: Nepal
- Province: Province No. 1
- District: Panchthar District

Population (1991)
  - Total: 3,430
- Time zone: UTC+5:45 (Nepal Time)

Mangjabung is a village development committee in Panchthar District in the Province No. 1 of eastern Nepal. At the time of the 1991 Nepal census it had a population of 3430 people living in 645 individual households.
