= Panchthar District =

Coordinates: 27.20°N 87.83°E

Panchthar District पाँचथर जिल्ला
- District
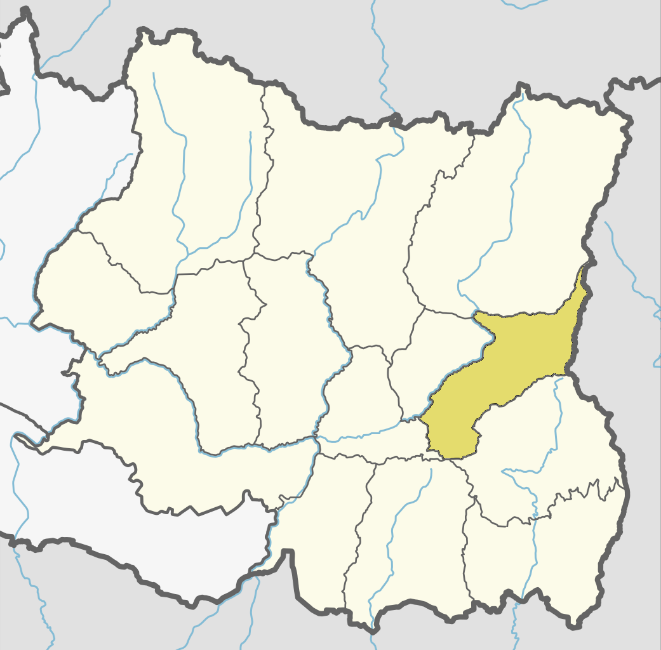
- Location of Panchthar district

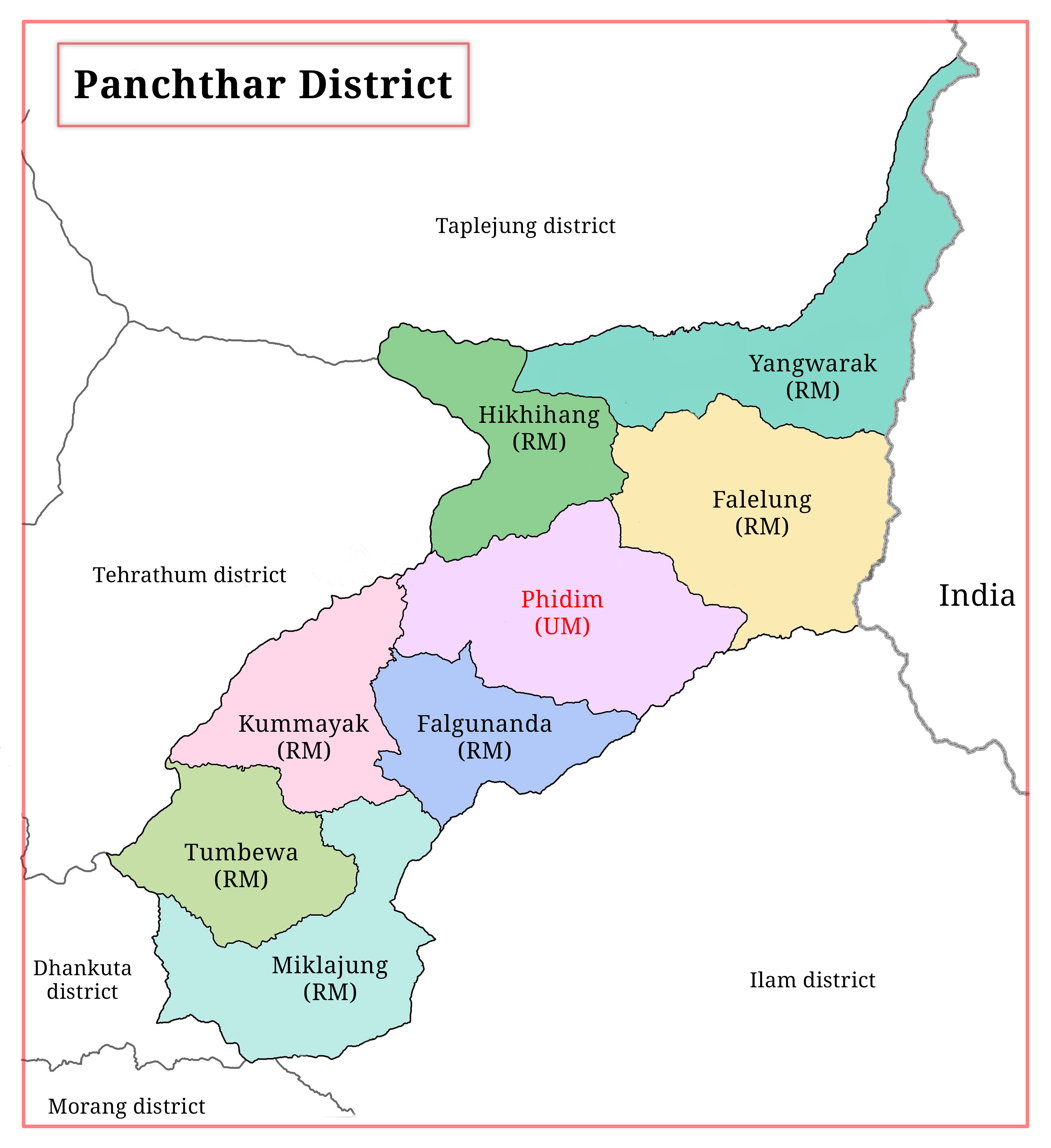
- Divisional map of Panchthar district
- Country: Nepal
- Province: Koshi Province
- Admin HQ.: Phidim

Government
  - Type: Coordination committee
  - Body: DCC, Panchthar

Area
  - Total: 1,241 km^{2} (479 sq mi)

Population (2011)
  - Total: 191,817
  - Density: 154.6/km^{2} (400.3/sq mi)
- Time zone: UTC+05:45 (NPT)

Panchthar District (Nepali: ne:पाँचथर जिल्ला) is one of 14 districts of Koshi Province in the eastern hilly region of Nepal. It is a Hill district of eastern Nepal. The district covers 1,241 km^{2} (479 sq mi) of area. The 2011 census counted 191,817 population. Phidim is the district headquarters.

== History ==
Panthar was a part of Old Dhankuta District during Rana era and until 1962. Dhankuta district had two subdivisions Chhathum and Tehrathum. Panchthar was a thum (county) under the Terhathum subvision. It became a separate district in 1962 when the old 32 traditional districts divided into 75 district.

== Geography and climate ==
Climate Zone	Elevation Range	% of Area
Upper Tropical	300 to 1,000 meters 1,000 to 3,300 ft.	18.3%
Subtropical	1,000 to 2,000 meters 3,300 to 6,600 ft.	52.6%
Temperate	2,000 to 3,000 meters 6,400 to 9,800 ft.	23.9%
Subalpine	3,000 to 4,000 meters 9,800 to 13,100 ft.	4.7%
Alpine	4,000 to 5,000 meters 13,100 to 16,400 ft.	0.4%

== Demographics ==
Historical population
Year	Pop.	±% p.a.
1981	153,746	—
1991	175,206	+1.32%
2001	202,056	+1.44%
2011	191,817	−0.52%
2021	172,400	−1.06%

At the 2021 Nepal census, Panchthar District had 42,495 households and a population of 172,400. 8.11% of the population was under 5 years of age. Panchthar had a literacy rate of 82.48% and a sex ratio of 1012 females per 1,000 males. 12,336 (7.16%) lived in urban areas.

Ethnicity/caste of Panchthar district (2021)
1. Limbu (43.4%)
2. Rai (13.5%)
3. Chhetri (9.14%)
4. Bahun (8.84%)
5. Tamang (7.15%)
6. Magar (3.66%)
7. Kami (3.27%)
8. Damai (2.08%)
9. Gurung (1.68%)
10. Newar (1.46%)
11. Sunuwar (1.16%)
12. Other Hill Janjati (2.58%)
13. Others (1.71%)

Ethnicity/caste: Janjatis make up the majority in the district at 73%. Limbu, the largest ethnic group make up almost 44% of the population.

Religion in Panchthar District (2021)
Religion	Percent
Kirat Mundhum	55.71%
Hinduism	29.21%
Buddhism	12.26%
Christianity	2.72%
Other or not stated	0.10%

Religion: 55.71% were Kirati, 29.21% were Hindu, 12.26% Buddhist, 2.72% Christian and 0.10% others.

Languages of Panchthar district (2021)
1. Limbu (42.3%)
2. Nepali (29.3%)
3. Bantawa (6.96%)
4. Tamang (6.82%)
5. Magar Dhut (3.41%)
6. Rai (2.86%)
7. Chamling (1.87%)
8. Gurung (1.16%)
9. Sunuwar (1.00%)
10. Others (4.37%)

As their first language, 42.27% of the population spoke Limbu, 29.28% Nepali, 6.96% Bantawa, 6.82% Tamang, 3.41% Magar Dhut, 2.86% Rai, 1.87% Chamling, 1.16% Gurung and 1.00% Sunuwar as their first language. In 2011, 33.9% of the population spoke Nepali as their first language.

== Municipality and Rural Municipalities of Panchthar ==
1. Phidim Municipality Nepali: फिदिम नगरपालिका (Phidim Municipality, Ranitar, Lumphabung, Yangnam(1-5), Nangin, Lungrupa)
2. Hilihang Rural Municipality Nepali: हिलिहाङ गाउँपालिका (Ambarpur, Panchami, Subhang, Bharapa)
3. Kummayak Rural Municipality Nepali: कुम्मायाक गाउँपालिका (Yasok, Rani Gaun, Mangjabung, Syabarumba)
4. Miklajung Rural Municipality Nepali: मिक्लाजुंग गाउँपालिका (Aarubote, Sarangdanda, Rabi, Kurumba, Limba, Durdimba)
5. Phalelung Rural Municipality (Nepali: फालेलुंग गाउँपालिका (Ektin, Memeng, Prangbung, Yangnam(6,9) Sidin)
6. Phalgunanda Rural Municipality (Nepali: फाल्गुनन्द गाउँपालिका (Nawamidanda, Imbung, Pauwa Sartap, Chilingdin, Aangsarang, Phaktep)
7. Tumbewa Rural Municipality Nepali: तुम्वेवा गाउँपालिका (Aangna, Olane, Hangum, Mauwa)
8. Yangawarak Rural Municipality Nepali: याङवरक गाउँपालिका (Chyangthapu, Phalaicha, Oyam, Tharpu, Nagi)

VDC's in small brackets means they are combined to form main Rural Municipality

== Previous Village Development Committees (VDCs) and Municipalities ==
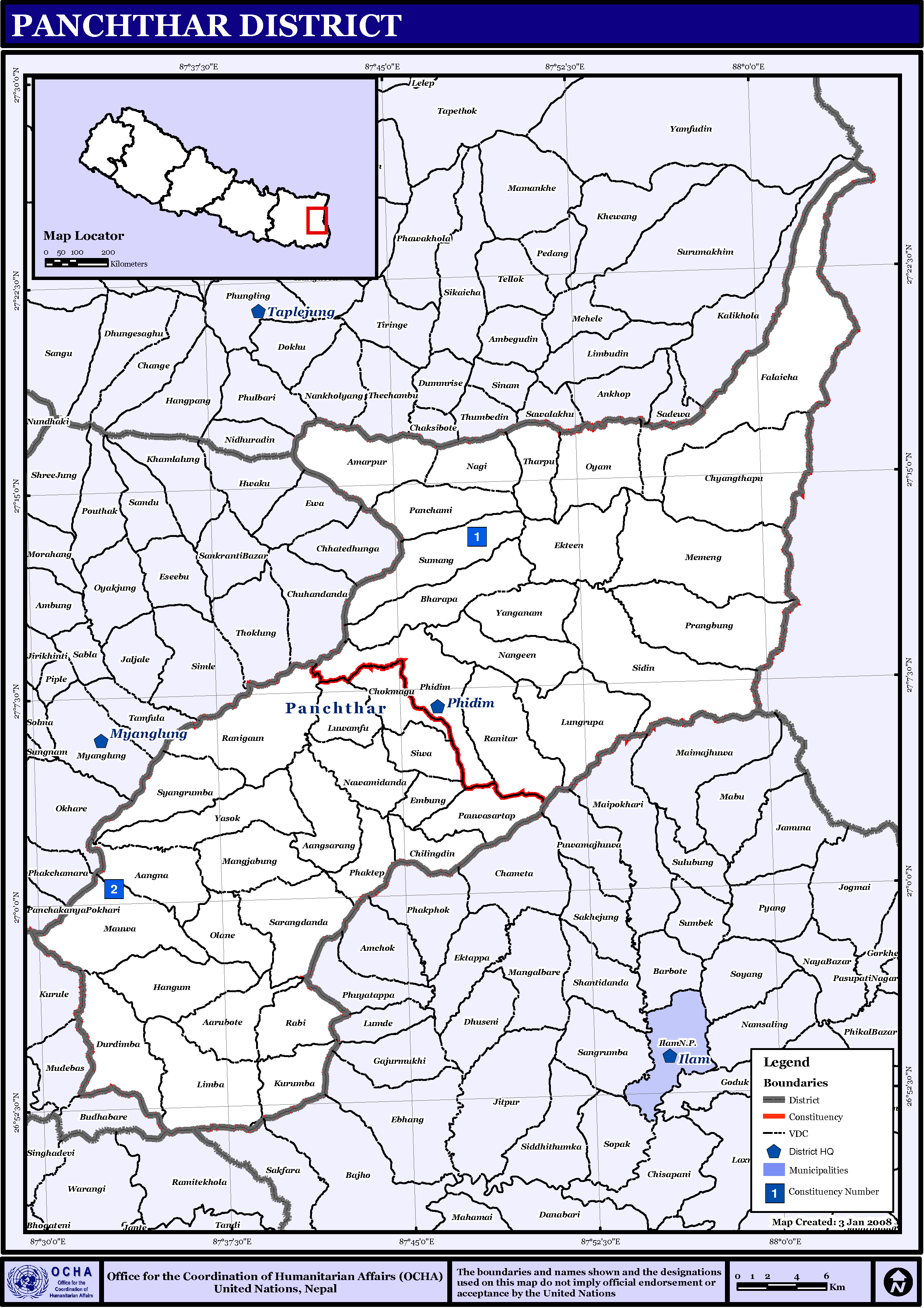
Map of the VDCs in Panchthar District

- Aangna
- Aangsarang
- Ambarpur
- Bharapa
- Chilingdin
- Chyangthapu
- Durdimba
- Ektin
- Embung
- Phalaicha
- Hangum
- Kurumba
- Limba
- Lungrupa
- Mangjabung
- Mauwa
- Memeng
- Nagi
- Nangin
- Nawamidanda
- Olane
- Oyam
- Panchami
- Prangbung
- Pauwa Sartap
- Phaktep
- Phidim Municipality
- Prangbung
- Rabi
- Rani Gaun
- Ranitar
- Sarangdanda
- Sidin
- Subhang
- Syabarumba
- Tharpu
- Yangnam
- Yasok
1. lumphabung
2. sarangdada
3. phaktep

== People from Panchthar District ==
- Basanta Kumar Nemwang, Politician and former minister.
- Bairagi Kainla, Poet and Former Chancellor of Nepal Academy.
- Bhishma Raj Angdembe, Politician.
- Damber Singh Sambahamphe, Politician.
- Ganesh Prasad Rijal, Politician.
- David Shankar, Singer.
- Rambahadur Limbu, Military officer.
- Upendra Subba, Poet, lyricist, Writer, Director.
- Rajendra Prasad Lingden, Politician and former Deputy Prime Minister of Nepal.
- Indra Bahadur Angbo, Politician.
- Khagendra Sangraula, Writer and columnist.
- Krishna Dharabasi, Writer and novelist.
- Manita Shrestha Pradhan, Nepalese judoka.
- Anjila Tumbapo Subba, Footballer.
- Dipak Prakash Baskota, Politician and businessman.

== See also ==
- Zones of Nepal
