= Mechi Highway =

Road in Nepal

Mechi Highway मेची राजमार्ग
- राष्ट्रिय राजमार्ग ०२
- National Highway 02
- Mechi Highway in red

Route information
- Maintained by MoPIT (Department of Roads)
- Length: 268 km (167 mi)

Major junctions
- South end: Kechana (Nepal)
- NH05 Postal Highway at Bhadrapur; NH04 at Bhadrapur; NH01 Mahendra Highway at Charaali, Mechinagar; NH11 at Suryodaya; NH74 at Chureghanti; NH03 at Phidim; NH06 at Ganesh Chok, Hilihang
- North end: Taplejung (Nepal)

Location
- Country: Nepal
- Provinces: Koshi Province
- Districts: Jhapa, Ilam, Panchthar & Taplejung
- Primary destinations: Prithivinagar, Bhadrapur, Duhagadhi, Budhabare, Kanyam, Phikkal

Highway system
- Roads in Nepal
← NH01	→ NH03

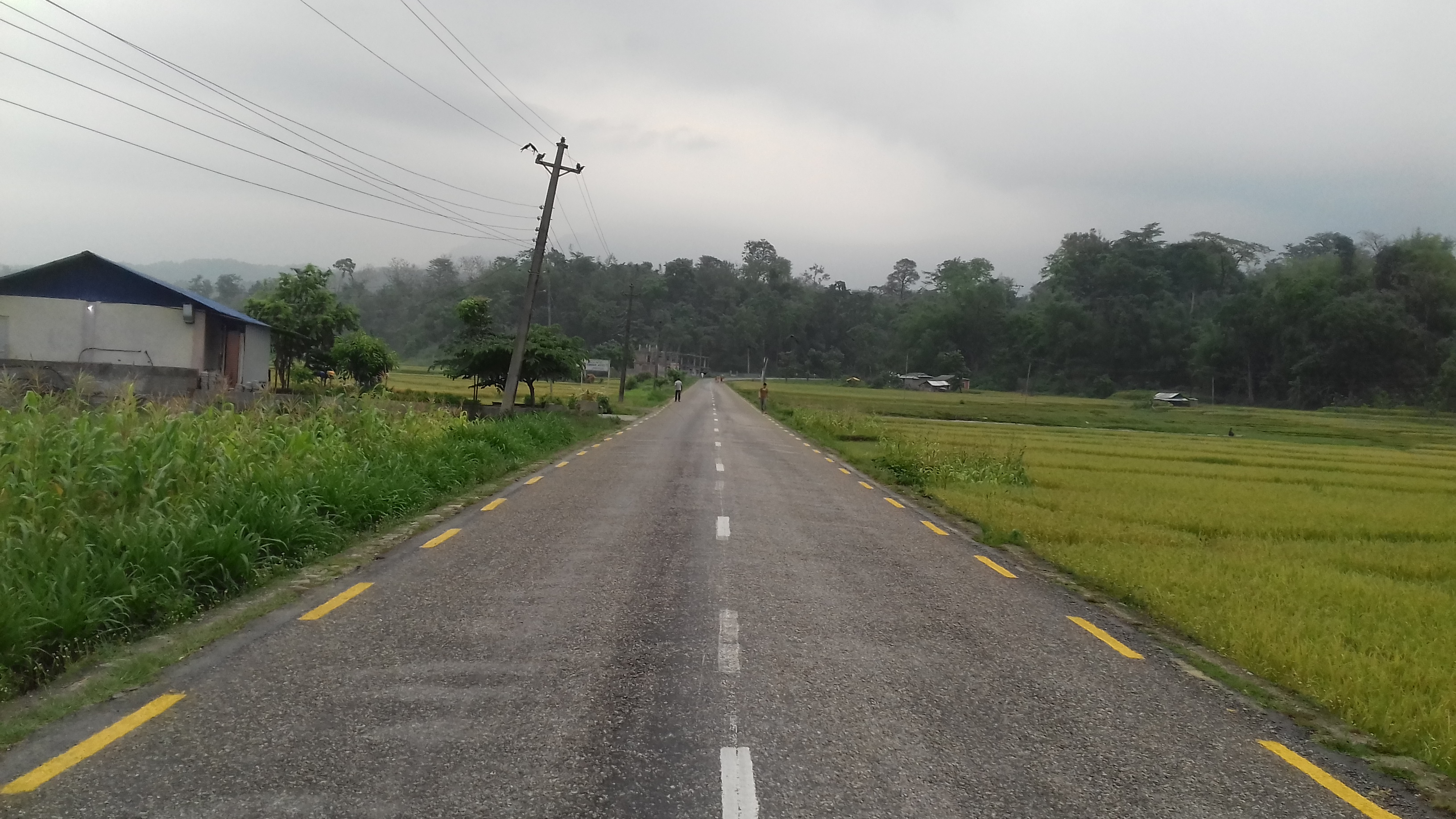
Part of Mechi Highway near Budhabare, Jhapa

Mechi Highway or NH02 (previously: H07) (Nepali: मेची राजमार्ग) is a two-lane freeway in Koshi Province, spanning about 268 kilometers in length. The highway connects all the districts of former Mechi zone, hence the name Mechi. It runs from the Village Development Committee of Kechana in Jhapa district in the south to the remote north of Taplejung through the district of Ilam. The main destinations along the highway include Kechana, Baniyani, Prithivinagar, Bhadrapur, Duhagadhi, Budhabare, Kanyam and Phikkal. The highway shares a junction with Mahendra Highway at Charali.

The Mechi Highway extends from the Terai region of Nepal to the high Himalayas, connecting India in the south and China in the north. It starts from Kechana Kawal in the Terai region, crosses the Shivalik Hills, passes through the lower Himalayas and reaches the high Himalayan region bordering China.

== See also ==
- Roads in Nepal
- Koshi Highway
- Sagarmatha Highway
