= Chabbise =

Settlement located between India and Nepal

- Location within Koshi Province Location within Nepal Location within South Asia

Highest point
- Elevation: 1,948 m (6,391 ft)
- Coordinates: 26°55′22.5″N 88°08′39″E

Geography
- Location: Suryodaya, Ilam District, Koshi Province, Nepal; Mirik subdivision, Darjeeling, India

Chhabbise (or Chabbise) is a small settlement located between India and Nepal. It is located between Suryodaya Municipality of Ilam District of Nepal and Mirik subdivision of Darjeeling District of India. It is a hilly town located in 1948 m of elevation. There is a custom office and a BOP at the Nepal side of the border. NH11 connects this settlement with Phikkal Bazar and other parts of the country. There is a SH12 Highway Indian side of the border which connects the settlement with Mirik and other parts of India.
