= Gairigaun, Nepal =

Village in Nepal

Gairigaun is a village located near Phikkal Bazar, Nepal. It was known as Phikkal-3 and now it is Suryodaya Municipality-9. Most of the villagers are depended on Agriculture and are Middle Classed.
