= Budhabare, Jhapa =

Hadiya Budhabare हडिया बुधवारे
- Village of Buddhashanti Rural Municipality
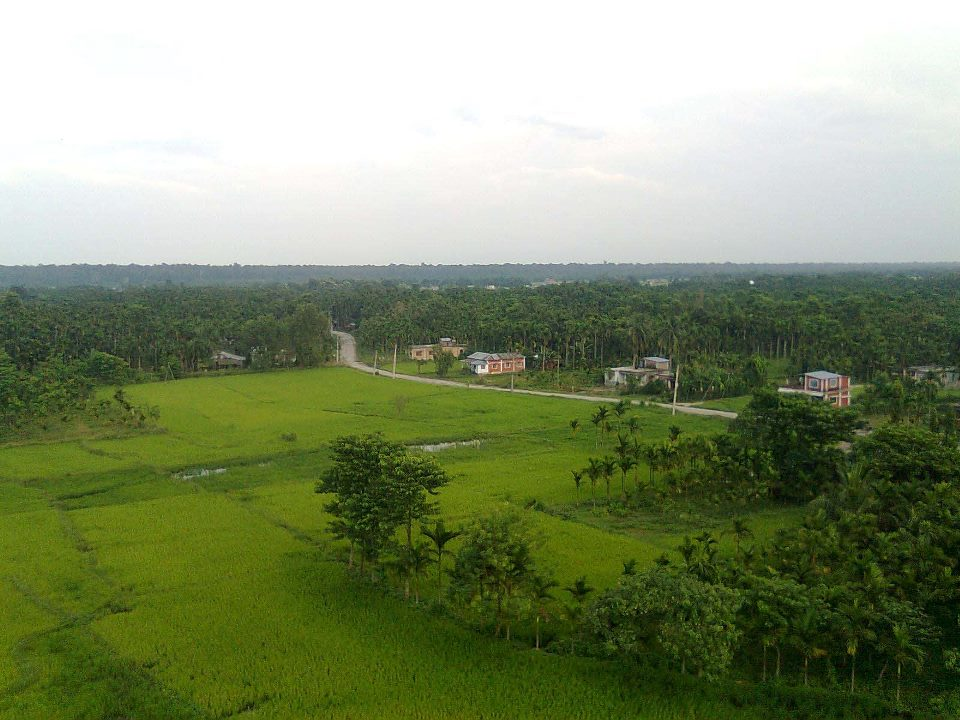
- Bird's eye view of part of Budhabare

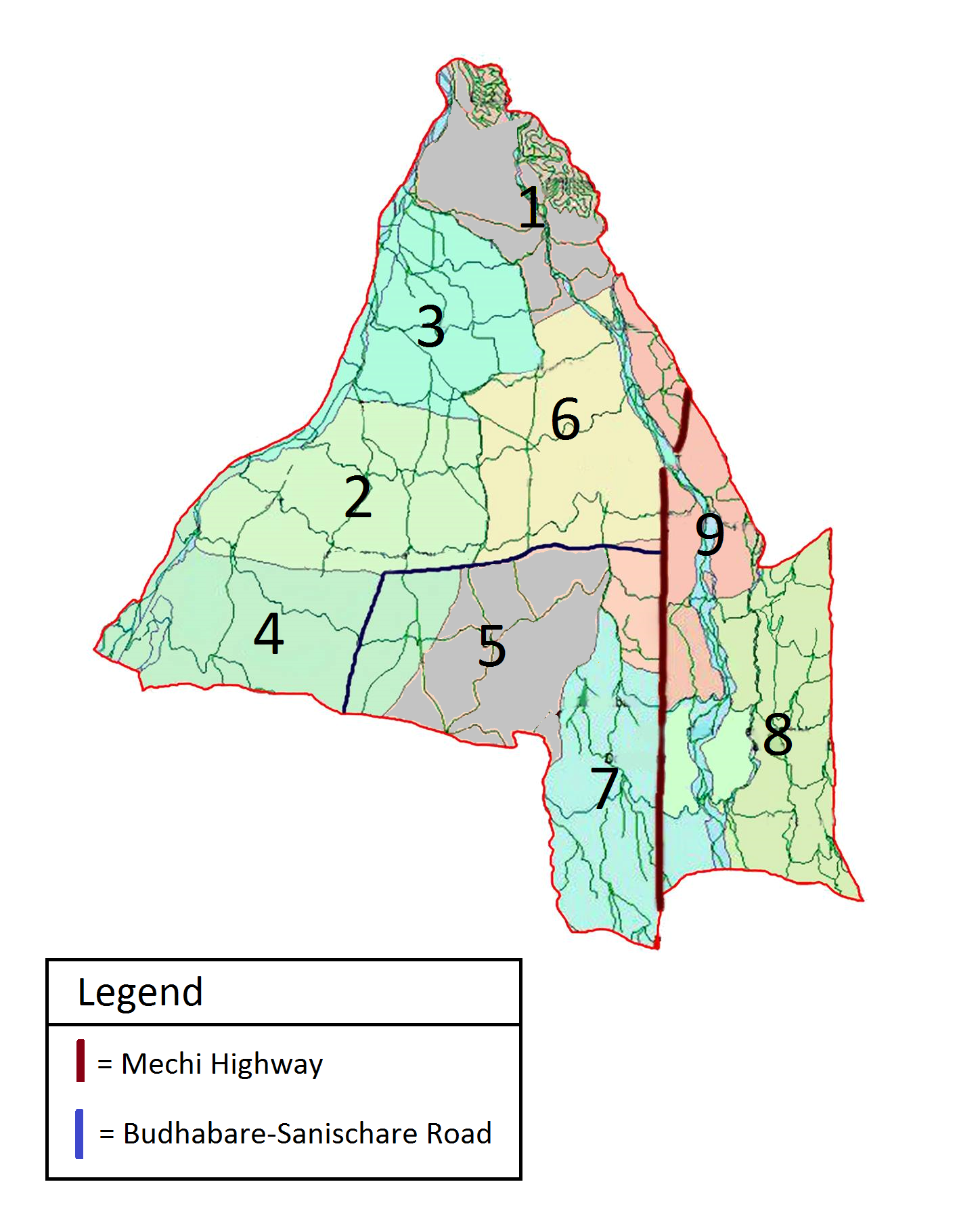
- Map of Budhabare depicting its constituent wards

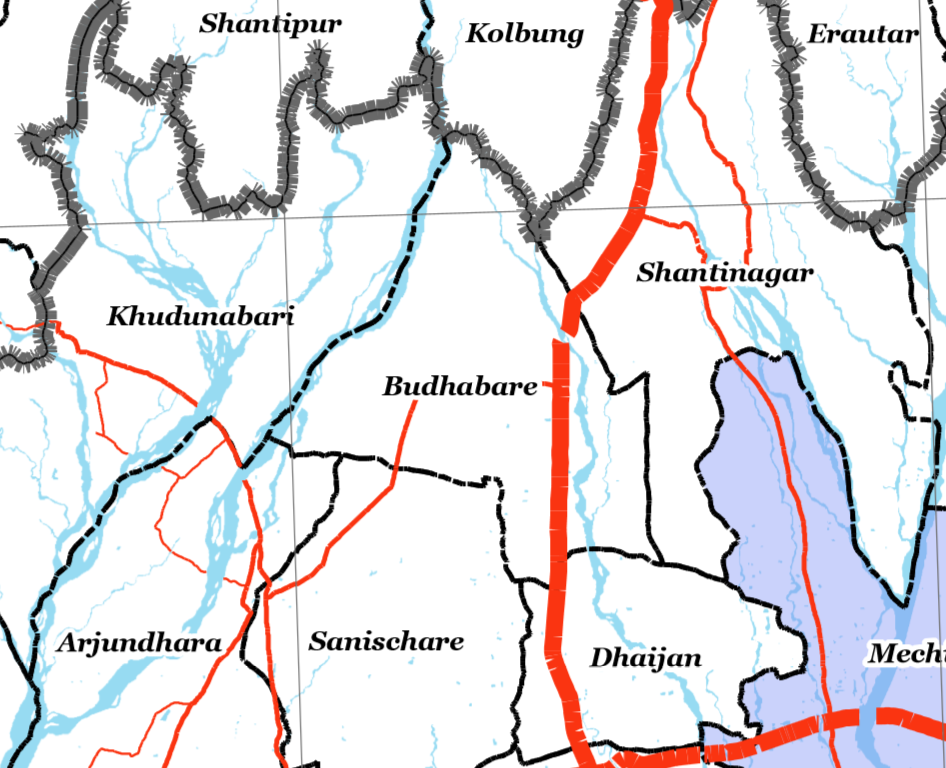
- Zoomed-in map of Jhapa district showing Budhabare and its adjacent areas

- Location in Nepal
- Coordinates: 26.723838°N 88.050179°E
- Country: Nepal
- Province: Province No. 1
- District: Jhapa

Area
  - Total: 31.73 km^{2} (12.25 sq mi)
- Highest elevation: 329 m (1,079 ft)
- Lowest elevation: 149 m (489 ft)

Population (2011)
  - Total: 22,936
  - Density: 722.85/km^{2} (1,872.2/sq mi)
  - Ethnicities: Brahmin Chhetri Kami Limbu Rai
- Demonym: Budhabarebasi
- Time zone: UTC+5:45 (NST)
- A.P.O.: 57206
- PSTN: 555

Budhabare, more specifically Hadiya Budhabare, is a village and former Village Development Committee that is now part of Buddhashanti Rural Municipality in Jhapa district of Province No. 1 in south-eastern Nepal. The latest official data, 2011 Nepal Census, puts the total population of the VDC at 22,936. Owing to this average population size, the VDC has been divided into nine wards.

As the village is crossed by Hadiya Khola, it is sometimes also referred to as Hadiya Budhabare. The village of Budhabare is best known for two things: the production of betelnut and the market that is held every Wednesday. The market of Budhabare grew in importance tremendously after the highway to Ilam was constructed, as Budhabare now lies along the Mechi Highway, which connects all the districts of Mechi zone.

== Etymology ==
The origin of the name budhabare dates back to the early 1940s. Local legend has it that, at that time, an elite man by the name of Somhorse Karki began to organize a weekly market day, or hatiya, in the village. This followed a similar trend that was already in practice on Saturday in Sanischare, on Sunday in Aaitabare, on Friday and Monday in Dhulabari, and on Thursday in Phikkal. Out of fears that a concurrent market day would be detrimental and challenging to business, they decided go with either Tuesday or Wednesday. As Tuesday is generally considered a kharobar, or brute day, in Nepali culture, Wednesday became the pick. Over time, the village came to be known after this day of the market as Budhabare, since Budhabar is the Nepali term for Wednesday. This market, which started off in the early 1940s, still continues to this day and has become a major attraction of the village.

== Geography ==
Budhabare is located in Buddhashanti Rural Municipality, at a distance of 17 km north from district headquarters Bhadrapur and 8 km north of Charali along the Mechi Highway. Geographically, Budhabare covers a total area of 31.73 square kilometres. Pahari Chowk (roughly the center of Budhabare) lies at a latitude of 26.723838°N and longitude of 88.050179°E. The elevation of Budhabare ranges from 149 m to 329 m above the mean sea level. The dominant tree species found in the area include Shorea robusta (locally known as sal), Acacia catechu (khayar), Dalbergia sissoo (sisau), and Neolamarckia cadamba (kadam).

== Climate ==
Since the village lies in the flanks of Terai just below the hills, the climate of Budhabare is temperately warm. Under the Köppen–Geiger classification, Budhabare has a humid subtropical climate (Cwa) with wet and hot summers and mild and dry winters. With reference to statistics furnished by climate-data.org, the average temperature of Budhabare is 24.2 °C. About 2500 mm of precipitation falls annually. The driest month is December with little to no rainfall. Meanwhile, in July, the precipitation reaches its peak with an average of 719 mm.

== Geology ==
Topographically, Budhabare area lies in the upper Terai region of the Indo-Gangetic plains, almost on the foot of the Siwalik hills. It is generally flat in the south, while the northern part is rolling. The area is dissected by two major streams: Biring Khola and Hadiya Khola. Biring Khola runs from north to south along the western border, serving as a natural demarcation between Budhabare and Khudnabari. Hadiya Khola also runs from north to south, but close to the eastern border. The area close to the two streams is mainly composed of gravel, boulder, and sand. However, the rest and much of Budhabare is primarily composed of silty loamy soil, which is ideal for agriculture.

== Demographics ==
As per the National Population and Housing Census 2011, the total population of the village stands at 22,936, with a male population of 10,938 and a female population of 11,998. In terms of percentage, males constitute some 47.69% and females constitute about 52.31% of the total population. Likewise, the sex ratio is 91.17, which means there are about 91 males for every 100 females in the VDC. The total number of households in the village is 5,270, with an average household size of 4.35. Moreover, the population density of the VDC comes to be around 723 persons per square kilometer, which is about fourfold higher than the national population density.

=== Age structure ===
The active population of the VDC is 14,415, which is about 63.29% of the total population. The table immediately below enumerates the population composition of the village on the basis of child dependent, economically active, and old dependent age-group respectively:

Age Group	Population	Percentage
0-14	6,170	26.90%
15-59	14,515	63.29%
60+	2251	9.81%

=== Ethnicity ===
Brahmins who have descended from hills make up about 43.22% of Budhabare's populace. Similarly, Chhetri, Kami, Limbu, Rai, Newar, etc. are also fairly common ethnic groups found in the village. In addition, minority groups residing in the village include Tharu, Muslims, Majhi, Bengali, etc. The table below mentions the major ethnic groups and bulks the minorities into "others," summing up the population composition of Budhabare on ethnicity basis:

Ethnic Group	Population	Percentage
Brahmins (Hill)	9,913	43.22%
Chhetri	2,542	11.08%
Kami	1,458	6.36%
Limbu	1,403	6.12%
Rai	1,143	4.98%
Newar	1,063	4.63%
Damai/Dholi	733	3.20%
Tamang	593	2.58%
Magar	587	2.56%
Dhimal	582	2.54%
Rajbansi	467	2.04%
Others	2,452	10.69%

=== Language ===
An overwhelming majority of village population (82.68%) speak Nepali as mother tongue. Other spoken languages include Limbu (4.06%), Dhimal (2.02%), Rai (1.88%), etc. The table below enumerates all languages that at least have a three-digit population:

Mother Tongue	Population	Percentage
Nepali	18,963	82.68%
Limbu	932	4.06%
Dhimal	464	2.02%
Rai	432	1.88%
Tamang	329	1.43%
Newari	300	1.31%
Rajbansi	299	1.30%
Maithili	287	1.25%
Magar	173	0.75%
Tharu	125	0.54%
Bhojpuri	108	0.47%
Others	524	2.28%

== Education ==
As of 2011 Nepal Census, Budhabare has a male literacy rate of 85.77% and a female literacy rate of 74.34%. Overall, the literacy rate of the village stands at 79.76%, which is higher than the national average of 65.9%. There are more than a dozen of schools operating in and around the Budhabare area, and all of them are co-educational. In addition to schools, a private campus by the name of Sita Ramesh Bahumukhi Campus has also been recently established in Budhabare-6, and offers graduate programs in commerce and humanities.

== Facilities and services ==
Budhabare is moderately facilitated. For health services, there is a health post located near Budhabare bazaar, which provides basic health care facilities to the local population. In addition to this health post, there also exists an Ayurveda aushadhalaya, which renders basic ayurvedic health facilities. The area has good access to road transport. The Mechi Highway, which connects all the districts of the Mechi zone, runs through the village. It has a network of part black topped and part graveled road within its area. Most areas are thus easily accessible.

== Economic activities ==
The primary economic activity of the village is agriculture. The land is very fertile and the rate of production is good, making this place an "agricultural hotspot" of Jhapa district. Food crops like paddy and maize are extensively cultivated. Most of the households plant betelnuts, which is the most popular cash crop in the area. Rubber, tea, and cardamom farms are also sparingly common. As for the industries, most of the industries are small-scale and agro-based. There are 30 rice mills and over 12 timber mills in the village. Moreover, a significant fraction of village's active population works abroad, especially in the Gulf countries, and foreign remittances contribute a great deal to the local economy.

== Religious sites ==
Budhabare is home to numerous temple sites that are sacred to Hindu devotees. Pilgrims and worshippers from all over the village and other places flock to these religious spaces during special occasions. Some of the eminent holy places located across the several wards of the village include:

- Ram Janaki Temple, Budhabare-9
- Shree Krishna Pranami Mandir, Budhabare-6
- Laxmi Narayan Mandir, Budhabare-6
- Kamleshwar Mahadev Mandir, Budhabare-5
- Shree Hanuman Mandir, Budhabare-9
- Sitala Devi Mandir, Budhabare-5

== Gallery ==
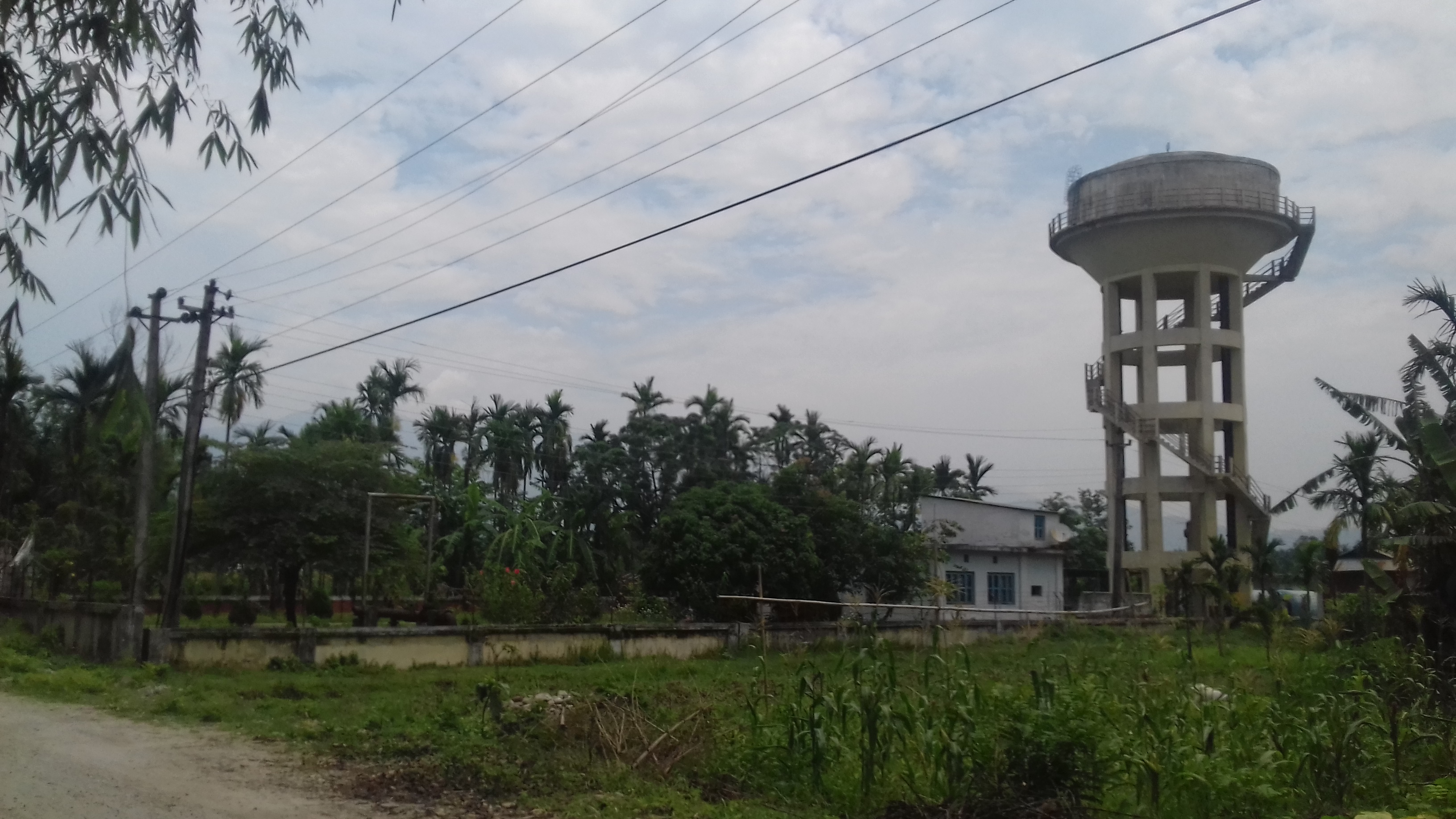
View of the water reservoir tower that was built as part of Small Town Drinking Water and Sanitation Project

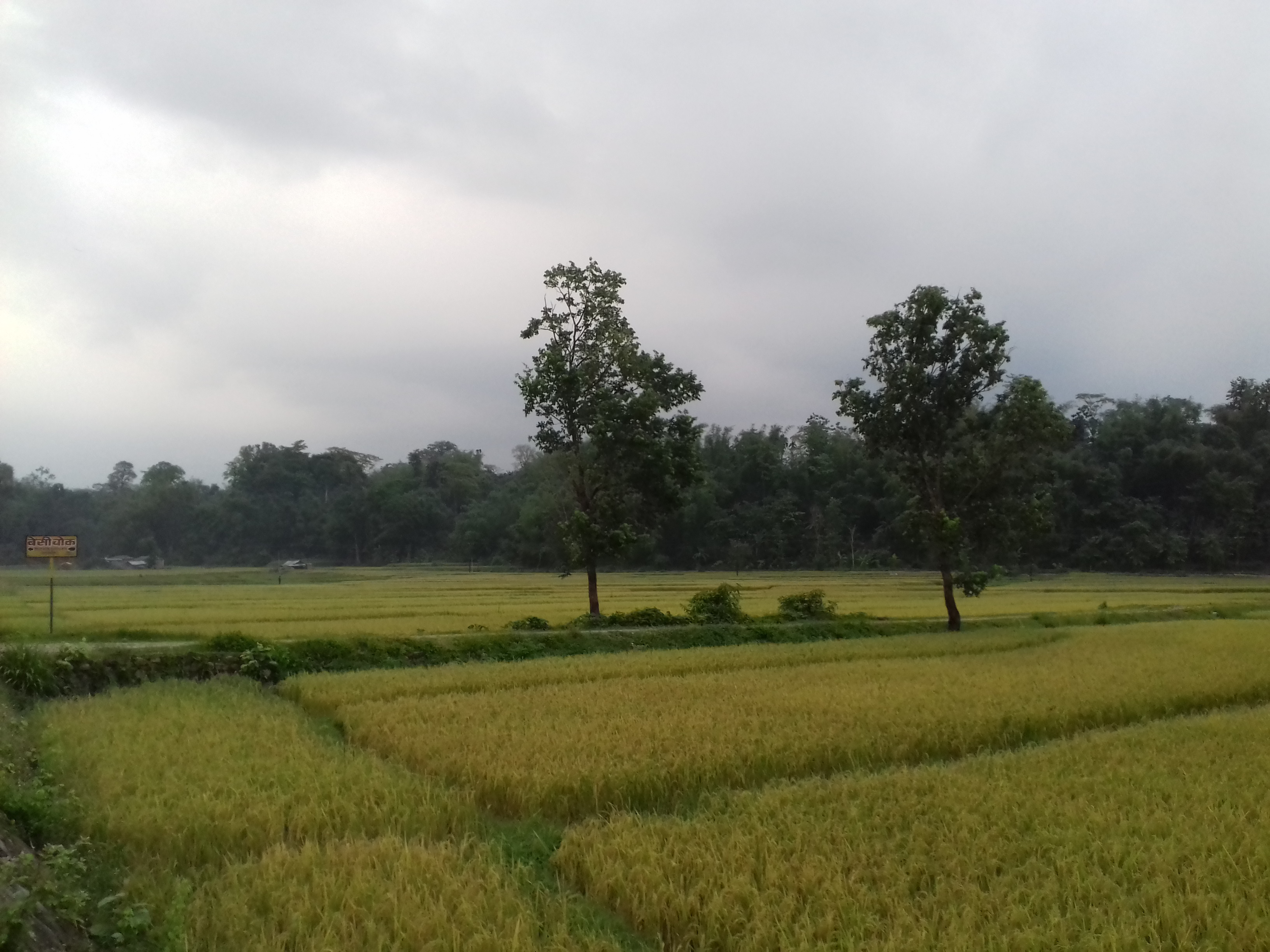
Farmlands of Hattisude, Budhabare-9, as seen at the crack of dawn. Locals believe Hattisude to be one of the most fertile places for the production of rice in Jhapa and even across the country.

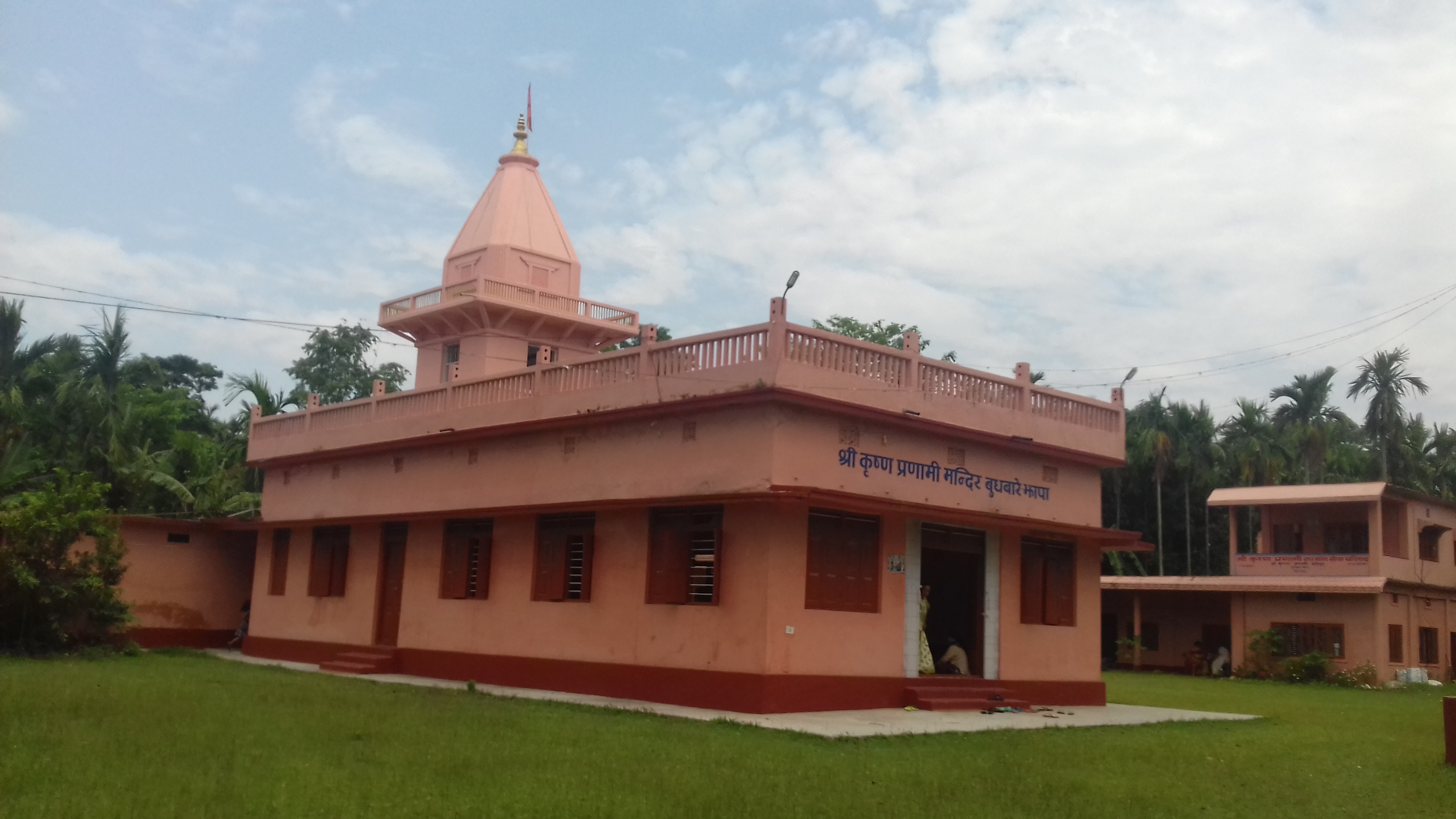
Located in Budhabare-6, Shree Krishna Pranami Mandir is an important religious site in and around the Budhabare area.

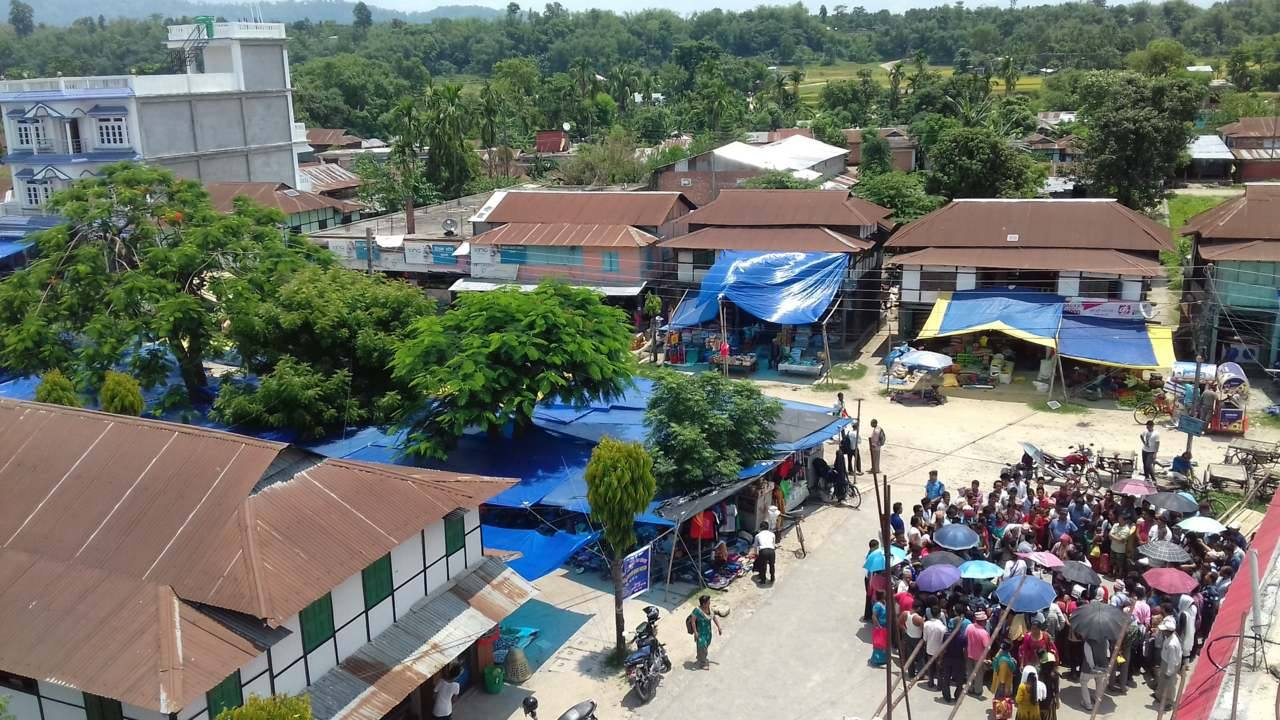
People gather to observe a street play on a Wednesday in the bazaar area of Budhabare. Street plays like this usually carry with them a social message, and this one is on "Domestic Violence Against Women."

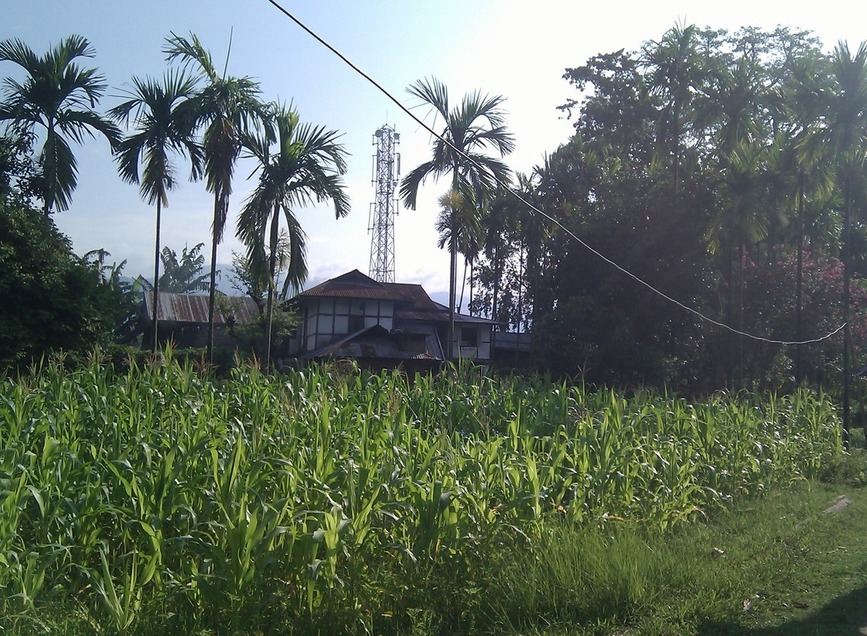
A village scene of Budhabare with maize plants and betelnut trees

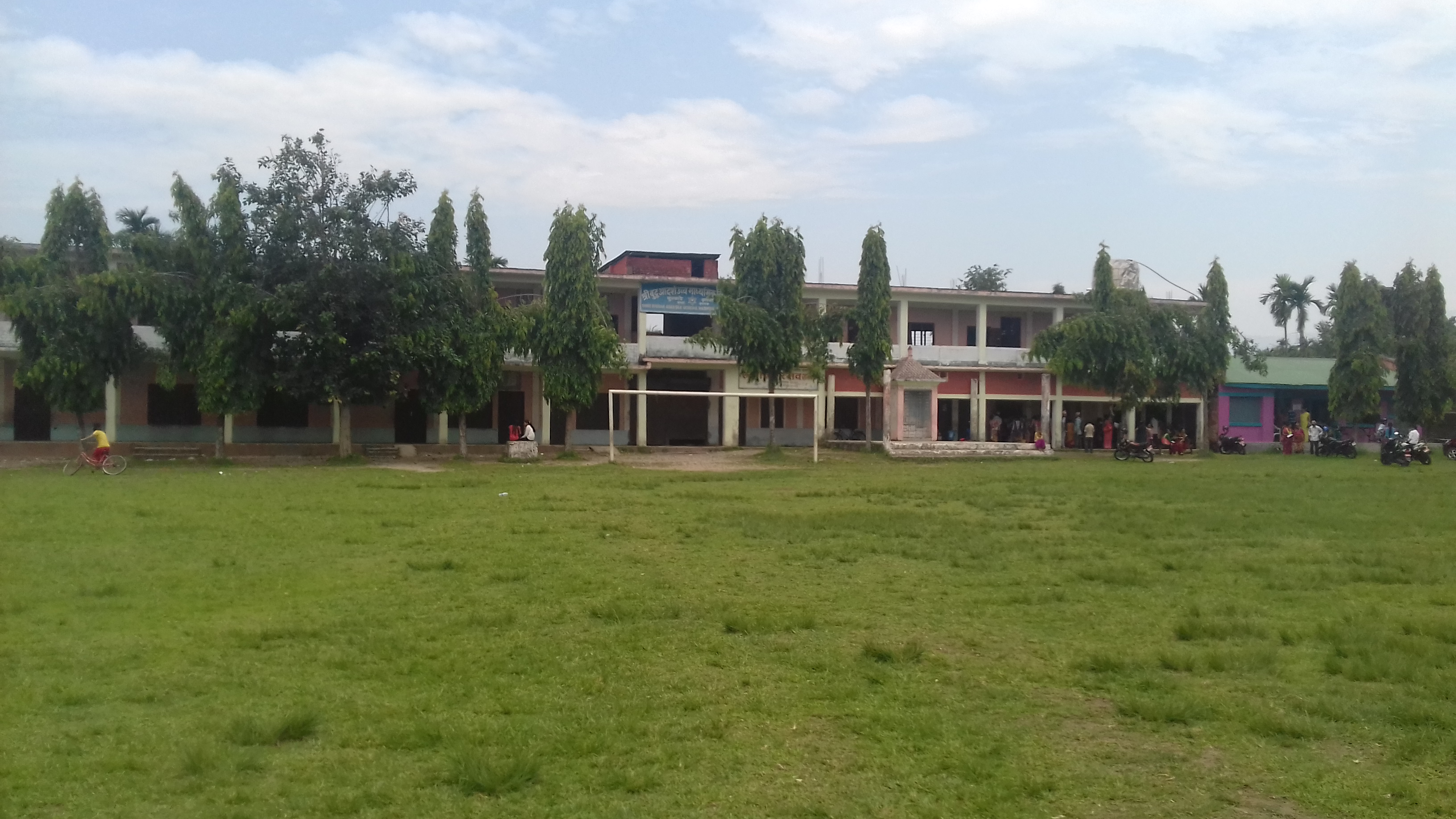
Distant shot of Shree Buddha Adarsha Uccha Madhyamik Vidyalaya, the oldest educational institution in the village

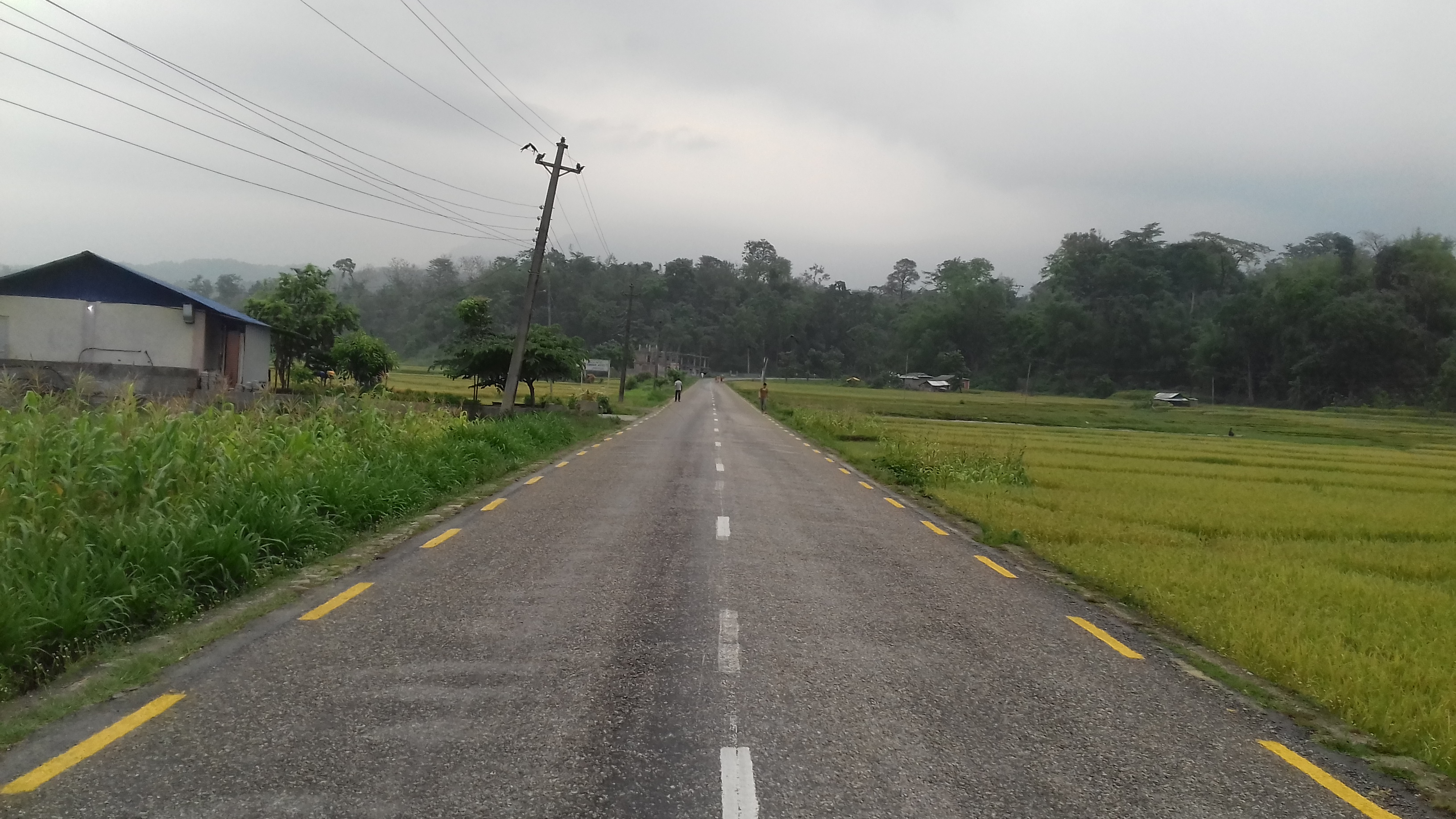
Part of Mechi Highway that passes through the village of Budhabare
