= National Highway 11 (Nepal) =

Highway in Nepal

Phikkal-Chabbise Highway फिक्कल-छब्बीसे राजमार्ग
- राष्ट्रिय राजमार्ग ११
- National Highway 11
- NH11 in red

Route information
- Maintained by MoPIT (Department of Roads)
- Length: 19 km (12 mi)

Major junctions
- East end: Chabbise
- Thulo Shribun
- West end: Phikkal Bazar

Location
- Country: Nepal
- Provinces: Koshi Province
- District: Ilam

Highway system
- Roads in Nepal
← NH10	→ NH12

NH11 or Phikkal-Chabbise road is a short National Highway of Nepal located in Koshi Province. The total length of the highway is just 19 kilometres (12 mi) and the whole section is located in Ilam District. It starts from Phikkal Bazar and runs via Chhiruwa, Mechi Bazar and finalizes at Chabbise which is an Indo-Nepal border located at the elevation of 1948 m. The road is connected with Indian State Highway SH12 (WB) at the other side of the border. NH11 is connected with NH02 at Phikkal Bazar.

== Links ==
- SNH 2020-2021
- https://dor.gov.np
