= Panchakanya (disambiguation) =

Panchakanya or Panchkanya may refer to:

Panchkanya (पञ्चकन्या):

- Panchakanya: five heroines in Hindu epics (Ahalya, Draupadi, Kunti, Tara and Mandodari)
- Panchkanya, Nuwakot, Nepal

Panchakanya (पाँचकन्या):

- Panchakanya, Kosi, Nepal
- Panchakanya, Mechi, Nepal
- Panchakanya Pokhari, Nepal
