= National Highway 10 (Nepal) =

Highway in Nepal

Deurali-Mudhe-Bohoratar Highway देउराली-मुढे-बोहोराटार राजमार्ग
- राष्ट्रिय राजमार्ग १०
- National Highway 10
- NH10 in red line

Route information
- Maintained by MoPIT (Department of Roads)
- Length: 92 km (57 mi)
- Existed: 2010–present
- History: BT

Major junctions
- North end: Bohoratar
- Mudhe, Chainpur Bazar
- South end: Deurali

Location
- Country: Nepal
- Provinces: Koshi Province
- District: Sankhuwasabha

Highway system
- Roads in Nepal
← NH09	→ NH11

NH10 or Deurali-Mudhe-Bohoratar Highway is a National Highway of Nepal located in Koshi Province. The whole section of the highway is in Sankhuwasabha District. The total length of the highway is 92 kilometres (57 mi). The road section starts from Deurali (on the border of Tehrathum District) and runs via Mudhe Sanishchare, Chainpur and finalizes merging with NH08 at Bohoratar.

NH10 was constructed as a Feeder road F053 (Basantpur-Mudhe-Khadbari road) by taking loan from ADB in 2010. In 2021-22 Department of Roads upgraded a section from Deurali to Bohoratar into NH10 which is 92 kilometres (57 mi) in total length. The road runs on the 2000+ meters of elevation on the lesser Himalayas.

== Links ==
- SNH 2020-2021
- https://dor.gov.np
