= Kanyam =

Village in Ilam, Nepal

Kanyam कन्याम
- neighbourhood
- Nickname: Queen of eastern Nepal
- Location within Nepal
- Coordinates: 27.1536°N 87.9336°E
- Country: Nepal
- Province: Koshi Province
- District: Ilam
- Area: Suryodaya Municipality
- Elevation: 1,570 m (5,150 ft)
- Time zone: UTC+5:45 (Nepal Time)

Kanyam (Nepali: कन्याम) is a town and a tourist destination located in Ilam District of Nepal. It comes under Suryodaya Municipality in Ilam District in Koshi Province of eastern Nepal.

Kanyam is known for its green tea garden and picnic spots. It is known as "queen of eastern Nepal" due to its natural environment. Every year thousands of tourists visit here because of its climate and greenery. People also come here for honeymoon and it is one of the top destinations for couples.Shree Antu is a popular tourist destination best known as the place to observe sunrise and is known for its tea gardens.

== Gallery ==
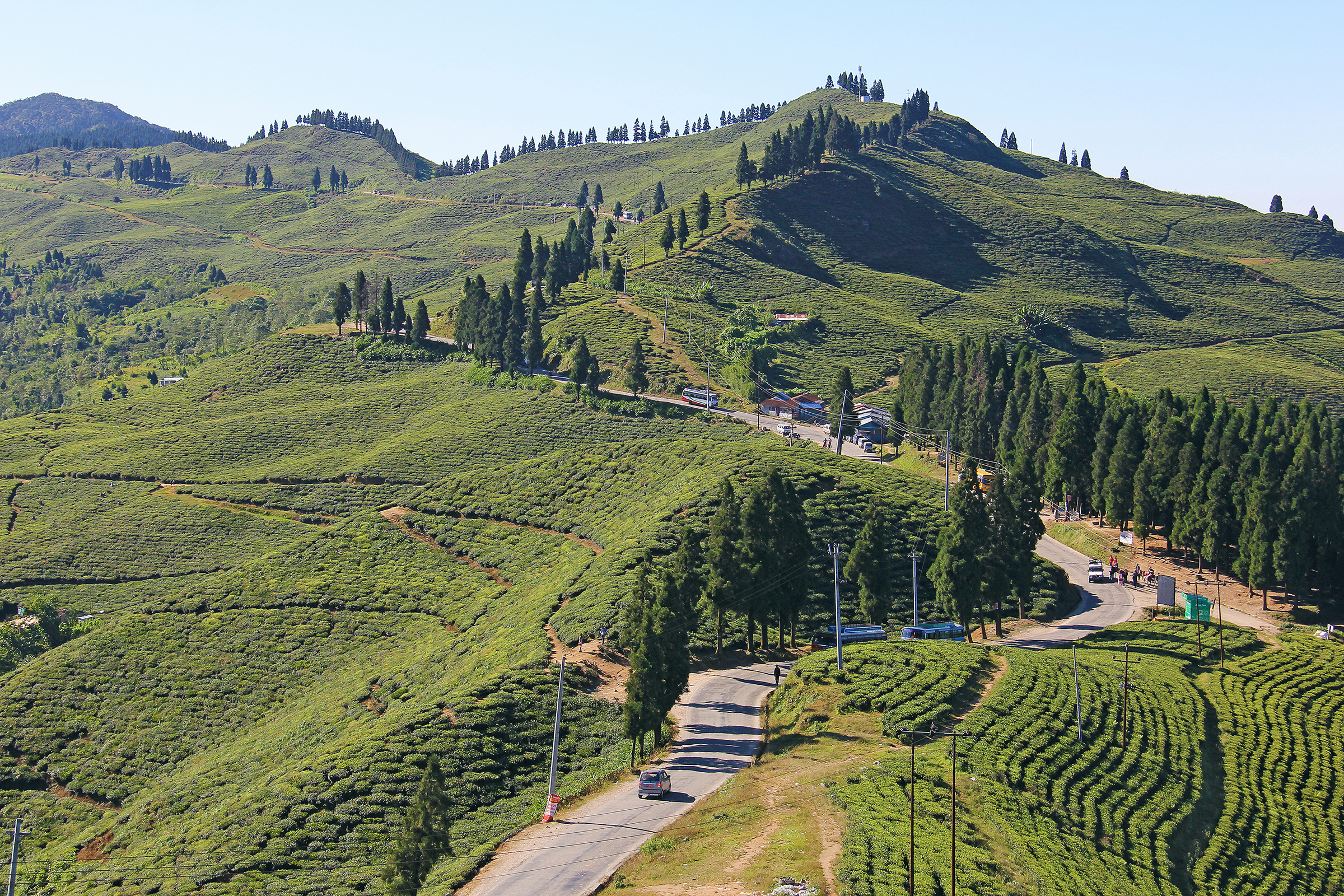
Kanyam

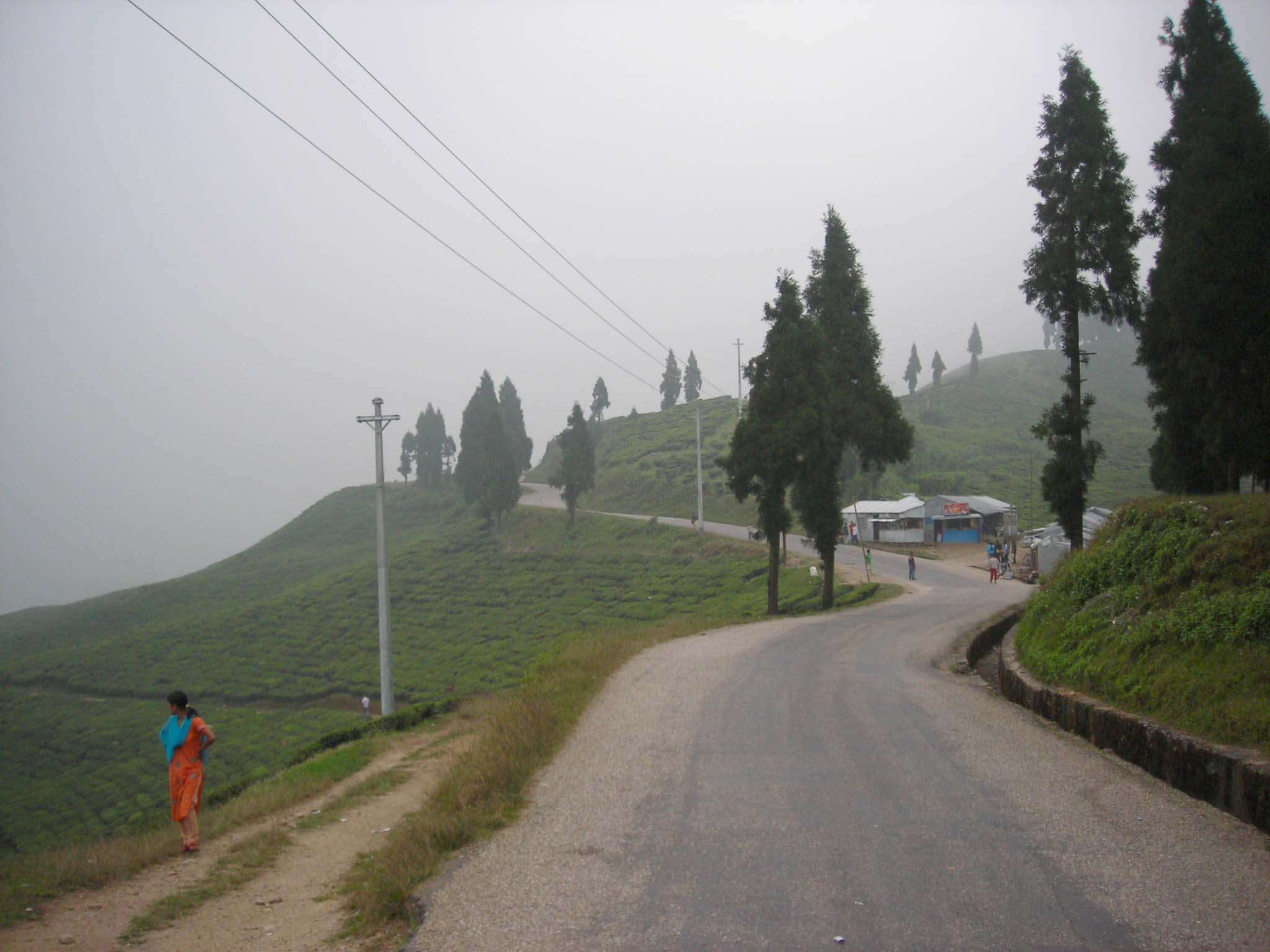
Kanyam seen from highway

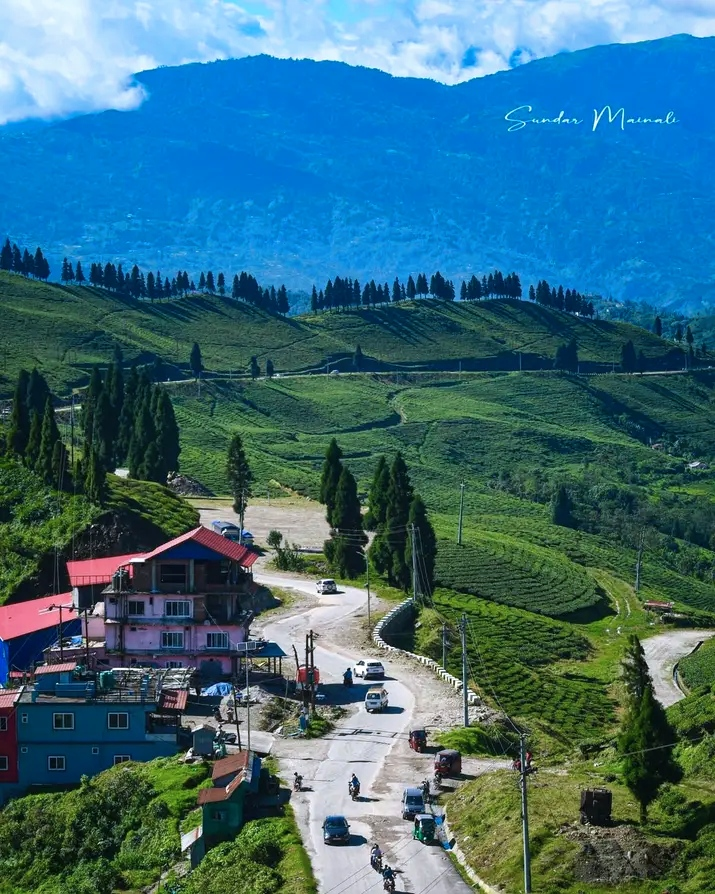
Kanyam, Ilam District, Koshi Province

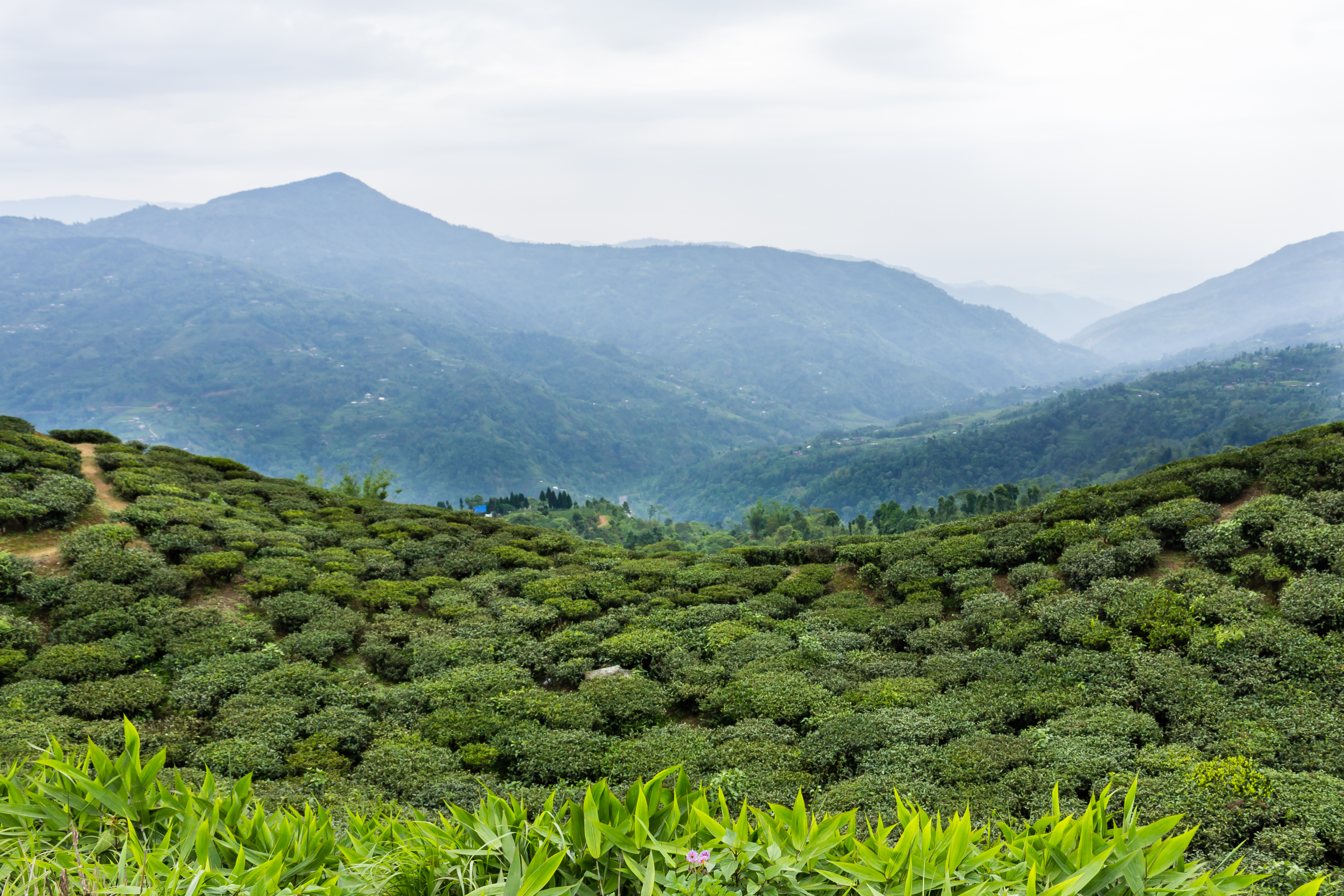
Kanyam Tea Garden

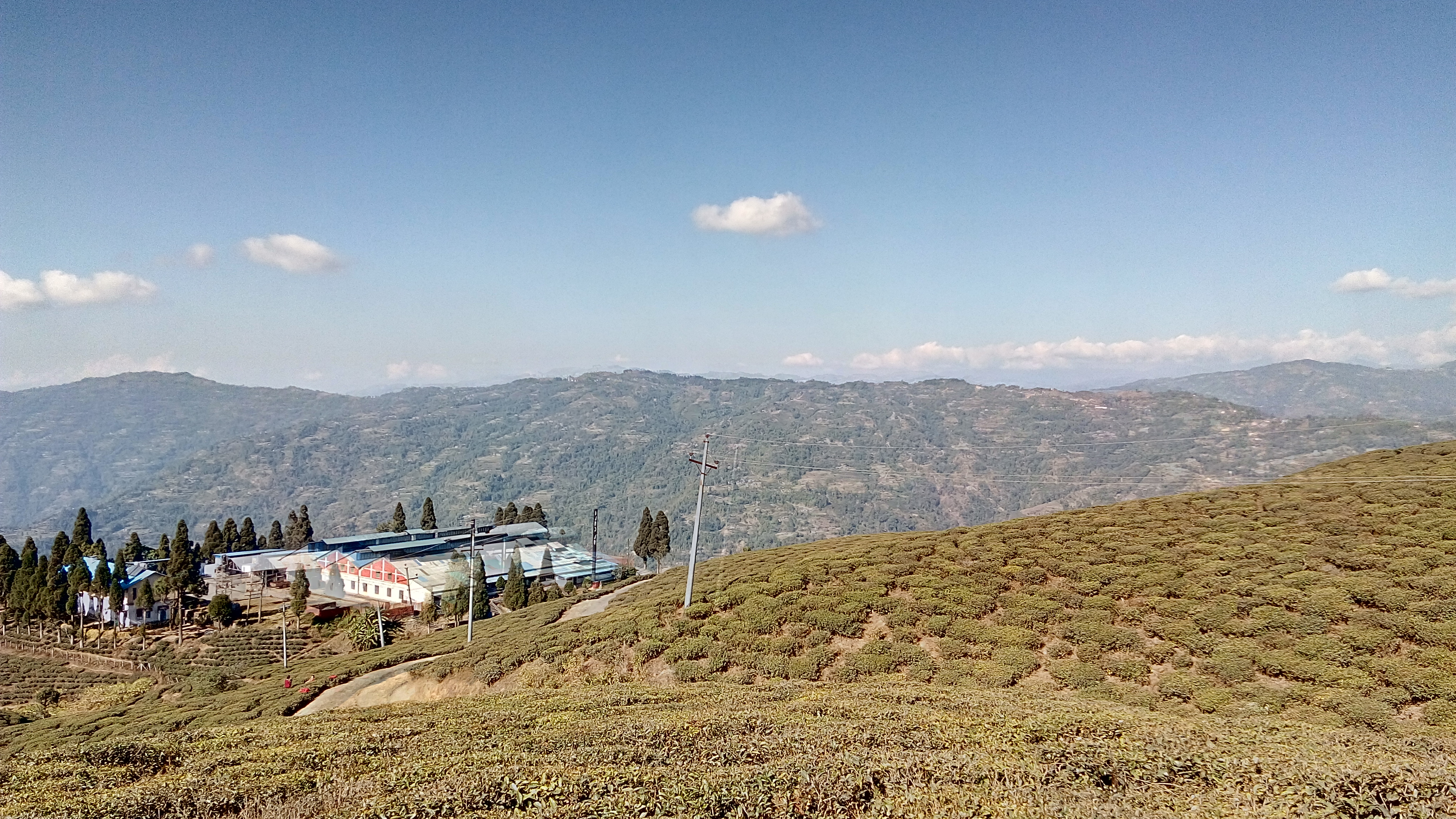
Tea Processing Factory

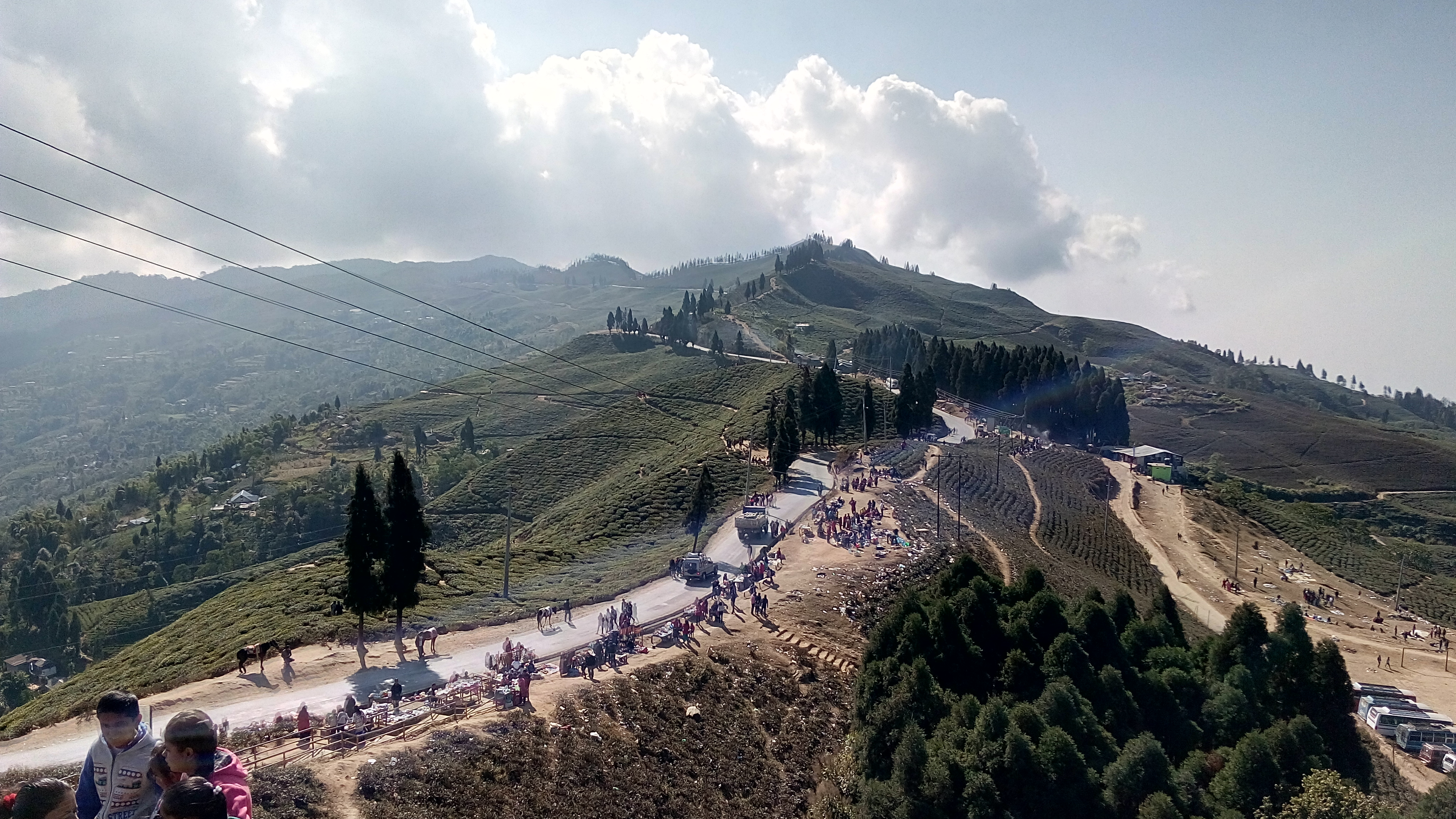
Roadways at Kanyam

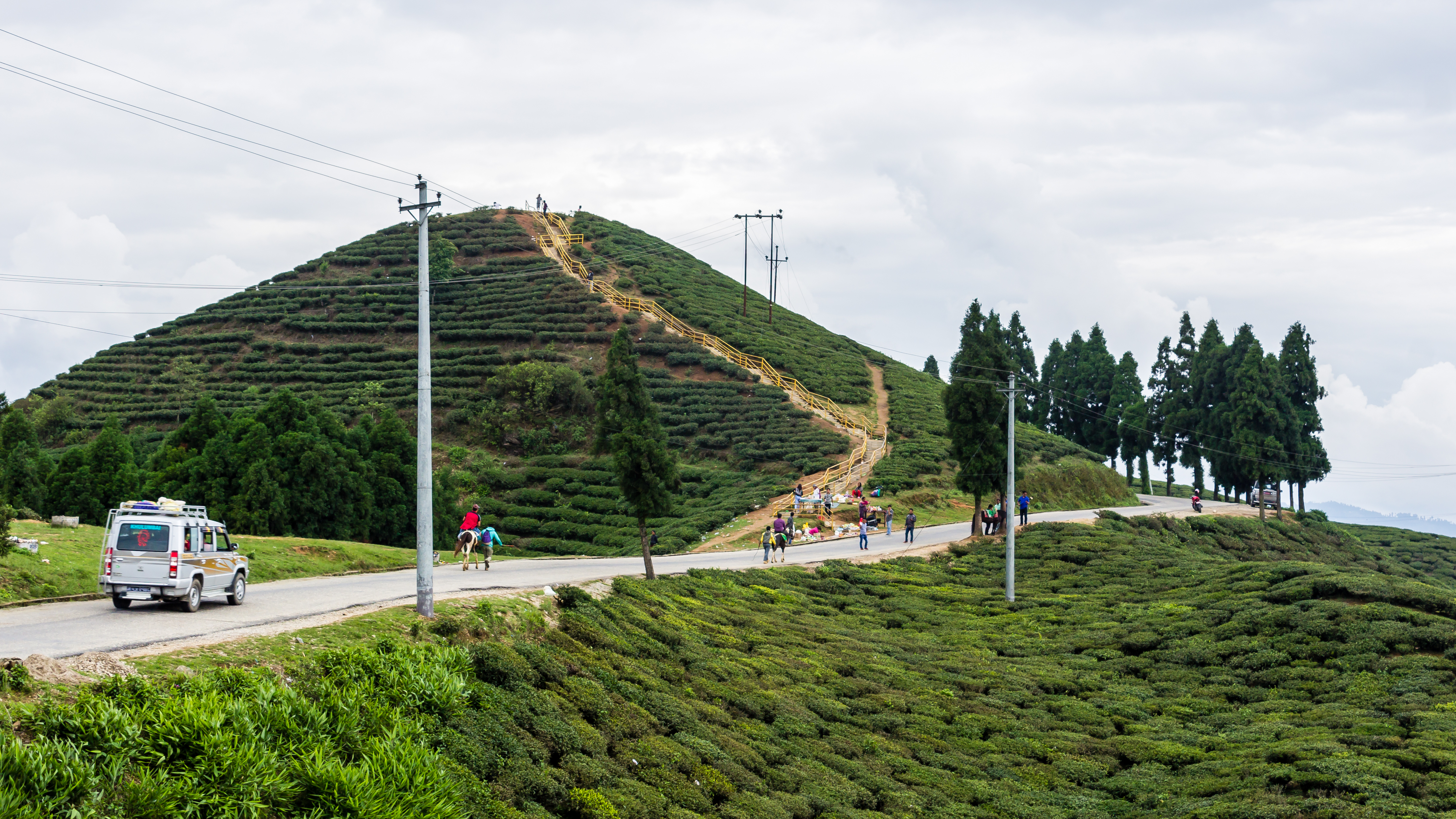
Kanyam Tea Garden

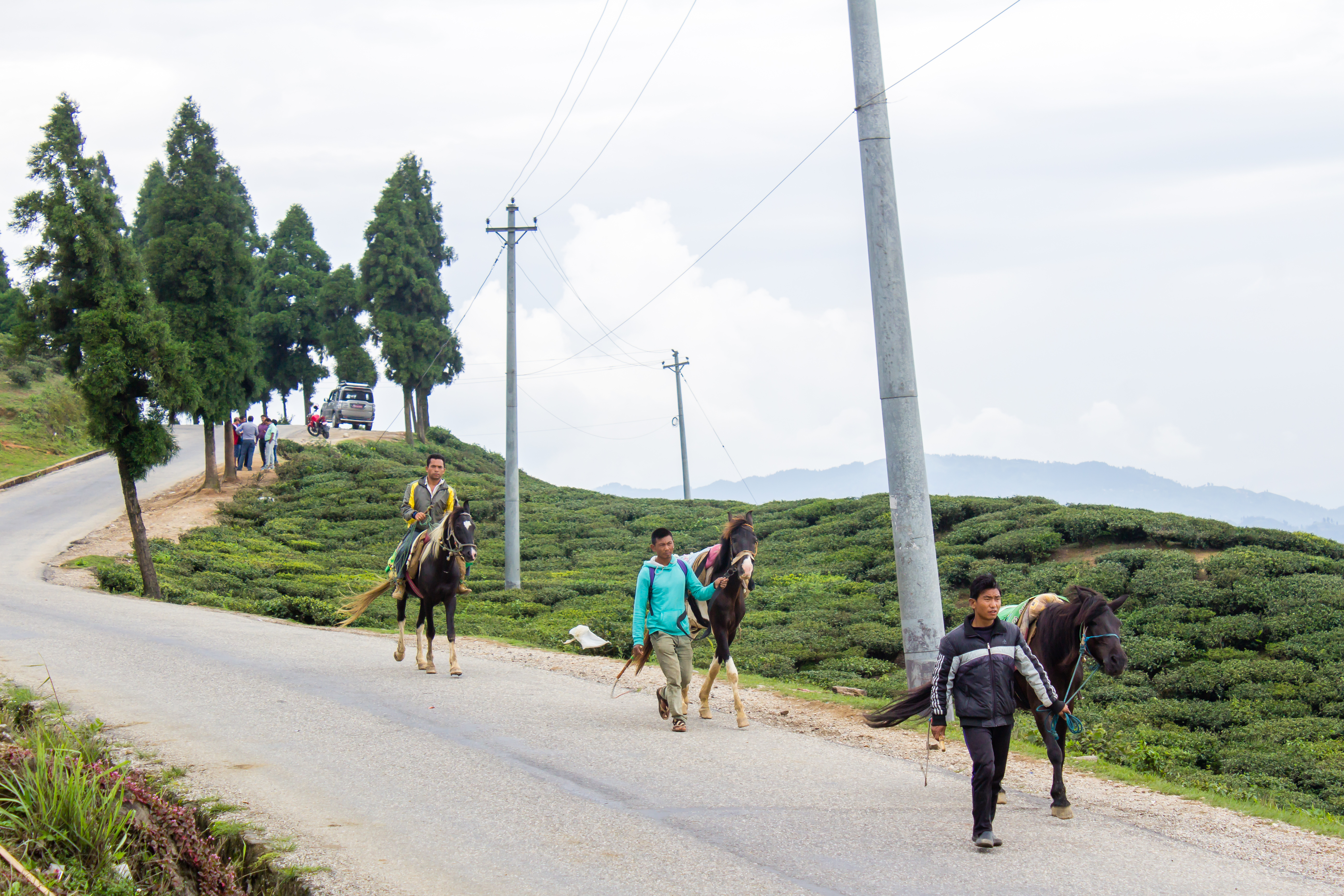
Horseriders, Kanyam

== See also ==
- Todke waterfall
- Mai Pokhari
