= Buddhashanti Rural Municipality =

Buddhashanti बुद्धशान्ति गाउँपालिका
- Rural Municipality
- Location in Koshi Province Buddhashanti (Nepal)
- Coordinates: 26.723838°N 88.050179°E
- Province: Koshi Province
- District: Jhapa
- Wards: 7
- Established: 10 March 2017
- Seat: Budhabare

Government
  - Type: Village Council
  - Chairperson: Mr.Manoj Prasai(NC)
  - Vice-chairperson: Mrs. Bhawani Prasad Khatiwada (CPN-UML)

Area
  - Total: 79.78 km^{2} (30.80 sq mi)

Population (2011)
  - Total: 41,615
  - Density: 521.6/km^{2} (1,351/sq mi)
- Time zone: UTC+5:45 (Nepal Standard Time)
- Website: official website

Buddhashanti (Nepali: बुद्धशान्ति गाउँपालिका) is one of the seven rural municipalities (gaunpalika) located in Jhapa District of Koshi Province of Nepal. Buddhashanti, according to Ministry of Federal Affairs and Local Development has an area of 79.78 square kilometres (30.80 mi^{2}) and the total population of the municipality is 41,615 as of the 2021 Census of Nepal.

Budhabare and Shantinagar which previously were all separate Village development committee merged to form this new local level body. Fulfilling the requirement of the new Constitution of Nepal 2015, Ministry of Federal Affairs and Local Development replaced all old VDCs and Municipalities into 753 new local level body (Municipality).

The rural municipality is divided into total 7 wards and the headquarter of this newly formed rural municipality is situated in Budhabare.

== Demographics ==
At the time of the 2011 Nepal census, Buddhashanti Rural Municipality had a population of 41,624. Of these, 72.9% spoke Nepali, 10.9% Limbu, 2.9% Rai, 2.3% Tamang, 1.8% Dhimal, 1.5% Magar, 1.3% Newar, 0.8% Maithili, 0.8% Tharu, 0.7% Rajbanshi, 0.4% Bantawa, 0.3% Bhojpuri, 0.3% Chamling, 0.3% Sherpa, 0.2% Danwar, 0.2% Gurung, 0.2% Kisan, 0.2% Kulung, 0.2% Lepcha, 0.2% Urdu, 0.1% Hindi, 0.1% Khaling, 0.1% Majhi, 0.1% Sunwar and 0.4% other languages as their first language.

In terms of ethnicity/caste, 34.8% were Hill Brahmin, 13.1% Limbu, 11.4% Chhetri, 6.9% Rai, 6.2% Kami, 3.9% Newar, 3.7% Tamang, 3.3% Magar, 2.5% Damai/Dholi, 2.1% Dhimal, 1.1% Rajbanshi, 1.0% Tharu, 0.9% Gharti/Bhujel, 0.8% Sarki, 0.8% Sunuwar, 0.7% Gurung, 0.7% Kumal, 0.6% other Dalit, 0.6% Sanyasi/Dasnami, 0.5% Terai Brahmin, 0.4% Musalman, 0.4% Sherpa, 0.3% Danuwar, 0.3% Teli, 0.2% Kisan, 0.2% Kulung, 0.2% Lepcha, 0.2% Majhi, 0.2% Pattharkatta/Kushwadiya, 0.2% other Terai, 0.1% Bengali, 0.1% Chamling, 0.1% Hajjam/Thakur, 0.1% Halwai, 0.1% Khawas, 0.1% Musahar, 0.1% Yakkha and 0.9% others.

In terms of religion, 75.8% were Hindu, 13.8% Kirati, 6.1% Buddhist, 2.5% Christian, 0.6% Prakriti, 0.5% Muslim and 0.7% others.

In terms of literacy, 77.4% could read and write, 2.3% could only read and 20.3% could neither read nor write.
