= Phikkal Bazar =

Coordinates: 26.9100°N 88.0800°E

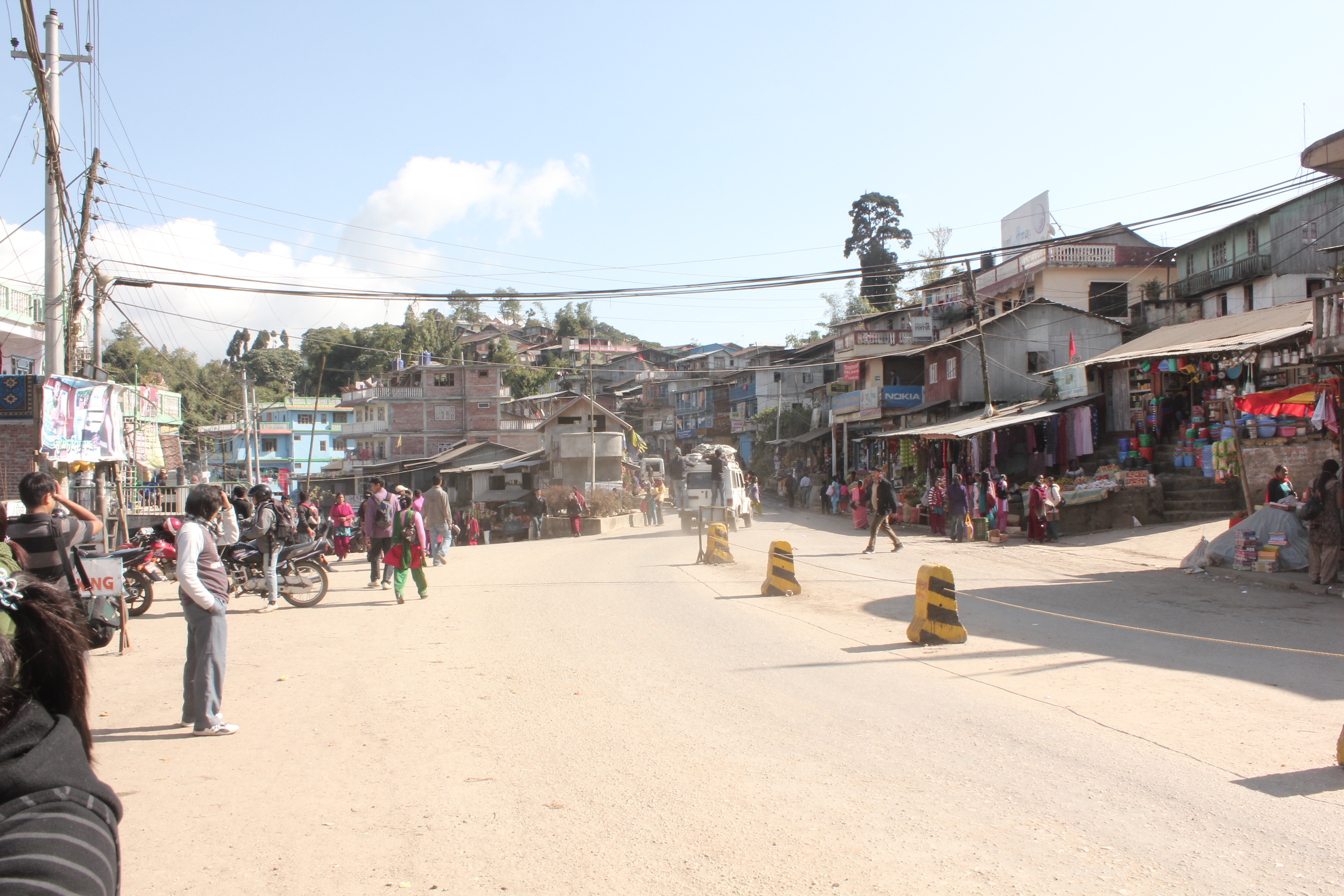
Phikkal Bazaar Chok

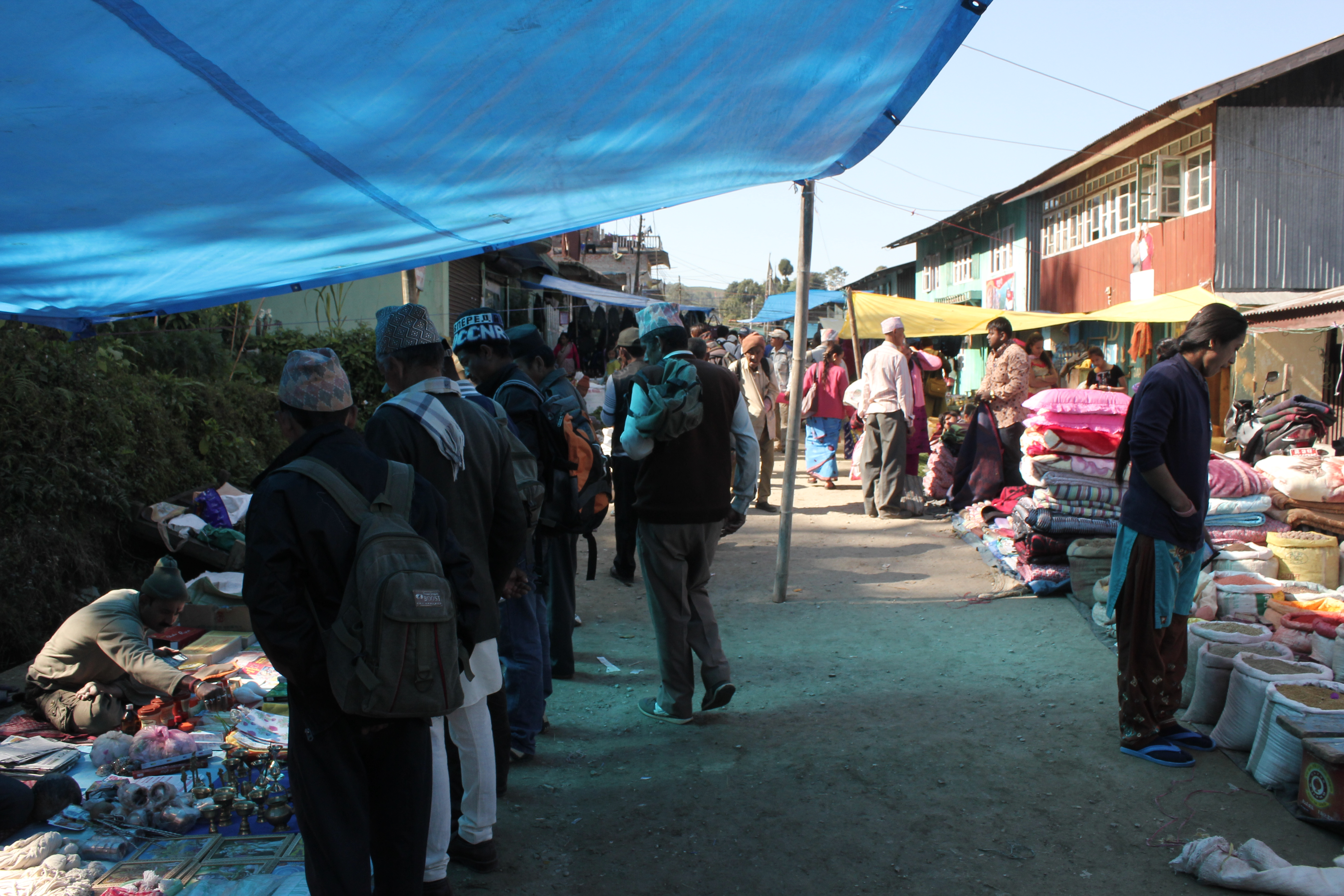
A weekly haat at Fikkal Bazaar, Nepal

Fikkal or Phikkal Bazar (Nepali: फिक्कल बजार) is a former Village Development Committee (VDC) and now a part of Suryodaya Municipality (ward no.-10) in Ilam District, Koshi Province, Nepal.

Fikkal Bazar is a business hub of eastern Ilam. It lies on the Mechi Highway. It is directly linked by road to Darjeeling, India, which sits 58 kilometres (36 mi) away. Tea leaf, processed tea, ginger, broomsticks, and cardamom are among the major trade items of this town. In 2014, Phikkal VDC was merged with Kanyam and Panchakanya to form the new Suryodaya Municipality.

Fikkal has a weekly Haat on Thursdays where local vendors and farmers gather to trade their products.

== Climate ==
Fikkal is perched at an altitude of approximately 1,500 meters (4,921 feet) above sea level, offering a moderate climate throughout the year. Summers are pleasant, with cool breeze sweeping through the hills, while winters bring a refreshing chill. The region experiences heavy monsoon rains, which enrich the soil and enhance the greenery, making it ideal for agriculture, especially tea cultivation.

The town is surrounded by forests, terraced farmland, and the sprawling Kanyam Tea Estate, one of Nepal's best-known tea-producing regions. The proximity to natural attractions like Antu Danda and Mai Pokhari has made Fikkal a destination for eco-tourism and cultural exploration.

== History ==
Fikkal’s history is closely tied to the development of tea cultivation in Nepal. During the late 19th and early 20th centuries, tea estates began flourishing in the Ilam region under the influence of British plantations in neighboring Darjeeling. Fikkal became a center for trade and transport, connecting local farmers and merchants with broader markets in the Terai plains and India. Over time, Fikkal evolved into a market town.

== Economy ==
Fikkal’s economy is primarily driven by agriculture and tea production, which are the backbone of the region. The tea grown in nearby estates like Kanyam, Pashupatinagar, and other Ilam plantations is exported internationally, contributing significantly to Nepal’s economy. Besides tea, the town thrives on the cultivation of cardamom, ginger, and vegetables, making it a crucial trading hub for local farmers.

Tourism also plays a role in Fikkal's economy. Visitors often visit nearby attractions, using Fikkal as a base. The influx of tourists has led to the growth of small businesses such as hotels, restaurants, and souvenir shops, boosting the local economy.

== Transport ==
Fikkal is located along the Mechi Highway, which links Ilam with the southern plains of Nepal and neighboring India. The town is approximately:

- 37 kilometers (23 miles) from Ilam Bazar, the district headquarters
- 40 kilometers (25 miles) from Birtamode, one of the main cities of Jhapa
- 40 kilometers (25 miles) from Darjeeling, India

Public buses, jeeps, and private vehicles operate frequently. The nearest airport is in Bhadrapur, with connections to Kathmandu and other major cities.

== Tourism ==
Kanyam Tea Estate Located just close to Fikkal, Kanyam is a tea garden known for its scenery and tea. Visitors can walk in tea plantations, learn about tea production, and see views of the surrounding hills. Kanyam is often referred to as the “Darjeeling of Nepal” due to its resemblance to its Indian counterpart.

Antu Danda A hilltop viewpoint situated about 15 kilometers from Fikkal, Antu Danda is known for its sunrise and sunset views. On clear days, visitors can see the Kangchenjunga, the third-highest mountain in the world, and parts of the eastern Himalayan range.

Mai Pokhari A UNESCO-recognized Ramsar site, Mai Pokhari is a sacred pond and biodiversity hotspot located about an hour's drive from Fikkal. Surrounded by dense forests, it is home to a variety of flora and fauna, including orchids and migratory birds.

Pashupatinagar Located near the Indo-Nepal border, Pashupatinagar is a historic trading post and a gateway for travelers heading to Darjeeling. The area is known for its culture and traditional handicrafts.

== Culture and community ==
Fikkal is a "melting pot" of ethnic and cultural diversity. The town is predominantly inhabited by Rai, Limbu, and Brahmin-Chhetri communities. Festivals like Dashain, Tihar, and the New Year celebrations of different ethnic groups are celebrated in the area.

The local cuisine reflects the agriculture of the area, with dishes like Gundruk (fermented leafy greens), Dhindo (traditional buckwheat porridge), and various tea-based delicacies being popular.
