= Shree Antu =

Shree Antu श्रीअन्तु Antu Hill
- Village
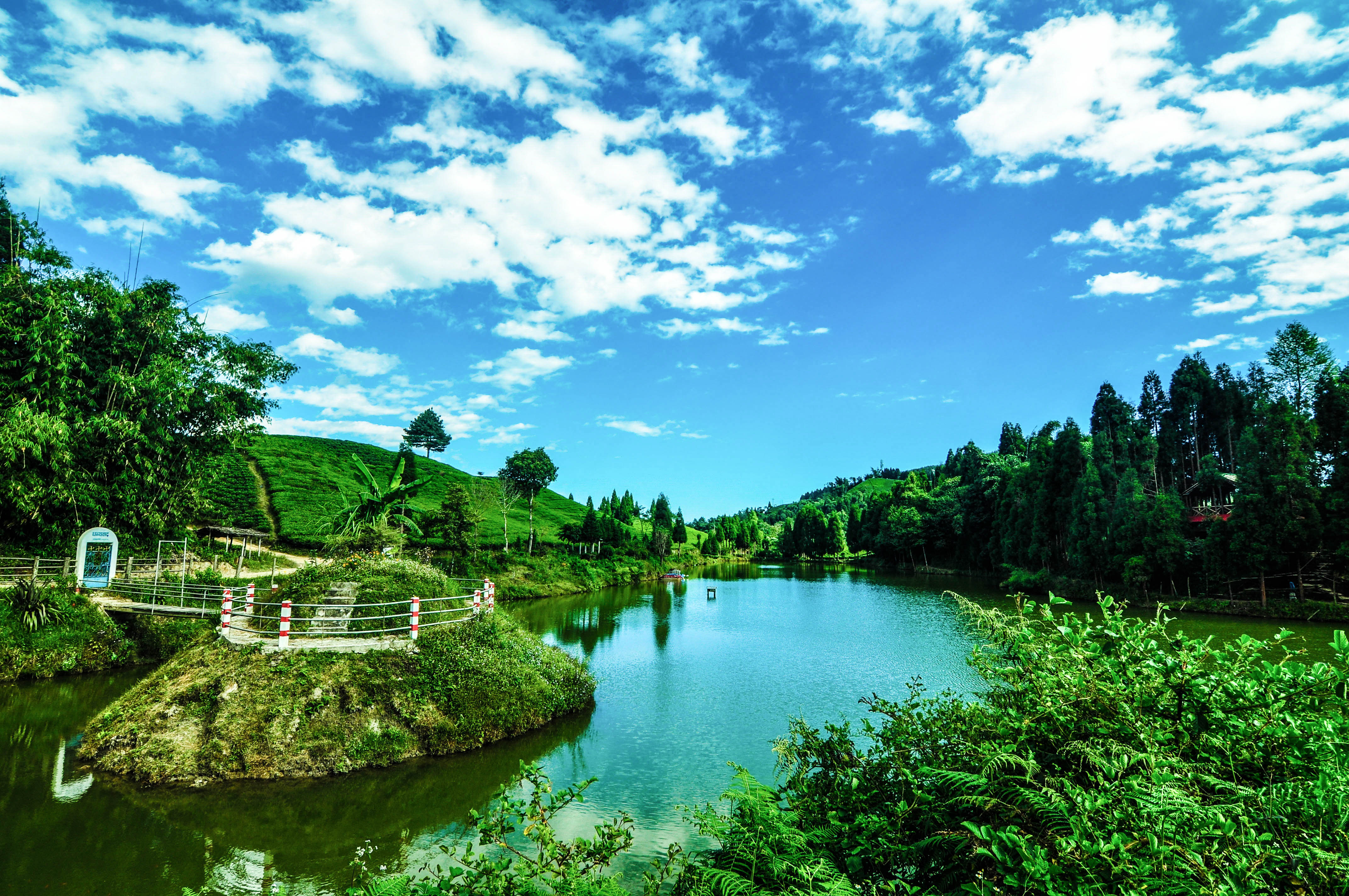
- Antu Pond at Shree Antu
- Nickname: Antu
- Location in Province Shree Antu (Nepal)
- Coordinates: 26°53′25.5″N 88°07′10.1″E
- Country: Nepal
- Province: Koshi Province
- District: Ilam District
- Municipality: Suryodaya Municipality
- Ward No.: 4

Government
  - Type: Ward Council
  - Ward Chairperson: Madhusudan Lamichhane

Area
  - Total: 24.08 km^{2} (9.30 sq mi)

Population (2021)
  - Total: 5,127
  - Density: 212.9/km^{2} (551.4/sq mi)
- Time zone: UTC+5:45 (Nepal Time)
- ZIP code: 57300

Shree Antu is a Village / Valley within Suryodaya Municipality in Ilam District in the Koshi Province of eastern Nepal. At the time of the 2021 Nepal census it had a population of 5,127.

Shree Antu is a popular tourist destination best known as the place to observe sunrise and is known for its tea gardens.

A view tower has been constructed atop the Shree Antu Hill at an altitude of 2328 m above sea level.

== Geography ==
Situated in the foothills of the Mahabharat Range, the area offers views of Mount Kanchenjunga, the third-highest mountain in the world, which is visible from the local sunrise view tower. The region features a subtropical highland climate, characterized by cool temperatures and frequent mist that supports local agricultural output. Shree Antu borders West Bengal, India and is a peaceful village known for its cool, breezy climate and scenic surroundings. It offers an ideal destination for trekking, hiking and enjoying breathtaking views of the surrounding landscapes.

Known for tea, cardamom, garlic etc, this place serves as very good producer of organic natural elements. Antu Pokhari, Bhanjyang, Chiruwa and lavishing tea gardens are some of its exotic places. As per the tourism Board, there is 567 hectare of tea garden in Shree Antu and 123 hectares of other commercial goods such as cardamom and garlic.

== Economy ==
The local economy is predominantly agrarian, relying on the cultivation of tea and large cardamom (known locally as alaichi). Ilam District is a major producer of large cardamom, contributing to Nepal's position as a leading global producer of the spice. Agricultural zones form the primary source of local income, with farming practices in the area increasingly focused on organic cultivation.

Shree Antu is also home to the Lepcha community, who have their unique traditions, culture and lifestyle.

== Demographics and culture ==
As an indigenous group of the eastern Himalayas, the Lepcha in Ilam maintain their cultural identity through traditional festivals and rituals. While many community members use Nepali as a primary language for trade and administration, the Lepcha language (a Sino-Tibetan language) remains in use within the community.

== Gallery ==
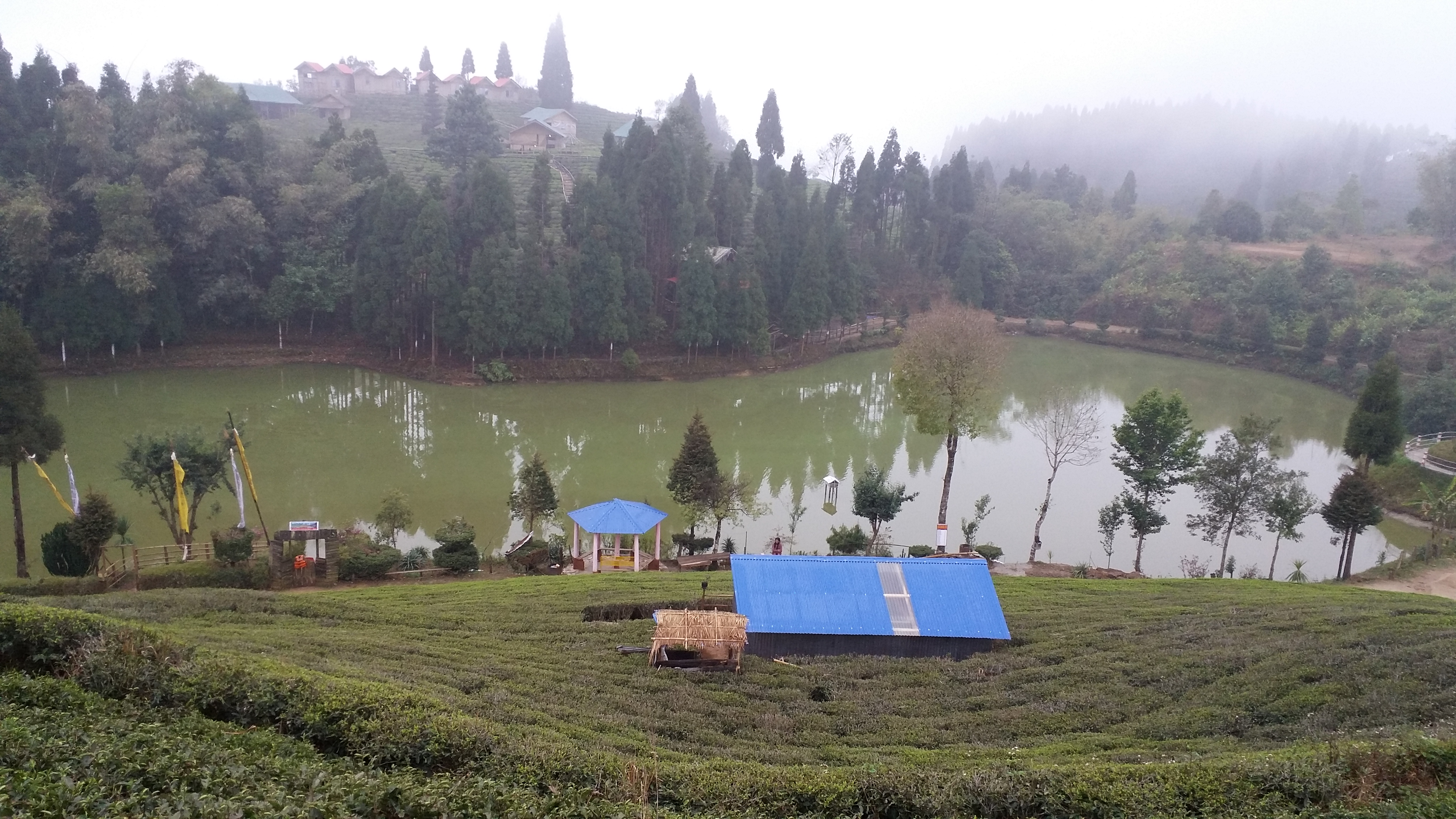
Shree Antu Pokhari at Shree Antu town in Ilam district Nepal

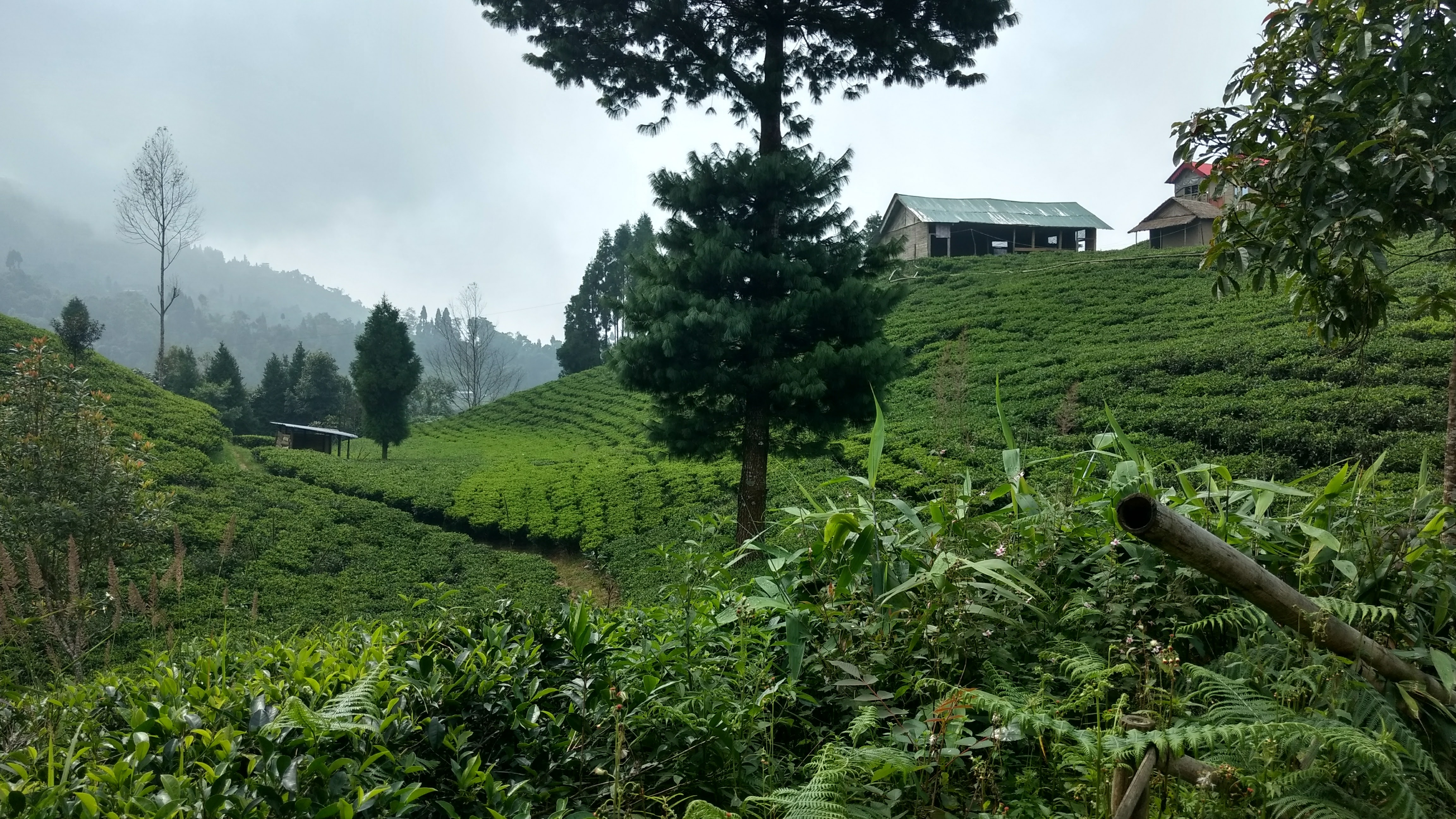
Tea Garden of Illam

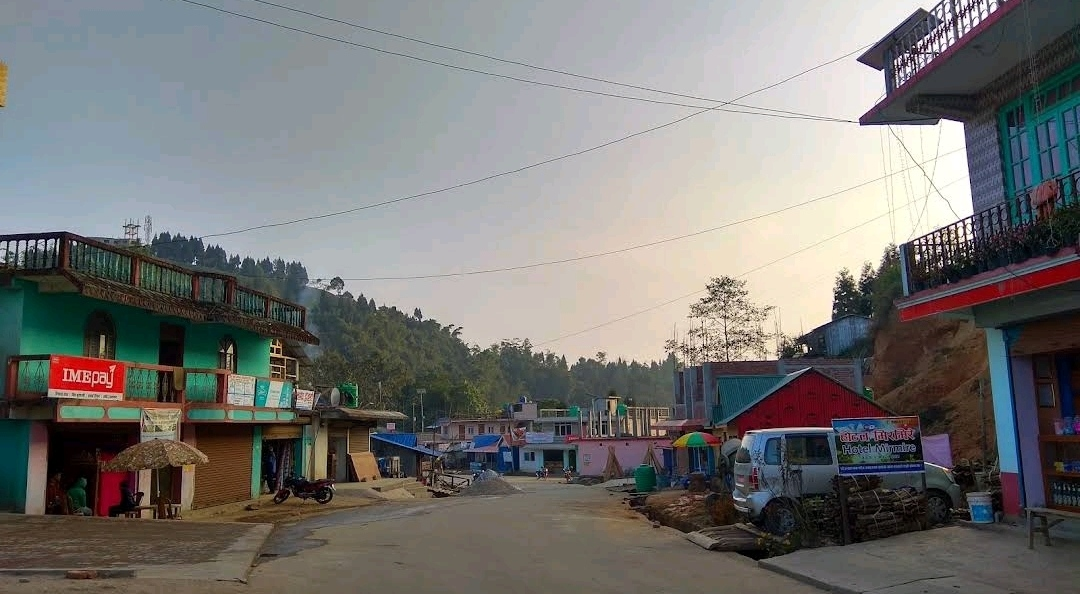
Bhanjyang of Shree Antu

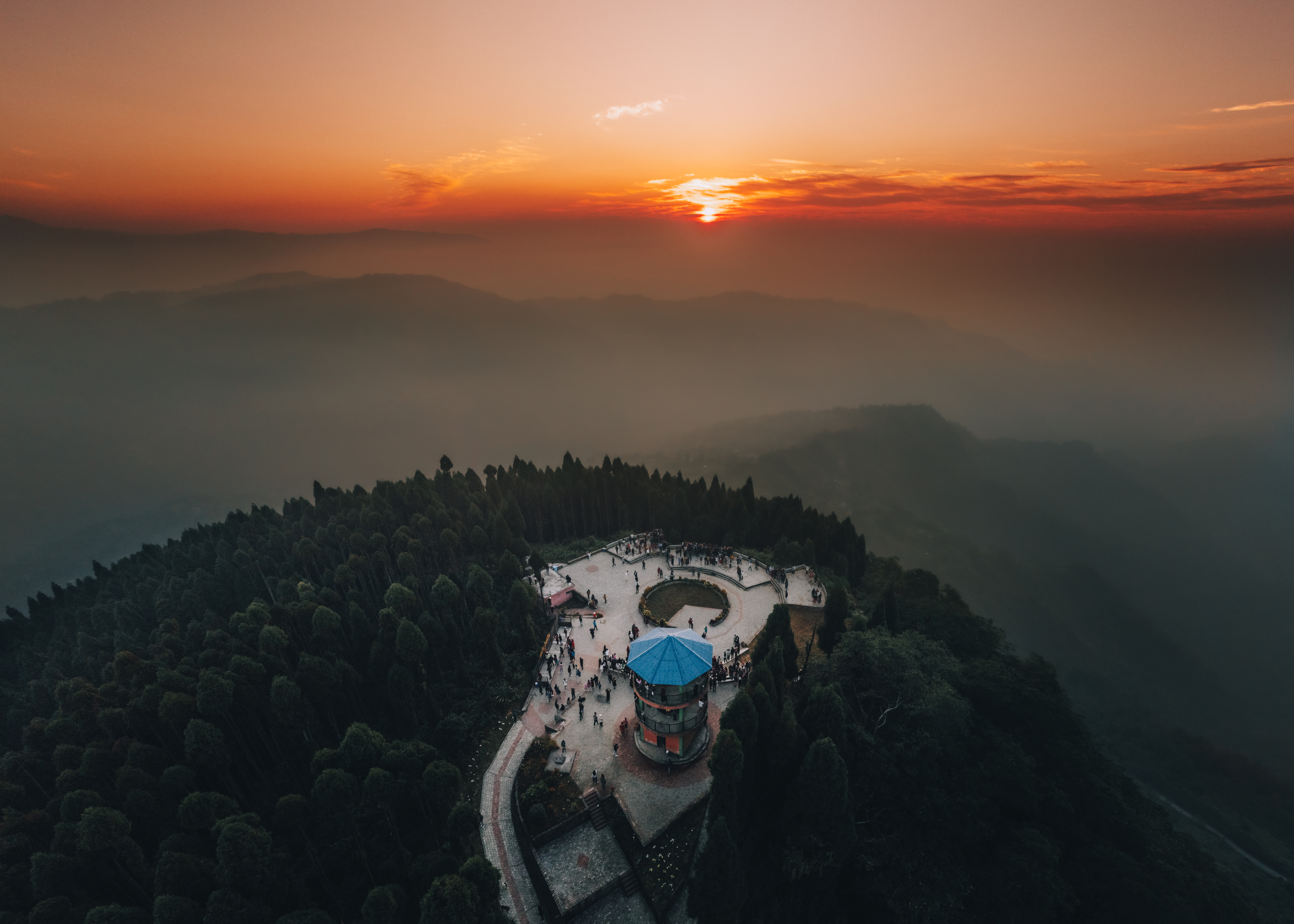
First rays of the sun
