= Suryodaya Municipality =

Municipality in Ilam, Koshi Province, Nepal

Suryodaya Municipality सूर्योदय नगरपालिका
- Municipality
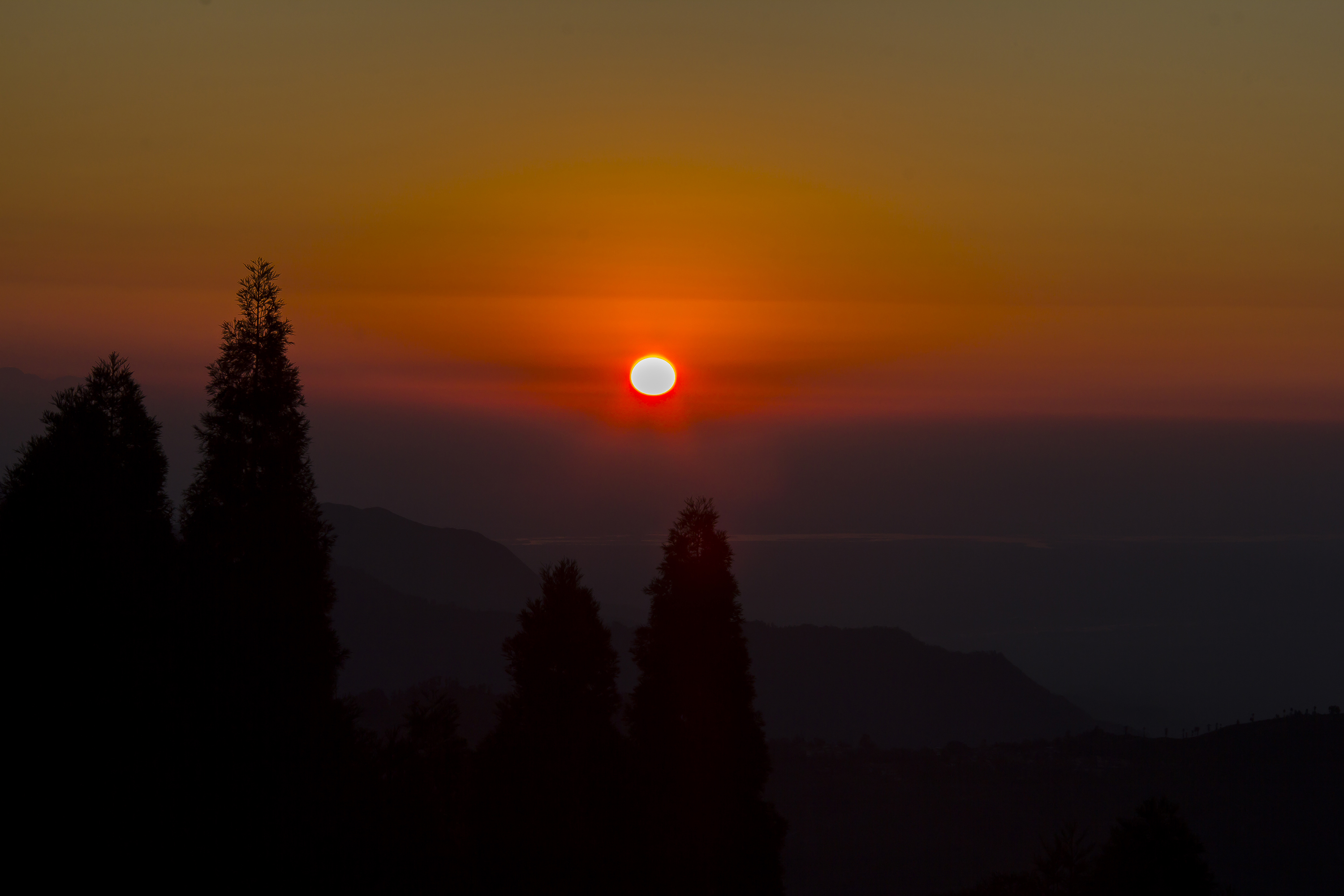
- Sunrise seen from Shree Antu, Ilam

- Location within Koshi Province Location within Nepal
- Coordinates: 26°53.45′N 88°3.90′E
- Country: Nepal
- Province: Koshi
- District: Ilam
- Established: 2014

Government
  - Type: Mayor–council
  - Mayor: Vacant
  - Vice Mayor: Durga Kumar Baral (Nepali Congress)
  - Chief Administrative Officer: Amrit Bahadur Rai

Area
  - Total: 252.52 km^{2} (97.50 sq mi)
  - Rank: 7th (Koshi Province)
- Elevation: 1,565 m (5,135 ft)

Population (2011)
  - Total: 56,691
  - Density: 224.50/km^{2} (581.45/sq mi)
- Time zone: UTC+5:45 (NPT)
- Area code: 027
- Website: www.suryodayamun.gov.np

Suryodaya Municipality is a municipality located in Koshi Pradesh of Nepal in Ilam district. Suryodaya is the Nepali translation for “Sunrise".

It was formed by merging three village development committees i.e. Phikal Bazar, Panchakanya and Kanyam in May 2014 and Pashupatinagar, Shree Antu, Samalbung, Gorkhe, Laxmipur (except ward number 5) and ward 8 and 9 of Jogmai in February 2017. It is the largest municipality in the district of Ilam in terms of area.

It covers the central part of the district of Ilam bordering Darjeeling in the east in east, Ilam municipality in the West, Rong Rural Municipality in the South, Mai Municipality in the South-West and Maijogmai rural municipality in the North. It offers three major transit points to India namely Pashupatinagar, Chhabisay and Manebhanjyang including other minor points like Okayti Godamdhura.

== Population ==
The 2011 population was 56,691.

Suryodaya Municipality hosts many tourist attractions like Shree Antu, Kanyam tea garden and Pashupatinagar.

=== Localities ===
- Gairigaun

== Geography ==
Latitude: 26°53'27"N

Longitude: 88°3'54"E

Climate: sub-tropical and sub-humid

Topography: Terrain

Elevation: 1,565 m (5,135 ft)

Area: 225.52 km^{2}

Population: 58114

Population Density: 251/km^2

== Kajini International Cricket Ground ==
Kajini Cricket Ground is managed by Suryodaya Municipality, in the eastern hills of Nepal. It appears in local government procurement documents dating back to April 2020, when a NRs. 41 lakh tender was issued for “land development” work—i.e. leveling, grass, basic touch‑ups to form a playable ground—but not building full spectator stands or pavilions.

== Gallery ==
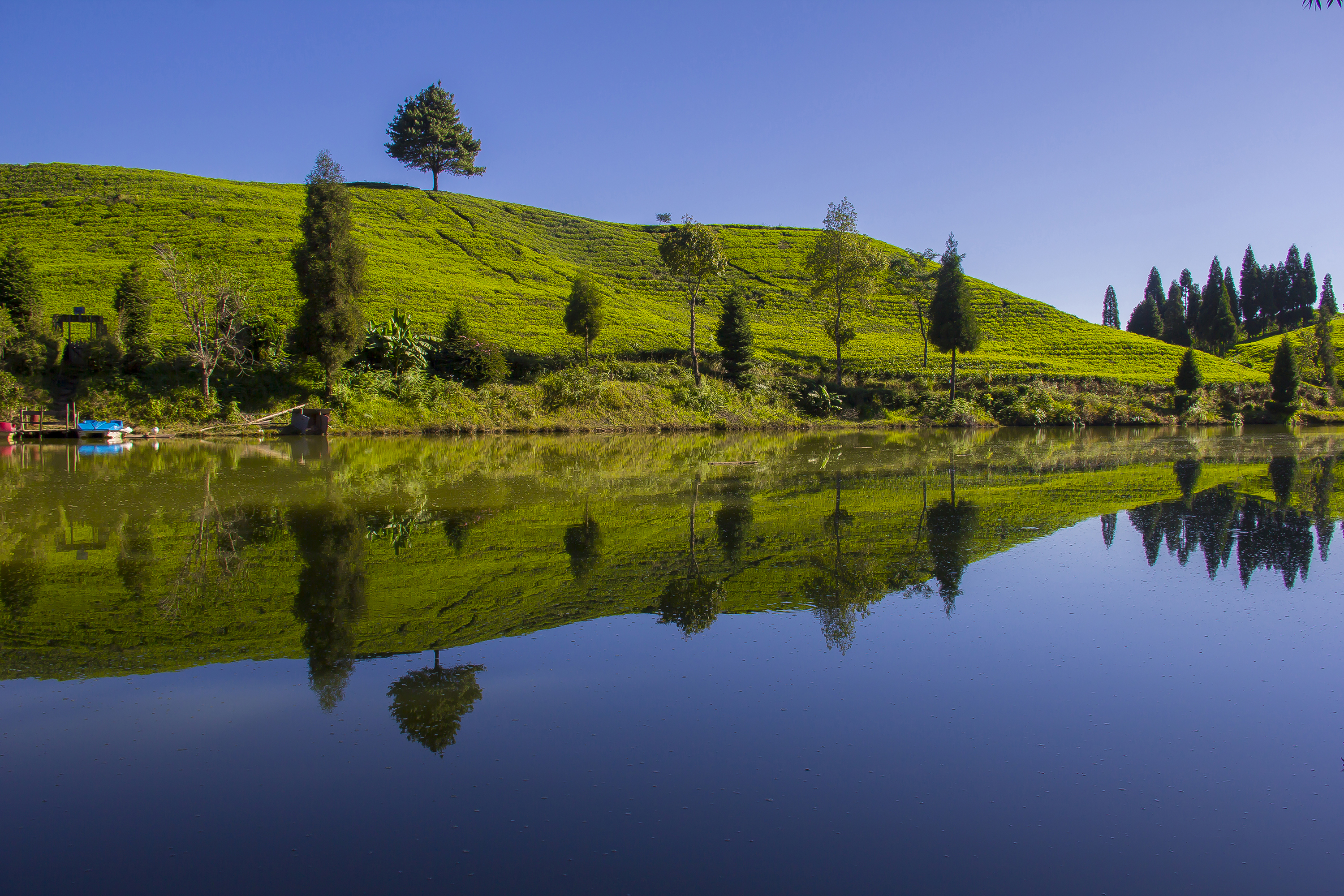
Reflection of the landscape of a tea garden in Antu Pokhari

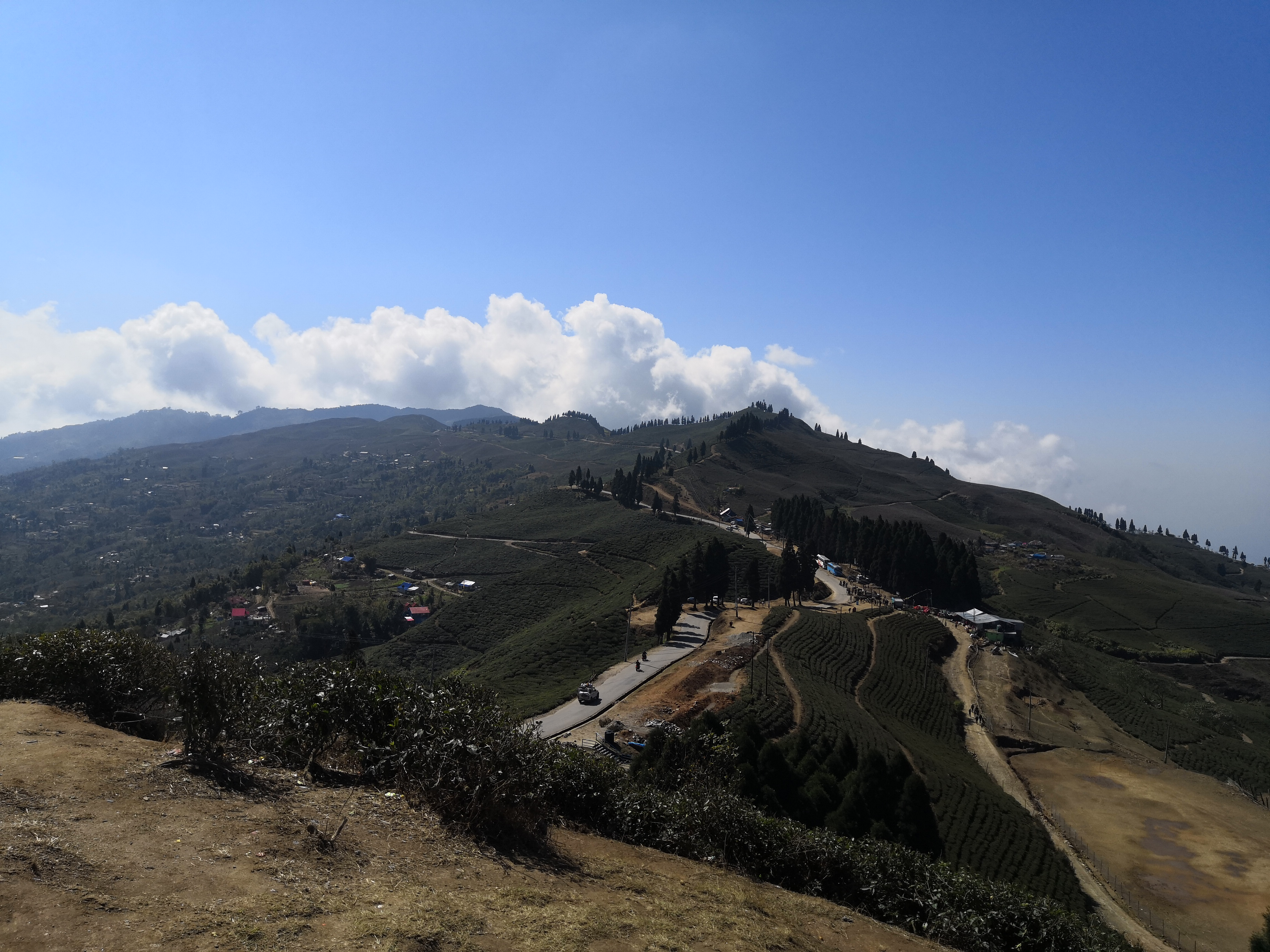
kanyam Tea Garden

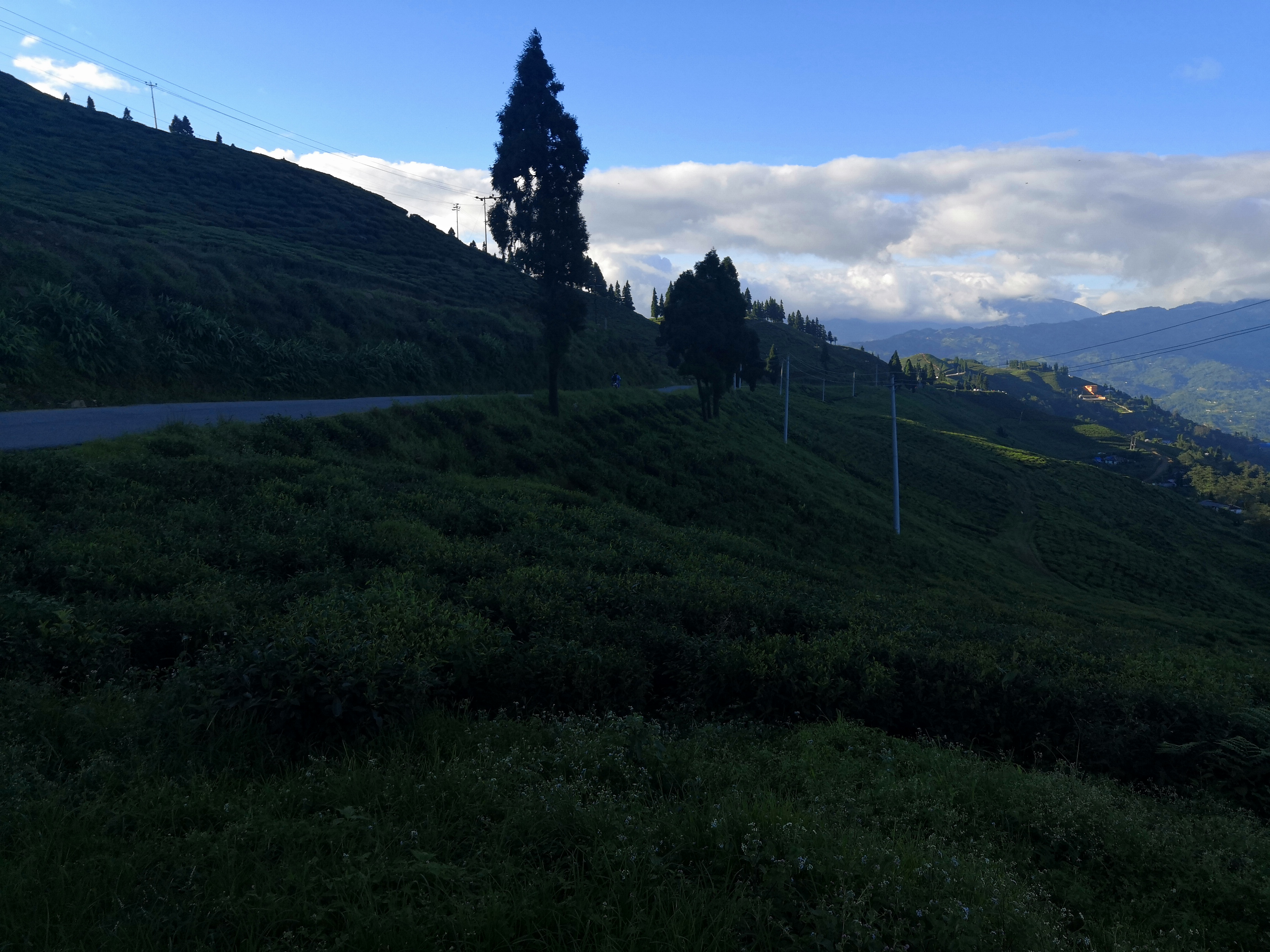
Kanyam

== See also ==
- Kajini International Cricket Ground
