= Pashupatinagar, Ilam =

Pashupatinagar पशुपतिनगर Paspati
- Neighborhood
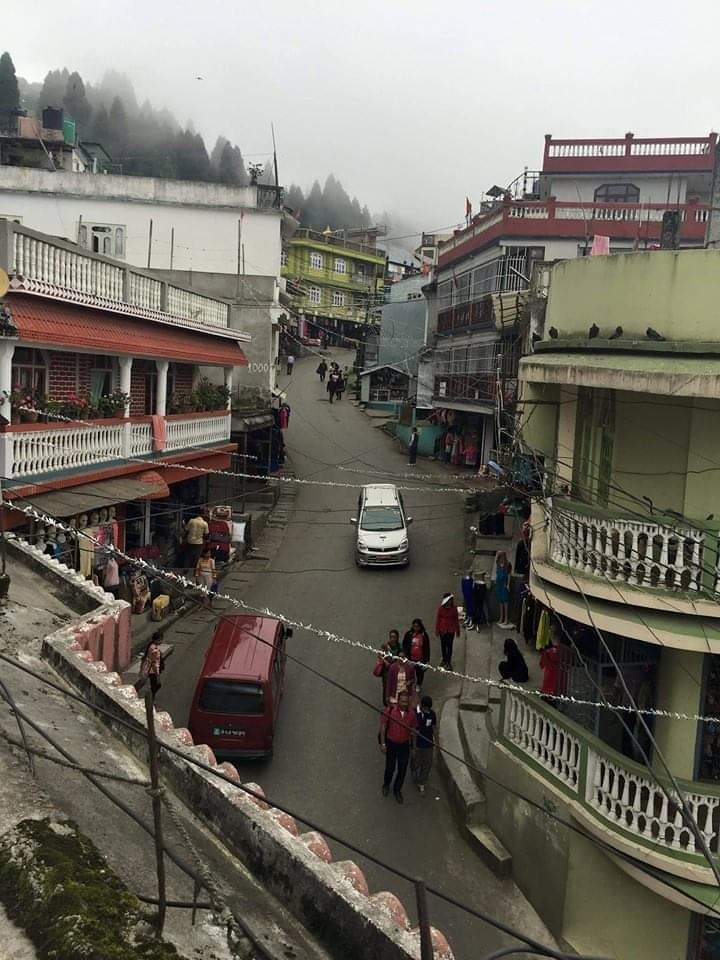
- A street in Pashupatinagar

- Location in Nepal Pashupatinagar (Nepal)
- Coordinates: 26°56′35″N 88°6′52″E
- Country: Nepal
- Province: Koshi
- District: Ilam
- Municipality: Suryodaya
- part of: ward no. 2 & 3
- Elevation: 2,000 m (6,600 ft)

Population (1991)
  - Total: 6,776
- Time zone: UTC+5:45 (Nepal Time)
- Postal code: 57303
- Area code: 027

Pashupatinagar is a neighborhood in Suryodaya Municipality of Ilam District of Koshi Province in Nepal. Previously it was a separate Village Development Committee in Ilam District in the Province No. 1 of Nepal. Pashupatinagar was Incorporated with Suryodaya municipality in 2017 and divided into two wards. The ward no. 2 and 3.

== Demographics ==
At the time of the 2011 Nepal census it had a population of 29,0082 persons living in 1980 individual households.

== Transport ==
Pashupatinagar is near Nepal's eastern border at Darjeeling District, West Bengal State, India. There is a border crossing to Sukhiapokhri town with a customs checkpoint. Indian and Nepalese nationals cross without restriction.
