= Duhagadhi =

Coordinates: 26.6500°N 88.0833°E

Duhagadhi दुहागढी
- Village development committee
- Interactive map of Duhagadhi
- Country: Nepal
- Province: Province No. 1
- District: Jhapa District

Population (1991)
  - Total: 6,499
- Time zone: UTC+5:45 (Nepal Time)

Duhagadhi is a place in Municipality in Jhapa District in Koshi Province of south-eastern Nepal. It was former VDC and later merged with Mechinagar. At the time of the 1991 Nepal census it had a population of 6499 people living in 1339 individual households.
