= Mai Pokhari =

Wetland in Ilam District, Nepal

- Nepali: माई पोखरी
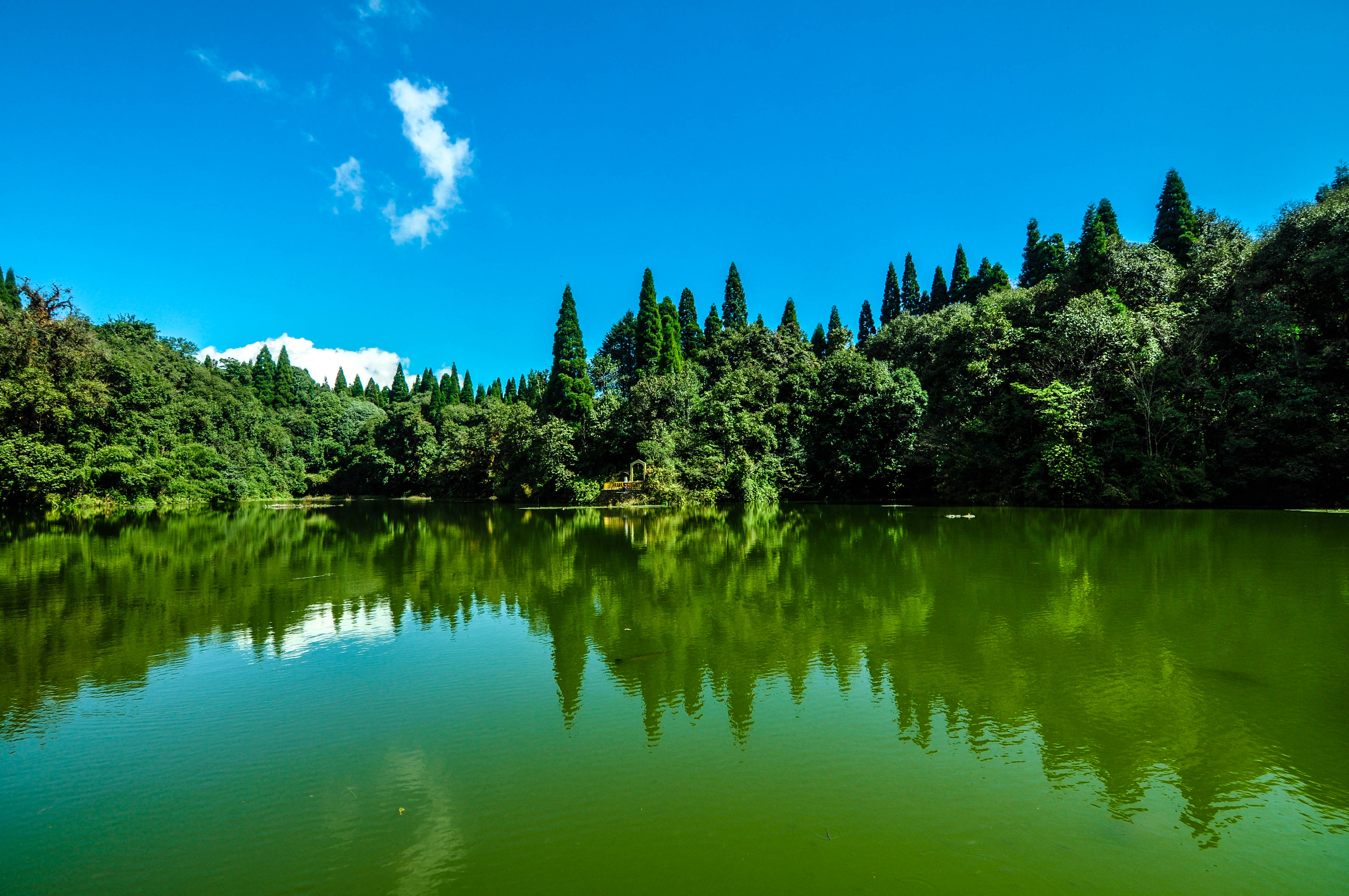
- Mai Pokhari wetland

- Location within Koshi Province Location within Nepal Location within South Asia
- Interactive map of Mai Pokhari
- Location: Ilam District, Nepal
- Coordinates: 27°0′25″N 87°55′48″E
- Area: 90 ha (220 acres)
- Established: October 2008

Ramsar Wetland
- Designated: 20 October 2008
- Reference no.: 1850

Mai Pokhari is a wetland in Ilam District of Nepal that was designated a Ramsar site on 28 October 2008. It is a pilgrimage center for both Hindus and Buddhists. The lake within the wetland which reflects emerald waters has a circumference of about 1 kilometre (0.62 mi) and boats are operated. On the periphery of the lake there is the Maipokhari Botanical Garden of horticultural and ecological importance which houses a rock garden, an orchid house, plants collected from many regions of eastern Nepal, and a green house.

== Geography ==
The wetland is in the middle hill ranges of the Himalayas at an elevation of about 2,100 m (6,900 ft) and covers an area of 90 ha (220 acres). It is about 15 km (9.3 mi) to the north of Ilam.

The wetland has been created due to ground subsidence. The source of water in the wetland is from natural springs and precipitation. It is the main source of fresh water for local people.

== Flora and fauna ==
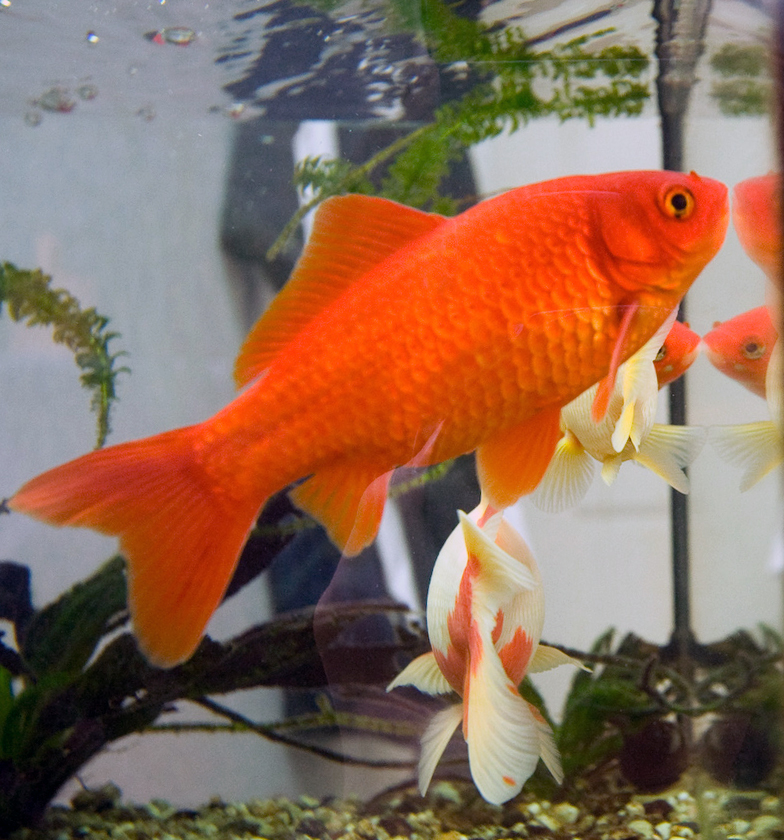
Goldfish

The wetland's flora consists of Schima, Castanopsis, laurel oak (Quercus laurifolia) and epiphytic orchids. Water lilly, cone trees, rhododendrons, and herbal plants also occur.

Faunal species include white-rumped vulture, leopard cat (Prionailurus bengalensis), Eurasian otter (Lutra Lutra), and endemic Variegated mountain lizard (Japalura variegata). There are also 300 species of birds recorded in the wetland.

The wetlands's lentic environment of bottom-fauna is in its natural status with a stratification of abundant Chironomids.

== Threats ==
The threats faced by the wetland relate to introduced invasive species, occupation of forest area, haphazard construction activity, proliferation of human settlement on the tracks leading to the wetland. Other threats identified are the use of pesticides in tea plantation in the watershed, and loss of habitat on account of growing crops such as cardamom, bouquet grass, and horticulture activities on the slopes of the wetland.

== Conservation ==
In order to promote conservation awareness among the stake holders and the local people, measures undertaken have included establishing a Code of Conduct, monitoring of water quality and key species, and instituting a Management Plan on the basis of ecological and socio-cultural studies. "Apart from the local community agencies involved with this work are the Ilam District Forest Office, the Ilam District Development Committee, the Department of Forests, the Department of National Parks and Wildlife Conservation, local eco-clubs of local students, local conservation centers and specialists". In 2014, the Ramsar Small Grants Fund supported a project that aimed at designing a management plan, improving coordination between the Community Forest User Groups around Mai Pokhari and increasing awareness of the importance of wetlands and their ecosystem services.

== See also ==
- List of lakes of Nepal
