= Panchakanya, Ilam =

Coordinates: 26°58′N 88°3′E

Panchakanya पञ्चकन्या
- Interactive map of Panchakanya
- Country: Nepal
- Province: Province No. 1
- District: Ilam District

Population (1991)
  - Total: 6,666
- Time zone: UTC+5:45 (Nepal Time)

Panchakanya is a town and Village Development Committee in Ilam District in the Province No. 1 of eastern Nepal. At the time of the 1991 Nepal census it had a population of 6,666 persons living in 1221 individual households.
