= Hanumannagar Kankalini Municipality =

Hanumannagar Kankalini हनुमाननगर कंकालिनी
- Municipality
- Location in Madhesh Province Hanumannagar Kankalini (Nepal)
- Coordinates: 26.5059°N 86.8597°E
- Country: Nepal
- Development Region: Central
- Province: Madhesh
- District: Saptari
- Established: 2073 BS

Government
  - Mayor: Birendra Majhi (Janamat Party)
  - Deputy mayor: Sarita Devi Yadav Sipaliya (JSPN)

Area
  - Total: 118.19 km^{2} (45.63 sq mi)

Population (2011)
  - Total: 51,126
  - Density: 432.57/km^{2} (1,120.4/sq mi)
  - Ethnicities: Yadav Mandals (dhanuk) Muslims Das(Baniya) Mehtas Mushars Maithil Brahamins
  - Religion: Hinduism Islam

Languages
  - Local: Maithili
  - Official: Nepali
- Time zone: UTC+5:45 (Nepal Time)
- Postal Code: 54600 =
- Area code: 031
- Website: hanumannagarkankalinimun.gov.np

Hanumannagar Kankalini is a municipality of Saptari District in Sagarmatha Zone of eastern Nepal. The municipality was established on 19 September 2015 by merging the existing Hanuman Nagar, Joginiya-1, Joginiya-2, Gobargada and Inarwa village development committees (VDCs). Later, Bhardaha, Portaha, Madhawapur, Rampur Malhniya, Malhniya village development committees (VDCs) were added to the existing Hanumannagar Yoginimai Municipality.

The center of the municipality is established in the mid of Hanumannagar Bazaar. After merging the 10 VDCs population it had a total population of 45,734 according to 2011 Nepal census. After the government decision the number of municipalities has reached 217 in Nepal. Thus formed municipality has 14 wards. Jitendra Majhi of Janamat Party was elected as the Mayor of the municipality after the 2022 Nepalese local elections.
