= Surunga Municipality =

Surunga सुरुङ्‍गा (Nepali)
- Municipality
- Municipality in Nepal
- Location in Madhesh Province Surunga (Nepal)
- Coordinates: 26.70°N 86.53°E
- Country: Nepal
- Development Region: Eastern
- Zone: Sagarmatha
- District: Saptari
- Province: Madhesh
- Municipality: Surunga

Government
  - Mayor: Gita Chaudhary (NC)
  - Deputy Mayor: Rudra Bahadur Karki (NC)

Area
  - Total: 107.04 km^{2} (41.33 sq mi)

Population (2017)
  - Total: 44,221
  - Density: 413.13/km^{2} (1,070.0/sq mi)
  - Religions: Hindu Muslim Christian

Languages
  - Local: Maithili, Tharu, Nepali
- Time zone: UTC+5:45 (NST)
- Postal Code: 56417
- Area code: 031
- Centre: Madhupatti, Saptari
- Website: www.surungamun.gov.np

Surunga Municipality (Nepali: सुरुङ्‍गा नगरपालिका) is located in Saptari District in the Province 2 of Nepal. It was formed in 2016 occupying current 11 sections (wards) merging previous Pipra, Hardiya, Daulatpur, Madhupati, Kushaha, Haripur, Malhanwa, Tikulya, Pramanpur (ward no.09) and Patewarba VDCs. It occupies an area of 107.04 km^{2} with a total population of 44,221.
