= Khadak, Nepal =

Khadak खडक (Nepali)
- Municipality
- Municipality in Nepal
- Location in Nepal
- Coordinates: 26.65°N 86.63°E
- Country: Nepal
- Development Region: Eastern
- Zone: Sagarmatha
- District: Saptari
- Province: Province No. 2
- Municipality: Khadak

Government
  - Mayor: Jay Prakash Chaudhary
  - Deputy Mayor: Rita Kumari Chaudhary

Area
  - Total: 96.77 km^{2} (37.36 sq mi)

Population (2017)
  - Total: 45,367
  - Density: 468.8/km^{2} (1,214/sq mi)
  - Religions: Hindu Muslim Buddhism

Languages
  - Local: Tharu, Nepali, Tamang
- Time zone: UTC+5:45 (NST)
- Postal Code: 56414
- Area code: 031
- Website: www.khadakmun.gov.np

Khadak Municipality (Nepali: खडक नगरपालिका) is located in Saptari District in the Province 2 of Nepal. It was formed in 2016 occupying current 11 sections (wards) merging previous Siswa Belhi, Banarjhula, Pansera, Khojpur, Kalyanpur, Fulbariya, Mainasarsabahu and Banauli VDCs, residing its head office at Kalyanpur Bazaar. It occupies an area of 96.77 km^{2} with a total population of 45,367.

== Transportation ==
Khadak Municipality is located as a station at Mahendra Highway, thus it is directly linked with it.

== Festivals & Celebrations ==
Maghi is most celebrated as Tharu are densely populated in this area. Dashain, Tihar and chhatt is also celebrated widely.

== Religious Places ==
Khadak river, Chappin river, Lakasair river, Dihbaar Baba Ranjitpur

== Health ==
Kalyanpur PHCC

== Education ==
Public/Government Schools
Ward No. 1 :

- Secondary School, Siswaa Belhi, Saptari
- Gu. Ja. Jaa. Raastriya Primary School, Siswaa Belhi, Saptari

Ward No. 2 :

- Raastriya Basic School, Duhabi, Saptari
- Janata Raastriya Primary School, Siswaa Belhi, Saptari

Ward No. 3 :

- Secondary School, Banarjhula, Saptari
- Janahit Primary School, Banarjhula, Saptari
- Mohmadiya Daarul Hardis, Banarjhula, Saptari
- Madarsha Taalemul Kuraan, Banarjhula, Saptari
- Raastriya Basic School, Kanchira, Saptari
- Raastriya Primary School, Kanchira, Saptari
- Raastriya Primary School, Gururaha, Saptari

Ward No. 4 :

- Secondary School, Pansera, Saptari
- Baageshwari Basic School, Amaha, Saptari
- Madarsha Faizul Ulaf, Amaha, Pansera, Saptari
- Bauku Janta Raastriya Primary School, Karmaniya, Saptari

Ward No. 5 :

- Basic School, Khojpur, Saptari
- Janata Secondary School, Khojpur, Ranjitpur, Saptari
- Raastriya Primary School, Meghawaari, Saptari
- Janta Raastriya Primary School, Kharchuhiyaa, Saptari

Ward No. 6 :

- Secondary School, Kalyanpur, Saptari

Ward No. 7 :

- Janata Raastriya Primary School, Kalyanpur, Saptari
- Raastriya Primary School, Majhau, Saptari
- Shahamaaniya Birpur, Kalyanpur, Saptari

Ward No. 8 :

- Janata Raastriya Primary School, Musaharniya, Bishnupur, Saptari
- Janata Raastriya Primary School, Bhadiya, Saptari
- Resham Raastriya Primary School, Khaisarahaa, Saptari
- Munar Janta Raastriya Primary School, Dholabajaa, Saptari

Ward No. 9 :

- Secondary School, Laalpatti, Saptari
- Ja. Mu. Basic Secondary School, Bajaraahi, Gutthi, Saptari
- Raastriya Primary School, Mainaatole, Saptari
- Raastriya Primary School, Sarpa, Saptari
- Janata Raastriya Primary School, Dangraahi, Saptari

Ward No. 10 :

- Secondary School, Inarwaa, Fulbadiya, Saptari
- Secondary School, Bhairganj, Belha, Saptari
- Raastriya Primary School, Inarwaa Fulbadiyaa, Saptari
- Islam Miya Primary School, Daawatanagar, Inarwaa Fulbadiyaa, Saptari

Ward No. 11 :

- Raastriya Primary School, Banauli, Saptari
- Raastriya Primary School, Amarjyoti Tole, Banauli, Saptari
- Imdaadiya Raastriya Primary School, Nannakaar, Banauli, Saptari
- Raastriya Primary School, Laalpur, Saptari
