= Rayapur =

Rayapur may refer to:

- Rayapur, Lumbini
- Rayapur, Sagarmatha
