= Belhi Chapma =

Coordinates: 26°31′N 86°41′E

Belhi Chapena बेल्ही चपेना
- Village development committee
- Interactive map of Belhi Chapena
- Country: Nepal
- Zone: Sagarmatha Zone
- District: Saptari District

Population (2011)
  - Total: 5,807
- Time zone: UTC+5:45 (Nepal Time)

Belhi Chapena is a village development committee in Saptari District in the Sagarmatha Zone of south-eastern Nepal. At the time of the 2011 Nepal census it had a population of 5,807 people living in 1105 individual households.
