= Maina Sahasrabahu =

Village development committee in Sagarmatha Zone, Nepal

Maina Sahasrabahu मैना सहश्रबाहु
- Village in Nepal
- Location in Nepal
- Coordinates: 26.62°N 86.62°E
- Country: Nepal
- Zone: Sagarmatha Zone
- District: Saptari District

Population (2011)
  - Total: 4,047
- Time zone: UTC+5:45 (Nepal Time)

Maina Sahasrabahu is a village in Khadak Municipality in Saptari District in the Sagarmatha Zone of South-Eastern Nepal. It is the former Village Development Committee of Nepal. At the time of the 2011 Nepal census, it had a population of 4,047 people living in 779 individual households.
