= Baniniya, Saptari =

Banainiya बनैनियाँ
- Village development committee
- Location in Nepal
- Country: Nepal
- Zone: Sagarmatha Zone
- District: Saptari District

Population (2011)
  - Total: 3,646
- Time zone: UTC+5:45 (Nepal Time)
- Postal code: 56413
- Area code: +977-031
- Website: Official website

Bainiya is a village development committee in Saptari District in the Sagarmatha Zone of south-eastern Nepal. At the time of the 2011 Nepal census it had a population of 2991 people living in 693 individual households.

Baniniya got merged to form Rajgadh Rural Municipality's ward number 2.
