= Purba =

Purba (lit. 'east' in Indic languages) may refer to:

- Deep Roy (born 1957), a Kenyan-born Indian actor, born Mohinder Purba
- Kīla (Buddhism), a ceremonial knife or dagger, also known as a "Phurba"
- Pipra (Purba), a village in Nepal
- Purba, one of the Batak surnames in Indonesia

== See also ==
- Purvas, Jain scriptures
- Purva Bedi, an Indian-American actress
- Purva Rana, an Indian model and actress
- Purva Pradesh, a proposed Indian state
