= Padampur, Nepal =

Padampur पदमपुर
- Municipality
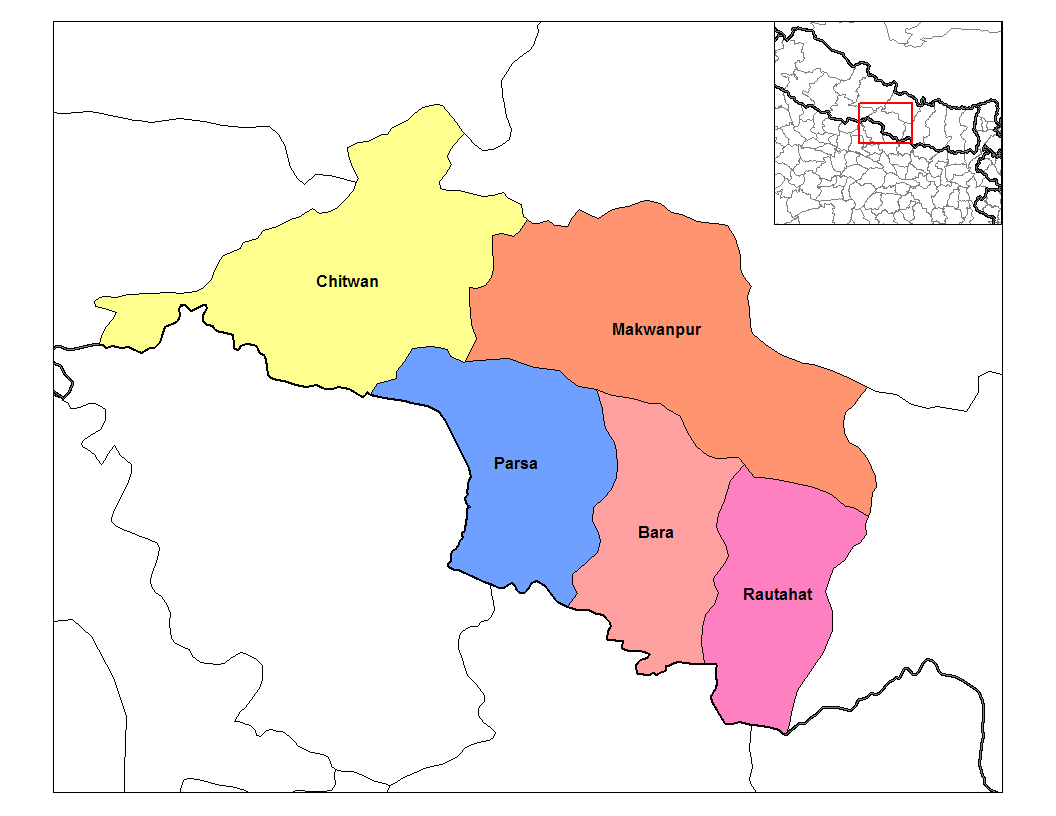
- Country: Nepal
- Province: Bagmati

Government
  - Type: Coordination committee
  - Body: DCC, Padampur

Area
  - Total: 63.3 km^{2} (24.4 sq mi)

Population (2011)
  - Total: 14,924
  - Density: 236/km^{2} (611/sq mi)
- Time zone: UTC+05:45 (NPT)
- Telephone Code: 056

Padampur is a small village located in Kalika Municipality of Bagmati Province of Nepal. At the time of the 1991 Nepal census it had a population of 8,884 people living in 1,559 individual households. It was transferred in new location named Saguntol by Government of Nepal and completed within 8 years. Previously, it was located near the Rapati River. Now this village has merged in Kalika Municipality and shares 4 wards in it i.e. Kalika -9, Kalika-10, Kalika-11 and Kalika-12.

== Wards (tols) ==
Name of Municipality	Code
Kamalpur	Padampur-1
Jirpur	Padampur-2
Pipariya	Padampur-3
Khekhadiya	Padampur-4
Bhimpur	Padampur-5
Dhedauli	Padampur-6
Marchauli	Padampur-7
Bankatta	Padampur-8
Gadauli	Padampur-9

== Places of interest ==
Being newly created VDC of Nepal, its new location was agreed upon significantly more widely than the previous location. After the move, researchers developed a planned model of geography. Bhimbali temple, water tank, community forest, dairy office and high school are common tourist destinations.

== Schools of Padampur ==
- Bhimodaya Higher Secondary School
- Nimabi Dhedauli
- Nimabi Gadauli
- Nimabi Kamalpur
- Nimabi Bankatta
- Ra Pra Bi Sahapur
- Ra Pra Bi Pipariya
- Rashtiya Samudayik Pra Bi
- Padampur Siksha Niketan
- Janahit Ra. Pra. Vi Simalbasti 8
- Chitrawan Secondary Boarding School

== Shaheed Smriti Multiple Campus ==
Shaheed Smriti multiple campus is located in Padampur -4. It is the extension branch of Saheed Smriti Multiple Campus, Ratnanagar, Tandi. Hari prasad Kadel was the co-coordinator of this campus in incorporating time. Posta Raj Aryal was the most recent coordinator.

== Cooperative Organizations ==
For marginal and almost people need saving for the endowment of their different family works. For it, cooperative organization are primarily important. Some successfully operating cooperative organizations are as follows.

- Prajwal Mahila Bachat Tatha Rin Sahakari Sanstha Ltd.
- Padampur Bachaht Tatha Rin Sahakari Sanstha Ltd.
- Shree Bhimkali Bachat Tatha Rin Sahakari Sanstha Ltd.
- Yati Bahuuddessiya Bachat Tatha Rin Sahakari Sanstha Ltd.
- Nari Kalyan Bachat Tatha Rin Sahakari Sanstha Ltd.
- Padampur Dugdha Utpadak Sahakari Sanstha Ltd.
- Sahamati Upabhokta Sahakari Sanstha Ltd.

== Bhimodaya Model School ==
It is the only one higher secondary school of Padampur. Approximately 1200 students are currently studying there from nursery-level to Grade 12. There are 36 staff members. Dr. Hari Prasad Kandel is the principal and Ram pd.dhakal is the vice principal of the school. The school building consists of two 3-storied buildings and one 2-storied building with program hall. It is located in the middle of the Padampur. Approximately 1,200 students are studying here. It has started English medium classes, which are popular. Clean, Green and Peace is the motto of this school this time with quality education. It has aimed to stand the pioneer school in the district.

== Political Leaders ==
For the development of local area, local leaders typically contribute. Some of the following leaders have played key roles to shift the village from the previous location in Rapatipari. Some of the leaders of the village are as follows:

- Nanada Pd. Bhattrai
- Dimbar Ram Chaudhary
- Hatthuram Chaudhary
- Jitbahadur Chaudhary
- Jayachandra Chaudhary
- Ramchandra Poudel
- Jiwan Chaudhary

== Padampur drinking water and sanitation consumers society ==
It is the main drinking water supply office of Padampur and was founded in 2061. It is located at Padampur-8. It is based on water resource rule of Nepal and affiliated to Khane pani division office Chitwan. It is Deep Tubewell water system and covered the whole Padampur VDC having piping more than 100 km, it is one of modern and expensive project accomplished by government sector. The overhead water tank is 32 meters high and can carry 4,50,000 liters at once. It has more than 15,000 consumers. The drinking water is no more main issue in this place.

Except main underground drinking water supply system there are three other independent drinking water supply communities in ward no 1 (started since BS 2056), 2 and 8 (started since BS 2059). The water sources of these communities are located in the Mahabharat hill. The spa of the communities 2 and 8 is same where as community (Churiya ) of ward no. 1 gets from spa near Gairibaari, a village of Shaktikhor VDC. These three communities have their own overhead water tanks capable of storing 60,000 L of water.

Moreover, there are several manually dug water wells for drinking water, especially in ward no 6, 5, 4, and 9 more successfully by private sector.

== Society of Padampur ==
There are varieties of people living in Padampur. Tharu people were the main land owners in the past but now they are in minority in population. Tamang, Gurung, Brahmin, Newar, Darai, Chepang and other castes of people live here.
