= List of educational institutions in Kanchan Rup =

This list provides the list of various educational institutions in municipality of Saptari District, Nepal i.e. Kanchan Rup.

Kanchan Rup is home to several educational institutions for pre-primary, primary, lower secondary, secondary, higher secondary and college studies.

== Colleges ==
1. Annapurna Multiple Campus, Kanchanpur-Barrier
2. Sungava Multiple Campus, Kanchanpur-saptari
3. National People College, Kanchanpur
4. Rupnagar Multiple Campus=

== Higher Secondary School ==
1. Balabodh Higher Secondary English Boarding School, Kanchanpur-Barrier
2. Shree Mahendra Janta Higher Secondary School, Baluwa, Kathmandu|Baluwa
3. Shree Sarvodaya Higher Secondary School, Kanchanpur
4. Shree Shankar Higher Secondary School, Rupnagar

== Secondary school ==
1. Children Model School, Kanchanpur Barrier
2. Daffodil Secondary English School, Kanchanpur
3. Little Flower English Boarding School, Rupnagar
4. International Lucky English School, Kanchanpur
5. Motherland English Boarding School, Kanchanpur Hatiya
6. Peace Angel's English School, Kanchanpur
7. Rajaji Janjagaran English Boarding School, Maleth
8. RD Memorial English Boarding School, Rupnagar
9. Shree Bhrikuti Secondary School, Aadarsha Tol, Bandara
10. Shree Shankar Secondary School, Subba Tol, Barmajhiya

== Lower Secondary School ==
1. Balabodh English Boarding School
2. Lotus English Academy, Barmajhiya
3. Sunakhari English Academy Boarding School
4. Sagarmatha Public School, Baramjhiya
5. Shree Shiva English Boarding School, Baramjhiya

== Primary school ==
1. Geeta Gyan Kunj English School, Baramjhiya
2. Rose Hill English Boarding School, Baluwa
3. Sharda International Boarding School, Kanchanpur
4. Shree Bhagwati Rastriya Primary School, Ladhbedahi
5. Shree Rastriya Primary School, Ghoghanpur, Sitapur
6. Damber Devi Bhagawati Primary School, Bengri

== Pre-primary Schools ==
1. Suryodaya English Montessary Boarding School, Baluwa
