= Goithi =

Former Village Development Committee in Nepal

Goithi गोइठी
- Village development committee
- Location in Nepal
- Coordinates: 26.58°N 86.85°E
- Country: Nepal
- Zone: Sagarmatha Zone
- District: Saptari District

Population (2011)
  - Total: 3,751
- Time zone: UTC+5:45 (Nepal Time)

Goithi is a village development committee in Saptari District in the Sagarmatha Zone of south-eastern Nepal. At the time of the 2011 Nepal census, it had a population of 3,751 people living in 724 individual households.
