= Pharseth =

Pharsaith फर्सैठ Jhalhi Farsaith
- Village development committee
- Location in Nepal
- Coordinates: 26.53°N 86.77°E
- Country: Nepal
- Zone: Sagarmatha Zone
- District: Saptari District

Population (1991)
  - Total: 2,808
- Time zone: UTC+5:45 (Nepal Time)

Pharsaith is a village development committee in Saptari District in the Sagarmatha Zone of south-eastern Nepal. The village is situated only a half kilometre away from Rajbiraj Municipality. At the time of the 1991 Nepal census it had a population of 2808 people living in 460 individual households.
