= Kochabakhari =

Former Village Development Committee in Nepal

Kochabakhari कोचाबखारी
- Village development committee
- Interactive map of Kochabakhari
- Coordinates: 26.47°N 86.72°E
- Country: Nepal
- Zone: Sagarmatha Zone
- District: Saptari District

Population (2011)
  - Total: 6,241
- Time zone: UTC+5:45 (Nepal Time)

Kochabakhari is a village development committee in Saptari District in the Sagarmatha Zone of south-eastern Nepal. At the time of the 2011 Nepal census it had a population of 6,241 people living in 1,334 individual households.

This VDC has 3 villages namely Lokharam, Kochabakhari & kupahi. Lokharam is the largest village among them. Lokharam is situated near Bhaluwahi river. Indian border lies only 3 km away from this village. Main occupation of the people of this village is farming. Few people are also serving in Government offices of Nepal.
