= Paterwa, Saptari =

Coordinates: 26°38′N 86°33′E

Paterwa पटेर्वा
- Village development committee
- Interactive map of Paterwa
- Country: Nepal
- Zone: Sagarmatha Zone
- District: Saptari District

Population (1991)
  - Total: 3,069
- Time zone: UTC+5:45 (Nepal Time)

Paterwa is a village development committee in Saptari District in the Sagarmatha Zone of south-eastern Nepal. At the time of the 1991 Nepal census it had a population of 3069 living in 570 households.
