= Birpur Barahi =

Birpur बरही बीरपुर Barhi
- Village development committee
- Interactive map of Birpur
- Country: Nepal
- Province: Province No. 2
- District: Saptari District

Population (2011)
  - Total: 6,504
- Time zone: UTC+5:45 (Nepal Time)

Barhi Birpur 「^{2}」(बरही बीरपुर) is a village development committee in Saptari District in Province No. 2 of south-eastern Nepal. At the time of the 2011 Nepal census it had a population of 6,504 people living in 1,193 individual households. Ray, Yadav and Ram are majority cast of Barhi Birpur. Barhi birpur is Now Chhinnamasta VDC.Birpur Barhi is Agriculture land for Rice and paddy Production.「³」
