= Barhmapur =

Village development committee in Sagarmatha Zone, Nepal

Brahmapur ब्रह्मापुर
- Village development committee
- Country: Nepal
- Zone: Sagarmatha Zone
- District: Saptari District

Population (2011)
  - Total: 4,673
- Time zone: UTC+5:45 (Nepal Time)

Brahmapur is a village development committee in Saptari District in the Sagarmatha Zone of southeastern Nepal. At the time of the 2011 Nepal census it had a population of 4673 people living in 886 individual households.
