= Ko. Madhepura =

Former Village Development Committee in Nepal

Coordinates: 26°31′N 86°49′E

Ko. Madhepura कोशी मध्येपुरा
- Village development committee
- Interactive map of Ko. Madhepura
- Country: Nepal
- Zone: Sagarmatha Zone
- District: Saptari District

Population (2011)
  - Total: 4,608
- Time zone: UTC+5:45 (Nepal Time)

Ko. Madhepura is a village development committee in Saptari District in the Sagarmatha Zone of south-eastern Nepal. At the time of the 2011 Nepal census it had a population of 4,608.
