= Dharampur, Saptari =

Former Village Development Committee in Nepal

Coordinates: 26.6508°N 86.9012°E

Dharampur धरमपुर
- Interactive map of Dharampur
- Country: Nepal
- Zone: Sagarmatha Zone
- District: Saptari District

Population (1991)
  - Total: 3,668
- Time zone: UTC+5:45 (Nepal Time)

Dharampur is a village and market center in Kanchan Rup Municipality in Saptari District in the Sagarmatha Zone of south-eastern Nepal. It was merged in the municipality along with other 8 Villages since 18 May 2013. At the time of the 1991 Nepal census, it had a population of 3668 people residing in 673 individual households.
