= Jandaul =

Former Village Development Committee in Nepal

Ghongidaha - Bhwanipur घोंघीदाहा – भवानीपुर
- Village development committee
- Location in Nepal
- Coordinates: 26.66°N 86.78°E
- Country: Nepal
- Zone: Sagarmatha Zone
- District: Saptari District

Population (2011)
  - Total: 4,360
- Time zone: UTC+5:45 (Nepal Time)

Jandaul is a village development committee in Saptari District in the Sagarmatha Zone of southeastern Nepal. At the time of the 2011 Nepal census, it had a population of 4,360 people living in 870 individual households.
