= Trikola =

Coordinates: 26.57°N 86.86°E

Trikola त्रिकोल
- Village development committee
- Interactive map of Trikola
- Country: Nepal
- Zone: Sagarmatha Zone
- District: Saptari District

Population (1991)
  - Total: 4,065
- Time zone: UTC+5:45 (Nepal Time)

Trikola is a village development committee in Saptari District in the Sagarmatha Zone of south-eastern Nepal. At the time of the 1991 Nepal census it had a population of 4065.
