= Didhawa =

Former Village Development Committee in Nepal

Dighawa दिघवा
- Rajbiraj Municipality
- Dighawa
- Interactive map of Dighawa
- Coordinates: 26.57°N 86.77°E
- Country: Nepal
- [Province of Nepal]: Province 02 Madhesh
- District: Saptari District

Government
  - Type: Rajbiraj Municipality
  - Mayor: Bhim Raj Yadav
  - Ward President: Ganga Khang Khatwe

Population (2011)
  - Total: 4,249
- Time zone: UTC+5:45 (Nepal Time)
- Postal code: 56400

Dighawa was a village development committee in Saptari District in the Sagarmatha Zone of south-eastern Nepal. It is now a part of Rajbiraj Municipality Ward No. 10.

At the time of the 2011 Nepal census it had a population of 4,249.

Demographics: People from different castes from Maithali communities (Madheshi) reside here. Castes like Yadav, Khatwe, Chamar, Musahar, Bania, Barai, Hajam, Haluwai, Teli, Natt Muslims are found in significant numbers. Maithali is spoken by all.
