= Rupnagar, Nepal =

Rupnagar रूपनगर Pragati tole
- Nickname: pragati tole
- Location in Nepal
- Coordinates: 26.66°N 86.89°E
- Country: Nepal
- Zone: Sagarmatha Zone
- District: Saptari District

Population (1991)
  - Total: 4,337
- Time zone: UTC+5:45 (Nepal Time)

Rupnagar is a village and market center in Kanchan Roop Municipality in Saptari District in the Sagarmatha Zone of south-eastern Nepal. It was merged in the municipality along with other 8 Villages since 18 May 2013. At the time of the 1991 Nepal census it had a population of 4337 people living in 796 individual households.
