= Maina Kaderi =

Village development committee in Sagarmatha Zone, Nepal

Coordinates: 27°41′N 83°59′E

Mainakaderi मैनाकडेरी
- Village development committee
- Interactive map of Mainakaderi
- Country: Nepal
- Zone: Sagarmatha Zone
- District: Saptari District

Population (2011)
  - Total: 3,206
- Time zone: UTC+5:45 (Nepal Time)
- Postal code: 56400

Maina Kaderi is a village development committee located in Saptari District of Madhesh province presently and in the Sagarmatha Zone of south-eastern Nepal. At the time of the 2011 Nepal census it had a population of 3,206 people living in 554 individual households.It is the 3rd most literate village of the district.This village has many notable person and places as its attraction some of them include The Chuman Hari Janta Madhyamik School(the second oldest school established of the district), The Chandra Canal bridge, the Mahuli river bridge and some parts of ठाकुर बाबा दह forest. Not only that the ongoing Hulaki highway project also passes through the same village. A suspension bridge has also been established in Barhara of this village for crossing Sunniar river and mobility purposes. Many temples of Durga, Shiva, Hanuman are situated in the village.

Even the Armed Police Force (APF) base camp has been established in the village to maintain peace and tranquility in that area.
