= Lohajara =

Former Village Development Committee in Nepal

Lohajara लोहजारा
- Village development committee
- Location in Nepal
- Coordinates: 26.61°N 86.84°E
- Country: Nepal
- Zone: Sagarmatha Zone
- District: Saptari District

Population (2011)
  - Total: 5,570
- Time zone: UTC+5:45 (Nepal Time)
- Website: www.lohajara.com.np

Lohajara is a village development committee in Saptari District in the Sagarmatha Zone of south-eastern Nepal. At the time of the 2011 Nepal census it had a population of 5,570 people living in 1,071 individual households.
