= Malekpur =

Former Village Development Committee in Nepal

Coordinates: 26.52°N 86.71°E

Malekpur मलेकपुर
- Village development committee
- Interactive map of Malekpur
- Country: Nepal
- Zone: Sagarmatha Zone
- District: Saptari District

Population (2011)
  - Total: 6,601
- Time zone: UTC+5:45 (Nepal Time)

Malekpur is a village development committee in Saptari District in the Sagarmatha Zone of south-eastern Nepal. At the time of the 2011 Nepal census it had a population of 6,601 people living in 1,258 individual households.
