= Pipra (West) =

Pipra (West) पिपरा पश्चिम
- Village development committee
- Location in Nepal
- Coordinates: 26.45°N 86.33°E
- Country: Nepal
- Zone: Sagarmatha Zone
- District: Saptari District

Population (1991)
  - Total: 3,254
- Time zone: UTC+5:45 (Nepal Time)

Pipra (West) is a village development committee in Saptari District in the Sagarmatha Zone of south-eastern Nepal. At the time of the 1991 Nepal census it had a population of 3254 people living in 599 individual households.
