= Nargho =

Former Village Development Committee in Nepal

Coordinates: 26.487720018072114°N 86.67481768384881°E

Nargho नर्घो Rajgardh Nargho
- Village Development Committee (VDC)
- Motto: unity is the best policy
- Interactive map of Nargho
- Country: Nepal
- Zone: Sagarmatha Zone
- District: Saptari District

Government
  - Social worker: Pramanand Yadav(गाउँपालिका प्रमुख), Sunil Kumar Jha(District President, RJP-N)

Population (2078)
  - Total: 7,238
- Time zone: UTC+5:45 (Nepal Time)
- Postal code: 56409
- Area code: 031
- Website: http://www.belhichapenamun.gov.np

Nargho is a village development committee in Saptari District in the Sagarmatha Zone of southeastern Nepal. At the time of the 2021 Nepal census it had a population of 7238 people living in 1606 households. Different caste people like jha, yadav, mandal, sha, ram, karn, paswan, sharma, dom, shada etc., used to live in village. It consists of four subvillages (Puwaritol, Pachhwaritol, Anderi, and Katti). It has three small bazaars but it does not have good road facility. Most of the people are farmers and they grow paddy, wheat, pulses, vegetables, etc. Some of the people used to depend on animal husbandry and fishery to survive.

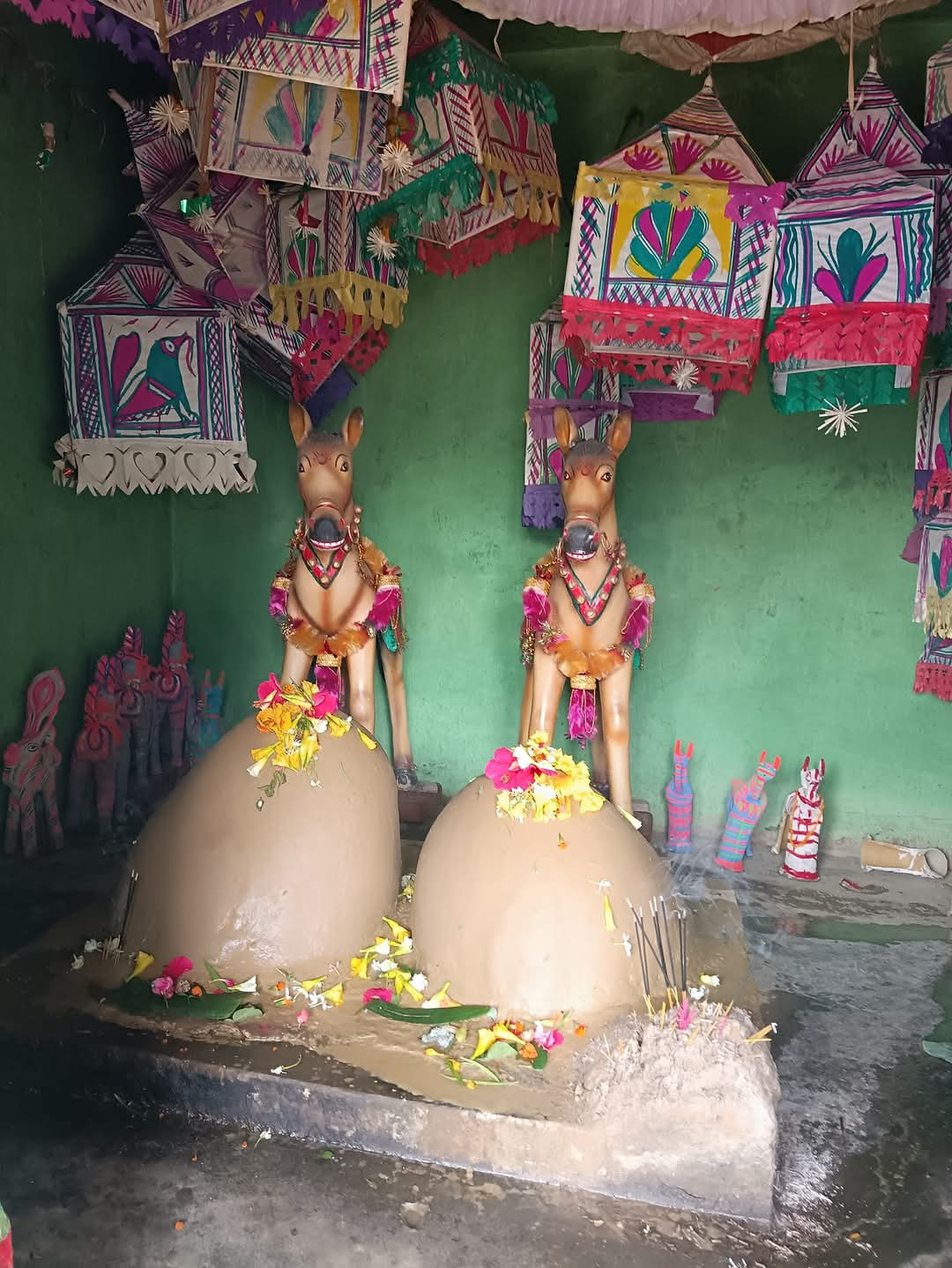
Dihabarthan

== Education ==
There are four governmental school in VDC.

1. Shree janta higher secondary school.
1. Shree janta primary school (in Puwaritol).
2. Shree rastriya prathmic vidhalay

== Economy ==
Mainly peoples of Nargho village depend upon the agriculture and agricultural products sold in the nearest town Rajbiraj about 9.2 km (5.7 mi) from that village.Nearest town;9.3 km SW of Rajbiraj, 21.3 km NxNE of Nirmali, 32.2 km SE of Lahan, 33.9 km S of Triyuga. There are three small chowk (place where goods are sold) within the village. These chowk are:

1. Jhauhura chowk(Near to Indian Border)
2. Purnaa chowk
3. Puchhbari chowk

These chowk are small bazaars and people can sell goods (especially vegetables, fruit, pulses, Fish, meat, earthenware, clothes etc.) two days of per week every chowk and three IME center for remittance transactions.

== Ancient history ==
Actually at ancient time Nargho is called Rajgardh Nargho. It means 'place of King' (royal place) because of the Baise Rajya king who ruled at that time. There are numbers of historical ancient ponds like Ratna Sagar, Jhauhura Sagar, Gonahi Pond etc. which were worshiped by the indigenous people of Nargho from ancient times to the present day because of their myths. Every new year 1st and 2nd of Baisakh (April - May ) indigenous people bring water from Jhauhura Sagar for drinking and cooking purposes but only some drops of water are used for purification of body and soul.

== Gallery ==
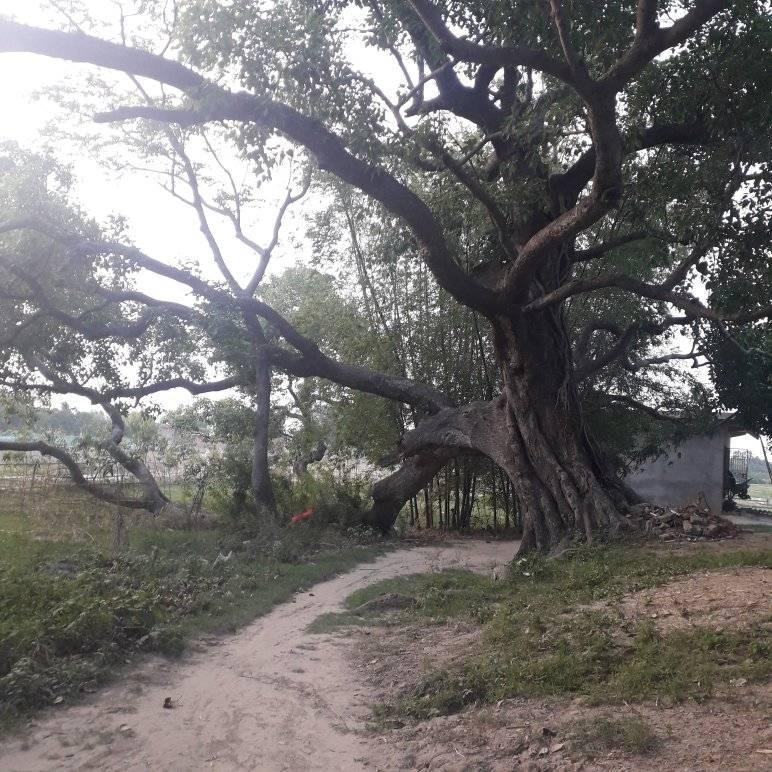
Oldest peepal tree at Dihabarthan Nargho, a symbol of wisdom and nature-loving.

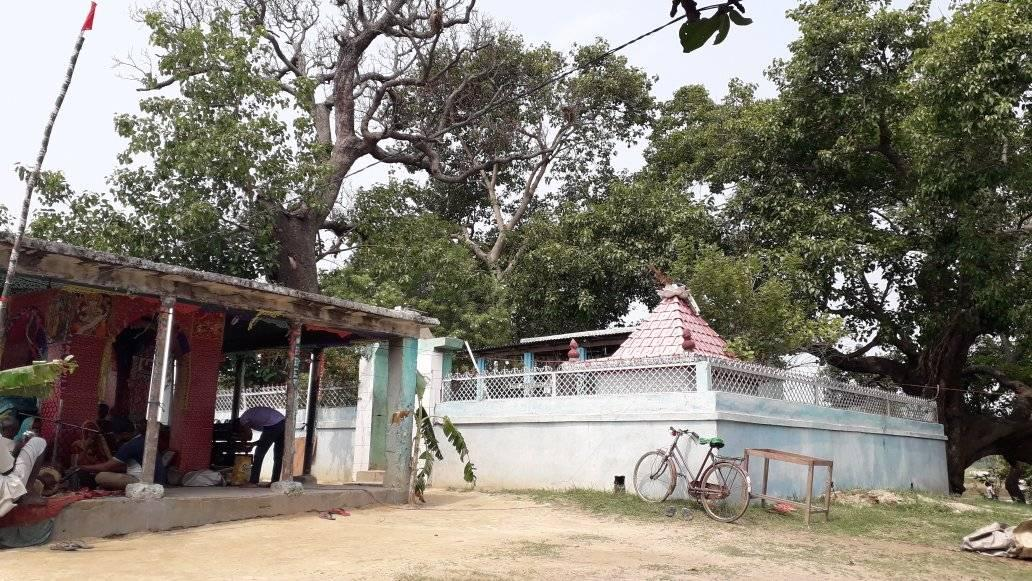
Front view of Dihabarthan from the Eastern to Western side.

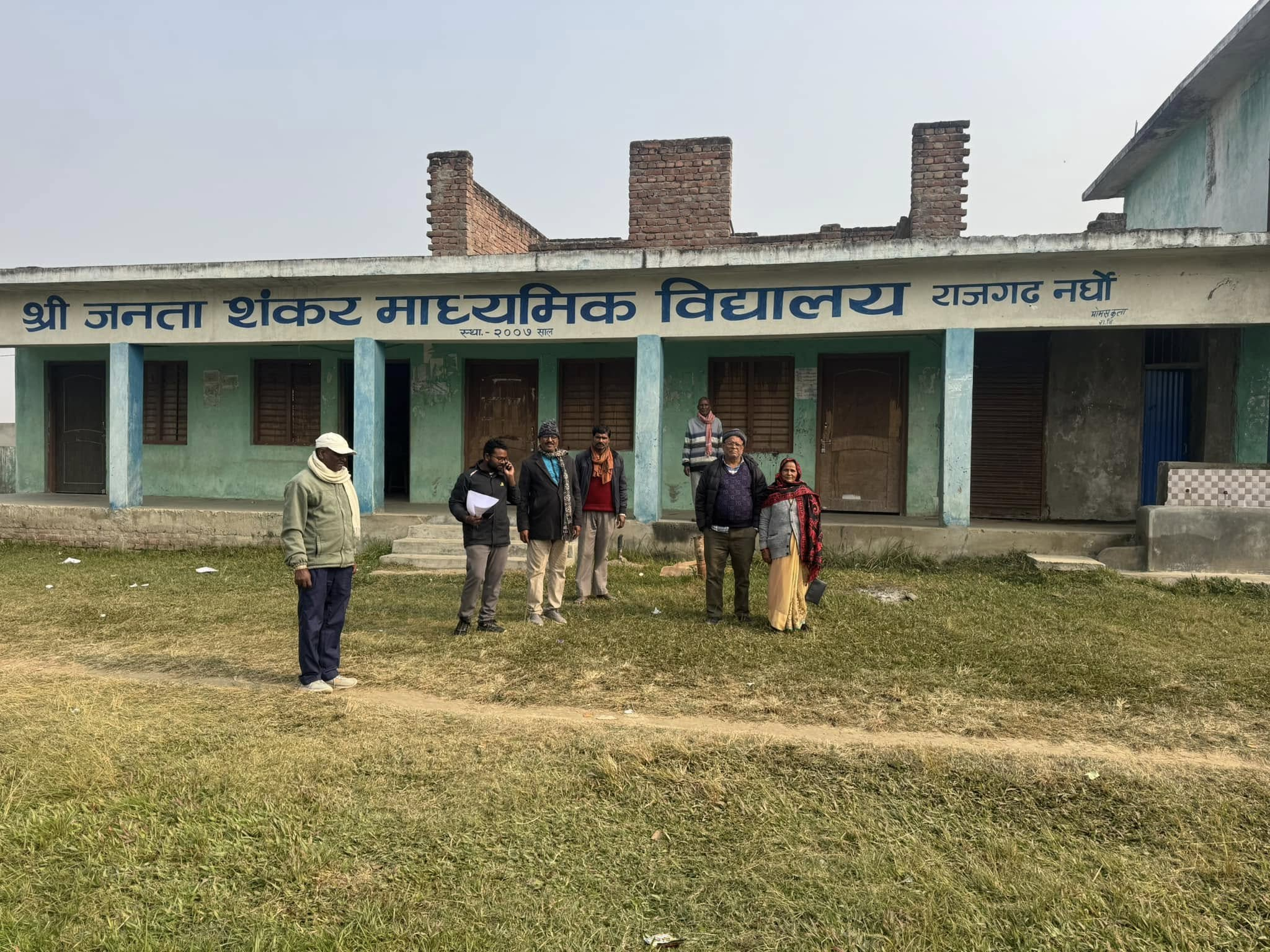
श्री जनता शंकर माध्यमिक बिद्यालय, राज्गढ़ नर्घो
