= Dauda, Nepal =

Former Village Development Committee in Nepal

Coordinates: 26.5667°N 86.8333°E

Dauda दौडा
- Village development committee
- Interactive map of Dauda
- Country: Nepal
- Zone: Sagarmatha Zone
- District: Saptari District

Population (2011)
  - Total: 6,290
- Time zone: UTC+5:45 (Nepal Time)

Dauda is a village development committee in Saptari District in the Sagarmatha Zone of south-eastern Nepal. At the time of the 2011 Nepal census it had a population of 6,290 people living in 1,049 individual households.
