= Mahadeva Rural Municipality =

Former Village Development Committee in Nepal

Coordinates: 26°33′N 86°49′E

Mahadeva महादेवा
- Rural Municipality
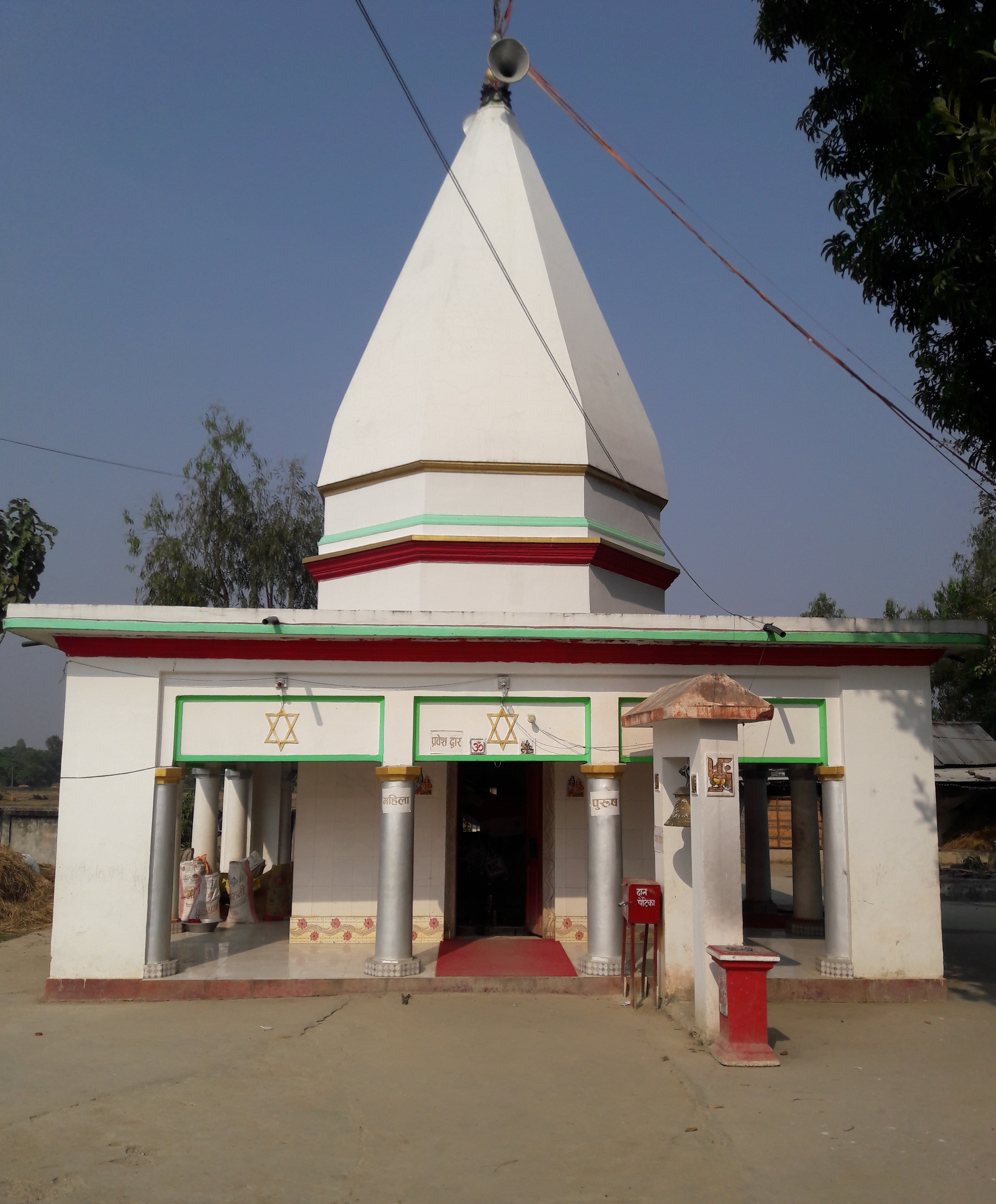
- Ankuri Mahadev Mandir, famous for Hindu pilgrims, is located in Mahadeva Rural Municipality, 2 km north of the way from Hanumannagar to Rajbiraj
- Interactive map of Mahadeva
- Country: Nepal
- Zone: Sagarmatha Zone
- Provinces of Nepal: Province No. 2
- District: Saptari District

Government
  - Type: Local

Population (2011)
  - Total: 5,187
- Time zone: UTC+5:45 (Nepal Time)
- Area code: 031
- Website: https://mahadevamun.gov.np/

Mahadeva is a rural municipality formerly, village development committee in Saptari District in the Sagarmatha Zone of south-eastern Nepal. It is located on the eastern side of the district headquarter Rajbiraj. At the time of the 2011 Nepal census it had a population of 5,187 people living in 1,135 individual households.
