= Bhutahi =

Former Village Development Committee in Nepal

Coordinates: 26.52°N 86.61°E

Bhutahi भुतही
- Village development committee
- Interactive map of Bhutahi
- Country: Nepal
- Zone: Sagarmatha Zone
- District: Saptari District

Population (2011)
  - Total: 4,016
- Time zone: UTC+5:45 (Nepal Time)

Bhutahi is a village development committee in Saptari District in the Sagarmatha Zone of south-eastern Nepal. At the time of the 2011 Nepal census it had a population of 4,016 people living in 785 individual households.
