= Malhanama =

Malhanama मल्हनाम
- Village development committee
- Location in Nepal
- Coordinates: 26.66°N 86.55°E
- Country: Nepal
- Zone: Sagarmatha Zone
- District: Saptari District

Population (2011)
  - Total: 4,356
- Time zone: UTC+5:45 (Nepal Time)

Malhanama is a village development committee in Saptari District in the Sagarmatha Zone of south-eastern Nepal. At the time of the 2011 Nepal census it had a population of 4,356 people living in 782 individual households.
