= Badgama =

Former Village Development Committee in Nepal

Coordinates: 26.61°N 86.91°E

Badgama बदगामा
- Interactive map of Badgama
- Country: Nepal
- Zone: Sagarmatha Zone
- District: Saptari District

Population (1991)
  - Total: 3,287
- Time zone: UTC+5:45 (Nepal Time)

Badgama is a village and market center in Kanchanrup Municipality in Saptari District in the Sagarmatha Zone of south-eastern Nepal. It was merged in the municipality along with other 8 Villages since 18 May 2013. At the time of the 1991 Nepal census it had a population of 3287 people living in 550 individual households.
