= Parasbani =

Coordinates: 26.5833°N 86.8167°E

Parasbani पारसवनी
- Village development committee
- Interactive map of Parasbani
- Country: Nepal
- Zone: Sagarmatha Zone
- District: Saptari District

Population (1991)
  - Total: 4,652
- Time zone: UTC+5:45 (Nepal Time)

Parasbani is a village development committee in Saptari District in the Sagarmatha Zone of south-eastern Nepal. At the time of the 1991 Nepal census it had a population of 4652 people living in 873 individual households.
