= Belhi, Saptari =

Village development committee in Sagarmatha Zone, Nepal

Belhi बेलही
- Village development committee
- Location in Nepal
- Coordinates: 26.55°N 86.51°E
- Country: Nepal
- Zone: Sagarmatha Zone
- District: Saptari District

Population (2011)
  - Total: 4,366
- Time zone: UTC+5:45 (Nepal Time)

Belhi is a village development committee in Saptari District in the Sagarmatha Zone of south-eastern Nepal. At the time of the 2011 Nepal census it had a population of 4366 people living in 721 individual households.
