= Jagatpur, Saptari =

Jagatpur जगतपुर
- Interactive map of Jagatpur
- Coordinates: 26.38°N 86.55°E
- Country: Nepal
- Province: Province No. 2
- District: Saptari District

Population (1991)
  - Total: 3,699
- Time zone: UTC+5:45 (Nepal Time)

Jagatpur is a village and market center in Kanchan Roop Municipality in Saptari District in the Sagarmatha Zone of south-eastern Nepal. It was merged in the municipality along with other 8 Villages since 18 May 2013. At the time of the 1991 Nepal census it had a population of 3699 people residing in 662 individual households.
