= Launiya =

Former Village Development Committee in Nepal

Launiya लौनिया
- Village development committee
- Location in Nepal
- Coordinates: 26.48°N 86.77°E
- Country: Nepal
- Zone: Sagarmatha Zone
- District: Saptari District

Population (2011)
  - Total: 3,519
- Time zone: UTC+5:45 (Nepal Time)

Launiya is a village development committee in Saptari District in the Sagarmatha Zone of south-eastern Nepal. At the time of the 2011 Nepal census it had a population of 3,519 people living in 707 individual households.
