= Kataiya, Nepal =

Ward in the Rupani Rural Municipality

Kataiya कटैया Hardiya Kataiya
- Rupani Rural Municipality Kataiya, Ward-3
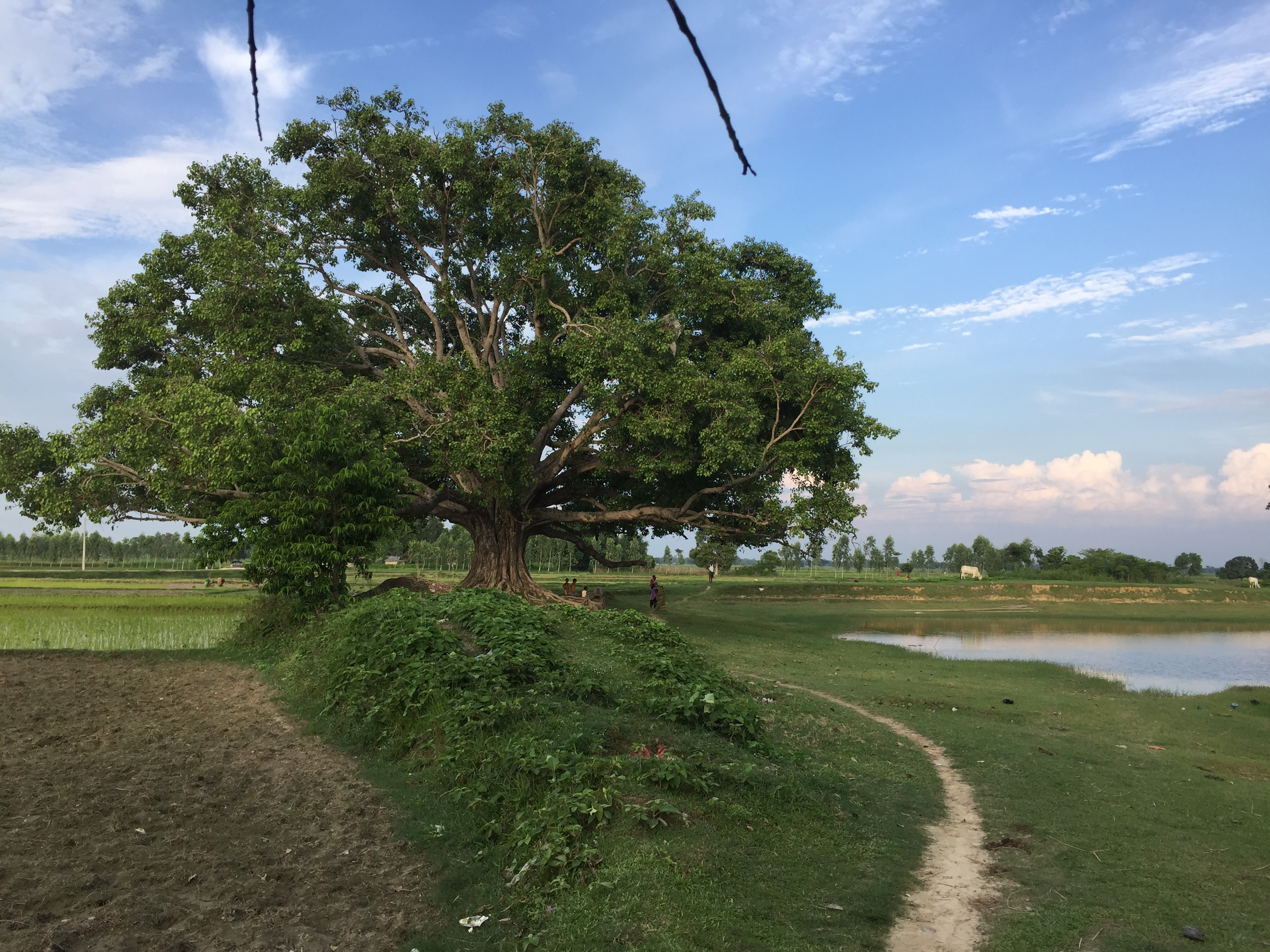
- Ghibaha(Peeple) Pond

- Location in Nepal
- Coordinates: 26.58°N 86.70°E
- Country: Nepal
- Development Region: Eastern Dev. Region/EDR Recently, In Province No. 2
- Zone: Sagarmatha Zone
- District: Saptari District

Area
  - Total: 15 km^{2} (5.8 sq mi)
- Elevation: 77.5 m (254 ft)

Population (2011AD)
  - Total: 9,554
  - Density: 640/km^{2} (1,600/sq mi)
- Time zone: UTC+5:45 (NST)
- Area code: district code i.e. 031
- Website: www.apankataiya.com

Kataiya ((In Nepali: कटैया)) is a village development committee (VDC) in the central part of Saptari in the Sagarmatha Zone of south-eastern part of Nepal. This VDC is about 5 km south of Rupani bazaar, a bazaar through which the East-West Highway passes and about 15 km north of Indo-Nepal border. It is about 8 km north-west of the headquarter of Saptari district as well as Sagarmatha zone, Rajbiraj. The VDC comprises 9 wards. It lies in Illaka No. 11. On the basis of 2011AD. census, there are 9,554 population living in about 1,500 individuals houses.

== Climate ==
Kataiya VDC has particularly a tropical climate. The three main seasons, summer, monsoon and winter respectively. Being located in the Plain (Terai) lands of Nepal, the climate and weather of Kataiya is usually hot. The summer season runs from Early April to August and touches temperature ranging from 23 °C (73 °F) to 44 °C (111 °F). Monsoons arrive in the month of July heralded by dust and thunderstorms. The winter season prevails from the month of October till the month of March. Humidity, which prevails during monsoons, diminishes at the arrival of winters. The village observes pleasant sunny days and enjoyable cool nights with the temperature ranging from 6 °C (41 °F) to 30 °C (86 °F).

Kataiya winter season is the most pleasant time. Overall the January is the coldest month and June is the most hottest month in the year.

Climate data for Shree DinaRam Bhadri Stadium (2016)
Month	Jan	Feb	Mar	Apr	May	Jun	Jul	Aug	Sep	Oct	Nov	Dec	Year
Mean daily maximum °C (°F)	21.5 (70.7)	25.4 (77.7)	29.9 (85.8)	33.1 (91.6)	33.7 (92.7)	31.8 (89.2)	31.7 (89.1)	31.4 (88.5)	31.0 (87.8)	30.2 (86.4)	26.2 (79.2)	24.1 (75.4)	29.2 (84.5)
Mean daily minimum °C (°F)	8.0 (46.4)	10.1 (50.2)	12.6 (54.7)	18.4 (65.1)	22.3 (72.1)	24.2 (75.6)	24.6 (76.3)	24.4 (75.9)	23.6 (74.5)	20.8 (69.4)	12.4 (54.3)	9.2 (48.6)	17.6 (63.6)
Average precipitation mm (inches)	12.7 (0.50)	14.2 (0.56)	17.2 (0.68)	56.1 (2.21)	189.0 (7.44)	320.4 (12.61)	545.8 (21.49)	384.3 (15.13)	299.8 (11.80)	92.8 (3.65)	6.8 (0.27)	5.4 (0.21)	1,944.5 (76.55)
Source: Department of Hydrology and Meteorology (Nepal)

== Festivals And Celebrations ==
Major religious celebrations include the major Hindu festivals Vijaya Dashami, Dipawali, Chhath, Holi, Ram Navmi, Janai Purnima or Rakshabandhan, Saraswati Puja or Vasant Panchami, Jeetia, Chauth Chandra, Vishwakarma Puja, Govardhan Puja, Bhai Tika, Chaite Dashain and so on. The Dashain, Deepawali, Chhath and Holi are heavily celebrated with full devotee and proper rules. The locals people take pride in the way these festivals are celebrated with joy and happiness.

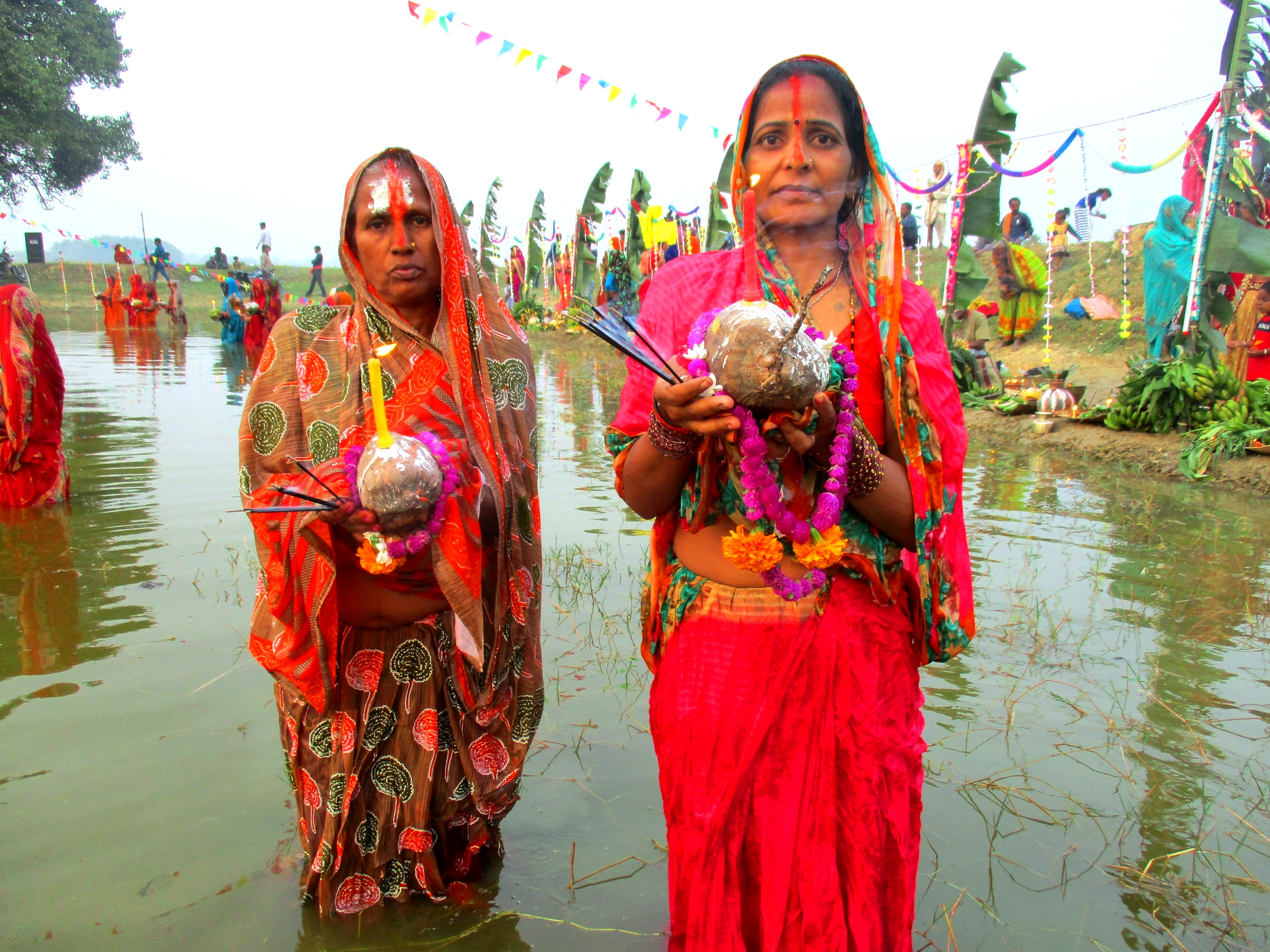
Celebrating Chhath in Kataiya, Saptari by giving Argha to Sun God

=== Temples ===
There are many small temples including dihabar sthan, rajaji, hanuman temple, dinaram bhadri temple. Dinaram Bhadri is the deity god of Musahar people.

== Health ==
The VDC has a health post with ward volunteers.

The health post provides regular vaccination program and monthly vaccination programs at different places throughout the VDC with the help of Women volunteer. It provides medicines to the poor people. It also provides birth control device like condoms and pills at zero cost. In severe case, patients are referred to Gajendra Narayan Singh Sagarmatha Zonal Hospital (a zonal hospital) located in Rajbiraj which is only a few kilometres away.

== Education ==
There are few secondary schools in this area including Madhyamik Vidhyalaya Kataiya Hardia. Lower secondary schools and primary schools like Oriental English Boarding School, Shree Luvkush E.B.S., etc providing education facilities to the children.

== Communication ==
Telecommunications services include Nepal Telecom, Ncell and UTL. Subisu is providing internet services in place. To promote local culture and news, the number of nearby FM radio stations like:

(1) Bhorukuwa FM
(2) Chhinnamasta FM
(3) Apan FM
(4) C FM
(5) Chandrama FM
(6) Jai Madhesh FM
(7) Radio Sakhi, etc.

and other FM radio stations like:

(1) Kantipur FM
(2) Image FM
(3) Saptakoshi FM
(4) Radio Nepal
(5) Ujyalo Network, etc.

are providing linkage to worldwide media access.
