= Saptakoshi Municipality =

Saptakoshi सप्तकोशी (Nepali)
- Municipality
- Municipality in Nepal
- Location in Nepal
- Coordinates: 26.71°N 86.89°E
- Country: Nepal
- Development Region: Eastern
- Zone: Sagarmatha
- District: Saptari
- Province: Madhesh
- Municipality: Saptakoshi

Government
  - Mayor: Krishna Prasad Dhakal (NC)
  - Deputy Mayor: Rita Kumari Chaudhary (NC)

Area
  - Total: 60.25 km^{2} (23.26 sq mi)

Population (2017)
  - Total: 27,139
  - Density: 450.4/km^{2} (1,167/sq mi)
  - Religions: Hindu Muslim Christian

Languages
  - Local: Maithili, Tharu, Nepali
- Time zone: UTC+5:45 (NST)
- Postal Code: 56403
- Area code: 031
- Website: www.saptakoshimun.gov.np

Saptakoshi Municipality (Nepali: सप्तकोशी नगरपालिका) is located in Saptari District in the Province 2 of Nepal. It was formed in 2014 and then again modified in 2016 occupying current 11 sections (wards) from previous 11 wards. It occupies an area of 60.25 km^{2} (23.26 sq mi) with a total population of 21,139.
