= Chhinnamasta Rural Municipality =

Former Village Development Committee in Nepal

Chhinnamasta, Nepal छिन्नमस्ता
- Village development committee
- Location in Nepal
- Coordinates: 26.45°N 86.72°E
- Country: Nepal
- Zone: Sagarmatha Zone
- District: Saptari District

Population (2011)
  - Total: 10,136
- Time zone: UTC+5:45 (Nepal Time)
- Postal code: 56408
- Area code: 031
- Website: http://www.chhinnamastamun.gov.np/

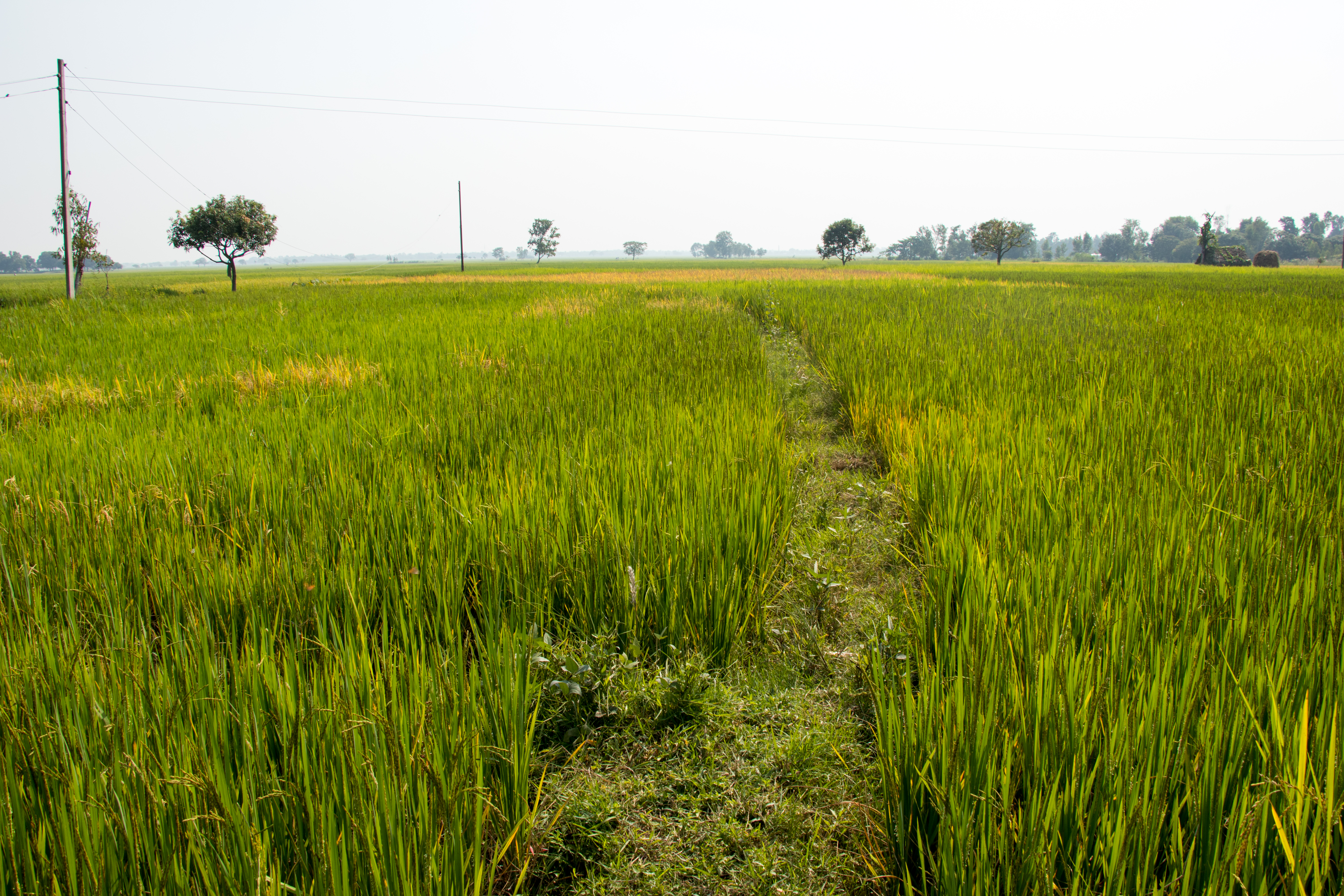
Paddy field in Chhinnamasta

Chhinnamasta is a village development committee in Saptari District in the Sagarmatha Zone of south-eastern Nepal. At the time of the 2011 Nepal census it had a population of 10,136 people living in 1,916 individual households.

The goddess Chhinnamasta is popular throughout Nepal and part of India. From the capital of Nepal it is in 482 km east. From Rajbiraj it is in 10 km south.
