= Pakari, Saptari =

Village development committee in Sagarmatha Zone, Nepal

Pakari पकरी
- Village development committee
- Location in Nepal
- Coordinates: 26.56°N 86.80°E
- Country: Nepal
- Zone: Sagarmatha Zone
- District: Saptari District

Population (1991)
  - Total: 4,641
- Time zone: UTC+5:45 (Nepal Time)

Pakari is a village development committee in Saptari District in the Sagarmatha Zone of south-eastern Nepal. At the time of the 1991 Nepal census it had a population of 4,641 people living in 810 individual households.
