= Deurimaruwa =

Former Village Development Committee in Nepal

Deuribharuwa देउरीभरुवा Bharuwa
- Village development committee
- Location in Nepal
- Coordinates: 26.52°N 86.79°E
- Country: Nepal
- Zone: Sagarmatha Zone
- District: Saptari District

Population (2011)
  - Total: 3,331
- Time zone: UTC+5:45 (Nepal Time)

Deuribharuwa is a village development committee in Saptari District in the Sagarmatha Zone of south-eastern Nepal. At the time of the 2011 Nepal census, it had a population of 3,331 people living in 542 individual households.
