= Terahota =

Terahota तेराहोता
- Village development committee
- Location in Nepal
- Coordinates: 26.63°N 86.74°E
- Country: Nepal
- Zone: Sagarmatha Zone
- District: Saptari District

Population (1991)
  - Total: 3,842
- Time zone: UTC+5:45 (Nepal Time)

Terahota, spelled as Terhauta (तेरहौता), is a village development committee in Saptari District in the Sagarmatha Zone of south-eastern Nepal. At the time of the 1991 Nepal census it had a population of 3842 people living in 689 individual households.

The village currently lies within the Rupani Rural Municipality and under the new structure it's ward number 6 of the rural municipality. To the north of the village is Kolhuwa Village while in the south-east is Hariharpur Village and in its south flows the Khando river with Basbitti and Musharniya Villages to the further south. To the west are Rayapur and Bhatiniya Villages.

The population comprises mainly Tharus, Thakurs, Bishwakarmas, Bhagats, and Musahars.
