= Mauwaha =

Former Village Development Committee in Nepal

Mauwaha मौवाहा
- Village development committee
- Location in Nepal
- Coordinates: 26.57°N 86.52°E
- Country: Nepal
- Zone: Sagarmatha Zone
- District: Saptari District

Population (2011)
  - Total: 5,079
- Time zone: UTC+5:45 (Nepal Time)

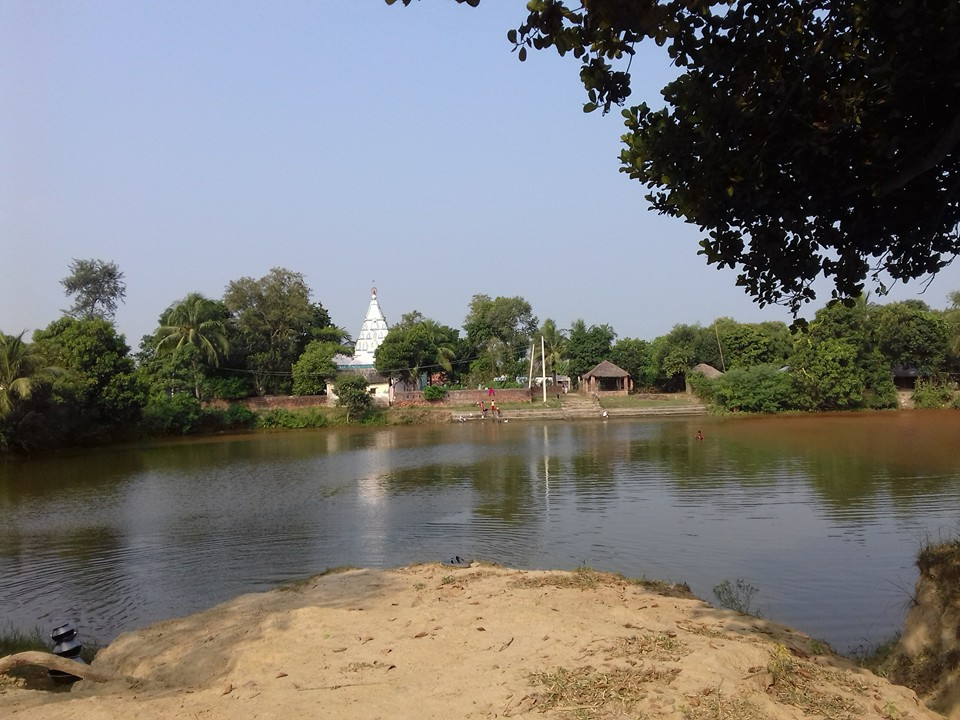
the famous panchadevata mandir(temple of five gods) in mauwaha village

Mauwaha is a village development committee in Saptari District in the Sagarmatha Zone of south-eastern Nepal. At the time of the 2011 Nepal census it had a population of 5,079 people living in 884 individual households. Mouwaha VDC is home of Nepal's first vice president Parmanand jha. Village is densely populated by nearly 5000 peoples. Various castes such as Bramhins, mandal, yadav, sah, dom, mushaar etc. living in the village. Vdc shows all the features of a developed village as it has got road, electricity, water, mobile tower, schools, health post etc.
