= Haripur, Saptari =

Former Village Development Committee in Nepal

Haripur हरिपुर
- Village development committee
- Interactive map of Haripur
- Country: Nepal
- Zone: Sagarmatha Zone
- District: Saptari District

Population (2011)
  - Total: 5,406
- Time zone: UTC+5:45 (Nepal Time)

Haripur is a village development committee in Saptari District in the Sagarmatha Zone of south-eastern Nepal. At the time of the 2011 Nepal census it had a population of 5,406 people living in 979 individual households.
