= Simraha Sigiyaun =

Coordinates: 26°30′N 86°42′E

Simraha Sigiyaun सिम्राहा सिगियौन
- Village development committee
- Interactive map of Simraha Sigiyaun
- Country: Nepal
- Zone: Sagarmatha Zone
- District: Saptari District

Government
  - Type: sah
  - Teli: Rahul Sah

Population (1991)
  - Total: 4,487
- Time zone: UTC+5:45 (Nepal Time)

Simraha Sigiyaun is a village development committee in Saptari District in the Sagarmatha Zone of south-eastern Nepal. At the time of the 1991 Nepal census it had a population of 4487.
