= Jhutaki =

Former Village Development Committee in Nepal

Jhutaki झुटकी
- Village development committee
- Location in Nepal
- Coordinates: 26.48°N 86.65°E
- Country: Nepal
- Zone: Sagarmatha Zone
- District: Saptari District

Population (2018)
  - Total: 8,000
- Time zone: UTC+5:45 (Nepal Time)
- Postal code: 56400

Jhutaki is a village development committee in Saptari District in the Sagarmatha Zone of south-eastern Nepal. At the time of the 1991 Nepal census it had a population of 8,000 people living in 800 individual households. Different caste people like Yadav, mandal, sha, ram, mallah, sharma, dom, shada etc., used to live in village. It consists of four subvillages (Puwaritol, Pachhwaritol, jhutaki, and kajaratole). It has three small bazaars but it does not have good road facility.[1] Most of the people are farmers and they grow paddy, wheat, pulses, vegetables, etc. Some of the people used to depend on animal husbandry and fishery to survive. Economy Most of the people involved in farming, animal husbandry and fishing.
