= Bathnaha, Saptari =

Former Village Development Committee in Nepal

Coordinates: 26°34′N 86°49′E

Bathnaha बथनाहा
- Village development committee
- Interactive map of Bathnaha
- Country: Nepal
- Zone: Sagarmatha Zone
- District: Saptari District

Population (2011)
  - Total: 5,011
- Time zone: UTC+5:45 (Nepal Time)

Bathnaha is a village development committee in Saptari District in the Sagarmatha Zone of south-eastern Nepal. At the time of the 2011 Nepal census it had a population of 5,011 people living in 1,180 individual households.
