= Basbiti =

Basbati बसबिट्टी
- Village development committee
- Location in Nepal
- Coordinates: 26.59°N 86.75°E
- Country: Nepal
- Zone: Sagarmatha Zone
- District: Saptari District

Population (2011)
  - Total: 3,666
- Time zone: UTC+5:45 (Nepal Time)

Basbitti is a village development committee in Saptari District in the Sagarmatha Zone of south-eastern Nepal. At the time of the 2011 Nepal census it had a population of 3,666 people living in 683 individual households. The village is located 5 km south of Rupani and 5 km north from Rajbiraj (the headquarters of Saptari district). Rupani and Rajbiraj are connected by the road RamLaxam marg and the village is situated east to the road. The people of this village are either from Hindu (the castes like Kayastha, Yadav, Sharma, Mandal, Brahman, Bhagat, Chaudhary, Teli) or from Muslim society. It has only one secondary school and a madarsha (a school in which children are educated in Urdu and about Islam). One industrial state is also located at this vdc named as Gajendra Narayan Singh industrial state (named after the late person and founder member of Nepal Sadbhawana party) which was built with the joint co-operation of Nepal government and India government. The literacy percent of this village is low but day by day the literacy percent is increasing. The life style of this village is simple. The main business of the people is farming and working at golf country. People from the Hindu community celebrate feasts like Dashain, Tihar, Krishanasthami, Chhath, and people from the Muslim society celebrate feasts like Ramjan And Bakrid.
