= Lalapati =

Village development committee in Sagarmatha Zone, Nepal

Coordinates: 26.46°N 86.74°E

Lalapati लालपाटी
- Village development committee
- Interactive map of Lalapati
- Country: Nepal
- Zone: Sagarmatha Zone
- District: Saptari District

Population (2011)
  - Total: 5,509
- Time zone: UTC+5:45 (Nepal Time)

Lalapati is a village development committee in Saptari District in the Sagarmatha Zone of south-eastern Nepal. At the time of the 2011 Nepal census it had a population of 5,509 people living in 996 individual households. After newly formed lower administrative division, Lalapati belongs to Chhinnamasta Gaunpalika as Ward No.4. lalapatti laleswarnath mahadev
