= Ghoghanpur =

Former Village Development Committee in Nepal

Ghoghanpur धोधनपुर
- Location in Nepal
- Coordinates: 26.68°N 86.93°E
- Country: Nepal
- Zone: Sagarmatha Zone
- District: Saptari District

Population (1991)
  - Total: 3,860
- Time zone: UTC+5:45 (Nepal Time)

Ghoghanpur is a village and market center in Kanchan Rup Municipality in Saptari District in the Sagarmatha Zone of south-eastern Nepal. It was merged in the municipality along with other 8 Villages since 18 May 2013. At the time of the 1991 Nepal census it had a population of 3860 people living in 703 individual households.
