= Dhanagadi =

Former Village Development Committee in Nepal

Coordinates: 26.6000°N 86.5667°E

Dhanagadi धनगढी
- Village development committee
- Interactive map of Dhanagadi
- Country: Nepal
- Zone: Sagarmatha Zone
- District: Saptari District

Population (2011)
  - Total: 5,201
- Time zone: UTC+5:45 (Nepal Time)

Dhanagadi is a village development committee in Saptari District in the Sagarmatha Zone of south-eastern Nepal. At the time of the 2011 Nepal census it had a population of 5,201 people living in 954 individual households.
