= Barsain =

Village development committee in Sagarmatha Zone, Nepal

Coordinates: 26.5100°N 86.7500°E

Barsain बर्साइन
- Village development committee
- Interactive map of Barsain
- Country: Nepal
- Zone: Sagarmatha Zone
- District: Saptari District

Population (2011)
  - Total: 5,458
- Time zone: UTC+5:45 (Nepal Time)

Barsain is a village development committee in Saptari District in the Sagarmatha Zone of south-eastern Nepal. At the time of the 2011 Nepal census it had a population of 5458 people living in 991 individual households.
