= Bhagawatpur =

Former Village Development Committee in Nepal

Bhagawatpur भागवतपुर
- Village development committee
- Location in Nepal
- Coordinates: 26.55°N 86.84°E
- Country: Nepal
- Zone: Sagarmatha Zone
- District: Saptari District

Population (2011)
  - Total: 5,022
- Time zone: UTC+5:45 (Nepal Time)
- Postal code: 56406
- Area code: 031

Bhagawatpur is a village development committee in Saptari District in the Sagarmatha Zone of south-eastern Nepal. At the time of the 2011 Nepal census it had a population of 5,022 people living in 968 individual households.
