= Theliya =

Theliya ठेलिया
- Location in Nepal
- Coordinates: 26.65°N 86.86°E
- Country: Nepal
- Zone: Sagarmatha Zone
- District: Saptari District

Population (1991)
  - Total: 4,680
- Time zone: UTC+5:45 (Nepal Time)

Theliya is a village and market center in Kanchan Roop Municipality in Saptari District in the Sagarmatha Zone of south-eastern Nepal. It was merged in the municipality along with other 8 Villages since 18 May 2013. At the time of the 1991 Nepal census it had a population of 4680 people living in 848 individual households.
