= Phulkahi =

Coordinates: 26.57°N 86.56°E

Phulkahi फुल्कही
- Village development committee
- Interactive map of Phulkahi
- Country: Nepal
- Zone: Sagarmatha Zone
- District: Saptari District

Population (1991)
  - Total: 3,451
- Time zone: UTC+5:45 (Nepal Time)

Phulkahi is a village development committee in Saptari District in the Sagarmatha Zone of south-eastern Nepal. At the time of the 1991 Nepal census it had a population of 3451 people living in 679 individual households.
