= Phattepur, Saptari =

Phattepur Phattepur
- Phattepur
- Location in Nepal
- Coordinates: 26.72°N 86.93°E
- Country: Nepal
- Zone: Sagarmatha Zone
- District: Saptari District

Population (1991)
  - Total: 8,312
- Time zone: UTC+5:45 (Nepal Time)

Phattepur is a village development committee in Saptari District in the Sagarmatha Zone of south-eastern Nepal. At the time of the 2011 Nepal census it had a population of 11303 people(5268 male and 6035 female) living in 2524 individual households. The Phattepur village development committee is now a part of Saptakoshi Municipality. The Saptakoshi Municipality is located in the Madhesh Province.
