= Ranju Yadav =

Nepali artist (born 1986)

Ranju Yadav (born 1986) is a Nepali Mithila artist, social activist, and recipient of the National Fine Art Award. Through the traditional visual language of Mithila painting, her works focus on highlighting social issues such as dowry, child marriage, caste discrimination, female feticide, and gender-based violence. Her work integrates traditional Mithila art with contemporary social commentary.

== Early life and education ==
Yadav was born in 1986 in Saptari District, Madhesh Province, Nepal. She learned Mithila painting from her mother, grandmother, and other women in her family, following the long-standing tradition in which the art form is passed down through generations of women. Her early exposure to the paintings that decorated household walls and courtyards laid the foundation for her later artistic career.

Growing up in rural Madhesh, Yadav witnessed the effects of dowry-related violence, gender-based discrimination, and other social inequalities. These experiences later became central themes in her artwork, which seeks to raise awareness about issues affecting women and marginalized communities.

== Career ==
Yadav began working as a professional artist after receiving encouragement from fellow Mithila artist Ajit Sah. Rather than limiting Mithila painting to its traditional use on household walls and floors, she started producing works on paper and canvas, making them suitable for exhibitions and permanent collections.

Her first solo exhibition, Colours of Change, was held at the Nepal Art Council in Kathmandu in 2019. The exhibition presented 29 paintings that explored issues such as women's rights, social inequality, dowry, and child marriage through the visual vocabulary of Mithila art. The exhibition attracted national media attention and established Yadav as one of a growing number of Mithila artists using the tradition to engage with contemporary social issues.

Over the years, Yadav has participated in exhibitions and cultural exchange programs both in Nepal and abroad. Her paintings have been displayed in Bangladesh, Myanmar, the Maldives, Germany, Denmark, and Finland, where they have been featured as examples of Nepal's Mithila artistic tradition.

== Artistic Style ==
Yadav's work combines the visual characteristics of traditional Mithila painting with commentary on present-day social issues. Her paintings frequently address dowry, child marriage, caste discrimination, untouchability, women's empowerment, female feticide, gender equality, and social justice.

Although her subject matter reflects contemporary concerns, Yadav continues to use traditional Mithila (also Madhubani) motifs such as fish, peacocks, lotus flowers, geometric patterns, and intricate decorative borders. Art writers have noted that her work demonstrates how Mithila painting has evolved from a domestic folk tradition into a medium for public dialogue and social advocacy.

== National & International Recognition ==
- National Fine Art Award (2019): Ranju won this top honor in the traditional artwork category at the National Fine Arts Exhibition, hosted by the Nepal Academy of Fine Arts (NAFA).
- Fifty Influential Women of Nepal (2024): She was named one of the country's influential female trailblazers for using folk art to fight gender violence, featured on Nepalian Art's Profile Highlights.

She has also represented Nepal in regional and international exhibitions and cultural programs promoting Mithila art and Nepali cultural heritage.

== Selected Exhibitions ==
A chronological history of her solo, group, and curatorial projects includes:

- 2018 — Nepal Art Fair (Bangladesh): A regional cross-border showcase introducing Nepali folk aesthetics to international art buyers, as reported by The Rising Nepal's Artist Spotlight.
- 2019 — Colors of Change (Nepal): Her debut solo gallery showcase exhibiting 29 distinct, message-driven paintings at the Nepal Art Council.
- 2010 — SAARC Art Exhibition & Workshop (Maldives): Represented Nepal in a regional South Asian cultural exchange framework, detailed in her Museum of Nepali Art Archive.
- 2024 — Multi-National European Art Tour: A consecutive 33-day diplomatic and cultural tour across major cities including Frankfurt and Berlin in Germany, Copenhagen in Denmark, and Helsinki in Finland. Her final European tour stop featured 40 customized canvas pieces, archived via Sahityapost English News.
- 2025 — Nepal International Art Exhibition (Nepal): Stepped behind the scenes as the primary Exhibition Coordinator for a major multinational group event that brought dozens of regional works to NAFA.
- 2026 — From Mountain to Sea International Art Exhibition (Bangladesh): Ranju served as a virtual special guest and speaker for this cross-border exhibition held at Safiuddin Shilpalaya in Dhaka. The showcase featured acrylic-on-canvas works from eight Nepali artists created under her leadership during the Mithila Art Workshop 2025, highlighted by The Rising Nepal's Feature.
- 2026 — Kathmandu Art Biennale (Nepal): Contributed her unique canvas patterns and modern heritage compositions to this massive national visual arts gathering, showcased via the Kathmandu Art Biennale Gallery Updates.
