= Jamuni Madhapura =

Former Village Development Committee in Nepal

Jamuni Madhepura जमुनी मधेपुरा
- Village development committee
- Interactive map of Jamuni Madhepura
- Coordinates: 26.32°N 86.43°E
- Country: Nepal
- Zone: Sagarmatha Zone
- District: Saptari District

Population (2011)
  - Total: 7,766
- Time zone: UTC+5:45 (Nepal Time)

Jamuni Madhapura is a village development committee in Saptari District in the Sagarmatha Zone of south-eastern Nepal. At the time of the 2011 Nepal census it had a population of 7,766 people living in 1,342 individual households.
