= Arnaha, Saptari =

Former Village Development Committee in Nepal

Arnaha अर्नाहा
- Village development committee
- Location in Nepal
- Coordinates: 26.57°N 86.65°E
- Country: Nepal
- Zone: Sagarmatha Zone
- District: Saptari District

Population (2011)
  - Total: 3,768
- Time zone: UTC+5:45 (Nepal Time)
- Postal code: 56413
- Area code: +977-031
- Website: Official website

Arnaha is a village development committee in Saptari District in the Sagarmatha Zone of south-eastern Nepal. At the time of the 2011 Nepal census it had a population of 3768 people living in 627 individual households.
