= Maleth =

Former Village Development Committee in Nepal

Maleth मलेठ
- Village development committee
- Location in Nepal
- Coordinates: 26.56°N 86.75°E
- Country: Nepal
- Zone: Sagarmatha Zone
- District: Saptari District

Population (2011)
  - Total: 6,696
- Time zone: UTC+5:45 (Nepal Time)

Maleth is a village development committee in Saptari District in the Sagarmatha Zone of south-eastern Nepal. At the time of the 2011 Nepal census it had a population of 6,696 people living in 1,142 individual households.
