= Boriya =

Former Village Development Committee in Nepal

Boriya बोरिया
- Village development committee
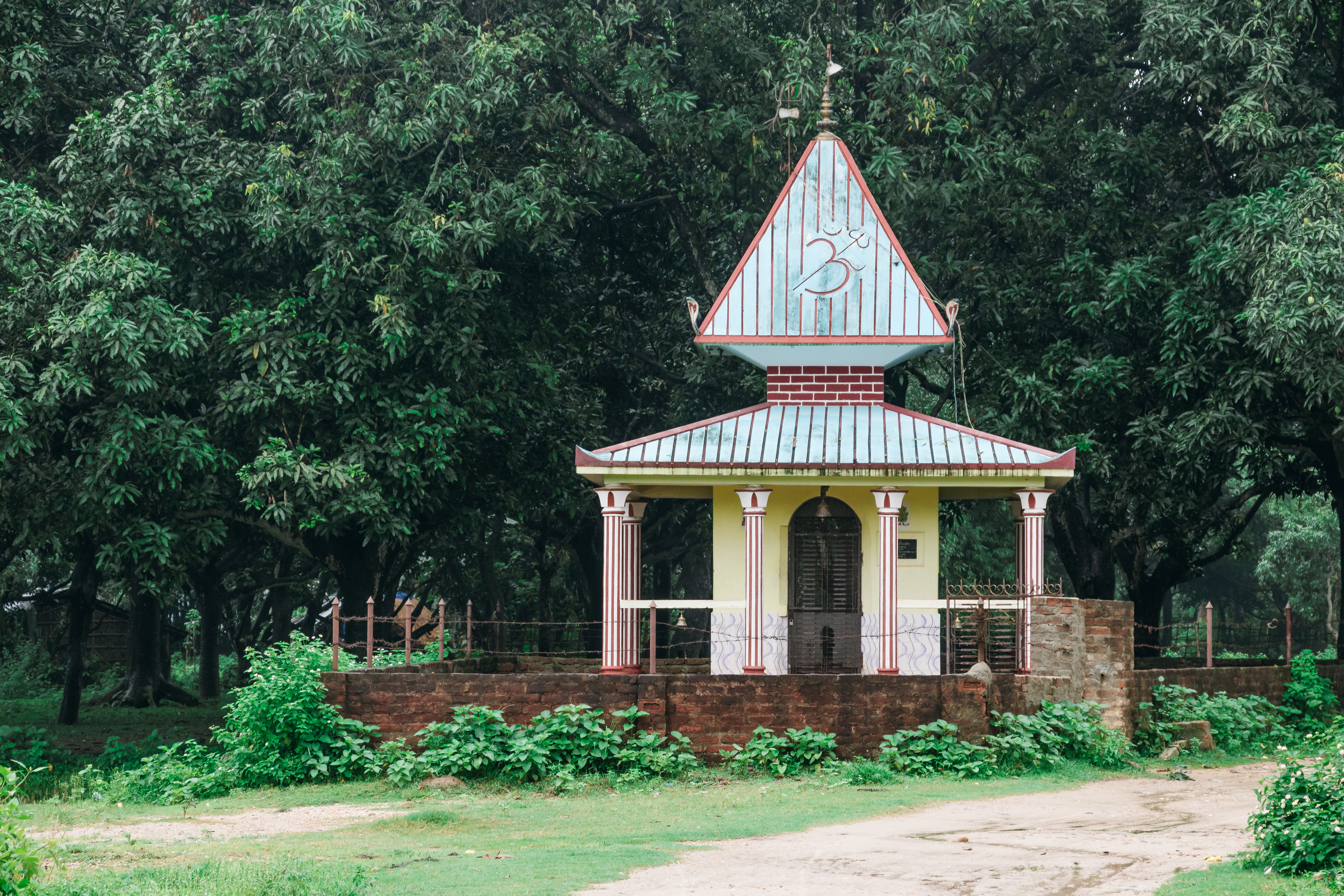
- Lord Shiva Temple in Boriya VDC

- Location in Nepal
- Coordinates: 26.51°N 86.72°E
- Country: Nepal
- Zone: Sagarmatha Zone
- District: Saptari District

Population (2011)
  - Total: 4,849
- Time zone: UTC+5:45 (Nepal Time)

Boriya is a village development committee in Saptari District in the Sagarmatha Zone of south-eastern Nepal. At the time of the 2011 Nepal census it had a population of 4,849.
