= Tilathi =

Tilathi तिलाठी
- Village development committee
- Location in Nepal
- Coordinates: 26.467655°N 86.766688°E
- Country: Nepal
- Zone: Sagarmatha Zone
- District: Saptari District

Population (1991)
  - Total: 3,960
- Time zone: UTC+5:45 (Nepal Time)

Tilathi is a village development committee in Saptari District in the Sagarmatha Zone of south-eastern Nepal. At the time of the 1991 Nepal census it had a population of 3950 people living in 694 individual households. Tilathi is not only a village, it is also known as the home of intelligent and strongest people. Once upon a time Tilathi was also known as the highest Litrecy rate in nepal.
