= Ramnagar, Saptari =

Ramnagar रामनगर
- Village development committee
- Location in Nepal
- Coordinates: 26.55°N 86.54°E
- Country: Nepal
- Zone: Sagarmatha Zone
- District: Saptari District

Government
  - Type: Local
  - Mayor: Khemchandra Yadav
  - Ward Head: Bindeshwar Yadav

Population (1991)
  - Total: 1,776
- Time zone: UTC+5:45 (Nepal Time)

Ramnagar is a village development committee in Saptari District in the Sagarmatha Zone of south-eastern Nepal. At the time of the 1991 Nepal census it had a population of 1776 people living in 315 individual households.
