= Phakira =

Phakira फकिरा
- Village development committee
- Location in Nepal
- Coordinates: 26.47°N 86.70°E
- Country: Nepal
- Zone: Sagarmatha Zone
- District: Saptari District

Government
- Elevation: 72 m (236 ft)

Population (1991)
  - Total: 3,671
- Time zone: UTC+5:45 (Nepal Time)

Phakira is a village development committee in Saptari District in the Madhesh province of south-eastern Nepal. At the time of the 1991 Nepal census it had a population of 3671 people living in 682 individual households.
