= Koiladi =

Former Village Development Committee in Nepal

Koiladi कोइलाडी
- Village development committee
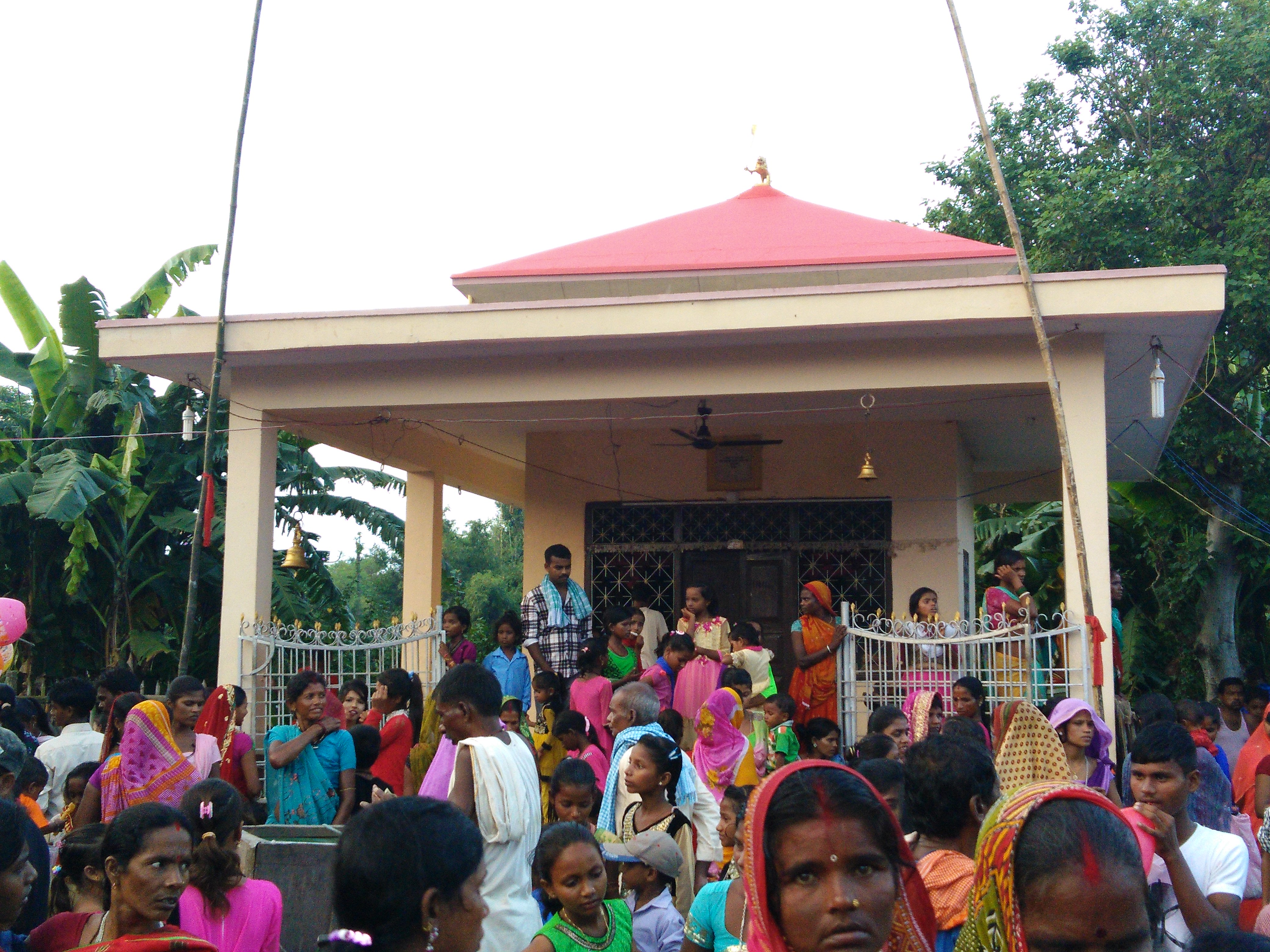
- Koiladi (कोइलाड़ी), 2016
- Nickname: rajput village
- Location in Nepal
- Coordinates: 26.48°N 86.81°E
- Country: Nepal
- Zone: Sagarmatha Zone
- District: Saptari District

Population (2011)
  - Total: 4,723
- Time zone: UTC+5:45 (Nepal Time)
- Postal code: 56407
- Area code: 031

Koiladi is a village development committee in Saptari District in the Sagarmatha Zone of south-eastern Nepal. At the time of the 2011 Nepal census it had a population of 4,723 people living in 874 individual households.
