= Itahari Bishnupur =

Former Village Development Committee in Nepal

Itahari Bishnupur इटहरी विष्णुपुर
- Village development committee
- Location in Nepal
- Coordinates: 26.51°N 86.75°E
- Country: Nepal
- Zone: Sagarmatha Zone
- District: Saptari District

Population (2011)
  - Total: 6,335
- Time zone: UTC+5:45 (Nepal Time)

Itahari Bishnupur is a village development committee in Saptari District in the Sagarmatha Zone of south-eastern Nepal. At the time of the 2011 Nepal census it had a population of 6,335 people living in 1,269 individual households.
