= Pansera =

Village development committee in Sagarmatha Zone, Nepal

Coordinates: 26.66°N 86.59°E

Pansera पनसेरा
- Village development committee
- Interactive map of Pansera
- Country: Nepal
- Zone: Sagarmatha Zone
- District: Saptari District

Population (1991)
  - Total: 3,707
- Time zone: UTC+5:45 (Nepal Time)

Pansera is a village development committee in Saptari District in the Sagarmatha Zone of south-eastern Nepal. At the time of the 1991 Nepal census it had a population of 3707 people living in 709 individual households.
