= Portaha =

Portaha पोर्ताहा
- Village development committee
- Location in Nepal
- Coordinates: 26.57°N 86.89°E
- Country: Nepal
- Zone: Sagarmatha Zone
- District: Saptari District

Population (1991)
  - Total: 4,592
- Time zone: UTC+5:45 (Nepal Time)

Portaha is a former village development committee in Saptari District in the Sagarmatha Zone of south-eastern Nepal. At the time of the 1991 Nepal census it had a population of 4592.
