= Rayapur, Saptari =

Rayapur रायपुर
- Village Development Committee
- Country: Nepal
- Zone: Sagarmatha Zone
- District: Saptari District

Population (1991)
  - Total: 9,573
- Time zone: UTC+5:45 (Nepal Time)

Rayapur is a Village Development Committee in Saptari District in the Sagarmatha Zone of south-eastern Nepal. At the time of the 1991 Nepal census it had a population of 9573.
