= Madhawapur =

Former Village Development Committee in Nepal

Madhawapur मधवापुर
- Village development committee
- Location in Nepal
- Coordinates: 26.56°N 86.87°E
- Country: Nepal
- Zone: Sagarmatha Zone
- District: Saptari District

Population (2011)
  - Total: 5,730
- Time zone: UTC+5:45 (Nepal Time)

Madhawapur is one ward out of 14 ward of hanuman nagar kangkalni municipality in Saptari District in the province no 2 of south-eastern Nepal. It is located 4 km west of koshi barrage.At the time of the 2011 Nepal census it had a population of 5,730 people living in 1,252 individual households.
