= Inarwa, Saptari =

Village development committee in Sagarmatha Zone, Nepal

Coordinates: 26°34′N 86°27′E

Inarwa इनर्वा
- Village development committee
- Interactive map of Inarwa
- Country: Nepal
- Zone: Sagarmatha Zone
- District: Saptari District

Population (1991)
  - Total: 2,582
- Time zone: UTC+5:45 (Nepal Time)

Inarwa is a village development committee in Saptari District in the Sagarmatha Zone of south-eastern Nepal. At the time of the 1991 Nepal census it had a population of 2582 people living in 416 individual households.
