= Kushaha =

Kushaha कुशाहा
- Village development committee
- Location in Nepal
- Coordinates: 26.69°N 86.56°E
- Country: Nepal
- Zone: Sagarmatha Zone
- District: Saptari District

Population (2011)
  - Total: 6,695
- Time zone: UTC+5:45 (Nepal Time)

Kushaha is a village development committee in Saptari District in the Sagarmatha Zone of south-eastern Nepal. The 2011 Nepal census records a population of 6,695 people living in 1,253 individual households.
