= Joginiya-2 =

Former Village Development Committee in Nepal

Joginiya-2, Now Hanumannagar Yognimai municipality जोगिनिया २
- Village development committee
- Location in Nepal
- Coordinates: 26.53°N 86.86°E
- Country: Nepal
- Zone: Sagarmatha Zone
- District: Saptari District

Population (1991)
  - Total: 3,248
- Time zone: UTC+5:45 (Nepal Time)

Joginiya-2 is a village development committee in Saptari District in the Sagarmatha Zone of south-eastern Nepal. At the time of the 1991 Nepal census it had a population of 3248 people living in 550 individual households.
