= Siswa Beihi =

Siswa belhi saharwa4 सिसवा बेल्ही saharwa
- Village development committee
- Motto: it follows the way from kharchuiya to the south at about 5 km distance
- Location in Nepal
- Coordinates: 26.62°N 86.57°E
- Country: Nepal
- Zone: Sagarmatha Zone
- District: Saptari District

Population (1991)
  - Total: 7,000
- Time zone: UTC+5:45 (Nepal Time)
- Postal code: 56400

Siswa Beihi is a village development committee in Saptari District in the Sagarmatha Zone of south-eastern Nepal. At the time of the 1991 Nepal census it had a population of 4707 people living in 1061 individual households.
