= Rajgadh Rural Municipality =

Rajgdah राजगढ़
- Rural Municipality (Gaunpalika)
- Location in Nepal
- Coordinates: 26.52°N 86.65°E
- Country: Nepal
- Zone: Sagarmatha Zone
- District: Saptari District
- Established: 2073

Population (2017)
  - Total: 29,459
- Time zone: UTC+5:45 (Nepal Time)
- Postal code: 56409
- Area code: 031
- Website: https://rajgadhmun.gov.np/

Rajgadh is a rural municipality in Saptari District in the Sagarmatha Zone of south-eastern Nepal. At the time of the 2021 Nepal census it had a population of 32,975 people living in 5,687 individual households.
