= Pipra (Purba) =

Coordinates: 26°39′N 86°56′E

Pipra (Purba) पिपरा पूर्व
- Interactive map of Pipra (Purba)
- Country: Nepal
- Zone: Sagarmatha Zone
- District: Saptari District

Population (1991)
  - Total: 2,746
- Time zone: UTC+5:45 (Nepal Time)

Pipra (Purba) is a village and market center in Kanchan Roop Municipality in Saptari District in the Sagarmatha Zone of south-eastern Nepal. It was merged in the municipality along with other 8 Villages since 18 May 2013. At the time of the 1991 Nepal census it had a population of 2746 people living in 509 individual households.
