= Gobargada =

Gobargada गोवरगाढा
- Village development committee
- Interactive map of Gobargada
- Coordinates: 26.30°N 86.54°E
- Country: Nepal
- Zone: Sagarmatha Zone
- District: Saptari District

Population (1991)
  - Total: 1,651
- Time zone: UTC+5:45 (Nepal Time)

Gobargada is a village development committee in Saptari District in the Sagarmatha Zone of south-eastern Nepal. At the time of the 1991 Nepal census it had a population of 1651 people living in 323 individual households.
