= Hardiya, Saptari =

Former Village Development Committee in Nepal

Hardiya हर्दिया
- Village development committee
- Location in Nepal
- Coordinates: 26.76°N 86.54°E
- Country: Nepal
- Zone: Sagarmatha Zone
- District: Saptari District

Population (2011)
  - Total: 5,286
- Time zone: UTC+5:45 (Nepal Time)

Hardiya is a village development committee in Saptari District in the Sagarmatha Zone of south-eastern Nepal. At the time of the 2011 Nepal census it had a population of 5,286 people living in 1,139 individual households.

Hardiya, according to Nepal's statistics falls in Ward Number 6 and has people of different casts including mukhiya, saha, yadav, chaudhari etc.

== Inhabitants ==
1. Mukhiya (Malah)
2. Chaudhari (Tharu)
3. Sah (Teli)
4. Yadav (Guwar)
5. Chamar (RAM)
6. Mandal (Khatbe)

== Languages spoken ==
Most of the people in Hardiya speaks Maithili. However, there are other languages that are well practices among people including Hindi, Nepali, English and Bhojpuri.

== Festivals ==
People follow most of the festivals celebrated in Nepal. Some of the important festivals are Dashan, Tihar, Chhat, Shivaratri, etc.

== Cultural heritages ==
Hardiya preserves some of the important heritages of Nepal. Most of these heritages are protected by local communities. Some of the important one are listed below:

1. kamlasthan
2. rajajisthan
3. dinabhadristhan
