= Kamalpur, Nepal =

Village development committee in Sagarmatha Zone, Nepal

Kamalpur कमलपुर
- Village development committee
- Location in Nepal
- Coordinates: 26.69°N 86.91°E
- Country: Nepal
- Zone: Sagarmatha Zone
- District: Saptari District

Population (2011)
  - Total: 5,334
- Time zone: UTC+5:45 (Nepal Time)

Kamalpur is a saptakoshi 9 municipality in Saptari District in the Sagarmatha Zone of south-eastern Nepal. At the time of the 2011 Nepal census it had a population of 5,334 people living in 1,038 individual households.
