= Saptari District =

District in Madhesh Pradesh, Nepal

Coordinates: 26°35′N 86°45′E

Saptari District सप्तरी जिल्ला
- District
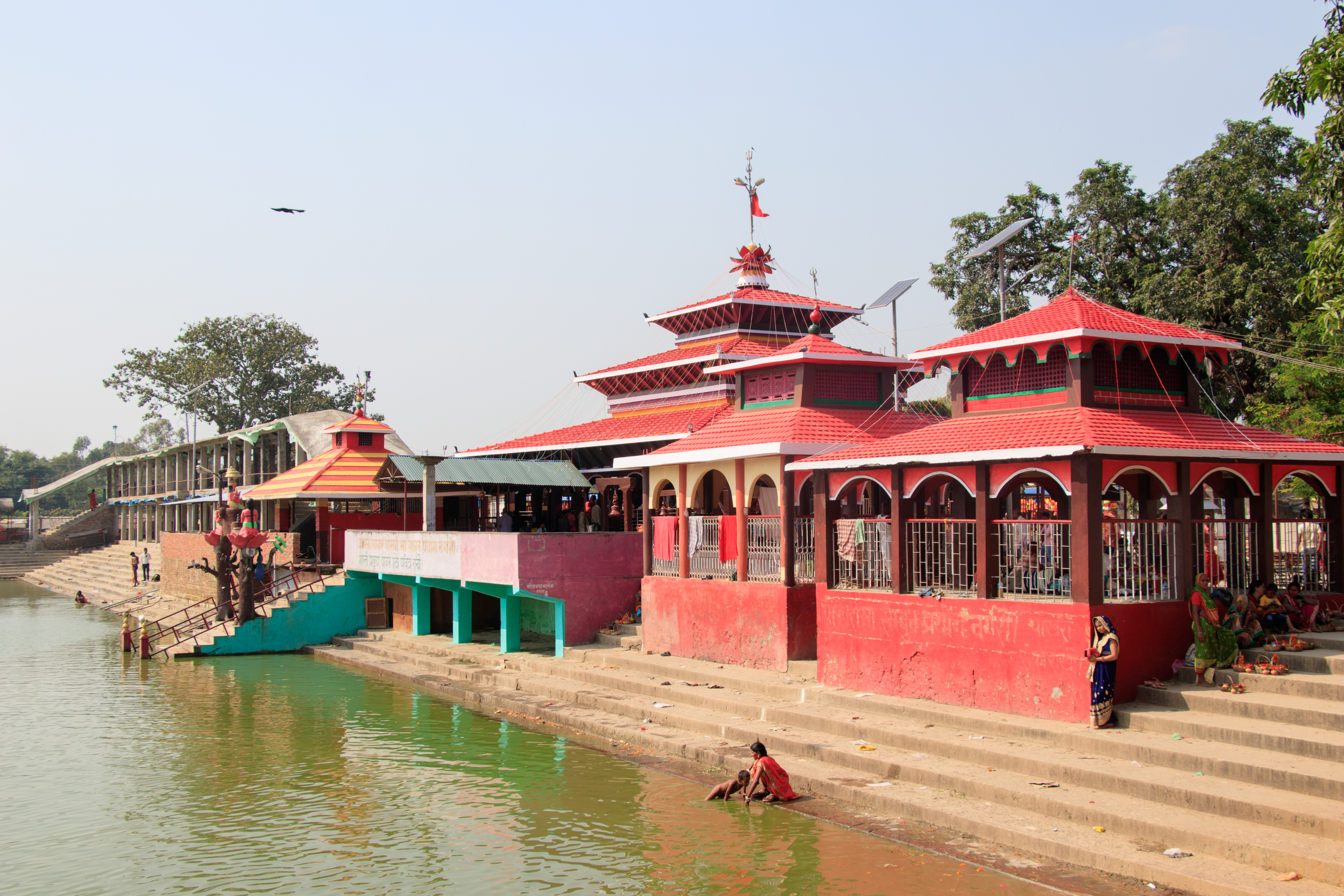
- Chinnamasta Temple

- Saptari District (dark yellow) in Madhesh Province
- Country: Nepal
- Region: Mithila
- Province: Madhesh
- Admin HQ.: Rajbiraj

Government
  - Type: District Coordination Committee
  - Body: DCC, Saptari
  - Parliamentary constituencies: 4
  - Provincial constituencies: 8

Area
  - Total: 1,363 km^{2} (526 sq mi)

Population (2021)
  - Total: 706,255
  - Density: 518.2/km^{2} (1,342/sq mi)
- Time zone: UTC+05:45 (NPT)
- Telephone Code: 031
- Main Language: Maithili, Nepali
- Website: www.ddcsaptari.gov.np

Saptari (Maithili: सप्तरी जिल्ला) is located in the easternmost part of Madhesh Province, is one of the seventy-seven districts of Nepal. Saptari is an outer Terai district, and its headquarters is Rajbiraj. This district covers an area of 1,363 km^{2} (526 sq mi) and a population of 706,255 according to the 2021 Nepal census, which makes it the 14th most populous district of Nepal. Saptari is renowned for its agricultural output and is bordered on the east by the massive Koshi River, on the west by the Balan River separating Siraha district, on the north by Udayapur district, and on the south by Supaul district and Madhubani district of Bihar, India.

Saptari district is located in 68m above sea level at an elevation of 457 meters, it extends to 26.22 minutes north latitude and 86.45 minutes east longitude. The east-west length of the district covers 63% of the plains of the Terai and 37% of the chure region and the north-south width is an average of 23 km.

Map

There are nine municipalities in Saptari: Dakneshwori, Rajbiraj, Bodebarsain, Hanumannagar Kankalini, Kanchanrup, Saptakoshi, surunga, Shambhunath and Khadak. Other small towns include Mahuli, Kathauna Fattepur, Pato and Itahari Bishnupur with the area government "Machha Palan Kendra" fish farming centre.

The famous Chhinnamasta temple is one of the Shakti Peeths and Kankalini Temple are also located in Saptari District. Saptari has highest growth in Maithili literature.

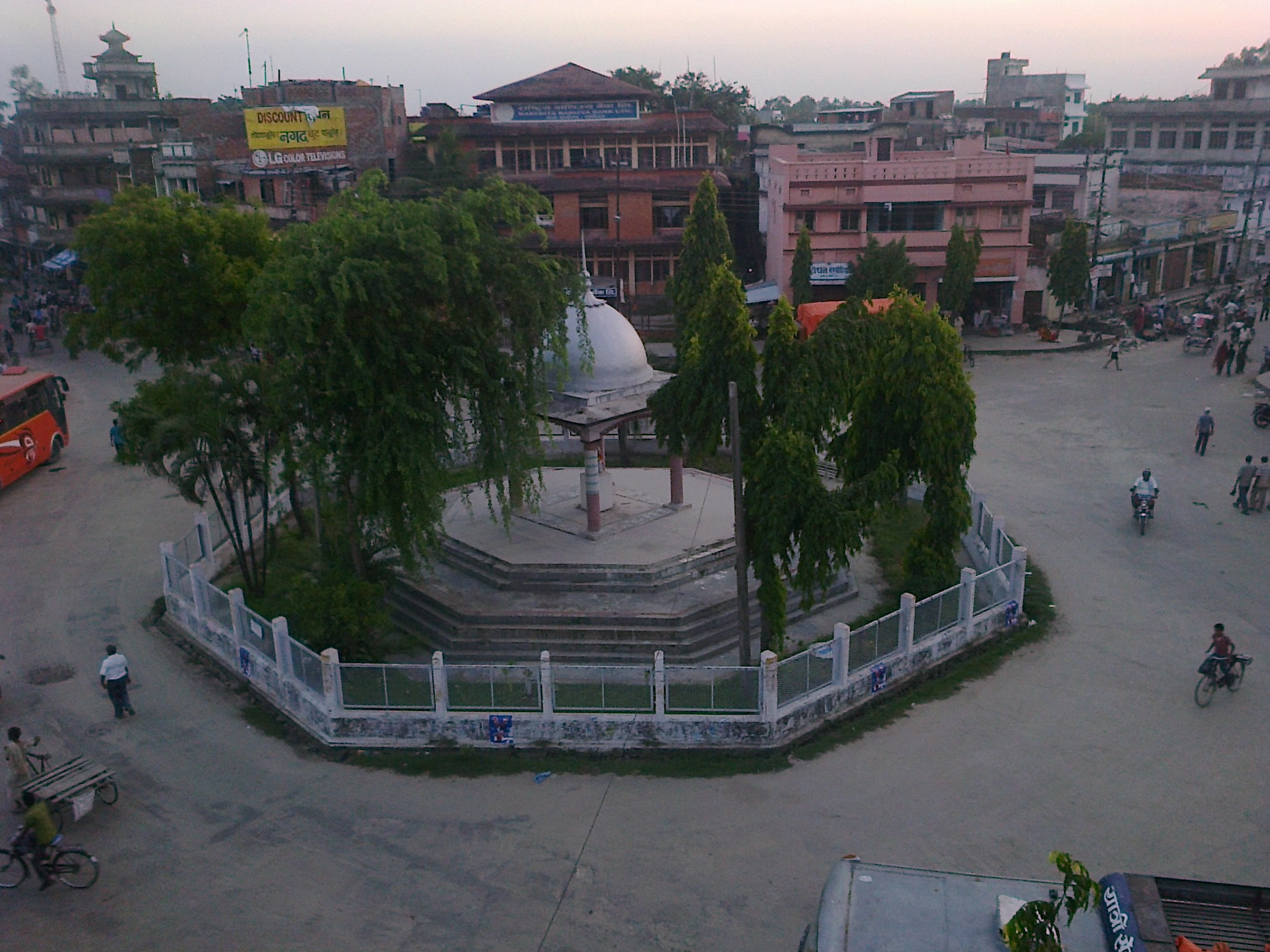
Tribhuvan Chok (now Gajendra Chok) situated in the centre of Rajbiraj

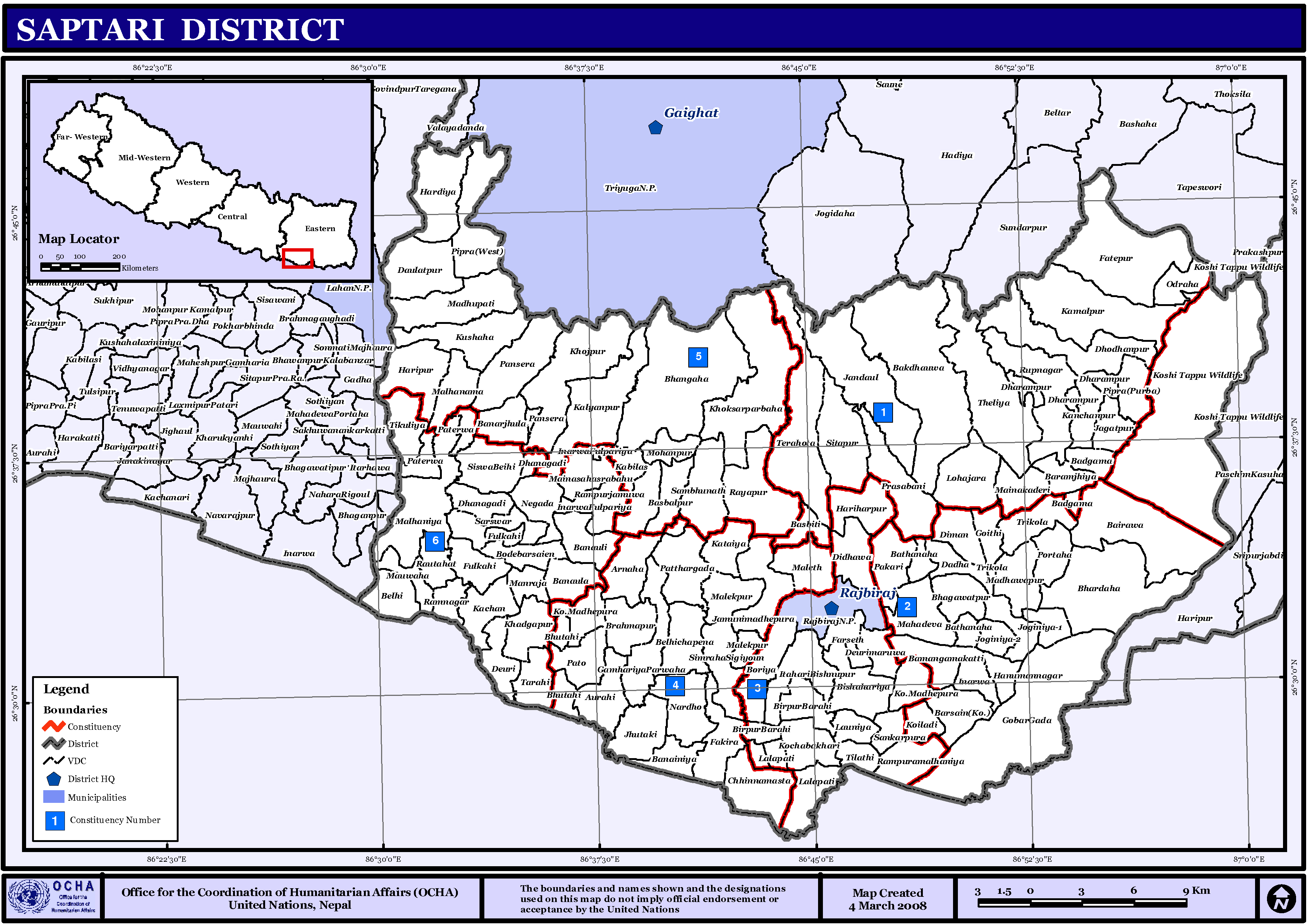
VDCs and Municipalities (blue) in Saptari District

== Temples ==
=== Chinnamasta Bhagawati ===
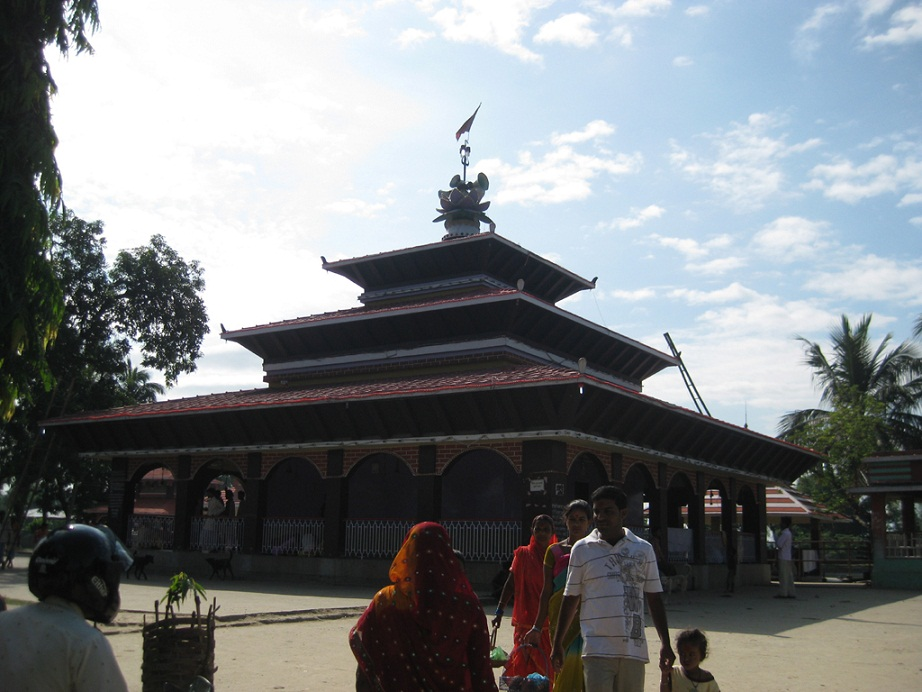
Chinnamasta Bhagwati, Sakhda

Chinnamasta Bhagawati (छिन्नमस्ता भगवती) is a temple of Eastern Nepal. It is situated in Chinnamasta VDC, Saptari, 10 km (6.2 mi) from Rajbiraj and also near to Indian Border. It is a main attraction for Indian pilgrims. People are likely to come here in Bada Dashain. Some thousands of goats are sacrificed here during dashain.

=== Shambhunath ===
Shambhunath (शम्भुनाथ) is another one of the famous temples of Eastern Nepal. It is situated in Shambhunath, 12 km (7.5 mi) from Rajbiraj and also near Mahendra Highway. This temple is a main attraction for Indian pilgrims. People are likely to come here in Siruwa Mela during month of Baisakh (the first month of Bikram Sambat).

=== Kankalini Temple ===
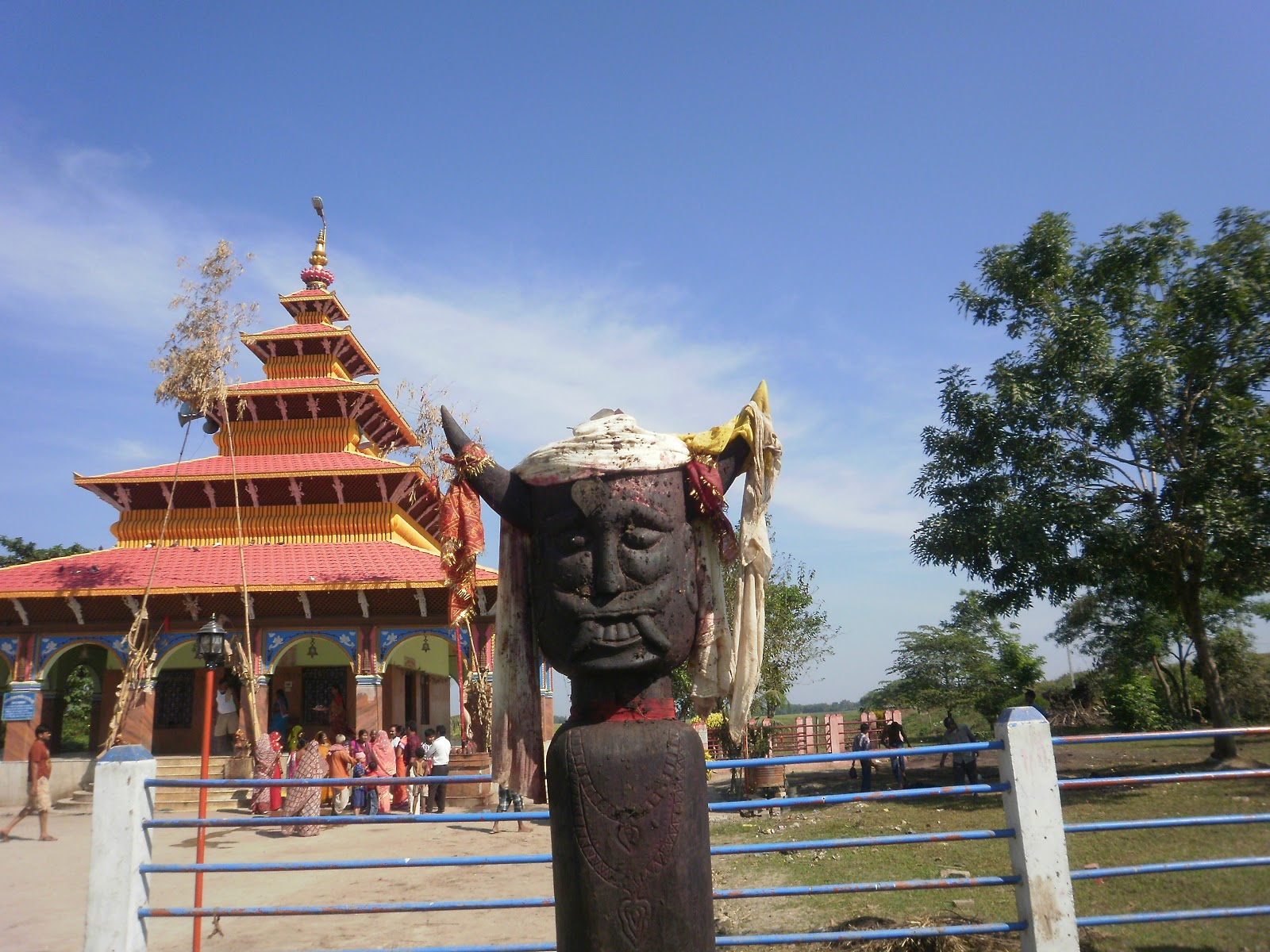
Kankalini Temple

Kankalini Temple (कंकालिनी) is another temple situated in this district; it is located in Bhardah-1 of Hanumannagar Kankalini Municipality. This temple is main attraction for Indian pilgrims. Kankalini Temple has great religious importance. Like most of the other Shakti Peethas in Nepal, this temple, too, has a legend attached to it. According to the legend, the people settled in Bhardaha village had started to use the land for farming, however, while digging, some farmers had found a stone statue carved beautifully with the image of Goddess Durga and in that very place, this temple is said to have been built. It is believed that when a devotee worships with great devotion and true heart in the temple, their wish comes true. So, thousands of peoples from many part of the country come to this temple to worship the avatar of Goddess Durga, known famously as goddess Kankalini.

== Geography and climate ==
Climate Zone	Elevation Range	% of Area
Lower Tropical	below 300 m (980 ft)	94.7%
Upper Tropical	300 to 1,000 m (980 to 3,280 ft)	2.3%

== Education ==
- Mahendra Bindeshwari Multiple Campus- TU Affiliated Public Campus located in Rajbiraj offering LLB, BBS, BA, MBS, M.Ed.
- National People College- TU Affiliated Private College established in 2013 AD Offers Masters and Bachelors level of Programs in Management and Humanities Faculties. It is the 1st Private College of Saptari District Offering the Subjects of Study like MA-SOCIOLOGY, MBS, BA-RD and SOCIOLOGY. The college is Ultramodern and is Located in Kanchanrup Munacipality.

HSEB affiliated +2 colleges are:

- Happyland HSS and college
- Laligurans EBHSS or Paradise Campus
- Caliber International College
- Mission College
- Kshitiz Edu. Foundation
- Chinnamasta College
- Annapurna Multiple College, Kanchanpur Beriyar, Saptari - just the east of UTL Tower
- Rajbiraj Model Campus

== Demographics ==
Historical population
Census year	Pop.	±% p.a.
1981		—
1991		—
2001		—
2011	639,284	—
2021	706,255	+1.00%
Source: Citypopulation

At the time of the 2021 Nepal census, Saptari District had a population of 706,255. 9.47% of the population is under 5 years of age. It has a literacy rate of 67.69% and a sex ratio of 1010 females per 1000 males. 441,203 (62.47%) lived in municipalities.

Ethnic groups in Saptari district (2021)
1. Yadav (15.8%)
2. Tharu (11.2%)
3. Muslim (9.53%)
4. Teli (7.48%)
5. Dhanuk (7.22%)
6. Musahar (6.60%)
7. Khatwe (6.34%)
8. Chamar (4.63%)
9. Mallah (2.58%)
10. Bantar (2.30%)
11. Rajdhob (1.91%)
12. Amat (1.78%)
13. Other Madheshi non-Dalit (14.1%)
14. Other Madheshi Dalit (3.62%)
15. Khas (2.19%)
16. Hill Janjati (1.28%)
17. Others (1.49%)

Madheshis are the largest group, of which a third are Dalits. Tharus are the second-largest group, and here make up the largest fraction of the population of any district in Madhesh. Muslims are nearly 10% of the population. A very small proportion are Hill Janjatis or Khas people.

Languages of Saptari district (2021)
1. Maithili (80.5%)
2. Tharu (11.6%)
3. Nepali (3.37%)
4. Urdu (3.17%)
5. Others (1.31%)

Maithili is the largest language. Tharu is the second-largest language. Urdu and Nepali are spoken by a small minority.

Religion in Saptari district (2021)
Religion	Percent
Hinduism	88.47%
Islam	9.60%
Buddhism	1.72%
Other or not stated	0.21%

Religion: 88.47% of the population was Hindu, 9.60% Muslim and 1.72% Buddhist.

== Administration ==
The district consists of eighteen municipalities, out of which nine are urban municipalities and nine are rural municipalities. These are as follows:

- Bodebarsain Municipality
- Dakneshwori Municipality
- Hanumannagar Kankalini Municipality
- Kanchanrup Municipality
- Khadak Municipality
- Sambhunath Municipality
- Saptakoshi Municipality
- Surunga Municipality
- Rajbiraj Municipality
- Agnisaira Krishnasavaran Rural Municipality
- Balan-Bihul Rural Municipality
- Rajgadh Rural Municipality
- Bishnupur Rural Municipality
- Chhinnamasta Rural Municipality
- Mahadeva Rural Municipality
- Rupani Rural Municipality
- Tilathi Koiladi Rural Municipality
- Tirhut Rural Municipality

=== Former Village Development Committees (VDCs) and Municipalities ===
- Arnaha
- Aurahi, now Dakneshwori Municipality ward No. 6
- Babhangama katti
- Badgama, Vagni maleth
- Bainiya
- Bairawa, now Kanchanrup Municipality ward no. 1
- Bakdhauwa
- Banarjhula
- Banaula, now Dakneshwori Municipality ward No. 10
- Banauli
- Baramjhiya, now Kanchan Rup Mun.
- Barhmapur
- Barsain
- Basbiti
- Bathnaha
- Belhi now Khadk Mun ward No 2
- Belhi Chapena
- Bhagawatpur
- Bhardaha, now Hanumannagar Kankalini Mun.
- Bhutahi, now Dakneshwori Municipality ward No. 4
- Birpur Barahi
- Bishariya-Bhelhi
- Bodebarsain Municipality
- Boriya
- Brahamapur, now Dakneshwori Municipality ward No. 7
- Chhinnamasta
- Dakneshwori Municipality
- Dauda
- Daulatpur, Now surunga Mun Wada No 3
- Deuri
- Deurimaruwa
- Dhanagadi
- Babhangam katti
- Dharampur, now Kanchan Rup Mun.
- Dhodhanpur, now Kanchan Rup Mun.
- Didhawa
- Diman
- Gamhariya Parwaha
- Gobargada, now Hanumannagar Kankalini Mun.
- Goithi
- Hanumannagar, now Municipality
- Hanumannagar Kankalini Municipality
- Hardiya Now surunga Mun Wada No 2
- Hariharpur
- Haripur Now surunga Mun wada No 7
- Inarwa, now Hanumannagar Kankalini Mun.
- Inarwa Phulbariya
- Itahari Bishnupur
- Jagatpur, now Kanchan Rup Mun.
- Jamuni Madhapura
- Jandaul
- Jhutaki
- Joginiya-1, now Hanumannagar Kankalini Mun.
- Joginiya-2, now Hanumannagar Kankalini Mun.
- Kabilasha, now Dakneshwori Municipality ward No. 1
- Kachan
- Kanchan Rup Municipality
- Kalyanpur Khadk Mun 6, 7, 8
- Kamalpur, now Saptaskoshi Mun.
- Kanchanpur
- Kataiya, Now Rupani Gaunpalika
- Kathauna
- Khadgapur, included in Bodebarsain Mun.
- Khojpur Now Khadk Mun 5
- Ko. Madhepura
- Kochabakhari
- Koiladi
- Kushaha
- Lalapati
- Launiya
- Lohajara
- Madhawapur, now Hanumannagar Kankalini Mun.
- Madhupati now surunga mun Wada no 4
- Mahadeva
- Maina Kaderi
- Maina Sahasrabahu
- Malekpur
- Maleth
- Malhanama
- Malhaniya, now Hanumannagar Kankalini Mun.
- Manraja, included in Bodebarsain Mun.
- Mauwaha
- Mohanpur
- Nargho
- Negada
- Odraha
- Pakari
- Pansera
- Jandaul
- Parasbani
- Paterwa
- Pato, now Dakneshwori Municipality ward No. 5
- Patthargada, now Dakneshwori Municipality ward No. 9
- Phakira
- Pharseth
- Phattepur, now Saptakoshi Mun.
- Phulkahi
- (Parwaha)
- Pipra (Purba), now Kanchan Rup Mun.
- Pipra (West) surunga mun wada No 1
- Portaha, now Hanumannagar Kankalini Mun.
- Rajbiraj Municipality
- Rajgadh Rural Municipality
- Ramnagar
- Rampur Jamuwa
- Rampur Malhaniya, now Hanumannagar Kankalini Mun.
- Rautahat
- Rayapur
- Rupnagar, now Kanchan Rup Mun.
- Shambhunath Municipality
- Sankarpura
- Saptakoshi Municipality
- Sarashwar
- Simraha Sigiyaun
- Siswa Beihi now khadak Mun Wada No 1,2
- Sitapur
- Tarahi, now Dakneshwori Municipality ward No. 3
- Terahota
- Theliya, now Kancha
- Tilathi
- Trikola
- Kankatta now Bishnupur Rular Municipality Wada no.4
- Hatti Now Chhinnamasta Rular Municipality Wada no. 7

== Notable persons ==
- Mehboob Alam, cricketer who was the first bowler to take all ten wickets in an innings in an ICC recognized international tournament match.
- Teju Lal Chaudhary, Nepali Congress politician and member of House of Representatives
- Parmanand Jha, first Vice President of Nepal and ex Supreme Court Judge
- Udit Narayan : Famous Bollywood and Nepali singer from Bhardaha, Saptari
- C. K. Raut, politician, computer scientist and founder of Janamat Party
- Gajendra Narayan Singh, founder of Nepal Sadbhawana Party
- Ram Raja Prasad Singh, politician
- Satish Kumar Singh, politician, the current Chief Minister of Madhesh Pradesh
- Ranju Yadav, artist

== See also ==
- Chandra Nahar Canal
- Zones of Nepal
- Gajendra Chowk
