= Happyland Higher Secondary School =

Location
- Rajbiraj-4; Sagarmatha; Nepal
- Coordinates: 26.3225°N 86.4445°E

Information
- Type: Boarding School; Higher Secondary Education Board (10+2)
- Motto: Abide in Truth
- Established: 1980 AD
- School district: Saptari
- Principal: Mr.Bijyanand jha
- Enrollment: 1700 (approximately)
- Color: Navy Blue
- Affiliations: School Leaving Certificate (Grade 10)
- Information: Happyland higher secondary school is one of the reputated and well managed school in Rajbiraj.It was established on 2036 B.S.

Happyland Higher Secondary School (HHSS) is a boarding school in Rajbiraj, Nepal. The school was established in 1979. The founder of the school is Punya Sitaula. It is the second private school established in Rajbiraj Municipality. The school has around 1700 students.

== Academics ==
There are two courses of study in HHSS:

- School Leaving Certificate (SLC) (a nationwide curriculum up to class 10 prescribed by the Department of Education of Nepal) and
- 10+2 Level (Higher Secondary Education Board of Nepal, equivalent alternative to A-Level).

== See also ==
- List of educational institutions in Rajbiraj
