= Premier Secondary Boarding School =

Boarding school in Rajbiraj, Sagarmatha, Nepal

Premier Secondary School

Location
- Rajbiraj-8; Sagarmatha; Nepal; 26.3224°N 86.4441°E

Information
- Type: Boarding School
- Motto: Giving Quality Education
- Established: 1998
- School district: Saptari
- Authorizer: Mr. Rajesh Karn
- Superintendent: Rajesh Karn
- Principal: Dr. K. Shankar
- Headmaster: Dr. Rajesh Karn
- Head teacher: Devendra Mohan Lal Das
- Staff: 30
- Enrollment: 400+ (approximately)
- Color: Navy Blue
- Song: 'Nepal is my country'
- Nickname: P.S.S.
- Affiliations: School Leaving Certificate (Grade 10)

Premier Secondary Boarding School (Nepali: प्रिमियर माध्यमिक विधालय) is a boarding school in Rajbiraj, Nepal. The school was established in 1998. The founder of the school is Rajesh Karna. The school has around 500 students. It is one of the school who produces reasonable percentage of results in School Leaving Certificate exams. Abhishek Shrivastav from the school topped Saptari district in SLC 2072 BS and get awarded by PABSON ( Private & Boarding Schools' Organization Nepal). The school provides qualitative education to all the studying students.

The school offers education in English medium with Nepali taught as vernaculars. Other subjects are taught as per the norms of the Department of Education in Nepal.

== Education ==
There are currently classes from Junior level Nursery to Grade 10 in Premier Secondary School:

- School Leaving Certificate (SLC but now SEE> Secondary Education Examination (Nepal)) (a nationwide curriculum up to class 10 prescribed by the Department of Education of Nepal under Office of Controller of Examinations, Sanothimi, Bhaktapur).

== Infrastructure ==
The school has a built-up area of about 9,100 square feet (850 m^{2}). The building is two-storeyed, and there is a computer lab. The playground is big enough to host all minor sports.

== See also ==
- List of educational institutions in Rajbiraj
