= Gajendra Chowk =

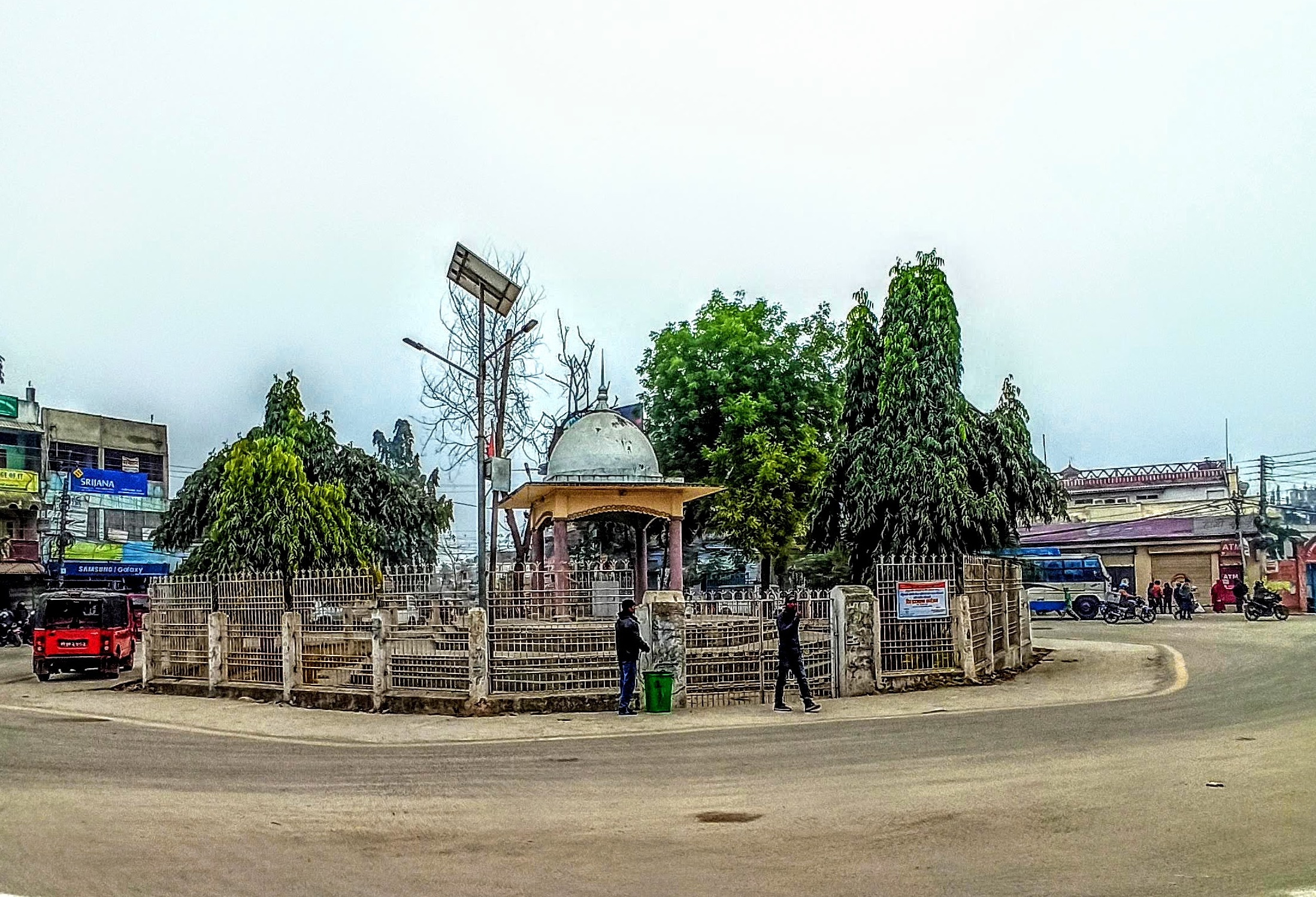
- Gajendra Chowk
- Interactive map of Gajendra Chowk
- Native name: गजेन्द्र चौक (Nepali)
- Former names: Tribhuvan Chowk, Gol Chowk
- Addresses: Rajbiraj-7, Rajbiraj Road
- Location: Rajbiraj, Saptari, Nepal
- Postal code: 56400
- Coordinates: 26.539581°N 86.748538°E

Construction
- Construction start: December 27, 1956
- Inauguration: March 11, 1960

Other
- Status: pedestrianised

Gajendra Chowk (formerly Tribhuvan Chowk and Gol Bazar Chowk) is a four-way town square, historical landmark and the busiest commercial and business center in the town of Rajbiraj. The township of Rajbiraj was systematically designed in 1938 during Rana regime. The initial grid design town planning consisted of Gol Bazar Chowk (transl. Round Market Chowk), which connects the neighbourhood from each direction and worked as a roundabout.

Until 2007, the square hosted a statue of the then king, Tribhuvan Shah, and was known as Tribhuvan Chowk (lit. 'Tribhuvan Square'). The statue of Tribhuvan was vandalised during the Madhesh movement in 2007. A statue of Gajendra Narayan Singh was installed in the centre of the chowk, and it was officially renamed Gajendra Chowk.

On all sides, the chowk is lined with public commercial banks, more than a hundred retail shops, stalls, vendors, and historic residential buildings. The National Highway 14 passes through this chowk and ends at Rampur Malhaniya near the Indo-Nepal border.

== History ==
On December 27, 1956, the then king Mahendra Shah laid the foundation stone at Gol Bazar Chowk to build a square structure with a statue of Tribhuvan in the centre.A local marwari businessman, Yashkaran Chaudaria, donated the statue of Tribhuvan, which he brought from Rajasthan, India. (Note: Saptari Darpan is a historic book written by Muktinath Mandal in 1999.)

After the completion of the structure, Mahendra visited again on March 11, 1960, to inaugurate the Gol Bazar Chowk and during his speech, he thanked the public of Rajbiraj and expressed heartfelt gratitude to Yashkaran Chauradia.

The square was renamed as Gajendra Chowk after the first Madhesh Movement in 2007.

== Location ==
The chowk is a junction of four different pathways and is surrounded by historical buildings, which were built from 1945 to 1950 CE. The eastern side connects to the branch office of Laxmi Sunrise Bank, shopping stores, Saptari Chambers of Commerce and Industry, and the fish market. The western side leads to several jewellery stores, pharmacies, clothes shops, branch offices of commercial banks, the Janakpur High Court (Rajbiraj Bench), and the Saptari District Court. The northern side of the chowk is connected to the branch office of Nepal Bank Limited, various fruit stores and Mahabir Chowk. The southern and last part leads to mobile stores, hardware stores, and Dashan Chowk. The chowk is a common location for religious and political rallies.

== Gallery ==
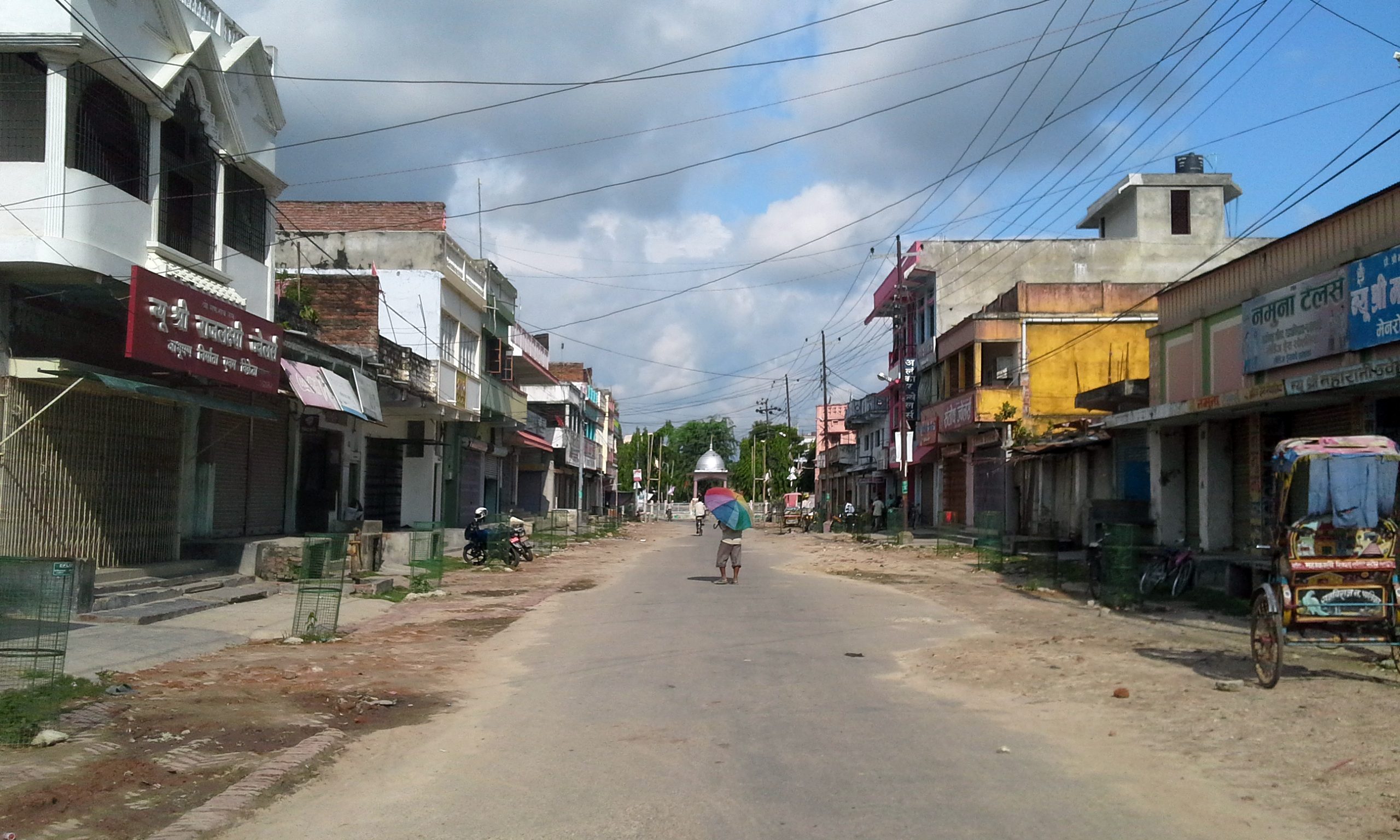
The chowk seen from the western side alley.

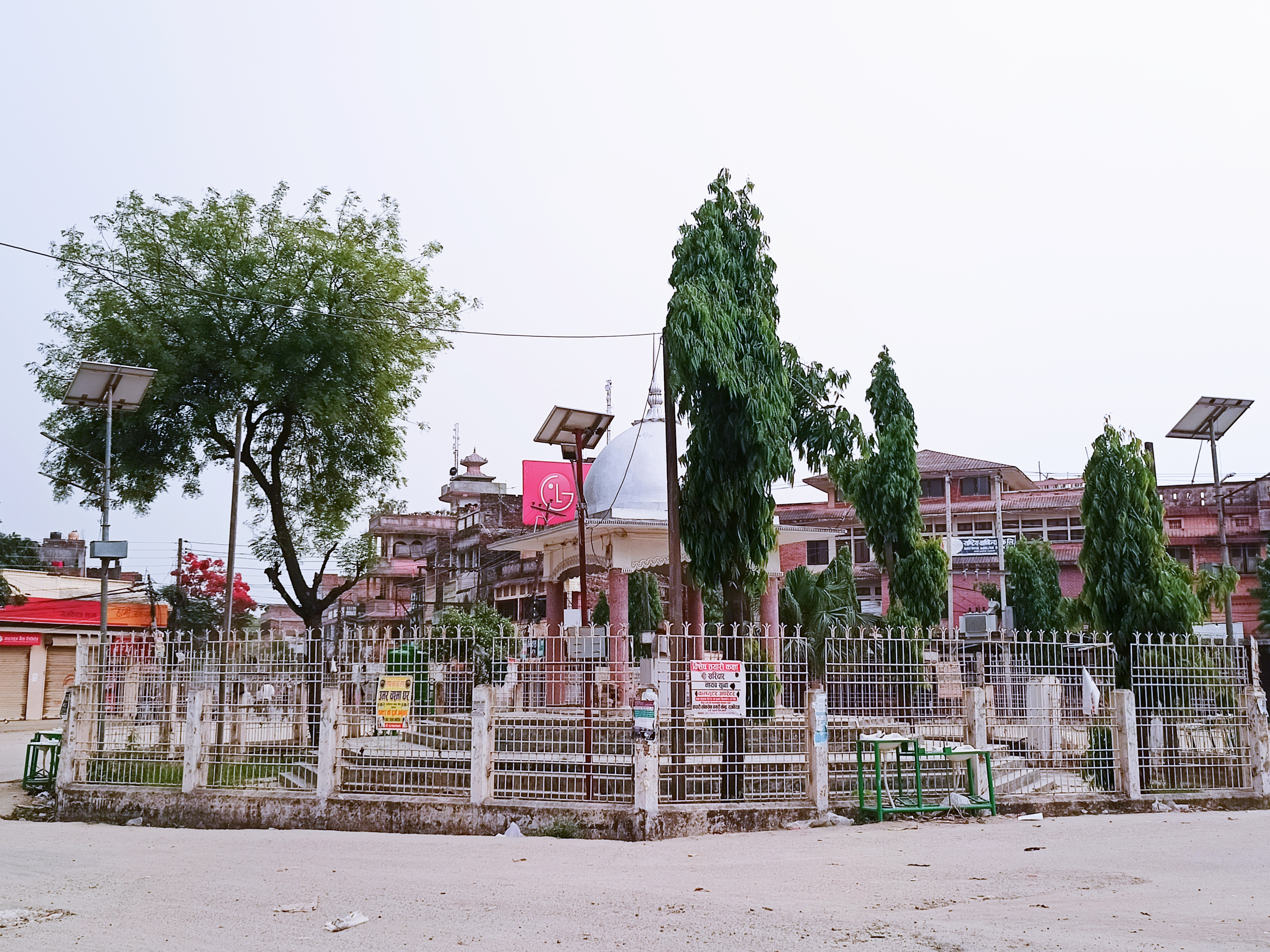
The close view of the roundabout structure at the chowk.
