= Rajbiraj Model Higher Secondary School =

Rajbiraj Model Campus

Location
- Kharshaal tole, Rajbiraj-7; Sagarmatha, 2 Nepal; 26.3220°N 86.4430°E

Information
- Type: Higher Secondary Education Board (10+2); Bachelor
- Established: 2001; 25 years ago
- Principal: Ramakant Yadav
- Staff: 8
- Faculty: 20
- Enrollment: Approx. 1000
- Nickname: RMC
- Affiliations: Higher Secondary Education Board; Tribhuvan University

Rajbiraj Model Higher Secondary School (RMHS) or Rajbiraj Model Campus is an educational institution in Rajbiraj, Nepal. The college is established in 2001. The college is affiliated by Higher Secondary Education Board (HSEB), Nepal for 10+2 course and Tribhuvan University for Bachelor and Masters level courses. It is the oldest private college established in Rajbiraj Municipality. The school has around 1000 students. It is situated in heart of Rajbiraj Municipality.

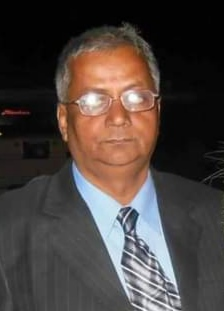

Principle

== Academics ==
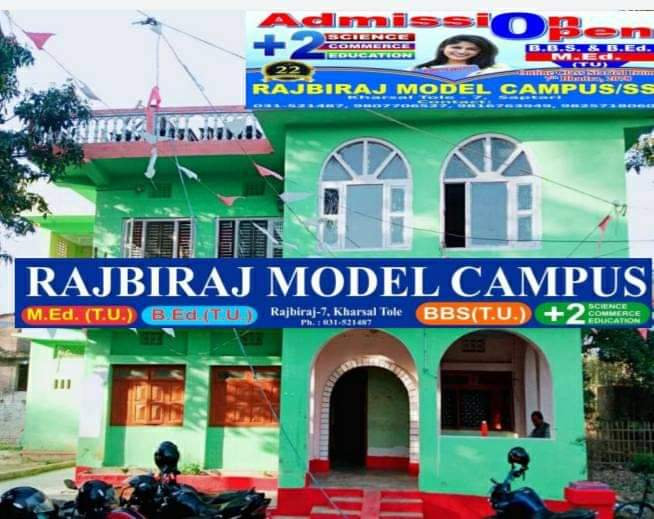
Administrative Building

There ere three courses of study in Rajbiraj Model Campus:

- 10+2 Level Higher Secondary Education Board of Nepal, equivalent alternative to A-Level.
- Bachelor (Tribhuvan University)
- Masters（T.U）

== See also ==
- List of educational institutions in Rajbiraj
