= Hanuman Nagar =

Hanuman Nagar may refer to:

- Hanuman Nagar, Saptari, Nepal
- Hanuman Nagar, Siraha, Nepal
