= Sai Krishna Medical College & Hospital =

Private medical college in Nepal

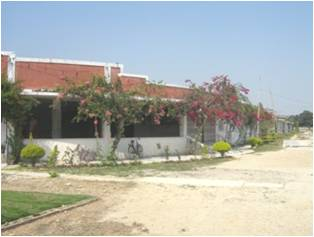
- Type: Private Medical College
- Established: 2004
- Affiliations: Tribhuvan University
- President: Sai Krishna Foundation for Health and Medical Sciences (P) Ltd.
- Location: Rajbiraj, Nepal; 26.541328°N 86.756034°E
- Nickname: SKMCH
- Website: www.educationinfoindia.com/saikrishna
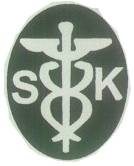

Sai Krishna Medical College & Hospital (SKMCH) is a private medical college based in Rajbiraj, Nepal. The institute was established in 2004 and operates autonomously under the Tribhuvan University. It is promoted by the Sai Krishna Foundation for Health and Medical Sciences (P) Ltd.. The governing Body of SKMCH is the Medical Council of Nepal, and the Governing Ministry is the Ministry of Education & Sports of Nepal.

== Location ==
Sai Krishna Medical College & Hospital is located in Rajbiraj, Saptari, Nepal. It has a 300-bed hospital at Rajbiraj and will also be seeking the Sagarmatha Hospital/Government Hospital as its teaching hospital to enable the students to have more practice and observation skills. SKMCH has acquired 16 bighas of land in Rupni, Saptari district area and proposes to construct a 700-bed multi specialty fully automated hospital one of its kind in the region.

Rajbiraj being the only modern days planned town of Nepal-was established in 1942 AD, simulating the “Prastara “planning concept of the Pink City of Jaipur. Population based on Census 2001 is 30,353. Rajbiraj has long been considered an environmentally most suitable place for dwelling purposes. A research study conducted by TU/IOE has found Rajbiraj to be most suitable for Regional Level educational establishment/ training centers.

Establishment of medical college or training institutes for health workers will highly facilitate the poor patients of Saptari, Siraha and Udaypur Districts – who at present go to Dharan, Biratnagar, Kathmandu and Darbhanga (India) for medical treatment. The all around development of Rajbiraj is contingent on the improvements in transport linkage to Indian border towns or railroad head points. Upgrading of existing road networks (such as Hulaki road) to year-round accessibility status is also highly demanded.

== See also ==
- List of educational institutions in Rajbiraj
