= Unique College of Medical Science and Hospital =

- युनिक कलेज अफ मेडिकल साइन्स एन्ड हस्पिटल
- Type: Health university
- Established: 2001 January
- Affiliations: CTEVT
- Chairman: Jay Prakash Thakur
- Academic staff: 8
- Administrative staff: 70
- Students: 1600
- Location: Rajbiraj-7, Saptari, Nepal, Rajbiraj, Saptari, Nepal; 26.599195°N 86.722810°E
- Website: www.uea.edu.np

Unique College of Medical Science and Hospital (UCOMS) (Nepali: युनिक कलेज अफ मेडिकल साइन्स एन्ड हस्पिटल), is a medical institution in Rajbiraj, Nepal. It was established in January 2001 in an eastern city of Nepal Rajbiraj. The governing Body of UCOMS is the Medical Council of Nepal, and the Governing Ministry is the Ministry of Education & Sports of Nepal. The college has approximate 1600 students. It has 70 teaching and 50 administrative staff on its rolls. The college primarily offers PCL level medical courses. Now the college offering bachelor level courses.

== History ==
The college was established in January 2001.

== Medical & Teaching Hospital ==
- 200 bed General Hospital with all medical requirements
- All the required equipment available.
- Additional Specialty equipment for Cardiology already available.

== Medical Sciences Education ==
The academy provides undergraduate and PCL programs in the fields of nursing and medical sciences. The courses offered by the institute are:

- BPH
- BN
- Staff Nurse (PCL)
- HA (General Medicine)
- DPH
- Lab Technician (LT)
- ANM
- CMA

== Research Laboratories ==
- Pathology
- Pharmacy
- Tissue Culture
- Bio Technology

== See also ==
- List of educational institutions in Rajbiraj
