= National Highway 15 (Nepal) =

Highway in Nepal

Gwarko–Lamatar–Dahaltar Highway ग्वार्को-लामाटार-दाहालटार राजमार्ग
- राष्ट्रिय राजमार्ग १५
- National Highway 15
- NH15 in red

Route information
- Maintained by MoPIT (Department of Roads)
- Length: 128 km (80 mi)
- History: Black topped, 2 lanes

Major junctions
- West end: Gwarko
- Lubhu, Panauti
- East end: Patalekhet

Location
- Country: Nepal
- Provinces: Bagmati Province
- Districts: Bhaktapur, Lalitpur, Kavrepalanchowk

Highway system
- Roads in Nepal
← NH14	→ NH16

NH15 or Gwarko–Lamatar–Dahaltar Road is a provincial national highway located in Bagmati Province of Nepal that runs from Gwarko (Katmandu Valley) to Dahaltar (Dhulikhel Municipality) via Lubhu, Lamatar, Lakuri Bhanjyang, Mane Dobhan and Panauti. Total length of the highway is 128 kilometres (80 mi).

The highway starts at Gwarko from Kathmandu Ringroad (NH39) and moves east into Mahalaxmi Municipality there it passes through neighborhoods like Lamatar and Lakuri Bhanjyang then the road moves into Panauti Municipality where it passes through Mane Dobhan, Aaruchaur, Bagmare, Panauti and Sunthan then enters into Dhulikhel Municipality and passes through Shankhupati Chaur then enters into Namobuddha Municipality where it passes through Dapcha Chhatrebangh and moves again into Dhulikhel Municipality and finally merges with NH03 at Patalekhet.

According to Madhav Paudel the construction of the highway began in 1954 and a motorable road from Gwarko to Panauti was built.

It is an alternative Highway of NH34 which connects Kathmandu with NH13 at Dhulikhel.
