= Moonlight English Boarding School =

Residential School in Nepal

Moonlight English Boarding School is a HSEB Board school in Resham Kothi, Birganj, Central Terai, Nepal.
