= Caliber International College =

College in Sagarmatha, Nepal

Location
- Rajbiraj-2; Sagarmatha; Nepal
- Coordinates: 26.3220°N 86.4410°E

Information
- Type: Higher Secondary Education Board (10+2); Bachelors
- Established: 2006
- School district: Saptari
- Principal: Mr. Arun Mahato
- Enrollment: 600 (approximately)
- Affiliations: Higher Secondary Education Board (+2 level); Purbanchal University

Caliber International College is an institution of higher education at Rajbiraj, Nepal. The college is established in 2006. The founder of the college is Arun Yadav. The college belongs to the first group of colleges in Rajbiraj to receive academic accreditation from the Purbanchal University. The college offer 10+2 and Bachelor level courses. This is the first college in Rajbiraj which offer Bachelor in Business Administration (BBA) stream under Purbanchal University.

The Principal is Arun Mahato. The college is affiliated to Higher Secondary Education Board and Purbanchal University.

== Academics ==
There are two courses of study in Caliber International College:

- 10+2 Level (Higher Secondary Education Board of Nepal, equivalent alternative to A-Level).
- Bachelor Level (Purbanchal University)

The college has approximate 600 students. It has 24 teaching and 14 administrative staff on its rolls. The college primarily offer 10+2 courses in Management, Science and Education until 2014. Now the college offering bachelor level courses in Management, Science and Education.

== See also ==
- List of educational institutions in Rajbiraj
