= Raj Rangasala =

- राज रङ्गशाला
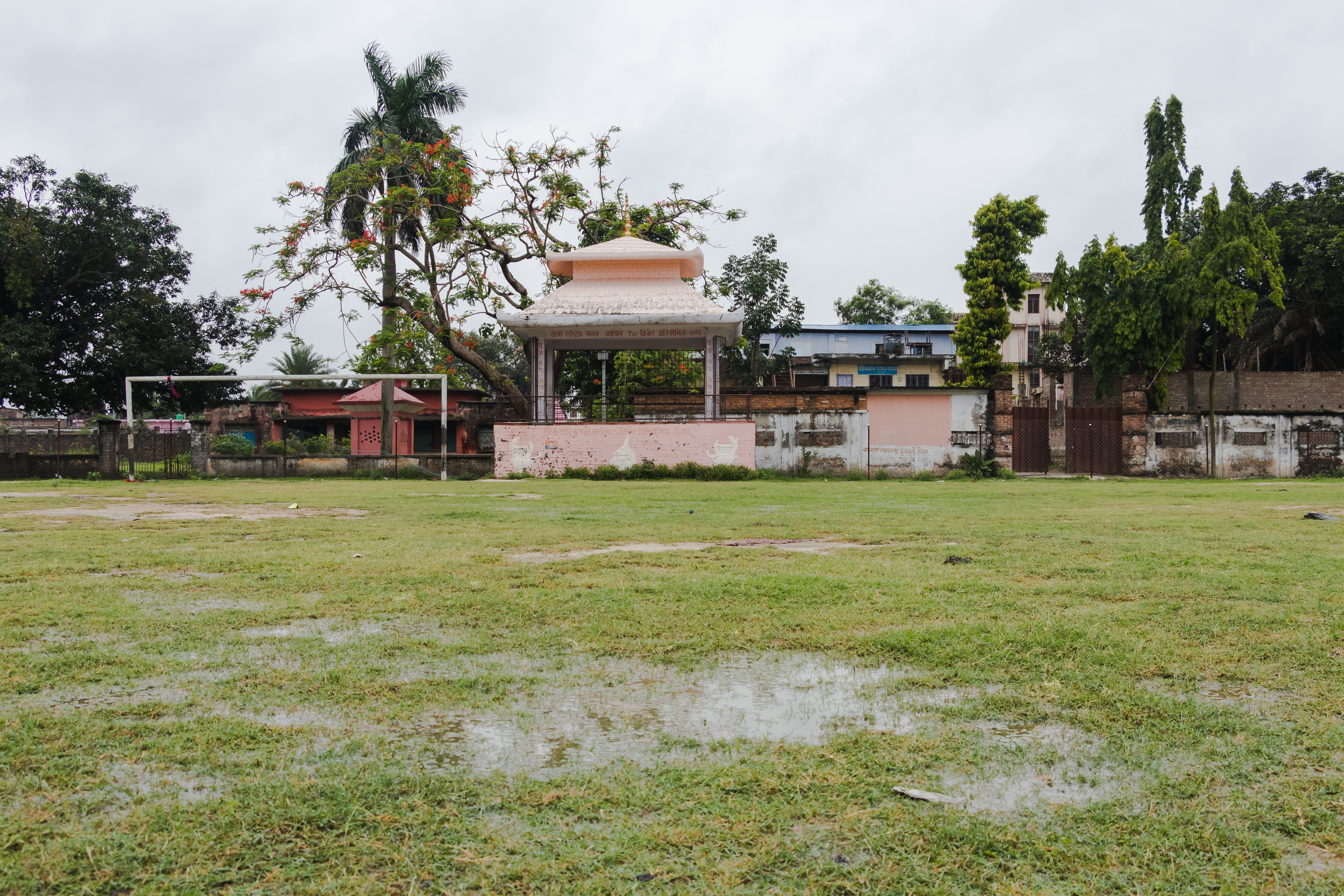
- Interactive map of Raj Rangasala
- Location: Rajbiraj, Saptari, Nepal
- Coordinates: 26°32′34″N 86°44′50″E
- Owner: Government of Nepal
- Operator: Saptari sports Association
- Capacity: 7,000 (as of 2020)
- Surface: grass

Construction
- Built: 1979
- Opened: 1982

Raj Rangasala (Nepali: राज रङ्गशाला; English: Raj Stadium) is a multi-purpose stadium in Rajbiraj, Saptari, Nepal. The stadium is located in the central part of the city and has a seating capacity of 7,000. The stadium was built in 1979 in 2 bigha 7 katha and 4 dhur. It is the biggest stadium in Saptari district. The rangasala is named after Rajbiraj city.

== History ==
The rangasala is one of the oldest stadiums in Nepal.The then governor of Saptari Badahakim Lakshya Bahadhur Gurung initiated building the stadium for sporting events in Rajbiraj in 1979.

== Sports Event ==
- PM Cup 2073
