= Rampur Malhaniya =

Rampura Malhaniya राम्पुरा मल्हनिया
- Neighborhood
- Location in Nepal Rampura Malhaniya (Nepal)
- Coordinates: 26.454722°N 86.795593°E
- Country: Nepal
- Province: Madhesh Province
- District: Saptari District
- Rural Municipality: Hanumannagar Kankalini

Population (2021)
  - Total: 6,786
- Time zone: UTC+5:45 (Nepal Time)

Rampura Malhaniya is a neighborhood or a town in Hanumannagar Kankalini Municipality in Saptari District of Madhesh Province, Nepal. At the time of the 1991 Nepal census it had a population of 4728 people living in 835 individual households. According to the 2021 Nepal census the town population is 7558. The total area of the town is 7.84 square kilometres (3.03 sq mi) and the town falls in ward no. 14 of Hanumannagar Kankalini Municipality.

Rampur Malhaniya is located opposite the Indian town Kunauli. Both towns work as an exit-entry point on the Indo-Nepal border. NH14 connects this town with district headquarters at Rajbiraj which is located at 25 kilometres (16 mi) of distance from this town.
