= National Highway 14 (Nepal) =

Highway in Nepal

Basaha-Phattepur-Malhaniya Highway बसाहा-फत्तेपुर-मल्हनीया राजमार्ग
- राष्ट्रिय राजमार्ग १४
- National Highway 14
- NH14 in red

Route information
- Maintained by MoPIT (Department of Roads)
- Length: 33.72 km (20.95 mi)
- History: Black topped, 2 lane

Major junctions
- West end: Rampur Malhaniya
- Rajbiraj, Beriyar, Phattepur
- East end: Basaha

Location
- Country: Nepal
- Provinces: Koshi Province, Madhesh Province
- Districts: Saptari, Udayapur

Highway system
- Roads in Nepal
← NH13	→ NH15

NH14 or Basaha-Phattepur-Malhaniya road is an Interprovincial National Highway of Nepal that runs from the Indo-Nepal border of Rampur Malhaniya in Saptari District (Madhesh Province) to Bashasa, Udayapur District (Koshi Province). The total length of the highway is 33.72 kilometres (20.95 mi). NH14 is split into two sections and NH05 connects them.

The highway starts at Rampur Malhaniya near the Indo-Nepal border and runs towards Rajbiraj where the first section of this highway terminates after connecting to NH05. The other section starts at Beriyar in Kanchanrup Municipality separating from Highway NH-5 and runs towards Phattepur on Madhesh-Koshi border. From the Madhesh-Koshi border it enters to Udayapur District and runs towards Basaha where it finally merges with NH03.

NH14 (in detail)
Section	Section Link	Section Name	Length (KM)	Area
Section 1	NH14-001	Basaha-Phattepur	08.80	Chaudandigadhi Municipality; Belaka Municipality
Section 1	NH14-002	Phattepur-Beriyar	13.69	Saptakoshi Municipality; Kanchanrup Municipality
Section 2	NH14-003	Hanuman Mandir-Sagarmatha Zonel Hospital	0.91	Rajbiraj Municipality
Section 2	NH14-004	Sagarmatha Zonal Hospital - Lijatole Campus Road	0.62	Rajbiraj Municipality
Section 2	NH14-005	Lijatole Campus Road - Rampur Malhaniya	9.70	Bishnupur RM; Chinnamasta RM; Tilathi Koiladi RM; Hanumannagar Kankalini
	NH14	Basaha-Phattepur-Malhaniya	33.72	Koshi Province
