= Rajdevi Temple =

Hindu temple in Madhesh, Nepal

Rajdevi Mandir
- राजदेवी मन्दिर
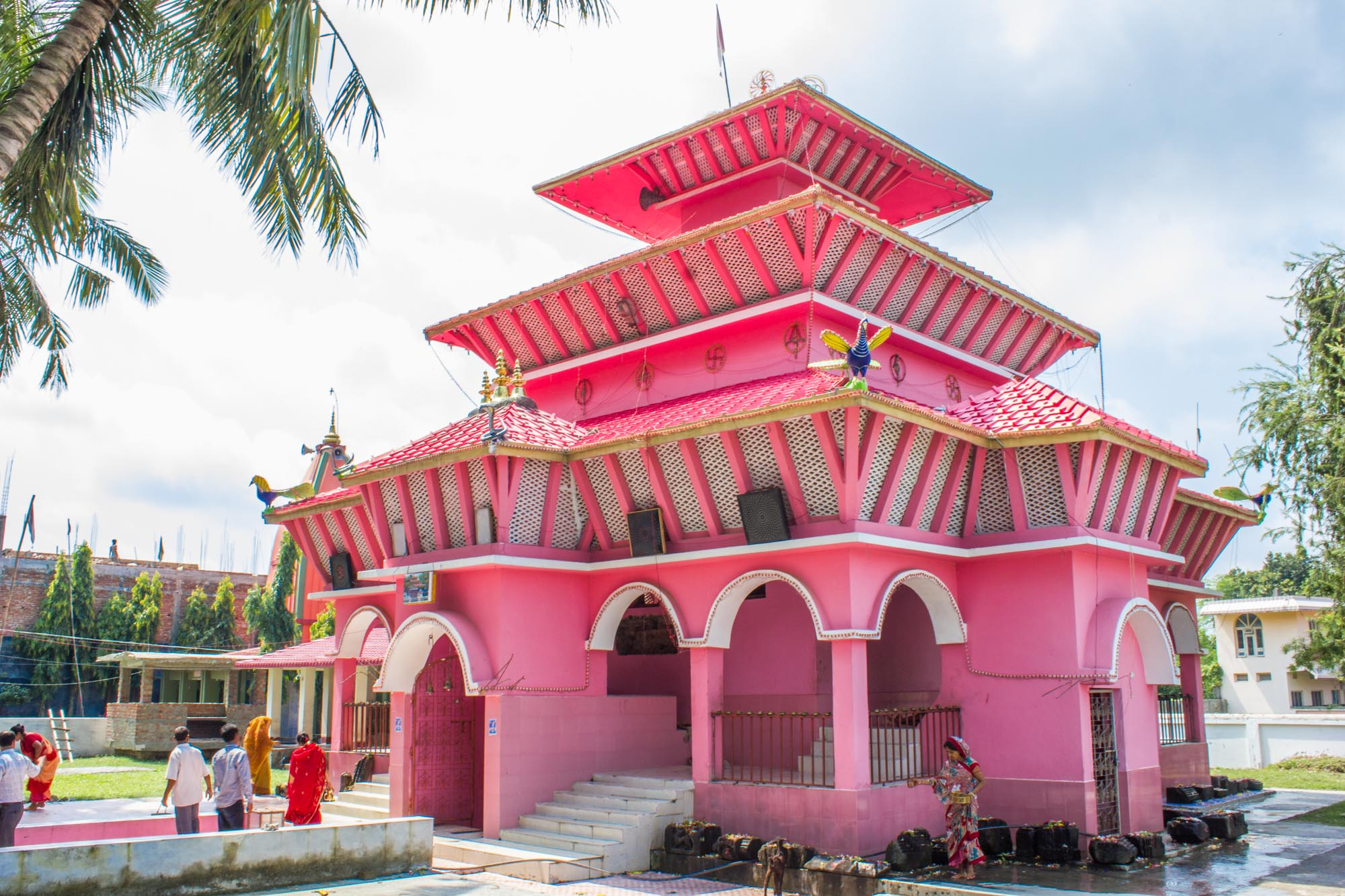

- Rajdevi Temple in Nepal

Religion
- Affiliation: Hinduism
- District: Saptari
- Deity: Rajdevi The goddess Bhagawati
- Festival: Bada Dashain

Location
- Location: Rajdevi Tole, Rajbiraj
- State: Madhesh
- Country: Nepal
- Coordinates: 26°32′26″N 86°44′55″E

Architecture
- Type: Pagoda Style
- Completed: Unknown; earliest reference in the 1097-98.

Specifications
- Temple: 1
- Inscriptions: Written in Stone
- Elevation: 76 m (249 ft)

Rajdevi Temple (Devanagari:राजदेवी मन्दिर) is a Hindu temple and Shakta pithas in Eastern Nepal. The primary deity is Rajdevi. It is situated in the Rajdevi Tole, Rajbiraj, Saptari and draws Nepali and Indian pilgrims, especially in Bada Dashain. Thousands of goats are sacrificed there during Dashain.

== History ==
The temple holds great historical, cultural, and religious significance in the local and neighbouring areas. The statue of the deity Rajdevi was found 1000 years ago and has been kept in the same place. The present structure of the temple was reconstructed in 90's. This temple is known to be the family temple of the brother of the King Janak, King Kushadhwaja. The temple was earlier restored by Sena's of Makwanpur, who were descendants of Nanyadeva in the 14th century.

== Pilgrimage ==
Every year, thousands of pilgrims from Nepal, India and other countries visit Rajdevi Temple to worship the Bhagawati. During the festivals of Dashain and Tihar, there is presence of even more worshipers.
