= Dapcha Chhatrebangh =

Dapcha Chhatrebangh Mathilo Hatiya
- Village
- दाप्चा छत्रेबाँझ
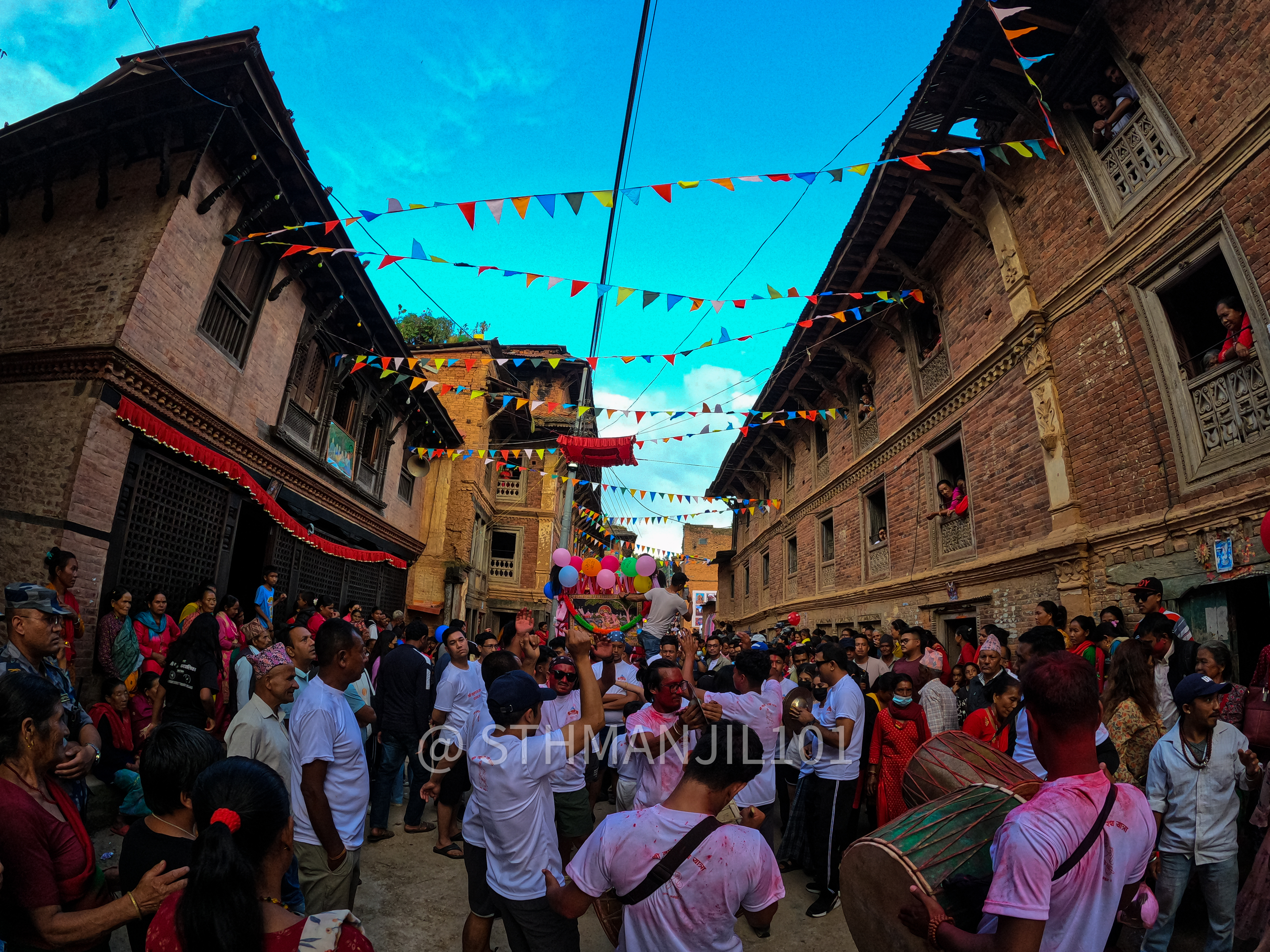

- Location in Nepal
- Coordinates: 27°34′50″N 85°35′26″E
- Country: Nepal
- Province: Bagmati Province
- District: Kavrepalanchok District

Government
  - Type: Mayor–council government
  - Mayor: Kunsang Lama
  - Deputy Mayor: Ratna Bahadur Lama
- Highest elevation: 1,750 m (5,740 ft)
- Lowest elevation: 1,683 m (5,522 ft)

Population (2021)
  - Total: 1,684
- Time zone: UTC+5:45 (NST)
- Postal code: 45210
- Area code: 011
- Website: namobuddhamun.gov.np/ne%20www.namobuddhamun.gov.np/ne https://www.youtube.com/watch?si=cAeXv6rfdZYbsSZi&v=sVj8_L_njgg&feature=youtu.be https://www.youtube.com/watch?v=N375kALKwUg

Dapcha Chatrebangh, or Dapcha, is a village near Mount Gaurishankar in Namobuddha Municipality in Kavrepalanchok District in Bagmati Province of central Nepal, about 15 kilometres southeast of the district headquarters of Dhulikhel. It is a ridgetop settlement, and was previously on the trade route that led to Kathmandu.

The village has forty-five historic wooden and brick buildings. The local culture is historically Newar. The village has been identified as a possible future tourist destination.

The village is part of the Kavrepalanchok District "grain basket". The roads are good, and connect to the BP Highway.

Residents are reliant on springs for water. These have been drying up, causing water shortages and resulting in people moving away from the area. This creates further problems of labour shortage. In 2013, a research project started to map springs and to try to stop them drying up. There is a nearby river, the Dapcha Khola.

The village has a health post. This includes a laboratory. There is a secondary school in the village, Dapcha Secondary School.

The eighteenth-century ruler Prithvi Narayan Shah ordered a fort to be built at Dapcha.

In March 2006, during the Nepalese Civil War, thirteen Royal Nepali Army soldiers were killed in the area by soldiers from the People's Liberation Army.

Most of the villagers are Hindu or Buddhist, but there are some Christian and Muslim families. There is a shrine at Namobuddha near the village, where Shakyamuni Buddha is worshipped. In the village are three temples to Bhimsen, and one to Kalika Devi. The villagers hold jatras, including one in honour of Krishna Janmasthami.

== Historical ==
Long ago, there lived a king known by the name of Shankheshwar. One day, Shankeshwar was asked for land by a yogi. The king then conceded that all the land that shall be covered by the yogi before the sundown shall belong to him. The yogi had already begun his journey when he suddenly realized he had lost the handle of his 'Khukhuri' or 'Dap'. Subconsciously, he let out the sound 'Dap Ja' which came to be the name of his land. However due to the phonetic change over the period of time, the place is now called 'Dapcha'.

Furthermore, the origin of the word 'Chatrebanjh' comes from the umbrella shaped tree of 'banjh' (Oak) which was located at present day Krishna Madhyamik Bidhyalaya. Translated in Nepali from the word Umbrella, 'Chata' combined with 'Banjh' became 'Chatrebanjh'.

Nonetheless, the name is also believed to have originated due to exemplary business of the Chatra Ram lineage. Thus in present day, we know ancient 'Dapja' by the name of 'Dapcha Chatrebanjh' or occasionally as 'Dapcha Chatrabas'.

== Business Hub ==
Dapcha Bazar or simply Dapcha is often recalled as a lively place. People from the east, usually traders, would often visit Dapcha. A typical trader would spend up to 3 days trading their merchandise. Even the prosperous Kathmandu Valley had to rely on Dapcha with commodities such as grains, staples, ghee, goats, chickens, buffalos etc.

Kul Bahadur, a local merchant and his family members mentioned the likelihood of war between Nepal and Tibet during the reign of Rana Prime Minister Chandra Shumsher. When enquired by Prime Minister Shur Shumsher if anyone could provide food for the soldiers and in what quantity, Kul Bahadur promised to feed one thousand soldiers for 3 months with staples like corn and buckwheat.

This indicates the immense degree of economic independence that prevailed in Dapcha during the period.

== Festivals ==
=== Lakhey Naach ===
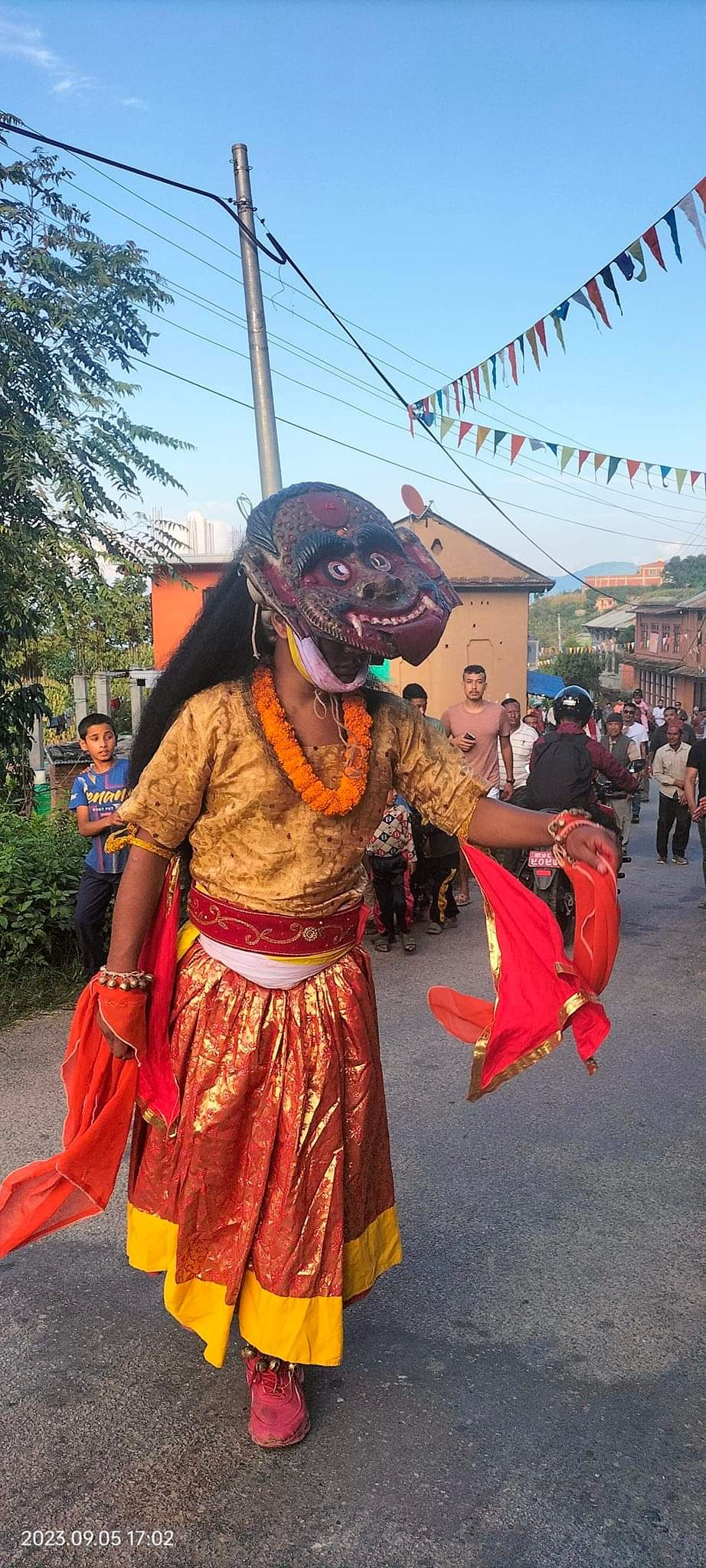

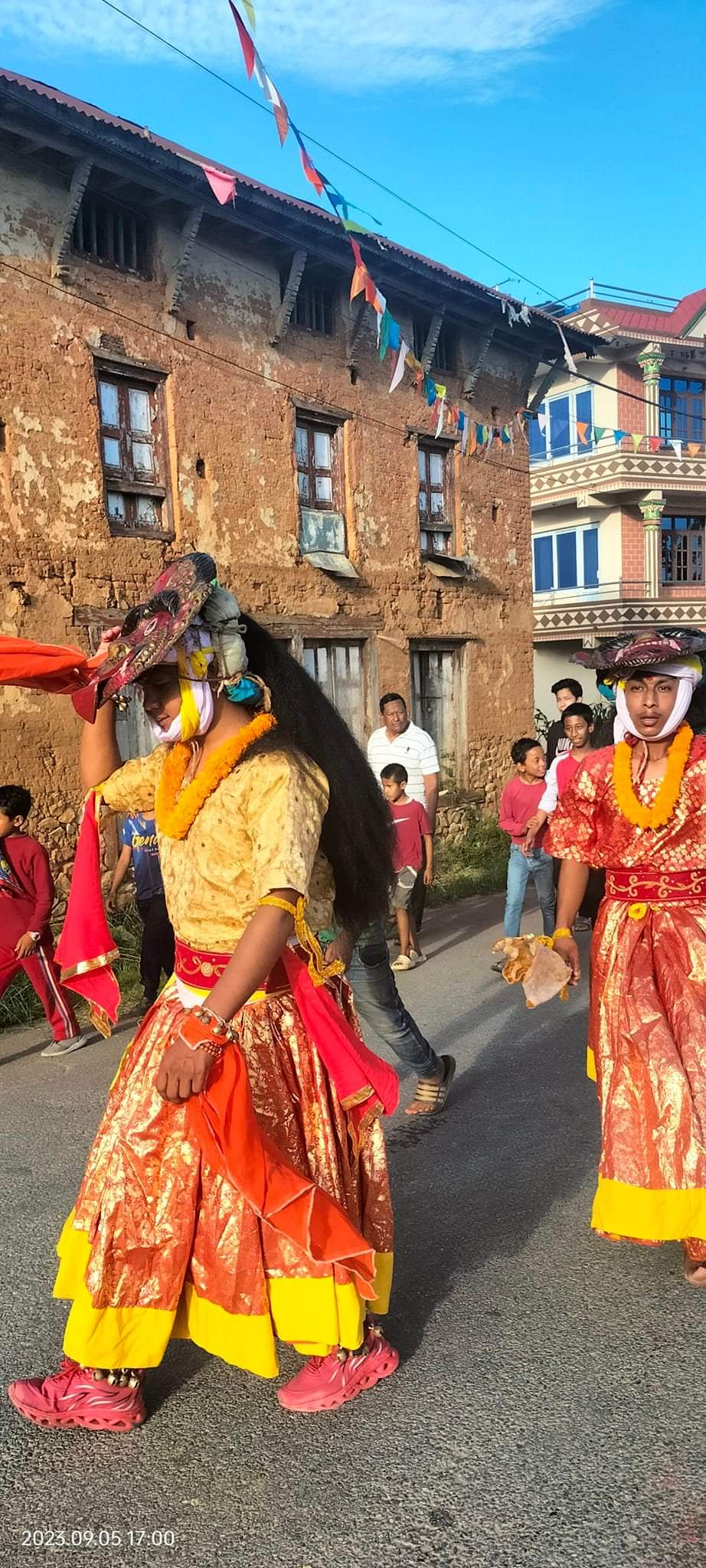

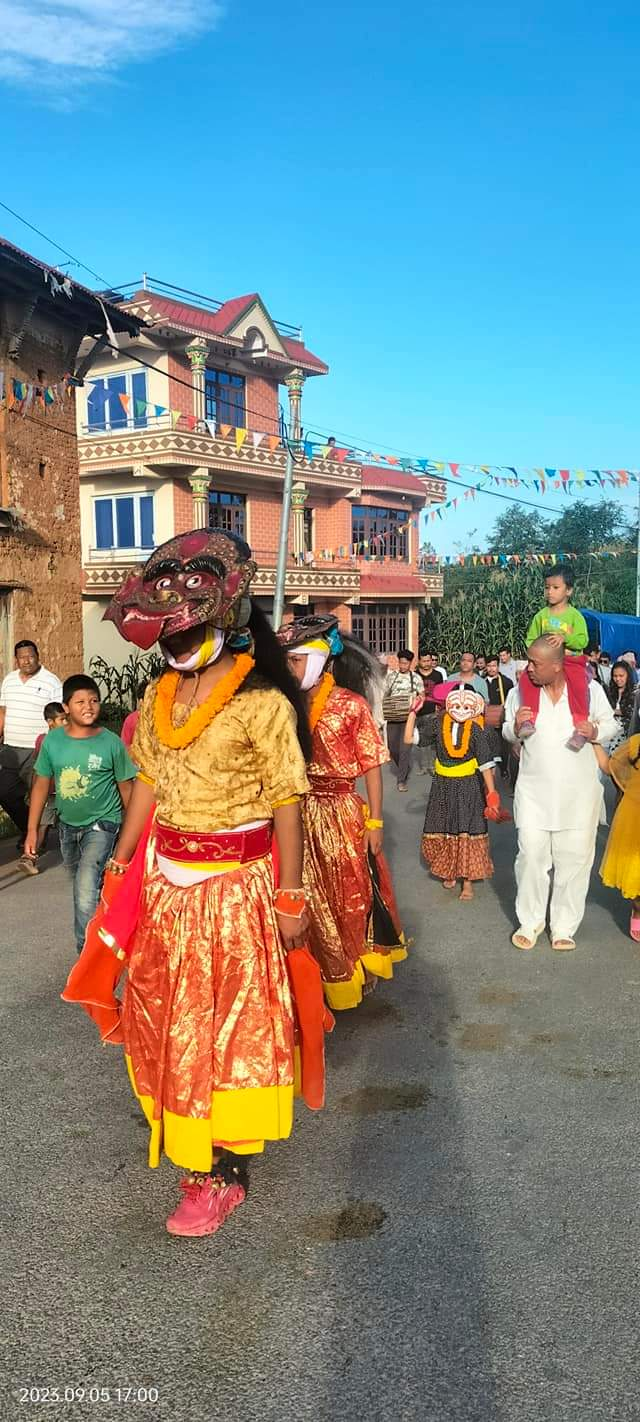

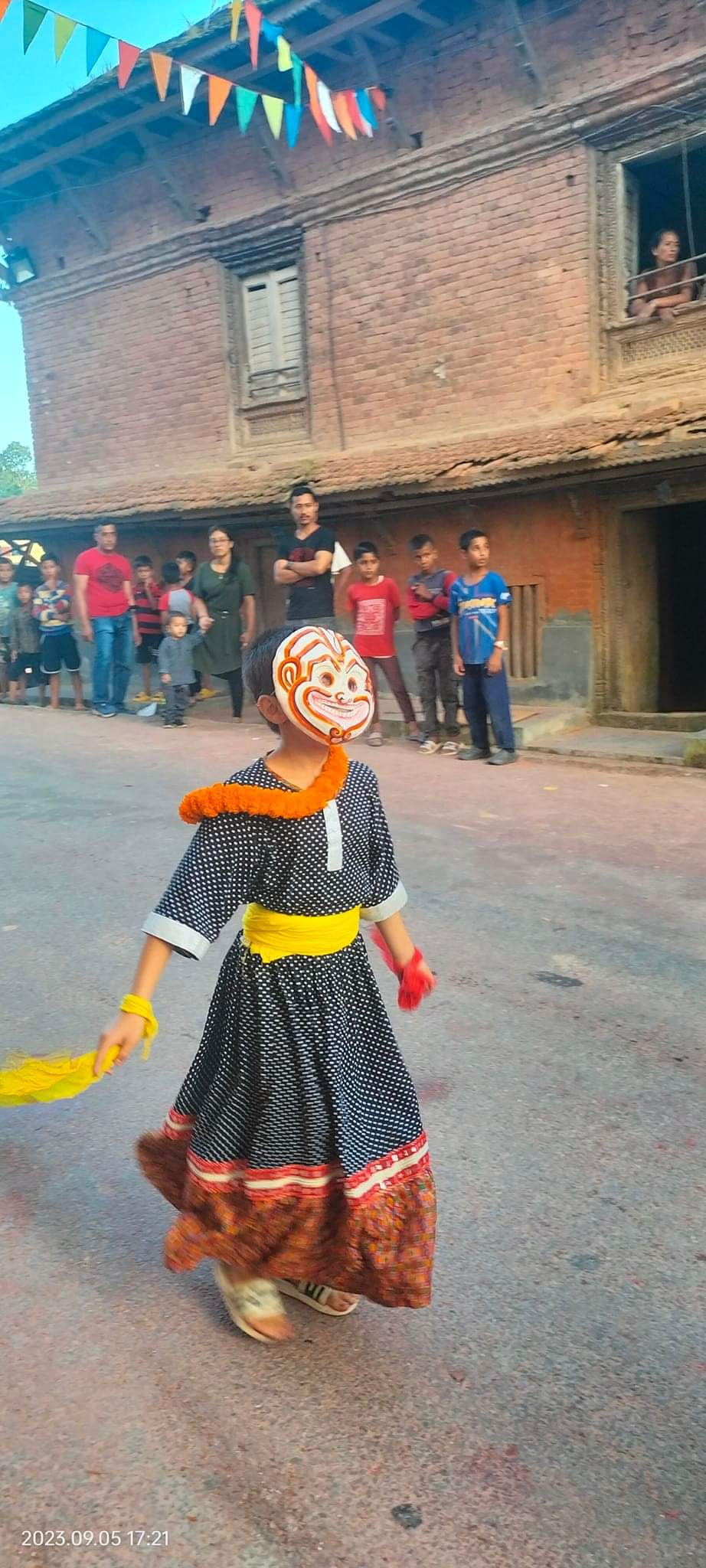

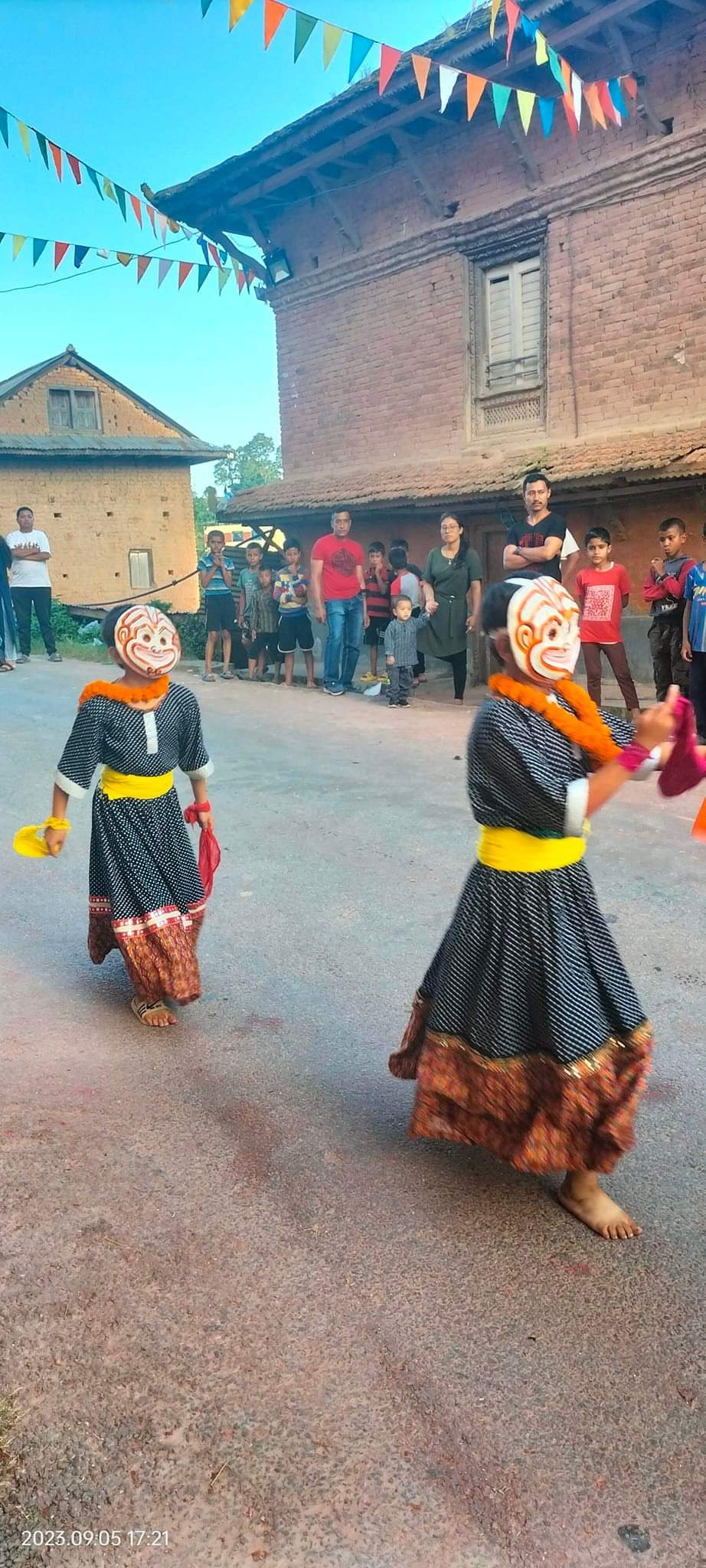

Performed by two 'Lakhey' and two 'Nakheycha', the dance is staged during the daytime of 'Sasthi' in the month of August or 6th day after the full moon in Bhadra.

People have varied opinions as to why this dance is performed. However, it is generally accepted that the dance is about the Lakhey demon coming to create troubles for people during the daytime.

Following Lakhey Nach, Devi Bhairav Nach is performed in the evening symbolizing the elimination of evil spirits and powers.

=== Devi Bhairav Naach ===
As mentioned previously, the Devi Bhairav Nach is performed on the evening of Lakhey Nach or two days prior to Shri Krishna Janmashtami Jatra which as we’ll discover is a major festival for the people of Dapcha. The Devi Bhairav Nach is performed by seven gods and goddesses (humans wearing colorful dresses and masks of different deities). Although some of the dances are performed alone others are performed as a group.

The performance is inaugurated by Bhairav followed by Kari (Mahakali), Barahi, Devi, Bishnu, Kumari and Ganesh respectively. Accompanied by the sounds of various instruments, the nach is performed an hour before midnight.

=== Shree Krishna Janmasthami Jatra ===
Shri Krishna Janmashtami Jatra is celebrated on the day of Krishna Janmashtami or the 8th day after the full moon of August. Women of Dapcha perform fasting all day and worship Krishna at midnight wishing for husbands like Lord Krishna or long life of their husbands in case they are already married. On the day of Navami (9th day after the full moon of August) people celebrate the birth of Krishna by carrying 'Khata'. Hence, it is also known as Shri Krishna Janmashtami Ratha Yatra. There are three Krishna Ratha, one in each place; Tallo Hatiya, Kotkali and Dapcha Bazar. The people of Tallo Hatiya carry out the Khata in the morning whereas the people of Maslo hatiya (Kotkali) carry out the Khata during the day. The tradition of celebrating this jatra is believed to have started in 1960 on Bazar and in 2001 on Kotkali.

== Gallery ==
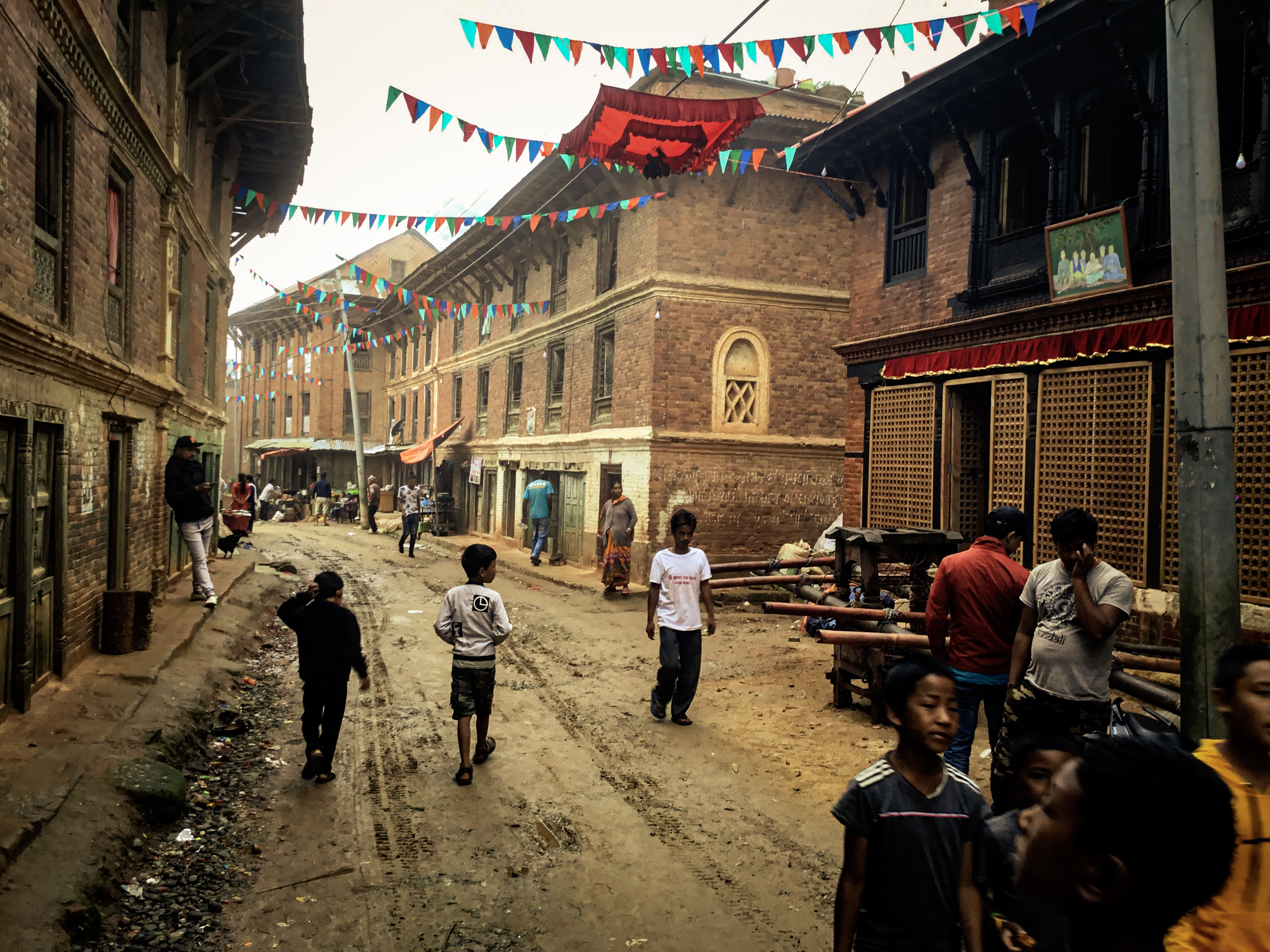
Dapcha bazaar during Krishnaasthami Jatra

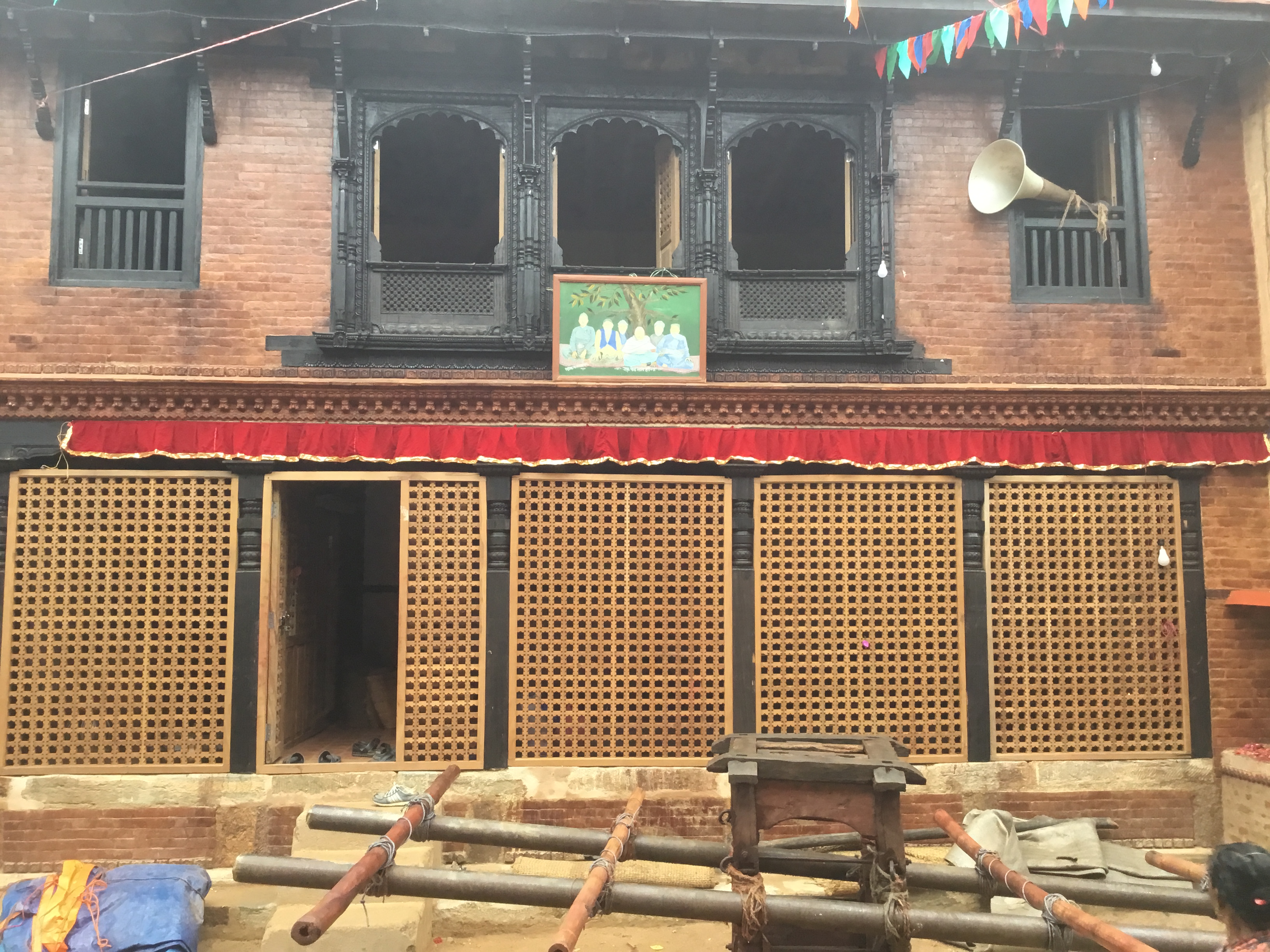
Shree Krishna Temple

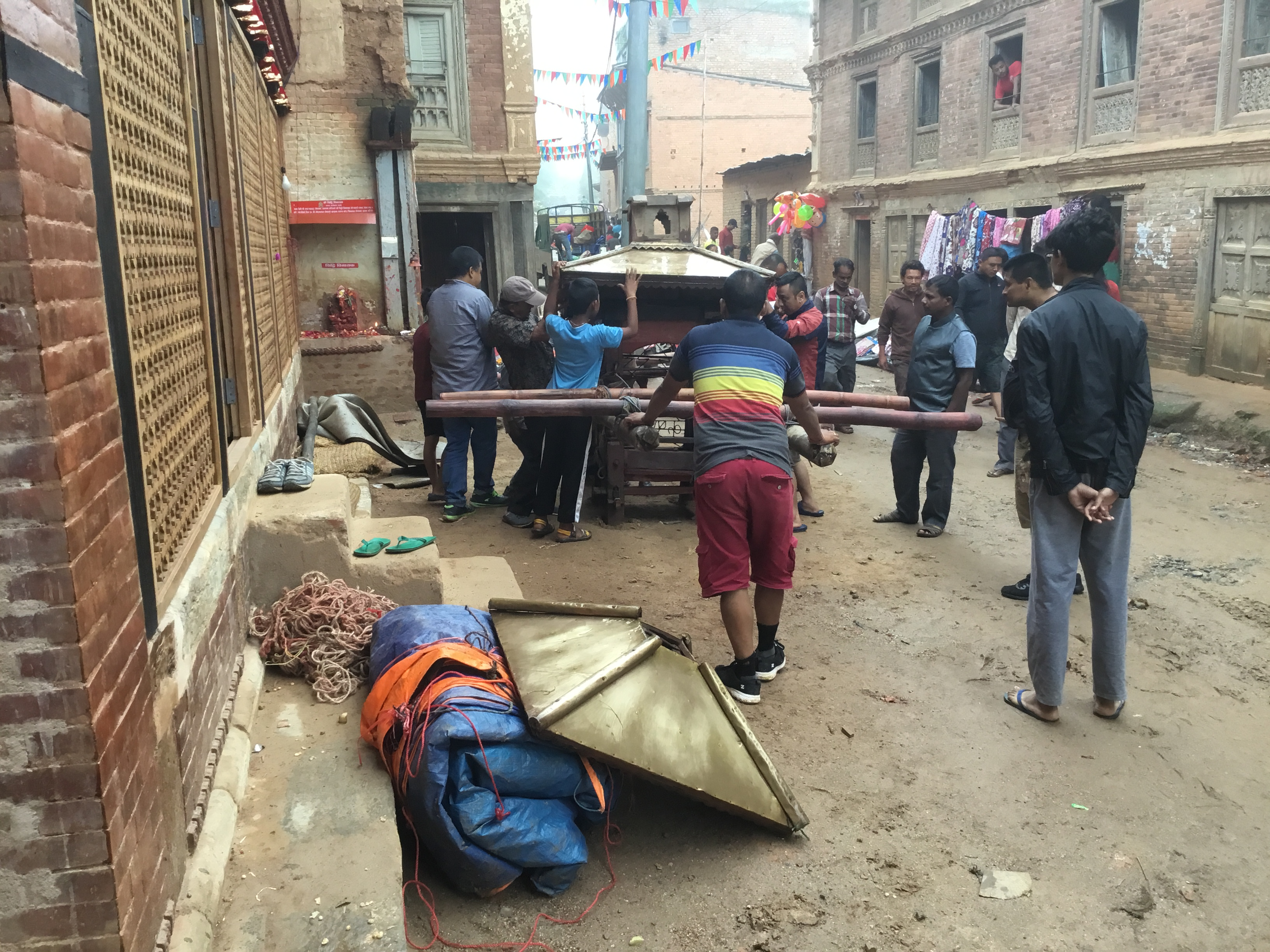
Chariot-making during Shree Krishna asthami jatra

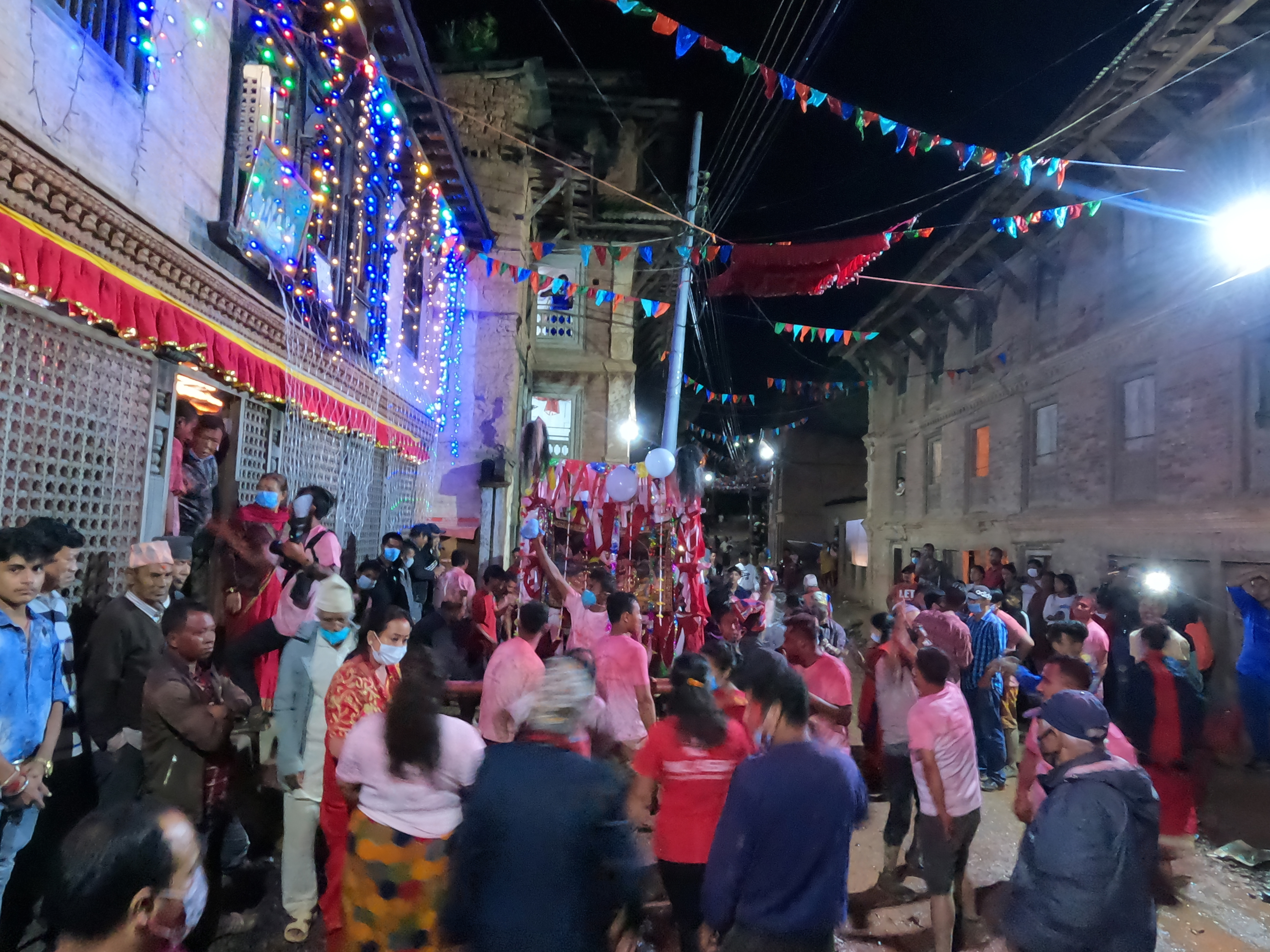
