= List of educational institutions in Rajbiraj =

This list provides the list of various educational institutions in city of Rajbiraj, Saptari District, Nepal.

Rajbiraj is home to several educational institutions for pre-primary, primary, secondary, high-secondary, senior-secondary, graduate and post-graduate studies. Rajbiraj is an educational hub of Eastern Region of Nepal. The important point to note in the list is significant rise of Nursing colleges & +2 colleges in the city which attracts the student from neighbour district & Eastern region of Nepal.

== Purbanchal University affiliated College ==
- Caliber International College
- Laxmi Ballav Narsingh Bahumukhi Campus, Rajbiraj
- Saptarishi Health Science College, Rajbiraj
- Saptarishi Multiple Science College, Rajbiraj
- Unique Educational Academy Pvt. Ltd., Rajbiraj

== Tribhuvan University affiliated College ==
- Mahendra Bindeshwori Multiple Campus, Rajbiraj
- Paradise campus rajbiraj with B.B.S
- World Vision Modern Campus, Rajbiraj with B.Ed. & B.B.S.
- Engineering College (under-construction) in the premises of Ma Bi Bi Campus

Rajbiraj Model Campus with BBS

== Technical Institution & CTEVT Affiliated colleges ==
- Chinnamasta institute of technology
- College of Software and Engineering College
- Jagadamba Technical Institute
- Nepal Softech College Of Computer Engineering
- Rajdevi Technical Institute
- Udayapur Technical Training School

== Medical Colleges ==
- Sai Krishna Medical College & Hospital (SKMCH)
- Unique College Of Medical Science & Hospital Pvt. Ltd.
- Ram Raja Prasad Singh Academy of Health Sciences (under construction)

== Nursing Colleges ==
- Chinnamasta Nursing College
- Jagadamba Medical institute
- Sai Krishna Nursing College
- Unique College Of Medical Science & Hospital Pvt. Ltd.
- Ramraja Prasad Singh Nursing College : It is inside the zonal hospital premises which is under-construction.

== +2 Colleges with Graduation ==
- Caliber International College
- Happyland Higher Secondary School
- Chinnamasta Higher Secondary School
- Kshitiz Education Foundation
- Mission Higher Secondary School
- Oxford International College
- Laliguraans Higher Secondary School
- Rajbiraj Model Higher Secondary
- Janaki Higher Secondary School
- Rajdevi Thakodevi Jogendra Bhagat Uchha Madhyamik Vidhyalaya
- Public Bindeshwori Uchha Madhyamik Vidhyalaya
- World Vision Modern Secondary School& Campus

== Schools ==
- LITTLE FLOWER SECONDARY SCHOOL/COLLEGE, RAJBIRAJ-2
- Prime HolyCross Academy
- Happyland secondary school
- Janki higher secondary school
- Little Flower Secondary School Rajbiraj-2
- Premier Secondary Boarding School
- little angels modern secondary school
- Durga Secondary School
- Global English Boarding School
- Green boarding secondary school
- Green secondary school
- Kankalini Academy Rupani Road Rajbiraj
- Kesho anirodha Ma.Bi.
- Laxmi English Boarding School Rajbiraj-5. Saptari
- Maa Sarawati English School
- Manokamna Higher S. School
- New Rose Public English School
- New Sunlight English School
- New sunshine english academy diman-4 saptari
- Peace Zone Model School
- Rajdevi Secondary School
- Saptarsihi Educational Academy
- Shanti Niketan Educational Academy
- Shiva International Boarding Secondary School
- Universal Academy
- World Vision Modern Sec. School & Campus

== See also ==
Template:School and colleges in Rajbiraj
