= Hanumannagar, Saptari =

Former Village Development Committee in Nepal

Coordinates: 26°30′N 86°51′E

Hanumannagar हनुमाननगर Hanumannagar Kankalini Municipality
- Village development committee
- Interactive map of Hanumannagar
- Country: Nepal
- Zone: Sagarmatha Zone
- District: Saptari District

Government
  - Mayor: BIRENDRA MAJHI
  - Represented in Parliament By: Nawal Kishore Sah (Rambabu)

Population (2011)
  - Total: 6,275
- Time zone: UTC+5:45 (Nepal Time)
- Postal code: 56401
- Area code: 031

Hanumannagar is a village development committee in Saptari District in the Sagarmatha Zone of south-eastern Nepal. It is named after the Hanuman Temple situated here with the rare idol of Lord Hanuman in Black Stone as a Child. It was the former headquarter of Saptari District. It was established by Rana Rulers after continuous flooding in Bihar. Rich merchants from Bihar's then Bhagalpur District were invited to stay and trade in Nepal. On his invite lot of Marwari and Deshwali Merchants come to the place. Accordingly Hanumannagar was made District and Anchal Headquarters. The city started thriving on trade between India and Tibet and at one point in time it was the second biggest town in Eastern Nepal. Even Ram Manohar Lohia stayed in Hanuman Nagar when he was hiding from British Rulers of India.

At the time of the 2011 Nepal census it had a population of 6275 people living in 957 individual households. The VDC consists of Health Post which have been set up by the Government and the facility of Electricity is provided to maximum of the household. It to also the trade center for neighboring 15 villages with the mix source if Income including Business and Agriculture. The VDC consists of two banks (Rastriya Banijay Bank) and (Agricultural Development Bank). The education institution here have been providing Secondary level of education since 1951 A.D. through government school along with three other private schools which are yet to deliver their best. In concern of security the place has a well established police station and it is among those police stations which Maoist were not able to bomb during insurgency. It had a three level security of Nepal Police, Armes Police Force, and Royal Nepal Army serving the people and securing them during insurgency.

Hanumannagar now comes under Hanumannagar Yoginimai Municipality. This former headquarter of Saptari District is still one of the most developed cities of this area. There are many business firms and many business person working in this place.

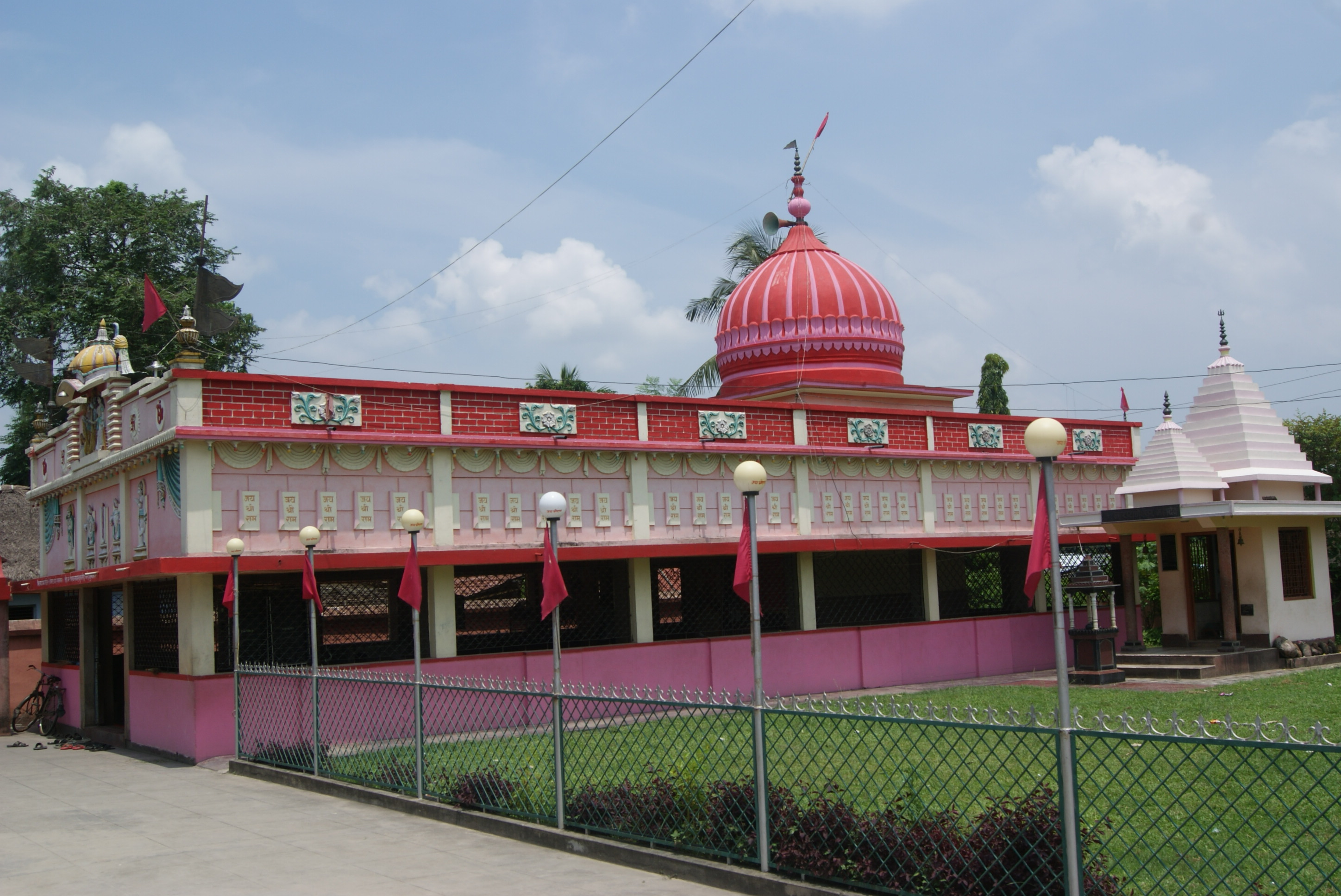
Hanumannagar Mandir

Shailesh Kumar Sah is the mayor elected in recent election held in 2017. He is a prominent business man and a young leader. In 2022, Birendra Majhi was elected as the mayor. The village has a majority of farmers which are under the poverty line but the VDC(Village Development Council ) has been working constantly through various programs to increase the agricultural productivity.
