= Department of Education (Nepal) =

Nepalese government department

- शिक्षा विभाग

Agency overview
- Formed: May 23, 1999
- Agency executive: Ana Prasad Neupane, Director General
- Website: www.doe.gov.np cehrd.gov.np

Department of Education (Nepali: शिक्षा विभाग), abbreviated as DoE, is the executive department of the Ministry of Education, Science and Technology, Nepal government responsible for the management and upkeep of the Nepalese system of education. It is the main implementation agency of Nepali educational plan and policy and is responsible for the basic and secondary education system in Nepal.

== History ==
DoE was established on 23 May 1999.
