= Rajbiraj =

First planned city of Nepal

Rajbiraj राजविराज
- City
- Rajbiraj Municipality
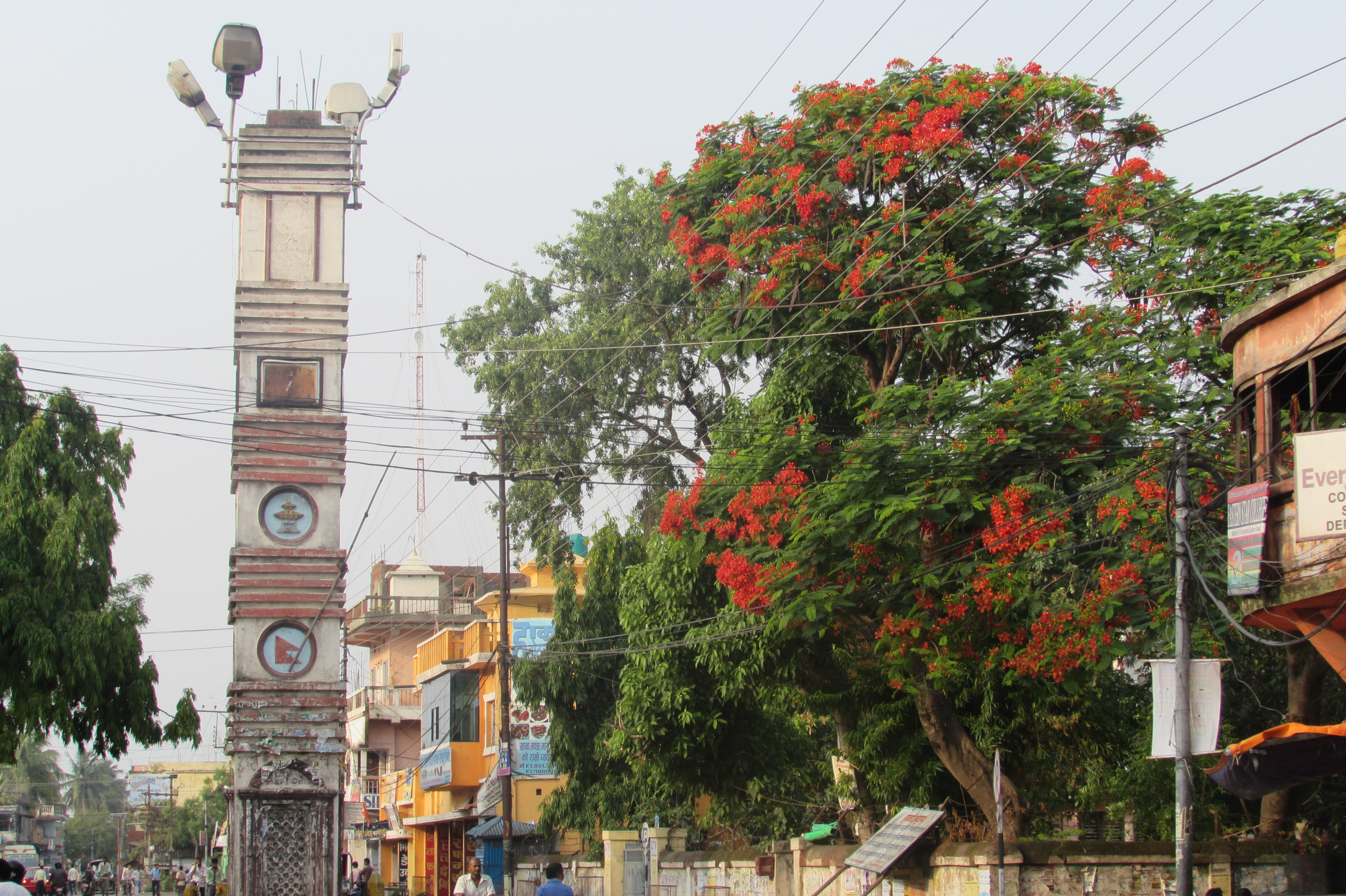
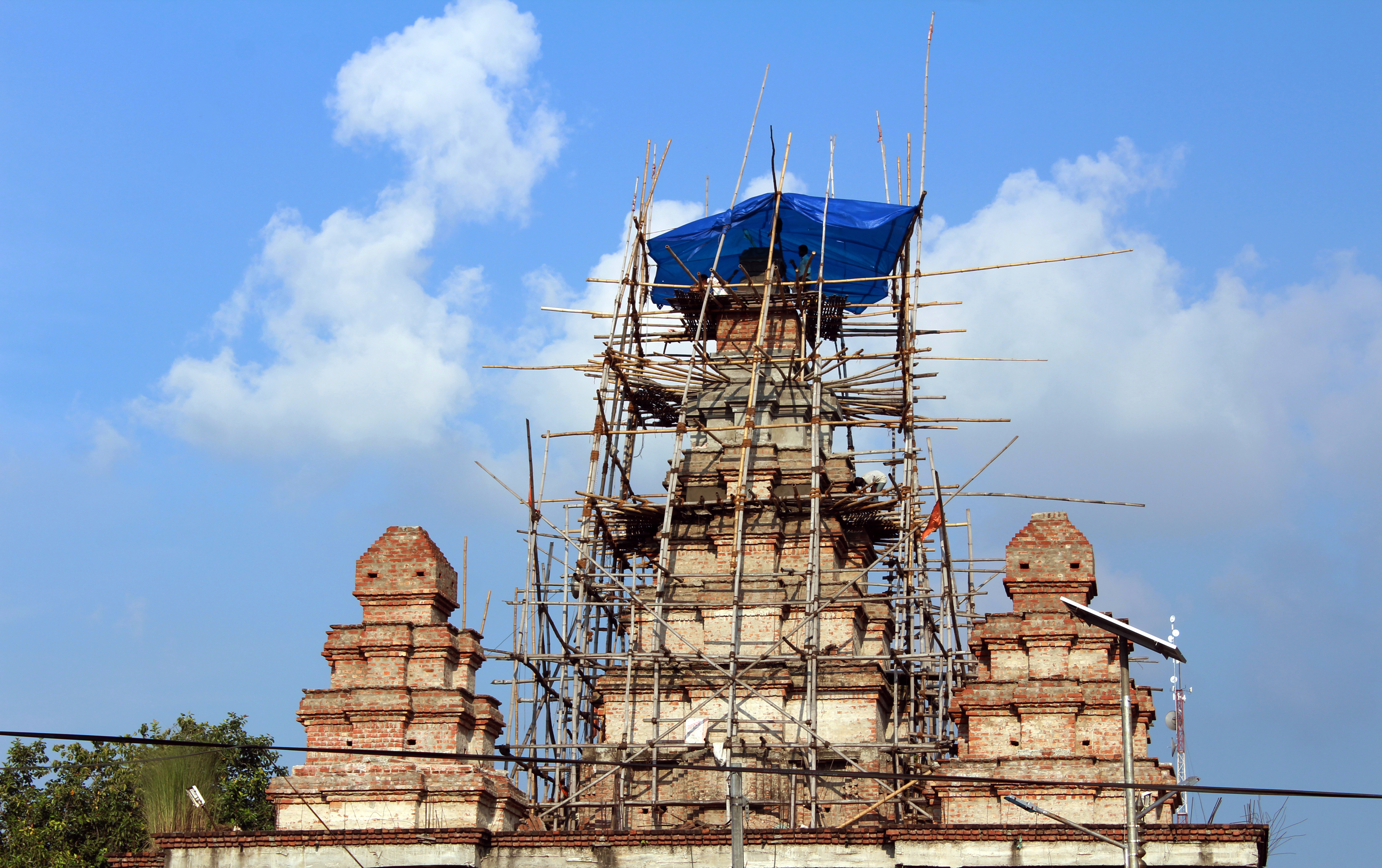
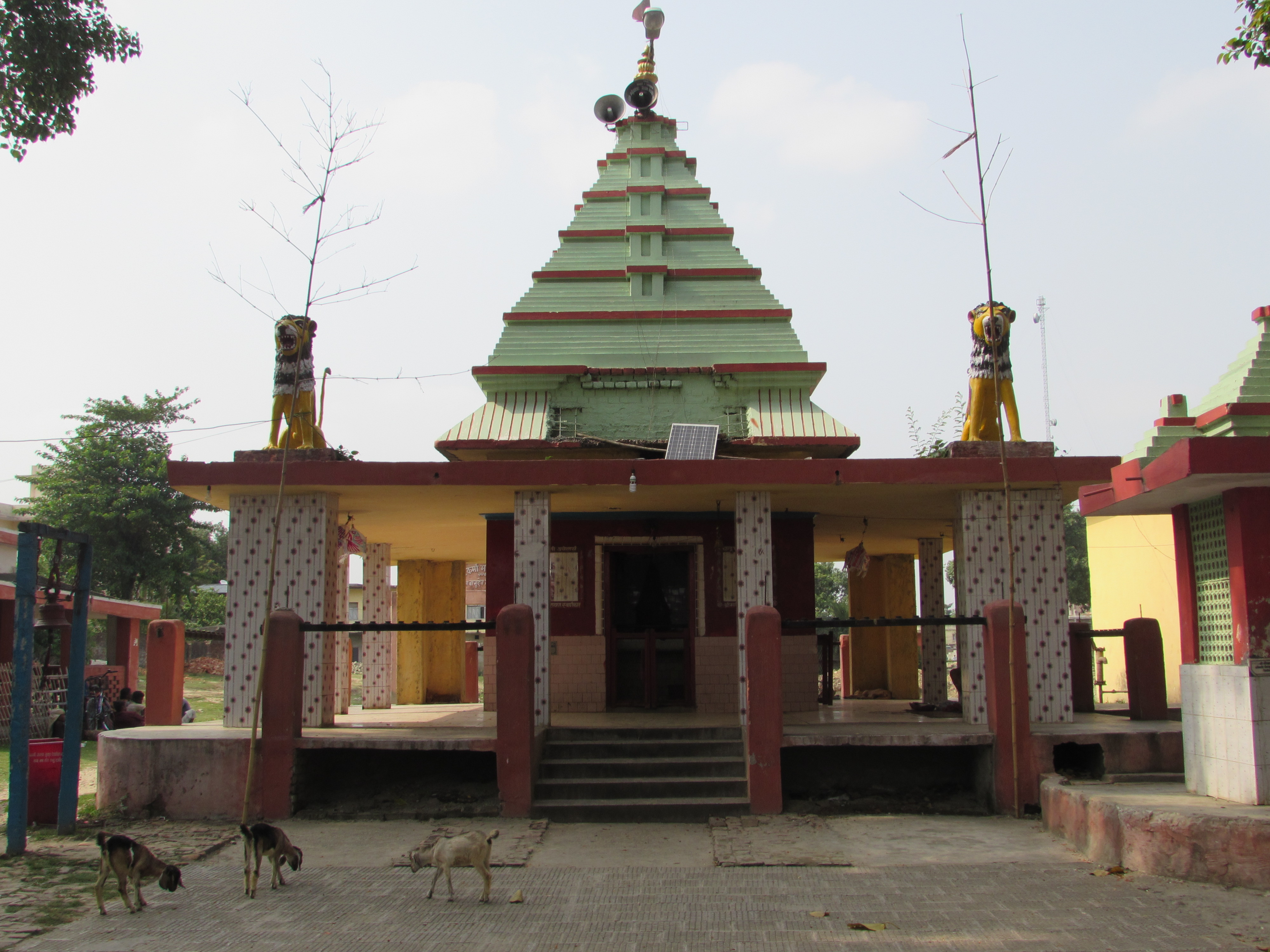
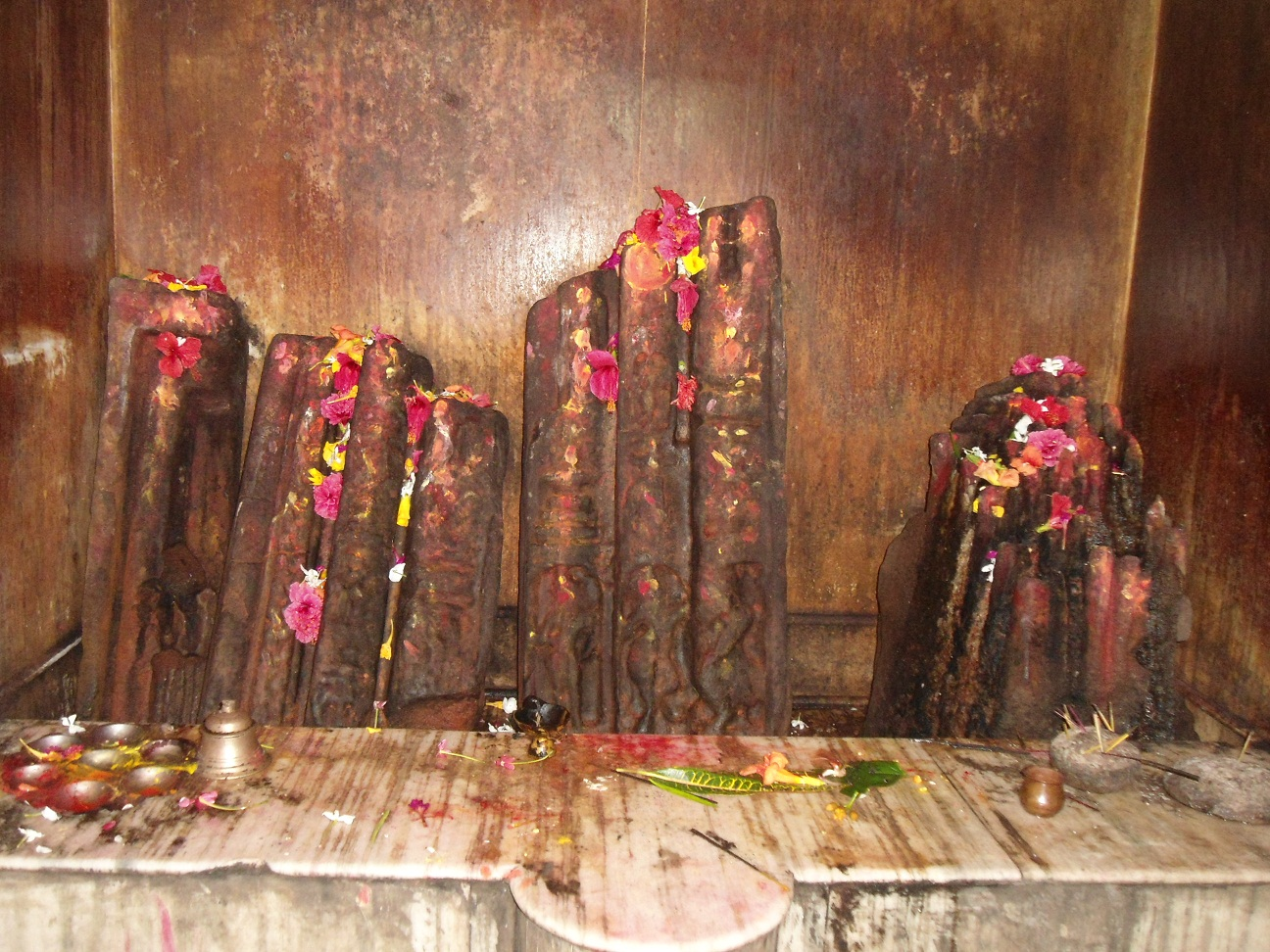
- Clockwise from top Gajendra Chowk formerly Tribhuwan Chowk, Krishna Temple, Rajdevi Temple, Bhagwati Temple and Neta Chowk/Dashan Chowk/Ghantaghar
- Motto(s): "Rajbiraj city, prosperous green city"
- Map Location of Rajbiraj
- Location within Madhesh Province Location within Nepal
- Coordinates: 26°32′26″N 86°44′55″E
- Country: Nepal
- Province: Madhesh
- Region: Mithila
- District: Saptari
- No. of wards: 16
- Named for: Rajdevi Temple

Government
  - Mayor: Vacant
  - Deputy mayor: Ishrat Praveen (PSP-N)
  - MP: Ramjee Yadav (Rastriya Swatantra Party)

Area
  - Total: 55.64 km^{2} (21.48 sq mi)
- Elevation: 76 m (249 ft)

Population (2021 census)
  - Total: 70,803
  - Density: 1,273/km^{2} (3,296/sq mi)
- Demonym: Rajbirajian
- Time zone: UTC+5:45 (NST)
- Postal code: 56400
- Area code: 031
- Literacy rate: 76.60%
- Website: www.rajbirajmun.gov.np

Rajbiraj (Maithili: राजविराज) is a mid-sized municipality located in the south-eastern part of Madhesh Province of Nepal. The city is also called the "Pink City of Nepal" because the township was designed in 1938 based on influence from the "Indian Pink City" Jaipur - thus making it the first township in Nepal to receive urban planning. Rajbiraj is the district headquarters of Saptari, which was transferred from the old district headquarters Hanumannagar in 1944 and is the eighth largest city in the province. It was declared a municipality in 1959. According to the 2021 census, the city had a population of 70,803, making it the 77th largest municipality in Nepal. The city area is spread over 55.64 km^{2} (21.48 sq mi) and comprises 16 wards.

The city is named after the ancient temple of Rajdevi, rebuilt by the Sena kings in the early 14th century. Rajbiraj has prominently served as a politically active town in the modern history of Nepal and has been the hometown to a number of icons of the nation. Rajbiraj comes under the Saptari 2(B) assembly constituency, which elects a member to the Provincial Assembly of Madhesh Province once every five years, and it is a part of the Saptari 2 constituency, which elects its MP once in five years.

Roadways are the major mode of transportation to the town, but it also has air connectivity. The major trade routes to the town are offered by the Nepalese metropolis of Biratnagar situated 78 km (48 mi) east to the city as well as the Indo-Nepal border of Kunauli situated 10 km (6.2 mi) south to the city.

== History ==
=== Ancient Era ===
The city is part of the Mithila region which was an ancient kingdom which rose to prominence under King Janaka (c. 8th-7th centuries BCE). The city is historical twin city of Janakpur also known to be a seat of Kushadhwaja the brother of King Janka whose two daughters Mandavi and Shrutakirti were married to Bharata and Shatrughna respectively. Kushadhwaja later ruled the area through his ministers and moved to Sankasya. During the Medieval Period around 520 CE, King Salahesh reigned over Mithila region and made his capital near Lahan, 35 km west to Rajbiraj. The most powerful and prominent kingdom, Karnat dynasty came to power and ruled Mithila (also known as Tirhut) from the 11th century to the early 14th century. The fifth of karnat dynasty, Shaktisingh Dev (r. 1285 to 1295 CE) was travelled through this region after transferring his supremacy to his younger son Harisimhadeva and built the famous and ancient Chinnamasta Bhagawati Mandir as well as his fort nearby the temple, which is known as Gadhi Gaachhi locally. After the fall of Karnat dynasty, the Sena dynasty which was entered in Mithila, through Rupnagar from Bengal around early 13th century started ruling this region from the 15th century to the 18th century. The Rajdevi Temple was rebuilt by Sena king in the early 14th century and also known to be family temple of Kushadhwaja. Within the periphery of Rajbiraj, there were small shrines dedicated to Mandavi, Urmila and Shrutakirti but have been lost with time.

=== Modern Era ===
After the Treaty of Sugauli in 1816 the region become part of Kingdom of Nepal. Rajbiraj is one of the few cities given the status of municipality when Nepal's monarchy was restored in the 1950s. The first city of Nepal to be urban planned is rajbiraj. The Nepal government plans to develop it as a model city. Chief Engineer and Architect Dilli Jang Thapa designed Rajbiraj based on Indian city Jaipur. The city is now recognized as an educational capital of Eastern Nepal with various schools and colleges opening.

== Toponymy ==
The city of Rajbiraj is named after Rajdevi Temple. The Meaning of Raj comes from the name of the Rajdevi temple which means "state" and biraj means "to reside" or "to live".

== Demography ==
According to the National Population Census of 2021, Rajbiraj's population was 70,803, of which male and female are 36,284 and 34,519 respectively. The effective literacy rate was 76.60%, with male literacy at 85.30% and female literacy at 67.40%. The data on religion in 2011 showed Hinduism as the majority religion. Most people follow Hinduism as a religion. The Hindu population accounts for 87%, Muslim 10.89%, Jains 1.26% and Sikhs 0.64%. The city has also community of Muslims along with Sikhs, Jains and Buddhists. Rajbiraj is situated within one of the most ethnically diverse regions of Nepal, and the rural hinterland is home to a diverse cross section of Terai communities consisting of Kayastha, Deo, Yadav, Mandal, Muslim, Brahmin, Rajput, Marwari, Tharu, Badhai, Lohar, Sonar, Teli, Bania, Damai, Newar and Bahun.

Others include Christians, Buddhists & Other religions (0.19%)

Religion in Rajbiraj
Religion	Percent
Hinduism	87.01%
Islam	10.89%
Jain	1.26%
Sikh	0.64%
Others	0.20%

== Transport ==
=== Road ===
Rajbiraj is one of the cities in Nepal that is connected by the East West Highway about 10 kilometres (6 mi) to the north and 17 kilometres (11 mi) to the east also known as Hulaki Rajmarg. It is well connected to other Nepalese cities by National Highway and Sub Highway. Buses are an important mode of intercity passenger travel. Besides that, electric rickshaws and microvans are another important means of traveling in local areas.

=== Air ===
Rajbiraj has one of the oldest airfields of Nepal, named as the Rajbiraj Airport (IATA: RJB, ICAO: VNRB) which was inaugurated by the then transportation minister Ganesh Man Singh in 1959. After witnessing almost three decades of halt, the Civil Aviation Authority of Nepal carried out a series of vigorous renovation (worth Rs. 303 million) of the airport in the 1990s but the flights again had to be stopped in 2007. Shree Airlines 50-seater CRJ-200 was tested on 23 May 2018 with Captain DR Niroula of Shree's safety department along with other instructor pilots — Captain Prajwol Adhikari, Rajesh Shrestha. The halted flights of the airport were subsequently resumed from first 24 June 2018. As of February 2020, Buddha air aims to run daily flights in between Rajbiraj and Kathmandu.

=== Intracity ===
The best way of getting around the city is by using cycle rickshaws and electric rickshaws. There are also auto rickshaw running short distances but they don't operate in the main market area.

== Climate ==
Rajbiraj Municipal has particularly a tropical climate. The three main seasons, summer, monsoon and winter respectively. Being located in the Plain (Terai) lands of Nepal, the climate and weather of Rajbiraj is usually hot. The summer season runs from early April to August and touches temperature ranging from 23 °C (73 °F) to 44 °C (111 °F). Monsoons arrive in the month of July heralded by dust and thunderstorms. The winter season prevails from the month of October till the month of March. Humidity, which prevails during monsoons, diminishes at the arrival of winters. The city observes pleasant sunny days and enjoyable cool nights with the temperature ranging from 6 °C (41 °F) to 30 °C (86 °F).

Rajbiraj winter season is the most appealing time to pay here a visit. Tourists arrive in large numbers, anytime between mid-September to late March or early April. Overall, January is the coldest month and June is the most hottest month in the year.

Climate data for Rajbiraj (1991–2020 normals)
Month	Jan	Feb	Mar	Apr	May	Jun	Jul	Aug	Sep	Oct	Nov	Dec	Year
Mean daily maximum °C (°F)	22.4 (72.3)	25.5 (77.9)	31.7 (89.1)	34.6 (94.3)	34.3 (93.7)	33.9 (93.0)	32.9 (91.2)	33.3 (91.9)	33.2 (91.8)	32.4 (90.3)	29.7 (85.5)	25.0 (77.0)	30.7 (87.3)
Daily mean °C (°F)	16.1 (61.0)	19.0 (66.2)	24.2 (75.6)	28.0 (82.4)	29.0 (84.2)	29.5 (85.1)	29.1 (84.4)	29.6 (85.3)	29.1 (84.4)	27.1 (80.8)	22.9 (73.2)	18.1 (64.6)	25.1 (77.3)
Mean daily minimum °C (°F)	9.8 (49.6)	12.5 (54.5)	16.7 (62.1)	21.4 (70.5)	23.6 (74.5)	25.0 (77.0)	25.2 (77.4)	25.8 (78.4)	25.0 (77.0)	21.8 (71.2)	16.0 (60.8)	11.2 (52.2)	19.5 (67.1)
Average precipitation mm (inches)	12.3 (0.48)	11.5 (0.45)	12.2 (0.48)	44.1 (1.74)	120.9 (4.76)	258.0 (10.16)	460.4 (18.13)	300.7 (11.84)	232.6 (9.16)	76.9 (3.03)	7.7 (0.30)	10.5 (0.41)	1,547.8 (60.94)
Source 1: Department of Hydrology and Meteorology
Source 2: Agricultural Extension in South Asia (precipitation 1976–2005)

== Tourism ==
Rajbiraj is famous for agricultural products, spices and handicrafts. Mithila Paintings and Maithili culture is the main part of tourism to be explored. There are many religious Hindu temples to visit. Some of them are more than 2000 years old. The Koshi Tappu Wildlife Reserve famous for its wildlife is just 40-minute drive from the city. The Koshi Barrage is also the attraction which is only 25 km far from the city. The nearest inner-madhesh part includes Dharan (75 km) and Gaighat (60 km) far.

== Culture ==
=== Attire ===
The females are usually seen in the salwaar kameez and women are seen in the sarees. Males usually wear western garments like pants, shirts and T-shirts, rather than the traditional dhoti and kurtas, although males often wear traditional dress during Puja and festivals. Females are also gradually taking up more and more Western wear, with variety of jeans in the streets. There are fewer girls seen wearing T-skirts and Miniskirts predominating in the private schools, colleges and campuses. Younger females also seen wearing Lehenga in special occasion like wedding ceremony and festivals.

=== Religious Sites ===
Rajdevi Temple is a historic pre 14th century Hindu temple located on the east of the city and is one of the most prominent landmarks of the city. It is dedicated to the deity Rajdevi. The temple is a significant symbol for Hindus and the present structure was built between 1990. There are other Hindu temples in the city like Bhagwati Temple, Bageshwari Temple, Shree Radha Krishna Temple, Baishnavi Kali Mandir, Thangachi Mandir, Chitragupta Mandir where devotees come to offer prayer every day.

There is a Noori Jaama Masjid in the eastern central part of the town where Muslims congregate to perform Salat al-Jumu'ah.

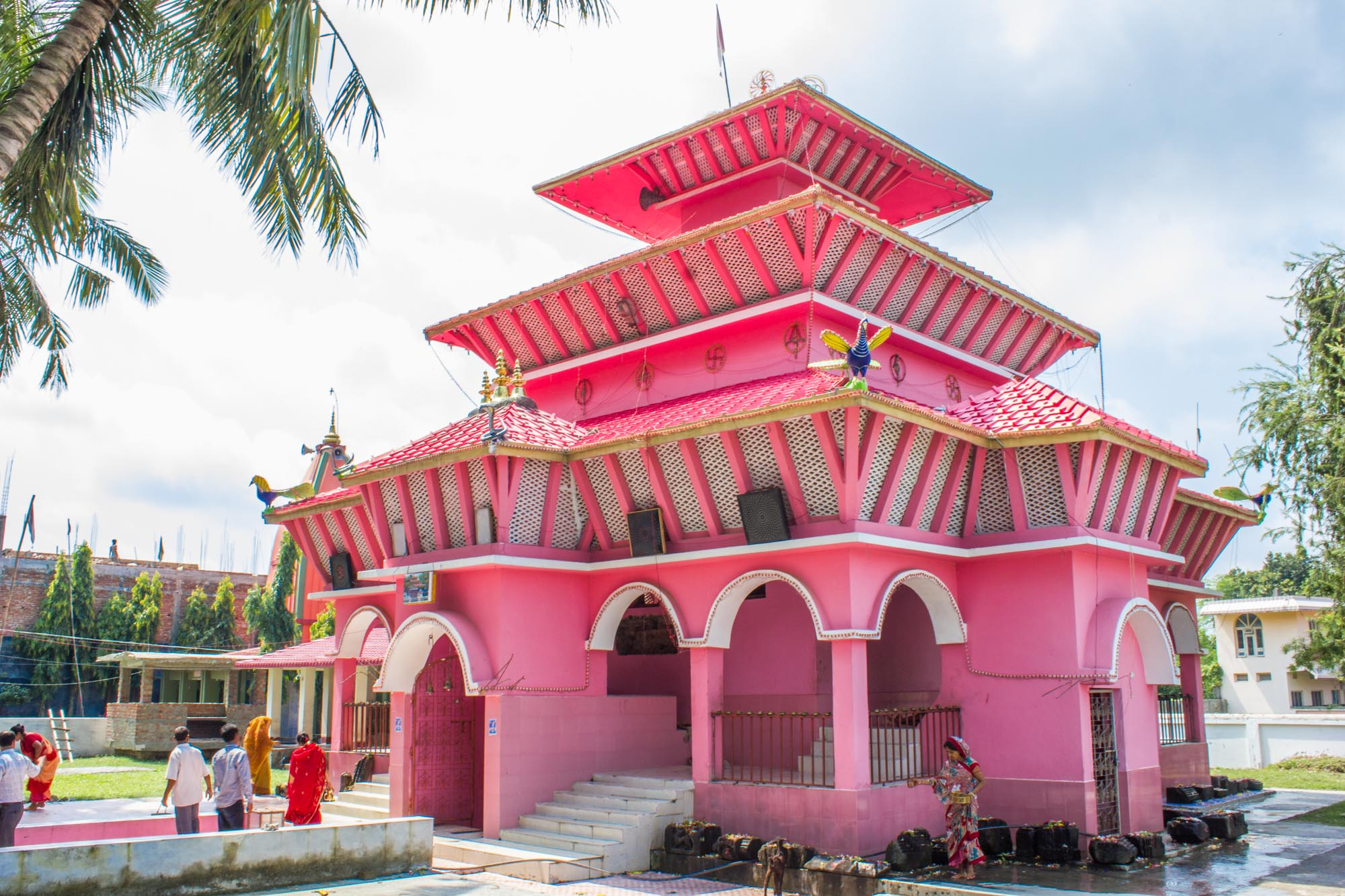
Rajdevi Temple

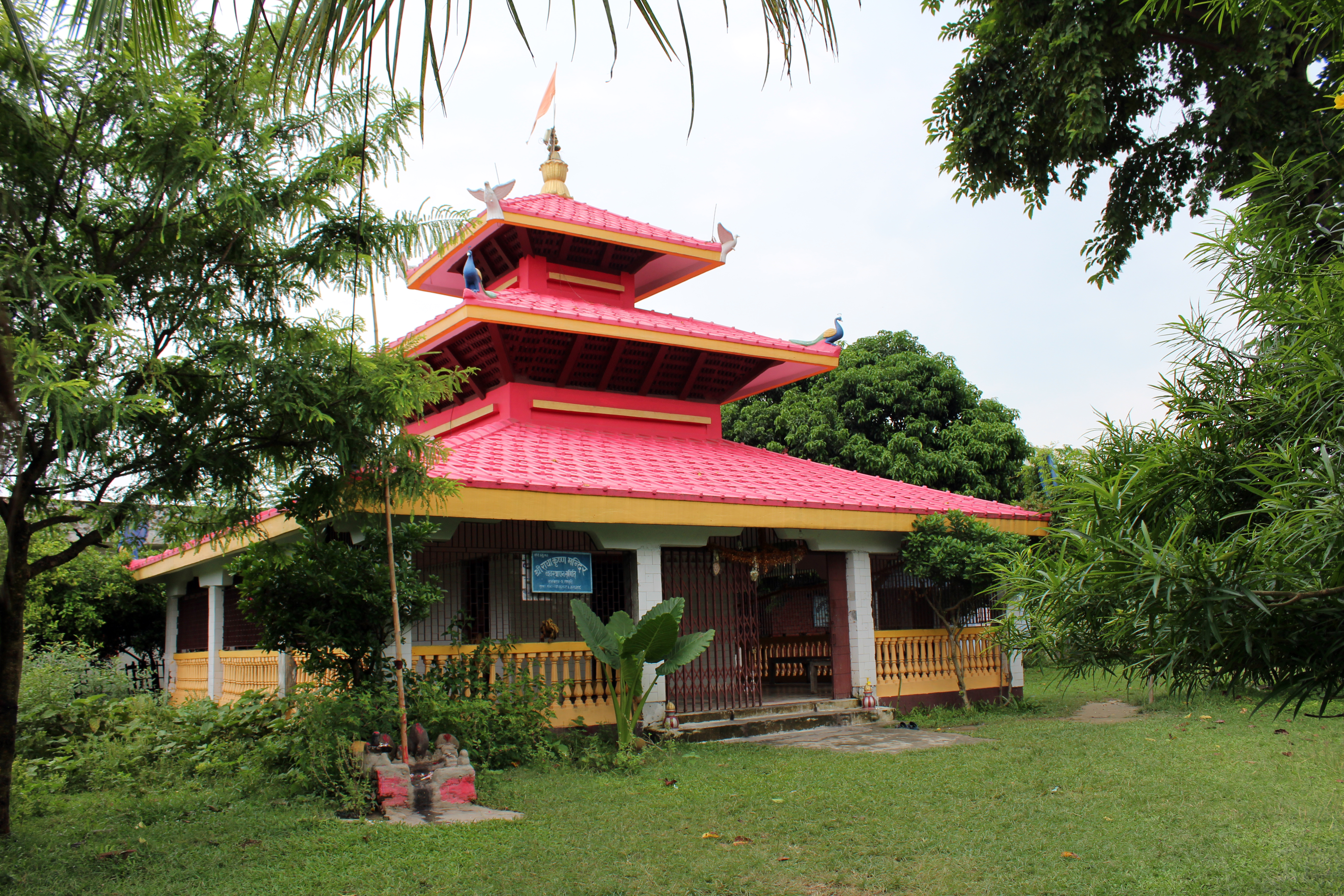
Shree Radha Krishna Temple

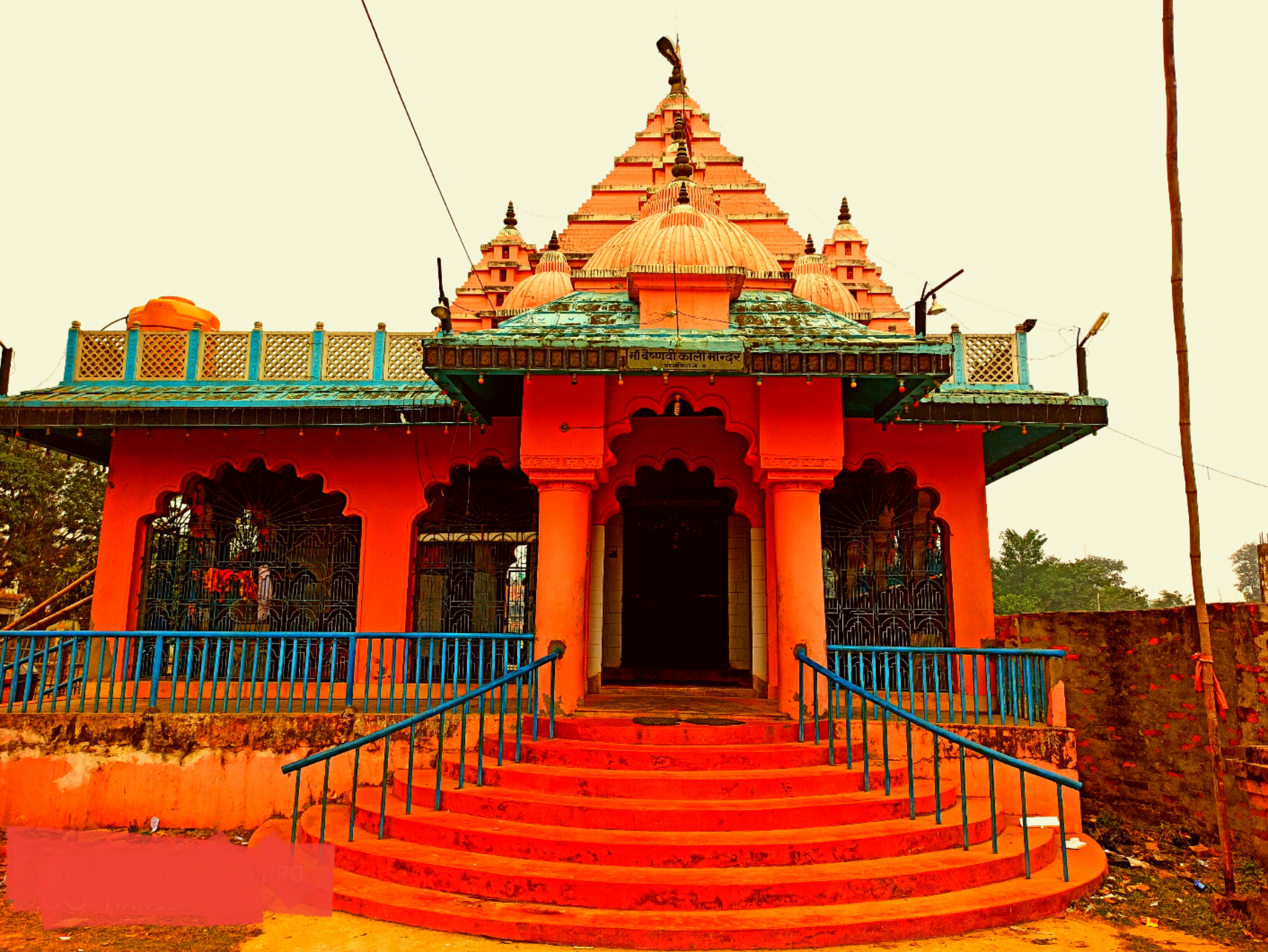
Baishnawi Kali Mandir

=== Architecture ===
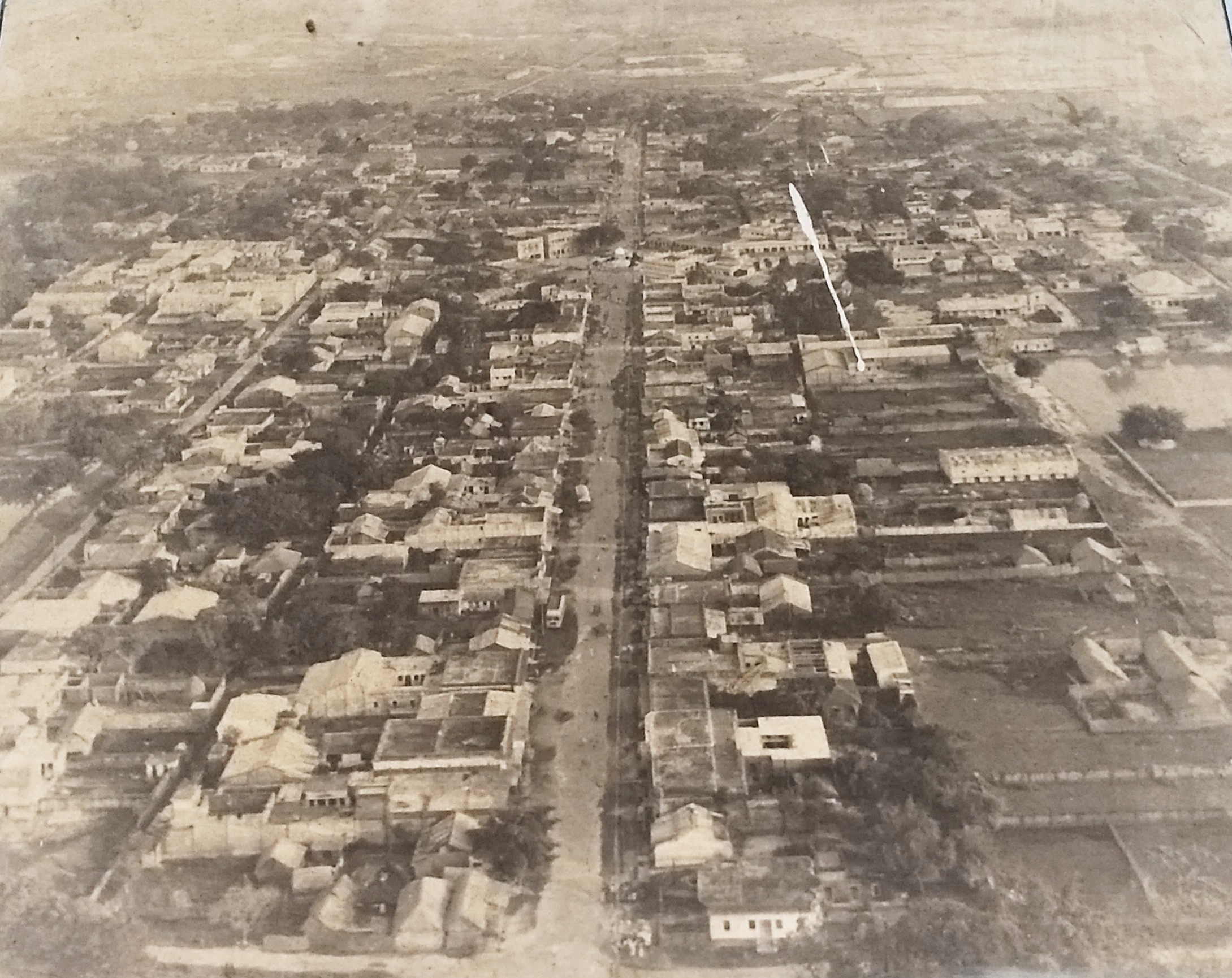
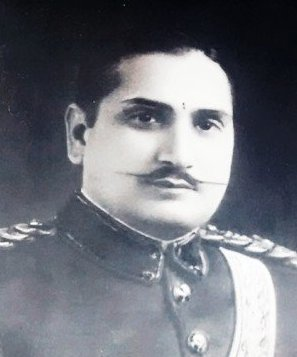
Aerial view of Rajbiraj in 1990 (left) and Portrait of chief engineer Dilli Jang Thapa (right)

The city was planned after the then headquarter of Saptari district Hanumannagar, which was heavily affected by the Saptakoshi river floods. In 1938–39, Baber Shamsher Jang Bahadur Rana, then head of the eastern command and his representative then Governor (Badahakim) Prakasha Shamser JB Rana justifies and approved Rajbiraj as the headquarter of Saptari district. Rajbiraj city was systematically designed based on the Indian city Jaipur by then chief architect and engineer Dilli Jung Thapa in 60 Bigha of land. There was dense jungle where fox roared before the proper inhabited took place. In 1941, the city gained the status of the headquarter of Saptari district and fully operational for inhabitant. Initially, the city was planned in 60 bigha of land but later 10 bigha of land was added to northern side for government office (Kachahari line) and 8 bigha of land in southern side was added to the city for the officials resident area (Swarna tol) making it in total 78 bigha of land. A small alley behind each of the four houses, Chauk square at the junction of main road and auxiliary road, grocery stores, vegetable market lines and government office buildings have been arranged in proper manner making it first planned city of Nepal.

=== Festivals ===
Major religious celebrations include the major Hindu festivals Vijaya Dashami, Dipawali, Chhath, Holi, Sama Chakeva and Vishwakarma Puja. The Chhath and Holi is heavily celebrated with a carnival-like atmosphere. The locals people take pride in the way these festivals are celebrated.

=== Cuisines ===
The staple diet of the region is rice, roti, achar, chatni, dal, saag, paneer, maachh, mutton and curry. On the festive occasions, people prepare a number of fried items of vegetables, locally known as Tarua as well as other special items. The local Maithili cuisine comprises a broad repertoire of rice, wheat, fish and meat dishes and the skilled use of various spices. The popular dishes includes Kadhi bari, Palak paneer, Khichdi, Aloo mutter, Dum Aloo, Mutton/Chicken Biryani and the desserts Khaja, Jalebi, Malpua, Rabri, Kheer, Thekua, Laddu and Gulab Jamun.

The commons dishes of the city is influenced with Maithil cuisine, Nepalese cuisine and Indian cuisine. Bagiya, Murhee ke laai (English: Puffed rice sweet balls), litti are also popular among people. Street foods such as Samosa, Chaat, Panipuri, Chow mein, Momo, Omelette and Sekuwa are favourite among Rajbirajians.

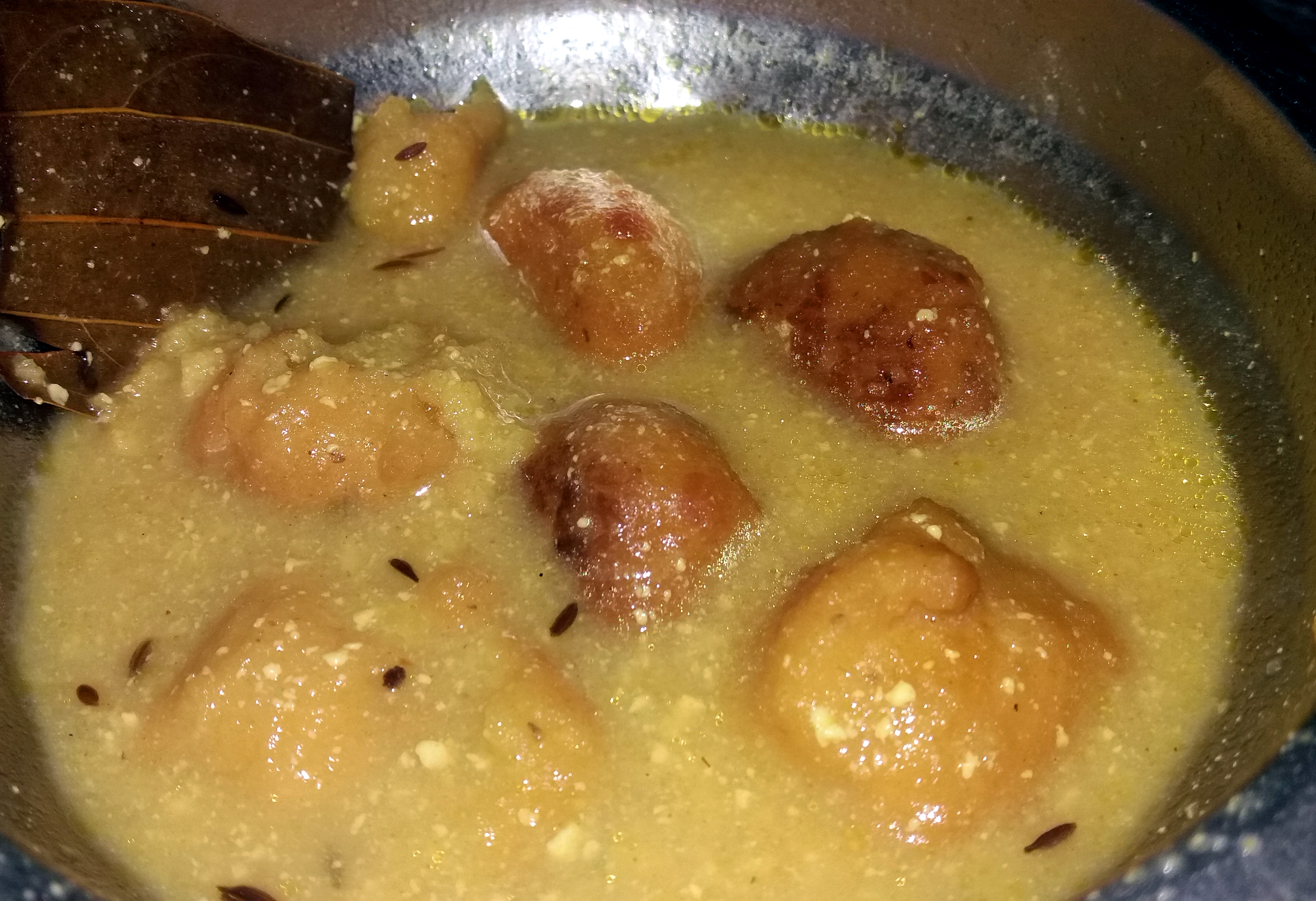
Kadhi bari

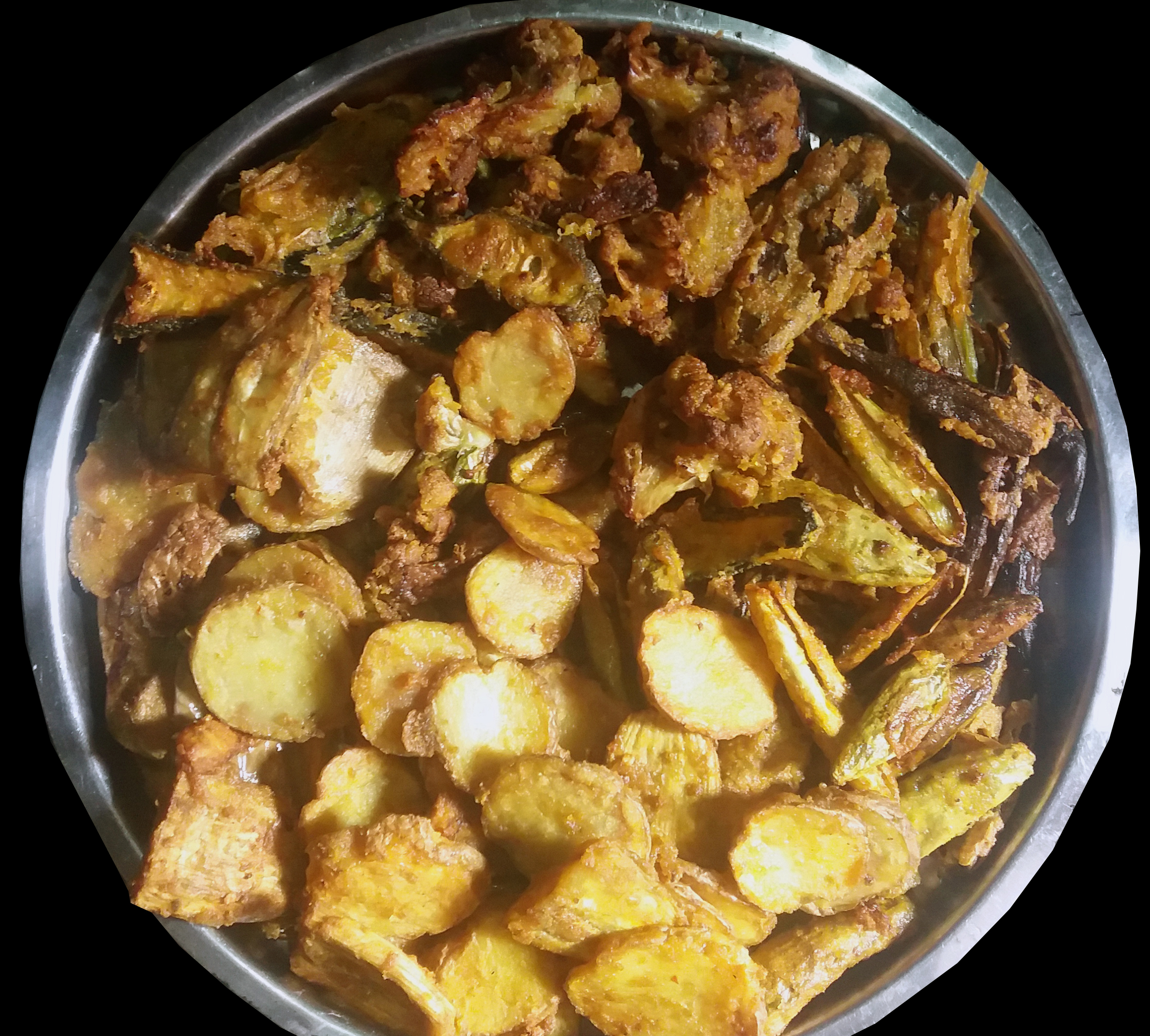
Varieties of Tarua

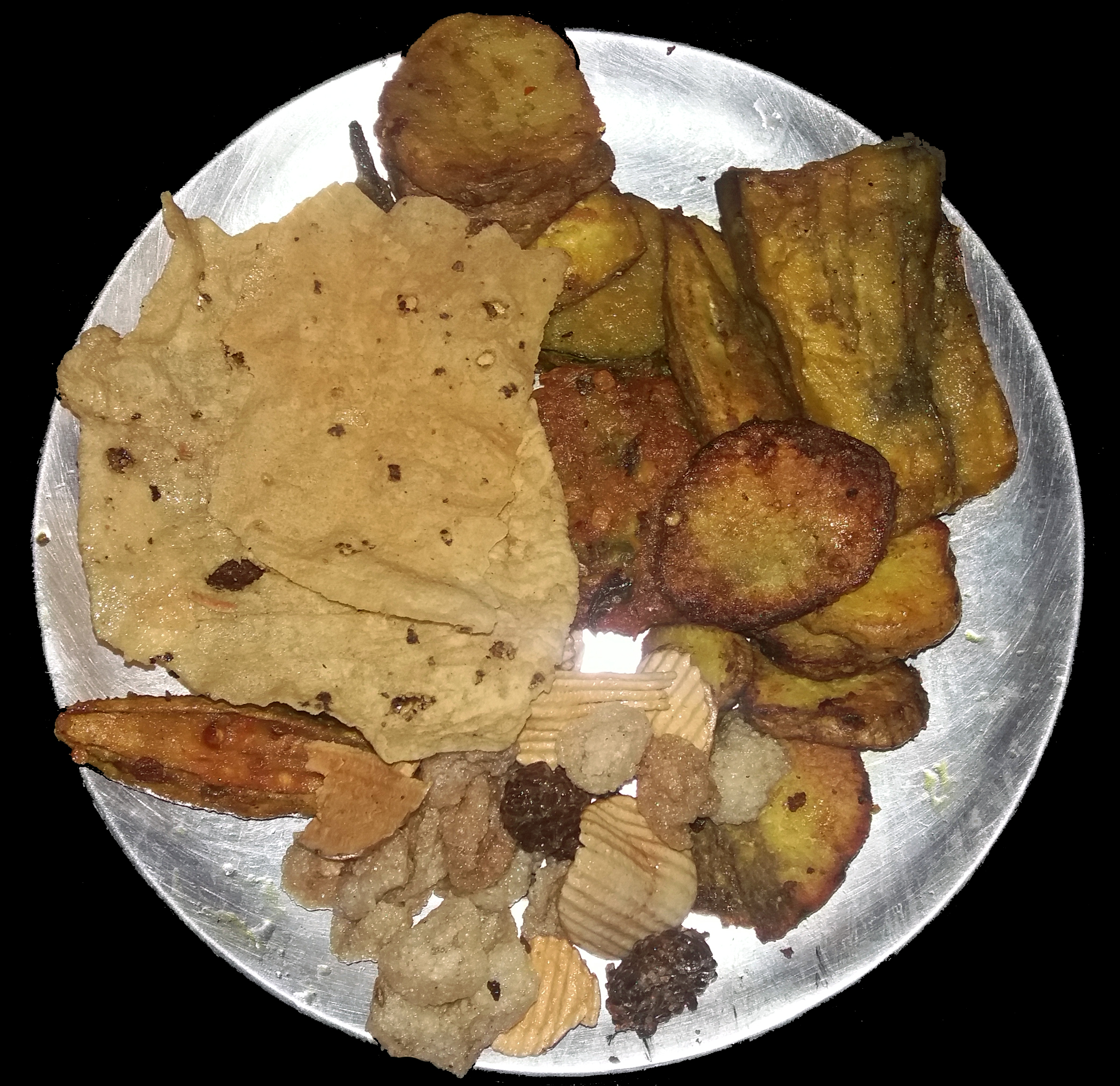
Varieties of Tarua and papad

=== Languages ===
The most commonly and widely speaking language of the city is Maithili. After Maithili, Nepali is also well understood and widely used for business and administrative purposes. Hindi is widely used by people from madhesh as a link language along with Marwari people and migrant workers from India. Historically, Rajbiraj was considered one of the great center of Mithila culture.

== Media ==
Print media include the National daily Annapurna Post, Gorkhapatra, Kantipur Patrika and Nepal Samacharpatra. There are numerous local newspaper which covers the news of the city like Nai Ummid, Rajbiraj Dainik, Krishna Dainik, News Today Patrika and Green Madhesh Patrika. while English news daily like The Himalayan Times and The Kathmandu Post are also available.

Telecommunications services include Nepal Telecom, Ncell, Smart Cell and UTL Nepal. WorldLink, Broadlink and Subisu are providing broadband services in this region. To promote local culture, Rajbiraj has number of FM radio stations which are:

- Bhorukuwa FM
- Chhinnamasta/Apan FM
- C FM
- Radio Chandrama FM
- Jai Madhesh FM
- Appan FM

== Educational institutions ==
Rajbiraj has a well-established education infrastructure. There are a number of colleges and schools meeting the requirements of not only the city but the region and country as well. It is home to several Educational institutions for pre-primary, Primary, Secondary, High-Secondary, senior-secondary, graduate and post-graduate studies. Rajbiraj is an educational hub of Eastern Region of Nepal.

== Hospitals ==
Following health services are available at Rajbiraj.

- Sagaramatha Zonal Hospital Gajendra Nr Singh Hospital
- Unique College of Medical Science and Hospital
- Sagarmatha Chaudhary Eye Hospital
- Ram Raja Prasad Singh Academy of Health Sciences
- Chhinnamasta Hospital
- Anar Bhupendra Hospital

== Sports ==
Kabaddi and Cricket are the most popular sports among the younger generation in the city. The city has 3 local stadiums. The sporting activities are mainly centered in the multipurpose stadium Raj Rangasala in the main city. The popular sports are cricket, football, volleyball, basketball, kabaddi, badminton etc. Freedom cricket club and Rajdevi cricket academy are the most active cricket club in the city. Mahendra Club is one of the most active organizations promoting football in the city and organizes a regional club-level football tournament: the Saptari Gold Cup.

== Notable people ==
- Mehboob Alam, Nepalese cricket player Cricket Association of Nepal, first bowler to take all ten wickets in an innings in an International Cricket Council tournament.
- Dipendra Chaudhary, former Nepalese cricket player
- Parmanand Jha, first Vice President of Nepal and former Supreme Court Judge
- CK Raut, President of Janamat Party
- Gajendra Narayan Singh, Founder of Nepal Sadbhawana Party, Nepal
- Ram Raja Prasad Singh, Politician
- Ramjee Yadav, Member of Parliament and Youth, Labour and Employment Minister
- Upendra Yadav, Founder of Federal Socialist Forum, Nepal, former Foreign Affairs and Health and Population Minister

== See also ==
- List of educational institutions in Rajbiraj
