= Limchungbung Rural Municipality =

Limchungbung लिम्चुङबुङ गाउँपालिका
- Rural Municipality
- Location in Koshi Province Limchungbung (Nepal)
- Coordinates: 27.13°N 86.60°E
- Province: Koshi Province
- District: Udayapur
- Established: 10 March 2017

Government
  - Chairperson: Mr. Mejar Kumar Rai (NCP)
  - Vice-chairperson: Mrs. Ramila Rai (NC)

Area
  - Total: 106.8 km^{2} (41.2 sq mi)

Population (2011)
  - Total: 11,992
  - Density: 112.3/km^{2} (290.8/sq mi)
- Time zone: UTC+5:45 (Nepal Standard Time)
- Pistal Code: 56300
- Area code: 035
- Headquarter: Baraha (The old office of Baraha Village Development Committee
- Website: official website

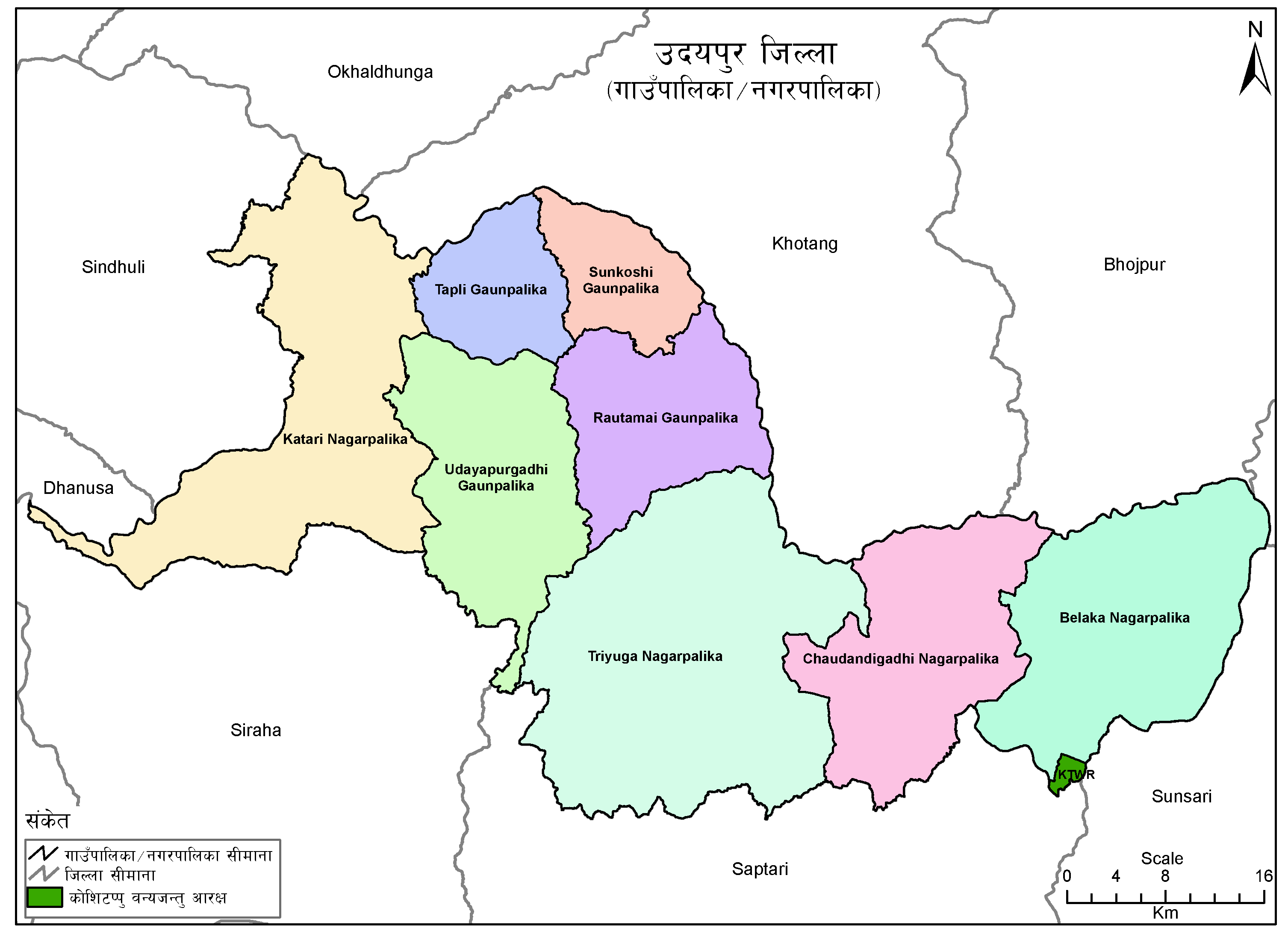
Sunkoshi

Limchungbung (Nepali: लिम्चुङबुङ गाउँपालिका) (earlier:Sunkoshi) is a rural municipality in Udayapur district of Koshi Province in Nepal. There are 4 rural municipalities in Udayapur district. There are 5 wards in this municipality. According to 2011 census of Nepal, the total population of the municipality is 11,992 and total area is 106.8 km². The headquarter of the municipality is in Baraha

The rural municipality was established on March 10, 2017 when Ministry of Federal Affairs and Local Development dissolved the existing village development committees and announced the establishment of this new local body.

Basabote, Tamlichha, Baraha, Balamta and Jante VDCs were merged to form the new rural municipality.

== See also ==
- Udayapurgadhi Rural Municipality
- Rautamai Rural Municipality
- Tapli Rural Municipality
