= Tapli Rural Municipality =

Tapli Gaunpalika ताप्ली गाउँपालिका
- Rural Municipality
- Location in Nepal
- Coordinates: 27.09°N 86.54°E
- Country: Nepal
- Province: Province No. 1
- District: Udayapur
- Established: 10 March 2017

Government
  - Type: Gaunpalika
  - Chairperson: Mr.Uddav Singh Thapa (NCP)
  - Vice-chairperson: Mrs.Kamalamaya Rai (NCP)

Area
  - Total: 119 km^{2} (46 sq mi)

Population (2011)
  - Total: 14 567
  - Density: 0.12/km^{2} (0.30/sq mi)
- Time zone: UTC+5:45 (Nepal Standard Time)
- Pistal Code: 56300
- Area code: 035
- Headquarter: Rupatar (The old office of Rupatar Village Development Committee
- Website: Official Website

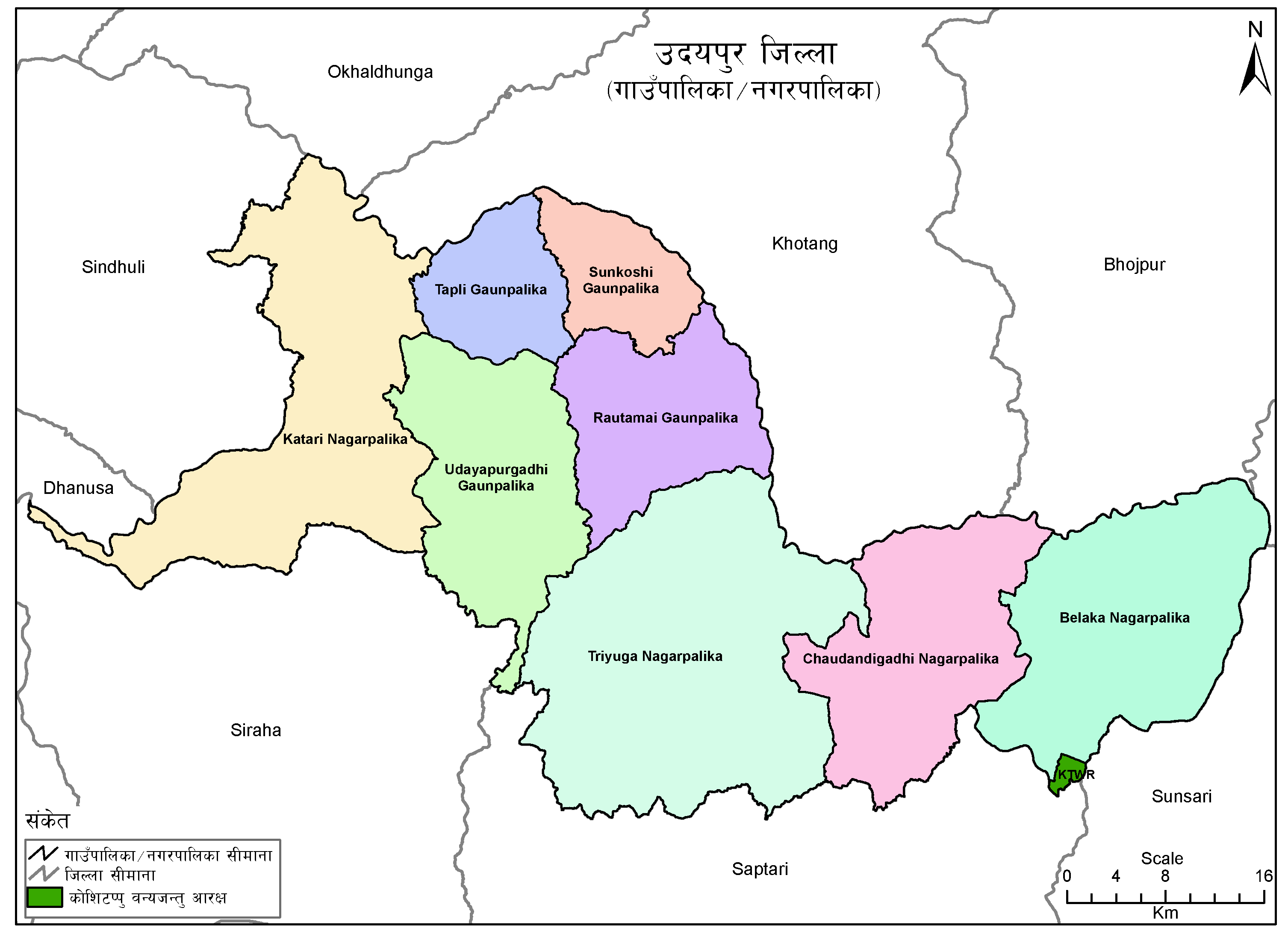
Tapli

Tapli Rural Municipality (Nepali: ताप्ली गाउँपालिका) is a rural municipality in Udayapur district of Province No. 1 in Nepal. There are 4 rural municipalities in Udayapur district. There are 5 wards in this municipality. According to 2011 census of Nepal, the total population of the municipality is 14,567 and total area is 119. km². The headquarter of the municipality is in Rupatar

The rural municipality was established on March 10, 2017 when Ministry of Federal Affairs and Local Development dissolved the existing village development committees and announced the establishment of this new local body.

Rupatar, Thanagaun, Iname, Okhale and Lekhgaun VDCs were merged to form the new rural municipality.

== See also ==
- Udayapurgadhi Rural Municipality
- Rautamai Rural Municipality
- Sunkoshi Rural Municipality
