= Udayapurgadhi Rural Municipality =

Udayapurgadhi Gaunpalika उदयपुरगढी गाउँपालिका
- Rural Municipality
- Location in Koshi Province Udayapurgadhi Gaunpalika (Nepal)
- Coordinates: 26°56′00″N 86°31′00″E
- Country: Nepal
- Province: Koshi Province
- District: Udayapur
- Wards: 8
- Established: 10 March 2017

Government
  - Type: Rural Council
  - Chairperson: Mr.Maan Bahadur Kepchaki Magar (CPN (US))
  - Vice-chairperson: Mrs.Sanu Raut (NCP)

Area
  - Total: 269.51 km^{2} (104.06 sq mi)

Population (2011)
  - Total: 30,731
  - Density: 114.03/km^{2} (295.32/sq mi)
- Time zone: UTC+5:45 (Nepal Standard Time)
- Pistal Code: 56300
- Area code: 035
- Headquarter: Panchawati (The old office of Panchawati Village Development Committee
- Website: Official Website

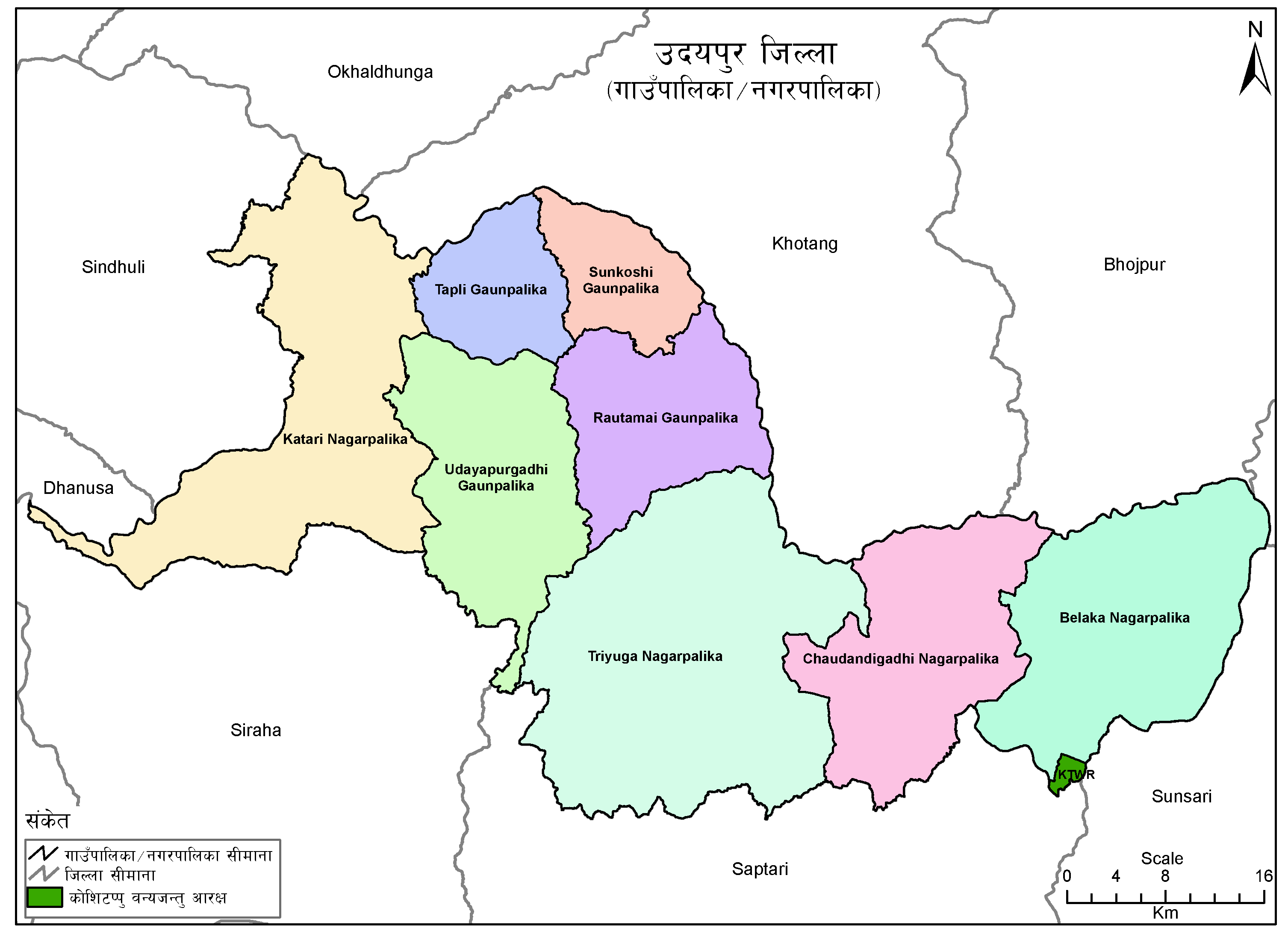

Udayapurgadhi Rural Municipality (Nepali: उदयपुरगढी गाउँपालिका) is a rural municipality in Udayapur District of Koshi Province in Nepal. There are 4 rural municipalities in Udayapur District. There are 8 wards in this municipality. According to 2011 census of Nepal, the total population of the municipality is 30,731 and total area is 269.51 km². The headquarter of the municipality is in Panchawati

The rural municipality was established on March 10, 2017 when Ministry of Federal Affairs and Local Development dissolved the existing village development committees and announced the establishment of this new local body.

Panchawati, Bhalayadanda, Tawasri, Dumre and Barre VDCs were merged to form the new rural municipality.

== Demographics ==
At the time of the 2011 Nepal census, Udayapurgadhi Rural Municipality had a population of 30,780. Of these, 48.0% spoke Nepali, 26.8% Magar, 16.3% Tamang, 3.8% Rai, 3.1% Chamling, 0.7% Newar, 0.2% Maithili, 0.2% Sherpa, 0.2% Sunwar, 0.1% Wambule and 0.2% other languages as their first language.

In terms of ethnicity/caste, 28.8% were Magar, 17.3% Tamang, 15.8% Chhetri, 10.1% Rai, 6.6% Kami, 5.3% Hill Brahmin, 3.9% Sarki, 3.8% Damai/Dholi, 3.4% Newar, 1.9% Sanyasi/Dasnami, 1.5% Gharti/Bhujel, 0.5% Sunuwar, 0.3% Thakuri, 0.2% Gurung, 0.2% Sherpa, 0.1% Musalman, 0.1% Yadav and 0.4% others.

In terms of religion, 63.9% were Hindu, 28.5% Buddhist, 3.6% Kirati, 3.5% Christian, 0.1% Muslim and 0.4% others.

In terms of literacy, 64.6% could read and write, 3.5% could only read and 31.8% could neither read nor write.

Ward distribution
Wards	Village	Nepali	Population (2011)	Area (km^{2})
1	Bwanse	ब्वाँसे	4,350	33.45
2	Mansintar Ghata	मान्सिनटार घटा	2,706	16.6
3	Jaruwa	जरुवा	3,176	30.87
4	Dumre	डुम्रे	2,357	22.44
5	Udayapurgadhi	उदयपुरगढी	4,374	36.3
6	Nepaltar	नेपालटार	4,908	46.29
7	Hadebas	हाडेबास	5,070	46.09
8	Naretar	नारेटार	3,790	37.46
	Udayapurgadhi	उदयपुरगढी	30,731	269.5

== See also ==
- Sunkoshi Rural Municipality
- Rautamai Rural Municipality
- Tapli Rural Municipality
