= Surya Bahadur Tamang =

Nepalese politician

Honourable Surya Bahadur Tamang
- सूर्यबहादुर तामाङ

Member of Parliament, Pratinidhi Sabha
- Incumbent
- Assumed office 26 March 2026
- Preceded by: Ambar Bahadur Rayamajhi
- Constituency: Udayapur 2

Personal details
- Born: 23 January 1985 (age 41) Katari, Udayapur, Nepal
- Citizenship: Nepalese
- Party: Rastriya Swatantra Party (since 2022)
- Spouse: Tabita Rai
- Parent: Padam Bahadur Tamang (father)
- Profession: Politician; Entrepreneur

Surya Bahadur Tamang (Nepali: सुर्यबहादुर तामाङ) is a Nepalese politician and an entrepreneur. He currently serves as a member of parliament for the Rastriya Swatantra Party. He is a member of the 7th Pratinidhi Sabha, elected from the Udayapur 2 constituency in the 2026 Nepalese General Election, securing 14,802 votes and defeating Ambar Bahadur Rayamajhi of the CPN (UML).

== Early and personal life ==
Tamang was born in Katari, Udayapur on January 23, 1985. He was born to Padam Bahadur Tamang.He is married to Tabita Rai.

== Politics ==
He joined Rastriya Swatantra Party in 2022. The Rastriya Swatantra Party designated him as a member of parliament to contest the 2026 Nepalese general election from Udayapur 2. He filed his candidacy nomination on January 21, 2026. He secured victory by receving a total of 14,802 votes, surpassing his fellow competitors, former MP Ambar Bahadur Rayamajhi of the CPN (UML) finished second with 7,648 votes, while Ram Kumar Rai of the Nepali Congress came in third with 7,290 votes.

== Electoral performance ==
Election	Year	Constituency	Contested for	Political party	Result	Votes	% of votes	Ref.
Nepal general election	2026	Udayapur 2	Pratinidhi Sabha member	Rastriya Swatantra Party	Won	14,802	36.32%	
