= Siddhicharan Highway =

Highway in Nepal

Siddhicharan Highway सिद्धिचरण राजमार्ग
- राष्ट्रिय राजमार्ग २०
- National Highway 20
- NH20 in red

Route information
- Maintained by MoPIT (Department of Roads)
- Length: 193 km (120 mi)

Major junctions
- South end: Madar
- Choharwa, Mirchaiya, Katari, Okhaldhunga
- North end: Salleri

Location
- Country: Nepal
- Provinces: Madhesh Province, Koshi Province
- Districts: Siraha District, Udayapur District, Okhaldhunga District, Solukhumbu District

Highway system
- Roads in Nepal
← NH19	→ NH21

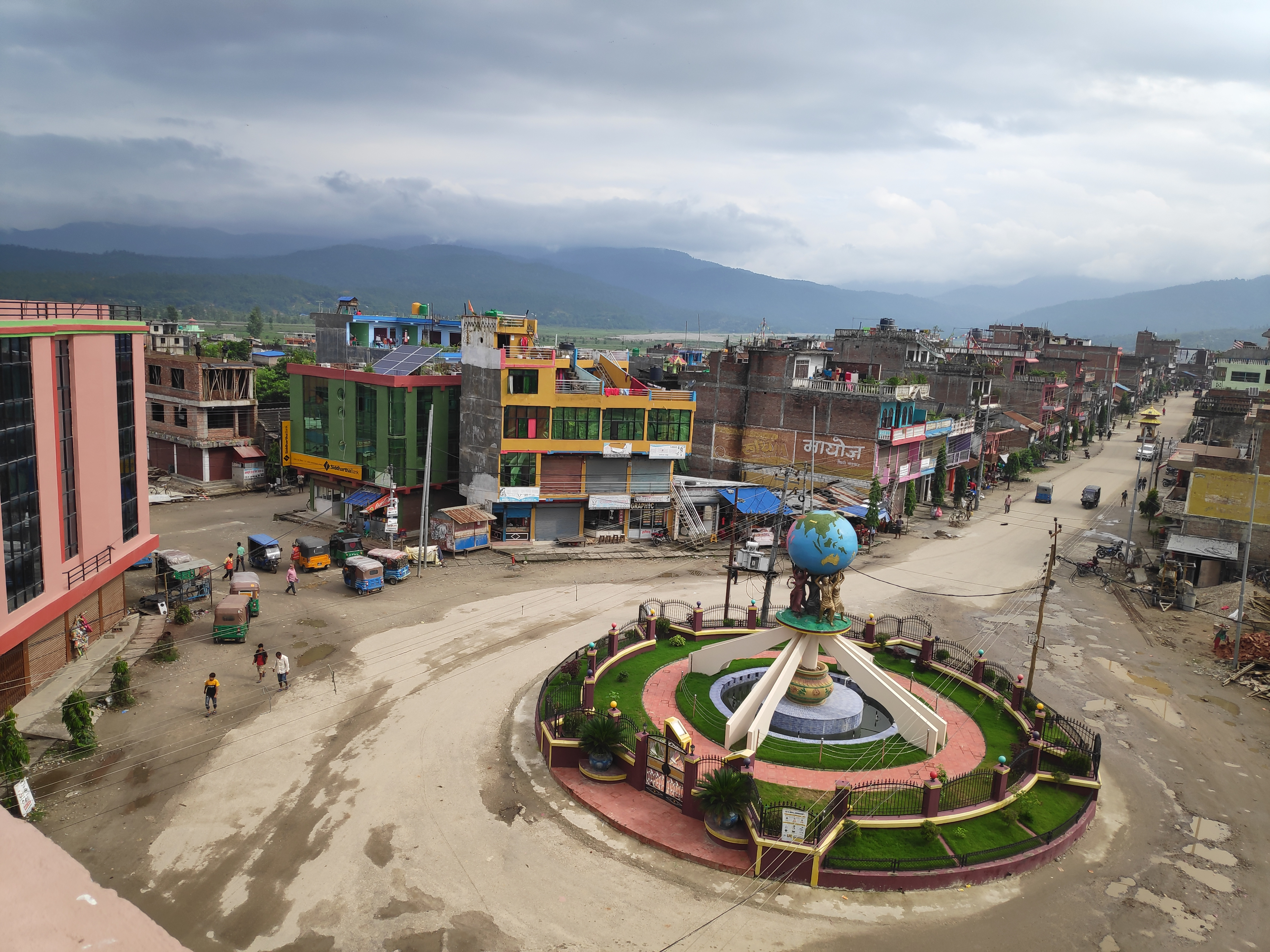
Bhugol Park a part of Siddhicharan Highway (NH20) in Katari, Udayapur, Nepal

Siddhicharan Highway (NH20) (Nepali: सिद्धिचरण राजमार्ग) is a National Highway of Nepal located between Madhesh Province and Koshi Province. The total length of the highway is 193 kilometres (120 mi) which passes through Siraha District of Madhesh Province and Udayapur District, Okhaldhunga District, Solukhumbu District of Koshi Province.

It starts in Terai region at Madar (Indo-Nepal border) and crosses NH01 (Mahendra Highway) in Mirchaiya Municipality and runs towards north where it passes through Sivalik Hills and enters in Inner Terai valley in Katari Municipality, at there it crosses NH09 (Madan Bhandari Inner Terai Highway) then it moves further north climbing Mahabharat Range or Lesser Himalayas where it crosses NH03 (Mid-Hills Highway and enters hilly town Okhaldhunga of Siddhicharan Municipality. It crosses NH75 at Okhaldhunga and runs further North towards Salleri. The distance between Okhaldhunga to Salleri is 57.7 kilometres (35.9 mi).

== Highway sections ==
Highway Details
Highway No.	Highway Link	Destinations (between)	Distance (KM)	Elevation (M)
NH20	NH20-001	Madar-Siraha	08.45	94
NH20	NH20-002	Siraha-Chauharwa	18.21	155
NH20	NH01-018	Chauharwa-Mirchaiya	05.15	134
NH20	NH20-003	Mirchaiya-Jyamire	07.00	322
NH20	NH20-004	Jyamire-Katari	20.00	218
NH20	NH20-005	Katari-Ghurmi	48.47	442
NH20	NH03-017	Ghurmi-Hilepani	07.00	390
NH20	NH20-006	Hilepani-Okhaldhunga	35.20	1822
NH20	NH20-007	Okhaldhunga-Mudhe Bisana	20.71	3000
NH20	NH20-008	Mudhe Bisana-Salleri	37.00	2493

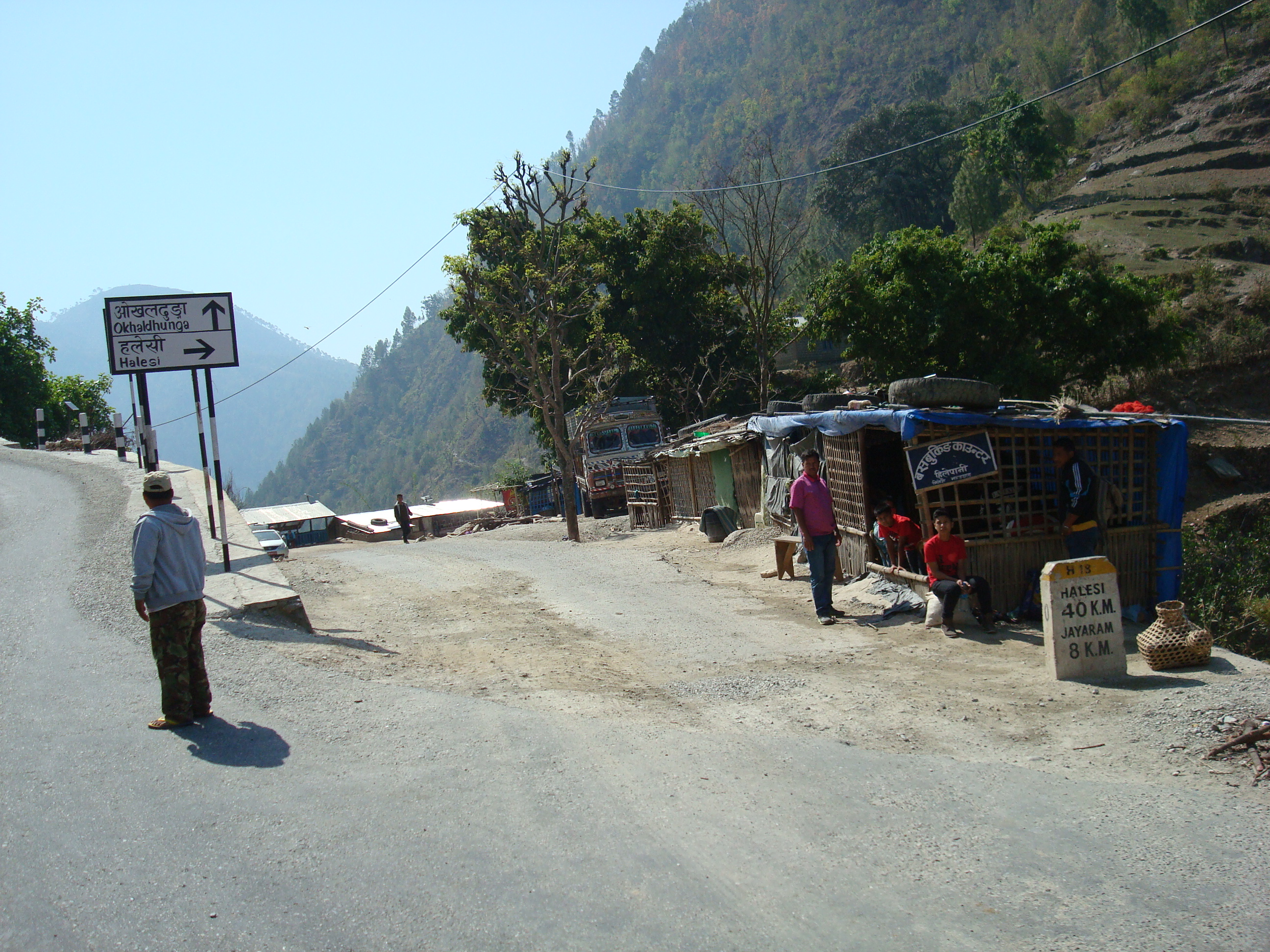
Hilepani Junction (elevation:1822m), road going down towards Halesi is NH03 Madan Bhandari Inner Terai Highway and road going up towards Okhaldhunga is NH20
