= Baraha (disambiguation) =

Baraha may refer to:

- Baraha, word processing software for Indian languages
- Baraha, Bheri, a village in western-central Nepal
- Baraha, Sagarmatha, a village in south-eastern Nepal
- Saadat-e-Bara or Baraha, a community of Sayyids in Uttar Pradesh, India
