= Udayapur 2 =

Parliamentary constituency in Nepal

- Parliamentary constituency
- Udayapur 2 in Province No. 1
- Province: Province No. 1
- District: Udayapur District

Current constituency
- Created: 1991
- Party: Rastriya Swatantra Party
- Member of Parliament: Surya Bahadur Tamang
- Member of the Provincial Assembly: Narayan Bahadur Magar, CPN (MC)
- Member of the Provincial Assembly: Kala Ghale, CPN (UML)

Udayapur 2 is one of two parliamentary constituencies of Udayapur District in Nepal. This constituency came into existence on the Constituency Delimitation Commission (CDC) report submitted on 31 August 2017.

== Incorporated areas ==
Udayapur 2 incorporates Belaka Municipality, Chaudandhigadhi Municipality and Triyuga Municipality.

== Assembly segments ==
It encompasses the following Province No. 1 Provincial Assembly segment

- Udayapur 2(A)
- Udayapur 2(B)

== Members of Parliament ==
=== Parliament/Constituent Assembly ===
Election	Member	Party
1991	Bishnu Bahadur Raut	CPN (Unified Marxist–Leninist)
1999	Jagannath Khatiwada	CPN (Unified Marxist–Leninist)
2008	Mani Kirati	CPN (Maoist)
January 2009	Mani Kirati	UCPN (Maoist)
2013	Manju Kumari Chaudhary	CPN (Unified Marxist–Leninist)
2017	Suresh Kumar Rai	CPN (Maoist Centre)
May 2018	Suresh Kumar Rai	Nepal Communist Party
2022	Ambar Bahadur Rayamajhi	CPN (Unified Marxist-Leninist)
2026	Surya Bahadur Tamang	Rastriya Swatantra Party

=== Provincial Assembly ===
==== 2(A) ====
Election	Member	Party
2017	Narayan Bahadur Magar	Independent
2018	Narayan Bahadur Magar	CPN (Maoist Centre)
May 2018	Narayan Bahadur Magar	Nepal Communist Party

==== 2(B) ====
Election	Member	Party
2017	Suresh Kumar Rai	CPN (Unified Marxist-Leninist)
May 2018	Suresh Kumar Rai	Nepal Communist Party
2022	Ram Kumar Khatri	Nepali Congress

== Election results ==
=== Election in the 2020s ===
==== 2026 general election ====
Candidate	Party	Votes	%
Surya Bahadur Tamang	Rastriya Swatantra Party	14,802	36.32
Ambar Bahadur Rayamajhi	CPN (UML)	7,648	18.77
Ram Kumar Rai	Nepali Congress	7,290	17.89
Suresh Kumar Rai	Nepali Communist Party	5,197	12.75
Others		5,819	14.28
Total		40,756	100.00
Valid votes		40,756	91.31
Invalid/blank votes		3,878	8.69
Total votes		44,634	100.00
Registered voters/turnout		96,122	46.43
Majority		7,154	
Rastriya Swatantra Party gain			
Source: Election Commission of Nepal and Nagarik News

==== 2022 general election ====
Candidate	Party	Votes	%
Ambar Bahadur Rayamajhi	CPN (UML)	15,251	36.17
Jagannath Khatiwada	CPN (Unified Socialist)	12,893	30.58
Ram Kumar Rai	Independent	10,379	24.62
Bhaskar Rai	Mongol National Organisation	1,430	3.39
Others		2,208	5.24
Total		42,161	100.00
Majority		2,358	
CPN (UML)			

=== Election in the 2010s ===
==== 2017 legislative elections ====
Party	Candidate	Votes
CPN (Maoist Centre)	Suresh Kumar Rai	22,551
Nepali Congress	Narayan Bahadur Karki	15,455
Federal Socialist Forum, Nepal	Bishnu Bahadur Rai Danuwar	1,136
Others		988
Invalid votes		1,077
Result	Maoist Centre gain	
Source: Election Commission

==== 2017 Nepalese provincial elections ====
===== 2(A) =====
Party	Candidate	Votes
Independent	Narayan Bahadur Magar	9,870
Nepali Congress	Bhesh Raj Thapa Magar	5,934
Others		1,207
Invalid votes		959
Result	Independent gain	
Source: Election Commission

===== 2(B) =====
Party	Candidate	Votes
CPN (Unified Marxist-Leninist)	Kala Ghale	13,459
Nepali Congress	Ram Kumar Khatri	8,976
Others		1,285
Invalid votes		1,169
Result	CPN (UML) gain	
Source: Election Commission

==== 2013 Constituent Assembly election ====
Party	Candidate	Votes
CPN (Unified Marxist–Leninist)	Manju Kumari Chaudhary	7,534
Nepali Congress	Pramila Rai	7,511
Rastriya Prajatantra Party	Hari Bahadur Basnet	6,260
UCPN (Maoist)	Suresh Kumar Rai	6,006
Federal Socialist Party, Nepal	Sidhhant Rai	1,054
Others		2,670
Result	CPN (UML) gain	
Source: NepalNews

=== Election in the 2000s ===
==== 2008 Constituent Assembly election ====
Party	Candidate	Votes
CPN (Maoist)	Mani Kirati	13,598
CPN (Unified Marxist–Leninist)	Baldev Chaudhary	11,921
Nepali Congress	Bidur Basnet	10,005
Others		2,663
Invalid votes		2,182
Result	Maoist gain	
Source: Election Commission

=== Election in the 1990s ===
==== 1999 legislative elections ====
Party	Candidate	Votes
CPN (Unified Marxist–Leninist)	Jagannath Khatiwada	18,258
Nepali Congress	Herambh Bahadur Thapa	15,833
Rastriya Prajatantra Party	Bhakta Bahadur SIngh Thakurai	2,420
CPN (Marxist–Leninist)	Bharat Kumar Thapa	1,938
Rastriya Janamukti Party	Prem Bahadur Magar	1,238
Others		578
Invalid Votes		1,354
Result	CPN (UML) hold	
Source: Election Commission

==== 1994 legislative elections ====
Party	Candidate	Votes
CPN (Unified Marxist–Leninist)	Bishnu Bahadur Raut	14,261
Nepali Congress	Herambh Bahadur Thapa	12,784
Rastriya Prajatantra Party	Bhakta Bahadur Singh	4,161
Rastriya Janamukti Party	Ratna Bahadur Rai	1,029
Others		952
Result	CPN (UML) hold	
Source: Election Commission

==== 1991 legislative elections ====
Party	Candidate	Votes
CPN (Unified Marxist–Leninist)	Bishnu Bahadur Raut	14,164
Nepali Congress	Arjun Kumar Khadka	12,788
Result	CPN (UML) gain	

== See also ==
- List of parliamentary constituencies of Nepal
