= Udayapur 1 =

Parliamentary constituency in Nepal

- Parliamentary constituency
- Udayapur 1 in Province No. 1
- Province: Province No. 1
- District: Udayapur District

Current constituency
- Created: 1991
- Party: Rastriya Swatantra Party
- Member of Parliament: Paras Mani Gelal
- Member of the Provincial Assembly: Bimal Karki, CPN (UML)
- Member of the Provincial Assembly: Himal Karki, NC

Udayapur 1 is one of two parliamentary constituencies of Udayapur District in Nepal. This constituency came into existence on the Constituency Delimitation Commission (CDC) report submitted on 31 August 2017.

== Incorporated areas ==
Udayapur 1 incorporates Belaka Municipality, Chaudandhigadhi Municipality and Triyuga Municipality.

== Assembly segments ==
It encompasses the following Province No. 1 Provincial Assembly segment

- Udayapur 1(A)
- Udayapur 1(B)

== Members of Parliament ==
=== Parliament/Constituent Assembly ===
Election	Member	Party
1991	Laxmi Narayan Chaudhary	CPN (Unified Marxist–Leninist)
1999	Suresh Kumar Rai	CPN (Unified Marxist–Leninist)
2008	Narayan Khadka	Nepali Congress
2082	Paras Mani Gelal	Rastriya Swatantra Party

=== Provincial Assembly ===
==== 1(A) ====
Election	Member	Party
2017	Bimal Karki	CPN (Unified Marxist-Leninist)
May 2018	Bimal Karki	Nepal Communist Party

==== 1(B) ====
Election	Member	Party
2017	Himal Karki	Nepali Congress

== Election results ==
=== Election in the 2020s ===
==== 2022 general election ====
Candidate	Party	Votes	%
Narayan Khadka	Nepali Congress	31,270	43.76
Manju Kumari Chaudhary	CPN (UML)	28,891	40.43
Dhurba Kumar Rayamajhi	Rastriya Prajatantra Party	3,915	5.48
Uddhav Adhikari	Rastriya Swatantra Party	3,444	4.82
Gopal Rai	People's Socialist Party, Nepal	1,906	2.67
Others		2,029	2.84
Total		71,455	100.00
Majority		2,379	
Nepali Congress hold			

=== Election in the 2010s ===
==== 2017 legislative elections ====
Party	Candidate	Votes
Nepali Congress	Narayan Khadka	33,142
CPN (Unified Marxist–Leninist)	Manju Kumari Chaudhary	32,594
CPN (Marxist–Leninist)	Ram Prasad Chaulagain	1,295
Federal Socialist Forum, Nepal	Gopal Rai	1,196
Others		988
Invalid votes		4,889
Result	Congress hold	
Source: Election Commission

==== 2017 Nepalese provincial elections ====
===== 1(A) =====
Party	Candidate	Votes
CPN (Unified Marxist–Leninist)	Bimal Karki	17,501
Nepali Congress	Bidur Basnet	15,844
Federal Socialist Forum, Nepal	Ganesh Kumar Rai	1,545
Others		1,522
Invalid votes		2,218
Result	CPN (UML) gain	
Source: Election Commission

===== 1(B) =====
Party	Candidate	Votes
Nepali Congress	Himal Karki	16,792
CPN (Maoist Centre)	Ram Bahadur Thapa Magar	15,194
Others		1,939
Invalid votes		1,434
Result	Congress gain	
Source: Election Commission

==== 2013 Constituent Assembly election ====
Party	Candidate	Votes
Nepali Congress	Narayan Khadka	15,381
CPN (Unified Marxist–Leninist)	Mani Raj Upadhyaya Paudel	7,298
UCPN (Maoist)	Rajan Kirati	6,648
Federal Socialist Party, Nepal	Pradeep Kumar Chaudhary	2,416
Others		2,749
Result	Congress hold	
Source: NepalNews

=== Election in the 2000s ===
==== 2008 Constituent Assembly election ====
Party	Candidate	Votes
Nepali Congress	Dr. Narayan Khadka	14,468
CPN (Maoist)	Rajan Kirati	13,236
CPN (Unified Marxist–Leninist)	Ashok Kumar Rai	9,810
Nepal Loktantrik Samajbadi Dal	Chandra Hansa Chaudhary	1,198
Others		1,448
Invalid votes		2,115
Result	Congress gain	
Source: Election Commission

=== Election in the 1990s ===
==== 1999 legislative elections ====
Party	Candidate	Votes
CPN (Unified Marxist–Leninist)	Suresh Kumar Rai	17,686
Nepali Congress	Dr. Narayan Khadka	16,847
Rastriya Prajatantra Party	Hari Bahadur Basnet	11,046
CPN (Marxist–Leninist)	Ashok Kumar Rai	8,356
Others		2,297
Invalid Votes		1,403
Result	CPN (UML) hold	
Source: Election Commission

==== 1994 legislative elections ====
Party	Candidate	Votes
CPN (Unified Marxist–Leninist)	Laxmi Narayan Chaudhary	19,290
Nepali Congress	Ashok Chandra Rai	12,625
Rastriya Prajatantra Party	Hari Bahadur Basnet	5,829
CPN (Marxist)	Bhim Kumar Rai	2,131
Rastriya Janamukti Party	Krishna Bahadur Rai	1,075
Others		431
Result	CPN (UML) hold	
Source: Election Commission

==== 1991 legislative elections ====
Party	Candidate	Votes
CPN (Unified Marxist–Leninist)	Laxmi Narayan Chaudhary	20,413
Nepali Congress	Satya Narayan Chaudhary	12,051
Result	CPN (UML) gain	

== See also ==
- List of parliamentary constituencies of Nepal
