= Belaka Municipality =

Municipality in Koshi Province, Nepal

Belaka Municipality बेलका नगरपालिका
- Municipality
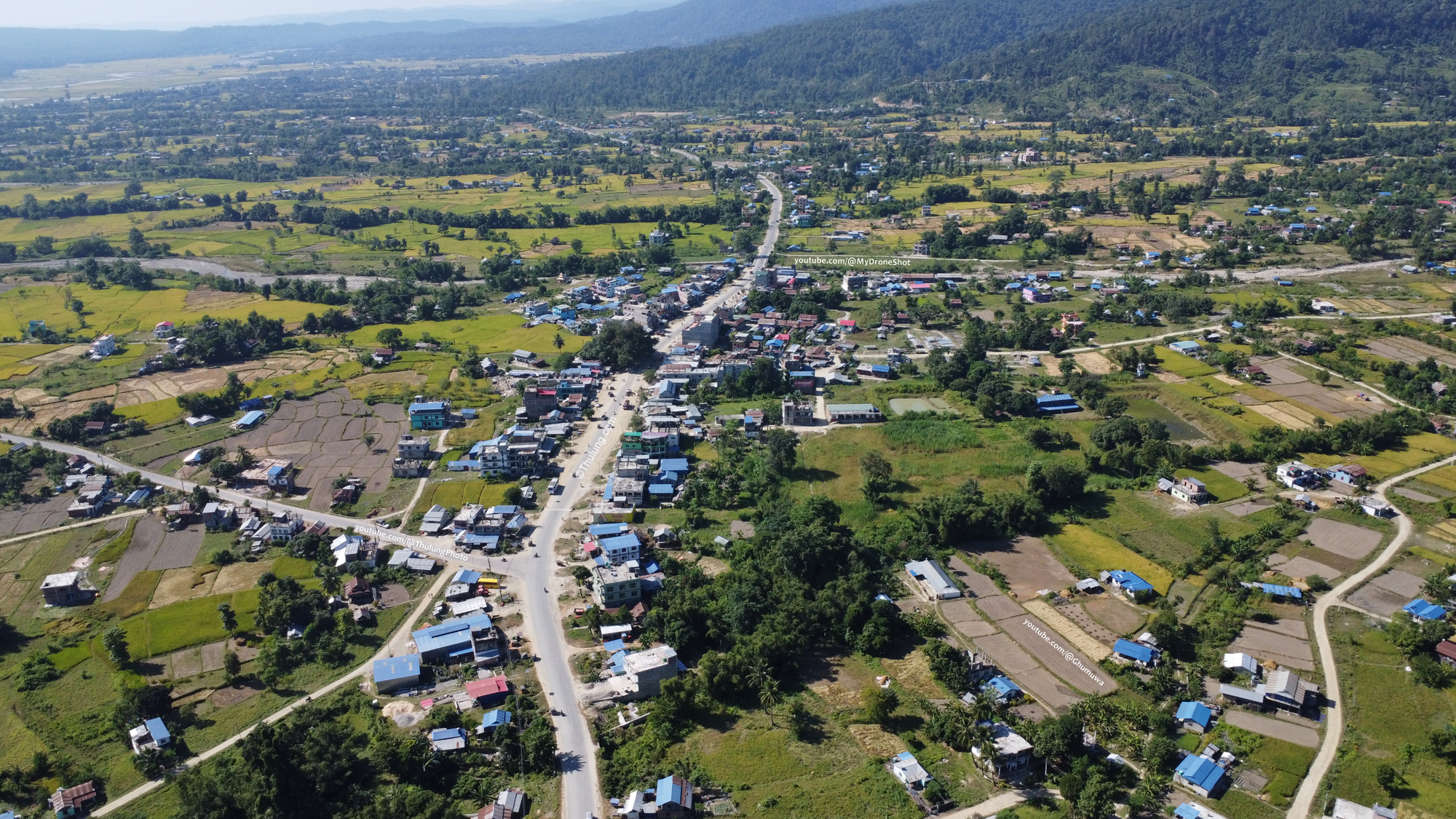
- Nickname: Rampur Thokshila, Udayapur
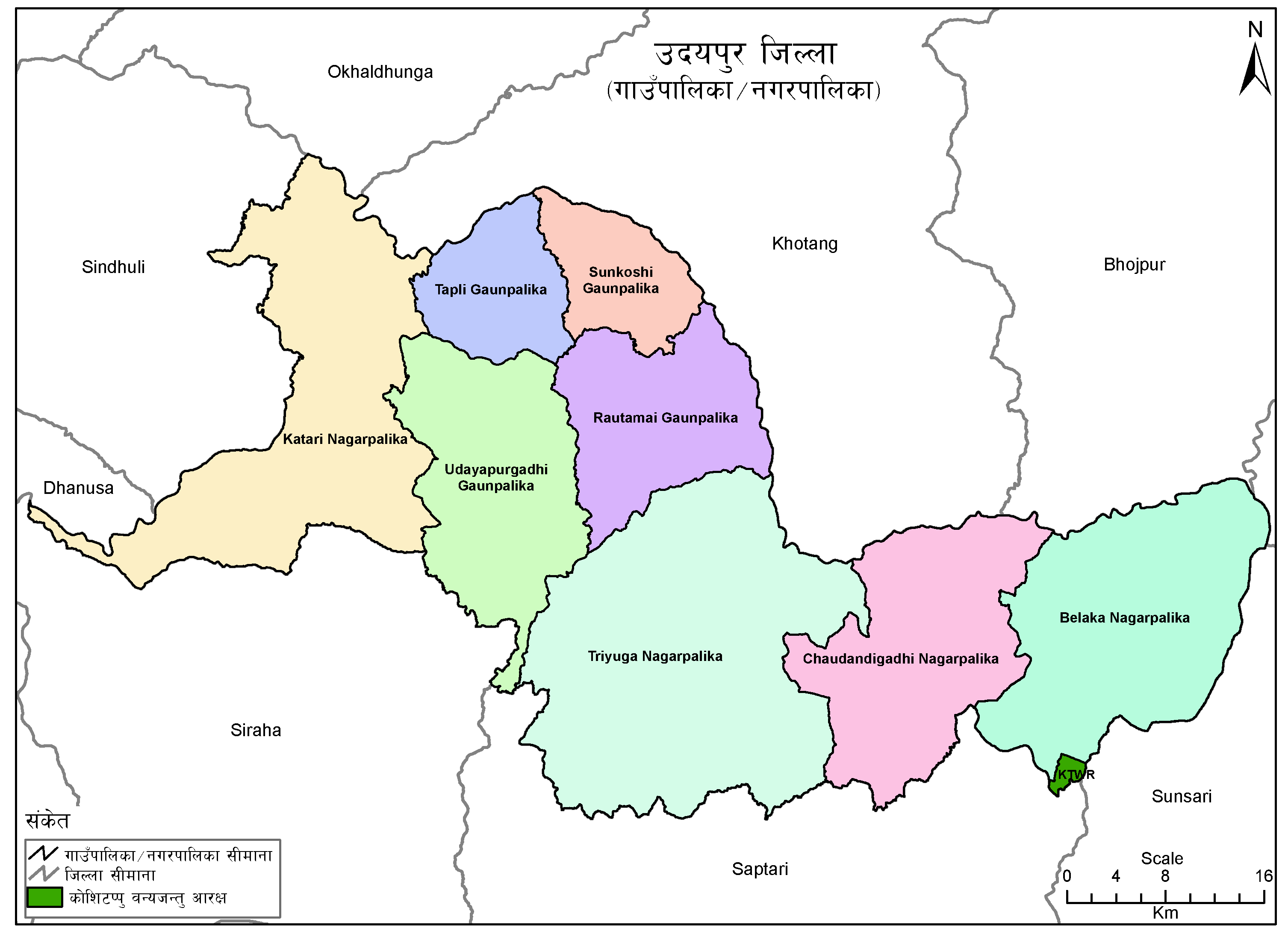
- Belaka Municipality as a part of Udayapur District

- Location in Province No. 1 Belaka Municipality (Nepal)
- Coordinates: 26.79°N 87.07°E
- Country: Nepal
- Province: Koshi Province
- District: Udayapur
- Total Wards: 9

Government
  - Type: Mayor–council
  - Body: Belaka Municipality
  - Mayor: Subash Karki (NC)
  - Deputy Mayor: Jira Rai (NCP)

Area of Municipality
  - Total: 344.73 km^{2} (133.10 sq mi)
  - Rank: 4th (Koshi Province)

Population (2011)
  - Total: 42,386
- Time zone: UTC+5:45 (NST)
- Postal code: 56300
- Area code: 035
- Website: www.belakamun.gov.np

Belaka (Nepali: बेलका) is a municipality located in Udayapur District of Koshi Province of Nepal. It is one of four urban municipalities located in Udayapur District.

The total area of the municipality is 344.73 square kilometres (133.10 sq mi), and its population is 51458 as of the 2021 Nepal census.

The municipality was formed on 10 March 2017, when the Government of Nepal announced 744 local level units as per the new constitution of Nepal 2015. The municipality was formed merging following former VDCs: Tapeshwari, Rampur Thoksila, Mainamaini and Katunjebawala.

The municipality is divided into nine wards and the headquarter of the municipality is located at Rampur Bazar in ward no.9.

== Geography ==
The municipality is situated in the easternmost part of Udayapur district. The geographical coordinations for the municipality is 26°42′09″N 86°55′29″E - 26°55′38″N 87°10′06″E Latitude and longitude. The municipality covers an area of 344.37 square kilometres (132.96 sq mi). Shiwalik and Mahabharat Range border the municipality to the north and south part. The Sun Kosi River flows on the north border of the municipality; meets the Kosi River, which flows on the eastern border. The municipality includes the urban area of Rampur Thoksila and its neighborhood, rural areas, forests, foothills and grasslands.

It is surrounded by Bhojpur District to the north, Dhankuta to the north-east, Sunsari to the east, Saptari to the south and Chaudandigadhi of Udayapur to the west. The Koshi Tappu Wildlife Reserve is in the south-east corner.

=== Koshi Tappu Wildlife Reserve ===
Koshi Tappu Wildlife Reserve is a protected area located in Ward No.2 of Belaka Municipality. It was established in 1976, designed as Ramsar Site.

=== Bhootiya Daha ===
Bhootiya Daha is a small water fall and a natural pool which is famous in Udayapur District for water activities. The pool is located in Belaka Municipality, ward no.5 at these coordinates: 26°50′35″N 86°58′35″E.

=== Mainamaini ===
Mainamainiis a temple located in ward no.7 of this municipality. It is believed that long years ago this place was ruled by Kirant King & Queen who are collectively called as Mainamaini.

Mainamaini is also famous for the statue of the pig which was built in July 2021 by Belaka municipality for Nrs.sixty Lakh..

=== Vabari Devi Temple ===
This is a sacred and well-known temple in Belaka. Many people come to visit here to worship and experience the view of the Triyuga river.

=== Ghalphadiya ===
This is where the Bhagalpur police station lies.
