= Bashasa =

Former Village Development Committee in Nepal

Coordinates: 26°48′N 86°55′E

Basaha बसाहा
- Interactive map of Basaha
- Country: Nepal
- Zone: Sagarmatha Zone
- District: Udayapur District

Population (1991)
  - Total: 7,887
- Time zone: UTC+5:45 (Nepal Time)

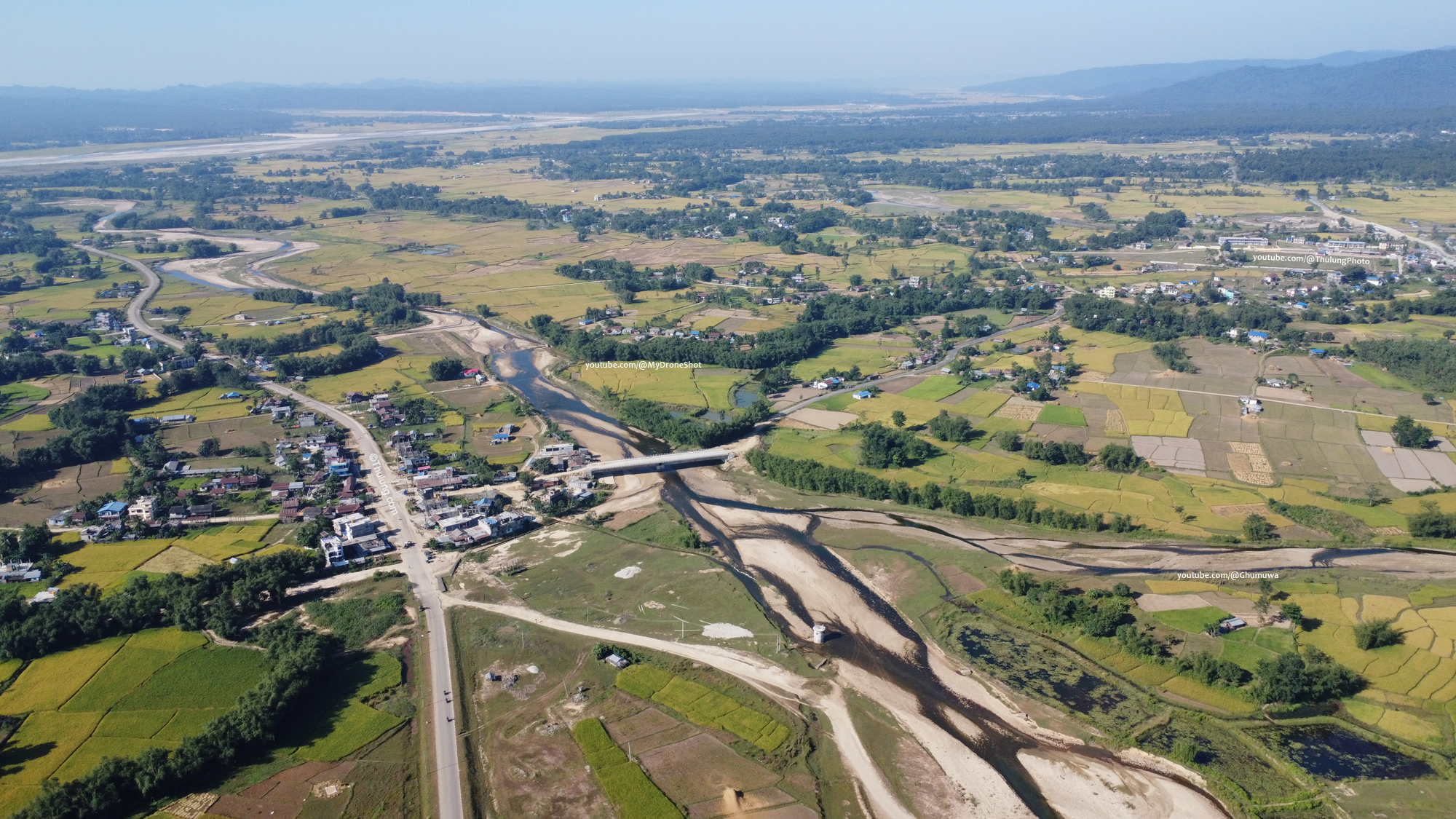
Basaha, Udayapur Eastern Nepal

Basaha is a town in Beltar Basaha Municipality in Udayapur District in the Sagarmatha Zone of south-eastern Nepal. The formerly village development committee was merged to form a new municipality on 18 May 2014. At the time of the 1991 Nepal census it had a population of 7887 people living in 1464 individual households.
