= Jante =

Jante may refer to:

- Law of Jante, a code of conduct
- Jante, Nepal, a village
