= Ambar Bahadur Rayamajhi =

Nepali politician

- अम्वर बहादुर रायामाझी

Member of Parliament, Pratinidhi Sabha
- Incumbent
- Assumed office 26 December 2022
- Preceded by: Suresh Kumar Rai
- Constituency: Udayapur 2

Personal details
- Born: 15 May 1969 (age 56) Udayapur District
- Party: CPN (UML)

Ambar Bahadur Rayamajhi is a Nepalese politician, belonging to the CPN (UML) currently serving as a member of the 2nd Federal Parliament of Nepal. In the 2022 Nepalese general election, he was elected from the Udayapur 2 (constituency).
