= Chaudandigadhi Municipality =

Chaudandigadhi चौदण्डीगढी नगरपालिका
- Municipality
- चौदण्डीगढी नगरपालिका
- Motto(s): हाम्रो चौदण्डीगढी, उज्यालो चौदण्डीगढी (Nepali); Our Chaudandigadhi, brighter Chaudandigadhi
- Location in Province No. 1 Chaudandigadhi (Nepal)
- Coordinates: 26°48′39.228″N 86°52′56.007″E
- Country: Nepal
- Province: Province No. 1
- District: Udayapur District
- Total Wards: 10
- Constituency (Parliamentary): Udayapur 1
- Constituency (Provincial): Udaypur 1 (A)
- Established: 18 May 2014
- Incorporated: 10 March 2017

Government
  - Type: Mayor–council
  - Body: Chaudandigadhi Municipality
  - Mayor: Kaluman Lama (NCP (UML))
  - Deputy Mayor: Manika Devi Dulal (NCP (UML))

Area of Municipality
  - Total: 283.78 km^{2} (109.57 sq mi)
  - Rank: 5th (Province No. 1)

Population (2011)
  - Total: 48,574
  - Density: 171.17/km^{2} (443.32/sq mi)
- Time zone: UTC+5:45 (NST)
- Headquarter: Beltar
- Website: chaudandigadhimun.gov.np

Chaudandigadhi (Nepali: चौदण्डीगढी) is a municipality in Udayapur District of Province No. 1 in Nepal that was established on 10 March 2017 by merging the former Village development committees Chaudandi, Siddipur, Hadiya and Sundarpur with the former municipality Beltar Basaha. At the time of the 2011 Nepal census, the localities out of which Chaudandigadhi would be formed had a joint population of 48,574 people living in 10,519 individual households. It is surrounded by Belka Municipality in the east, Triyuga in the west, the districts of Khotang and Bhojpur in the north and Sunsari District in the south.

The Mayor of the municipality is Kalu Man Lama and Manika Devi Dulal is Deputy Mayor

== History ==
Beltar Bashasa Municipality was established by merging the two Village Development Committee Beltar and Bashasa on 18 May 2014.

In March 2017 some more Village Development Committee were added to the Municipality: Chaudandi, Siddhipur, Hadiya and Sundarpur and the municipality was renamed Chaudandigadhi after the former Village Development Committee Chaudandi.

== Demographics ==
Population by languages
1. Nepali (51.5%)
2. Tharu (14.7%)
3. Chamling (6.20%)
4. Bantwa (5.72%)
5. Magar (5.24%)
6. Maithili (4.01%)
7. Other (12.6%)

The total population of Chaudandigadhi Municipality is 48,574 in which 22,082 are male and 26,492 are female, living in 10,519 households. 31,023 people can read and write, while only 264 people have graduated. The most spoken language in the municipality is Nepali language which is spoken by 25,035 people. Other languages such as Tharu (7,138), Chamling (3,011), Bantwa (2,780), Magar (2,545), Maithili (1,946) are also spoken. Rai people are mostly inhabited cast in the municipality with 11,814 individuals. Chhetri (11,082), Tharu (7,215), Magar (3,464), Kami (3,070), Bahun (2,305) are also inhabited gradually.
