= Paras Mani Gelal =

Nepalese politician

The Honourable Paras Mani Gelal
- पारस मणि गेलाल

Member of Parliament, Pratinidhi Sabha
- Incumbent
- Assumed office 26 March 2026
- Preceded by: Narayan Khadka
- Constituency: Udayapur 1

Personal details
- Citizenship: Nepalese
- Party: Rastriya Swatantra Party
- Education: BEd
- Profession: Politician

Paras Mani Gelal (Note: Nepali: पारस मणि गेलाल) is a Nepalese politician serving as a member of parliament from the Rastriya Swatantra Party. He is the member of the 7th Pratinidhi Sabha elected from Udayapur 1 constituency in 2026 Nepalese General Election securing 30,590 votes and defeating his closest contender Rajesh Kumar Rai of the Shram Sanskriti Party. He is an active member of the Federation of Nepal Journalists and various RSP central working groups.

During the Finance Committee meeting held on 12 May 2026, Gelal urged the government to investigate the income from the tree cutting during the construction of the proposed airport in Jogidaha, Udayapur where he claimed that trees worth NPR 3 billion were cut for the airport to be built at a cost of NPR 1 billion.

== Electoral performance ==
Election	Year	Constituency	Contested for	Political party	Result	Votes	% of votes	Ref.
Nepal general election	2026	Udayapur 1	Pratinidhi Sabha member	Rastriya Swatantra Party	Won	30,590	41.38%	
