= Iname =

Iname may refer to:

- Iname, Nepal
- iName, a former email account and email address provider
- I-name
- Biffy Clyro's debut single Iname
