= Balamta =

Development committee

Coordinates: 27.0900°N 86.6700°E

Balamta (बलम्ता ) is a small Village Development Committee in eastern Nepal, located at northern part of the Udayapur District. It is an area with a length of about 30 miles and breadth of 15 miles extending from the top of the foothill down to the Sun Kosi river, one of the major rivers in Nepal, at its eastern tip. Balamta is surrounded by other VDCs such as; Tamlichha, Barah, and Jante. It has been divided into nine wards: Chhatang, Dandatol, Chalestemma, Majhagaun, Tharpulung, Deurali, Laku, and Tirla. The population is about 7,000 and the majority of people who live in these villages are Rai. The communities have a unique culture and their own religion. Balamta has three primary schools, a higher secondary school, a primary health center, a post office, and the office of the VDC. Balamta village is well known for the statue of 'Yalambar', the first Kirat King of Nepal. The society is very consistent, hospitable, and live with a good virtue of ethics. People are well educated and the village has a literacy rate of 90 percent. People from this province are scattered all around the world. The main destination countries are India, Hong Kong, UK, Qatar, Saudi Arabia, Kuwait, China, Malaysia, Dubai, USA, and others.
