= Hadiya, Nepal =

Former Village Development Committee in Nepal

Hadiya, Nepal हडिया
- Village development committee
- Location in Nepal
- Coordinates: 26.78°N 86.84°E
- Country: Nepal
- Zone: Sagarmatha Zone
- District: Udayapur District

Population (2011)
  - Total: 11,331
- Time zone: UTC+5:45 (Nepal Time)
- Postal code: 56303
- Area code: 035

Hadiya, Nepal is a village development committee in Udayapur District in the Sagarmatha Zone of south-eastern Nepal. At the time of the 2011 Nepal census it had a population of 11331 people living in 2355 individual households. Cheetri and Bharmin is the major ethnic community with huge population while Magars, Sunuwar, Newar, Tharu and Madhesi are ethnic minorities living in the village.

The village is rural and connected mostly with gravel roads. Most of the houses are wooden with sparely modern houses made of bricks and cement. The center of town is crowded densely with unplanned buildings and weak infrastructures as well as pollution due to vehicles, scattered wastage and dusty gravel roads has created critical problem in the town and their lifestyle as every household waste their productive time The hilly people brings their agricultural products to sell in the town and buys clothes, equipment and other goods.the town is the most populated municipality of Udayapur District besides Gaighat, Beltar and Katari. Agriculture is the major occupation while service sector is blooming recently. The town was badly affected during 10 years of civil war which destroyed many infrastructures of town but now most of the governmental office has been re-constructed. Political leader Dr. Narayan Khadka has been elected several time as a representative of the town though town has been waiting for his policies to be implemented.

== Schools ==
=== Private Schools ===
Budur Lal Vidhya Niketan PVT LTD

- Sudarshan Secondary School
- Chandi Bright Future

=== Government Schools ===
- Shree Janta U. Ma. Vi. School
- Shree Siddheshwory Ma. Vi. School
- Shree Bhagwati Ma. Vi. School
- Shree Jana Bikash U. Ma. Vi. School Bhima

== Transports ==
- Hadiya - Biratnagar
- Hadiya - Kathmandu
- Destination to Gaighat
- Some small means of transport for local places like Fatepur, Sibai, and Beltar.

== Agriculture ==
- rice
- maize
- sugarcane
- millet
- oil seeds
- vegetables (local)
