= Himal Karki =

Nepalese politician

Honourable Himal Karki
- हिमाल कार्की

Minister for Physical Infrastructure and Urban Development of Koshi Province
- In office 2 November 2021 – 9 January 2023
- Governor: Somnath Adhikari; Parshuram Khapung
- Chief Minister: Rajendra Kumar Rai
- Preceded by: Bhim Acharya as Chief Minister
- Succeeded by: Durga Prasad Chapagain

Member of the Koshi Provincial Assembly
- Incumbent
- Assumed office 31 January 2018
- President: Bidya Devi Bhandari
- Prime Minister: Sher Bahadur Deuba
- Constituency: Udayapur 1(B)

Personal details
- Born: Udayapur, Nepal
- Party: Nepali Congress

Himal Karki (Nepali: हिमाल कार्की) is a Nepalese Politician and member of the 2nd Koshi Provincial Assembly. Karki is also the deputy leader of the Nepali Congress party in the Provincial Assembly. He served as Minister for Physical Infrastructure Development of Province No. 1 from November 2021 to January 2023.

== Electoral history ==
=== 2017 Nepalese provincial elections ===
Udayapur 1(B)
Party	Candidate	Votes
Nepali Congress	Himal Karki	16,792
CPN (Maoist Centre)	Ram Bahadur Thapa Magar	15,194
Others		1,939
Invalid votes		1,434
Result	Congress gain	
