= Pramila Rai =

Nepali politician

- प्रमिला राई

Member of Parliament, Pratinidhi Sabha for Nepali Congress party list
- Incumbent
- Assumed office 4 March 2018

Member of Constituent Assembly for Nepali Congress party list
- In office 28 May 2008 – 28 May 2012

Personal details
- Born: 12 May 1963 (age 63) Moli, Okhaldhunga District
- Party: Nepali Congress
- Parents: Bal Bahadur Rai (father); Padma Shobha Rai (mother)

Pramila Rai (प्रमिला राई, born 12 May 1963) is a Nepali politician and an incumbent member of the House of Representatives of the federal parliament of Nepal. She was also elected to the first constituent assembly in 2008. Daughter of prominent Nepali Congress leader Bal Bahadur Rai, she joined politics as a student, as a member of the student wing of Nepali Congress. Both her elections to the constituent assembly in 2008 and to the House of Representatives in 2017 were under the proportional representation system. An influential party leader in Udayapur District, she contested the second constituent assembly election from Udayapur-2 constituency under the first-past-the-post system but was defeated.

== Early life ==
Rai was born on 12 May 1963 in Moli, Okhaldhunga to senior Nepali Congress leader, Late Bal Bahadur Rai, and his wife Padam Shova Rai. (Note: Her mother's name is Pancha Shova Rai according to a different source.) She has a Bachelor's Degree in the Humanities.

== Career ==
Rai joined politics as a member of Nepal Students Union, the student wing of Nepali Congress, in 1976. She has also been affiliated with two other sister wings of the party, namely, Nepal Women's Association and Nepal Trade Union Congress.

She is the founding member of Balbahadur Rai Memorial Foundation which was established in 2011 in memory of Nepali Congress leader and her father, Balbahadur Rai, who died in 2010.

=== Member of the first Constituent Assembly ===
Rai was elected to the first Constituent Assembly in 2008 from Nepali Congress under the proportional representation system, representing Udayapur District.

=== Candidacy for the second Constituent Assembly ===
Rai was a candidate for Nepali Congress under the first-past-the-post system in the 2013 Constituent Assembly Election, contesting the Udayapur-2 constituency. She was defeated by Manju Kumari Chaudhary of CPN UML by a margin of 23 votes. Party leaders from district to the ward level in the constituency were dismissed for treason against the party in the aftermath of the loss.

=== Member of the House of Representatives ===
In the 2017 federal election, Rai was elected to the House of Representatives from Nepali Congress under the proportional representation system representing Udayapur District. She filled the seat reserved for women and indigenous groups. In the parliament, she serves as a member of the Parliamentary Finance Committee. She is also a member of the Ministry of Culture, Tourism and Civil Aviation in the shadow cabinet of the main opposition, Nepali Congress.

== Views ==
Rai considers the citizenship laws in the country discriminatory against women and has vowed to push amendments for complete gender equality in the citizenship-related provisions.

== Personal life ==
Rai's permanent residence was at Triyuga - 10, Deuri of Udayapur, As of 2013. She has two children, a daughter and a son.
