= Katari Municipality =

Place in Nepal

Katari Municipality कटारी नगरपालिका
- Municipality
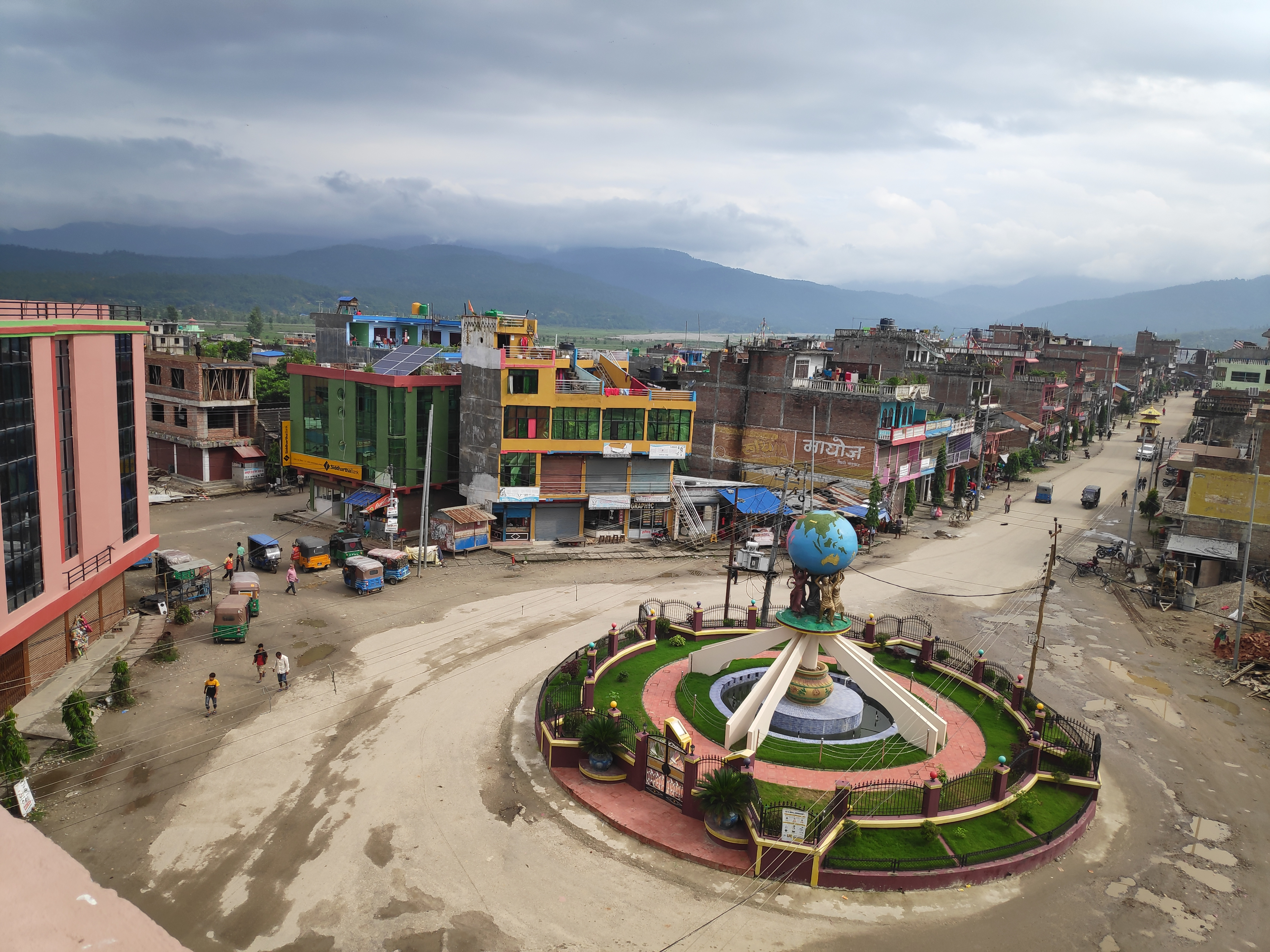
- Bhugol Park, Katari, Udayapur, Nepal.

- Location in Koshi Province Katari Municipality (Nepal)
- Coordinates: 26.95°N 86.37°E
- Country: Nepal
- Province: Koshi
- District: Udayapur
- No. of wards: 14
- Established: 2014
- Incorporated (VDC): Tribeni, Katari, Risku, Lekhani, Hardeni, Limpatar, Sorungchabise, Sirise

Government
  - Type: Mayor–council
  - Body: Katari Municipality
  - Mayor: Mr. Rajesh Chandra Shrestha (NC)
  - Deputy Mayor: Mrs. Geeta Khadka (NCP)
  - MP & Constituency: Udayapur 2 Sury Lama (RSP)
  - MLA & Constituency: Udayapur 2(B); Ram Kumar Khatri (NCP)

Area
  - Total: 424.89 km^{2} (164.05 sq mi)
  - Rank: 3rd in Province

Population (2011)
  - Total: 56,146
- Time zone: UTC+05:45 (NPT)
- Website: kataarimun.gov.np

Katari is a Municipality in Udayapur District in the Koshi province of south-eastern Nepal. It lies by the Tawa river (formed by unification of original Tawa river and Baidhyanath river) having the bridge of length 123.5m. This was established by merging two existing village development committees i.e. Triveni and Katari on 18 May 2014. At the time of the 1991 Nepal census it had a population of 7230 people living in 1410 individual households. Forty years later, Katari had undergone rapid growth, achieving a population of 59,507 people by the 2021 census. There is a big Government school Triveni secondary school

== Climate ==
Climate data for Kurule Ghat, Katari, elevation 497 m (1,631 ft)
Month	Jan	Feb	Mar	Apr	May	Jun	Jul	Aug	Sep	Oct	Nov	Dec	Year
Mean daily maximum °C (°F)	20.9 (69.6)	23.7 (74.7)	28.7 (83.7)	32.6 (90.7)	33.2 (91.8)	32.6 (90.7)	30.9 (87.6)	30.7 (87.3)	30.2 (86.4)	29.8 (85.6)	26.4 (79.5)	22.4 (72.3)	28.5 (83.3)
Mean daily minimum °C (°F)	8.5 (47.3)	9.8 (49.6)	13.8 (56.8)	18.3 (64.9)	21.0 (69.8)	23.2 (73.8)	23.4 (74.1)	23.2 (73.8)	22.0 (71.6)	19.2 (66.6)	13.1 (55.6)	8.9 (48.0)	17.0 (62.7)
Average precipitation mm (inches)	13.0 (0.51)	11.6 (0.46)	22.3 (0.88)	44.0 (1.73)	75.5 (2.97)	145.4 (5.72)	272.3 (10.72)	185.2 (7.29)	131.7 (5.19)	4.9 (0.19)	7.8 (0.31)	9.3 (0.37)	923 (36.34)
Source 1: Australian National University
Source 2: Japan International Cooperation Agency (precipitation)

== See also ==
- Triyuga
- Belaka
- Chaudandigadhi
