= National Highway 21 (Nepal) =

Highway in Nepal

Sitapaila-Dharke Highway सीतापाइला-धार्के राजमार्ग
- राष्ट्रिय राजमार्ग २१
- National Highway 21
- NH21 in red

Route information
- Maintained by MoPIT (Department of Roads)
- Length: 24 km (15 mi)

Major junctions
- East end: Sitapaila (Kathmandu)
- West end: Dharke (Dhading)

Location
- Country: Nepal
- Provinces: Bagmati Province
- Districts: Kathmandu District, Dhading District

Highway system
- Roads in Nepal
← NH20	→ NH22

National Highway 21 (Sitapaila-Dharke) is a 24 kilometres (15 mi) National Highway of Nepal, located in Bagmati Province It is an alternative route to Naubise-Nagdhunga section of NH41. The Dharke-Sitapaila stretch begins from Dharke along the Prithvi Highway (NH17) in Dhading and links Sitapaila of Kathmandu through Maheshphant, Bhimdhunga and Ramkot. After the completion of the upgrade work, the 24-km two-lane road will be 12 metres wide. The road is considered to be the shortest alternative route to enter the capital.
