= Aaptar =

Former Village Development Committee in Nepal

Aaptar आँपटार
- Neighborhood
- Location in Nepal Aaptar (Nepal) Aaptar (Asia)
- Coordinates: 26.97°N 86.74°E
- Country: Nepal
- Province: Province No. 1
- District: Udayapur District
- Rural Municipality: Rautamai

Population (2011)
  - Total: 4,494
- Time zone: UTC+5:45 (Nepal Time)

Aaptar was a village development committee in Udayapur District in the Sagarmatha Zone of Eastern Development Region of Nepal. It became part of Rautamai Rural Municipality after reconstruction of administration in Nepal.

Fulfilling the requirement of the new constitution of Nepal in 2015, all old municipalities and villages (which were more than 3900 in number) were restructured into 753 new units.

At the time of the 2011 Nepal census it had a population of 4494 people living in 862 individual households.
