= Rautamai Rural Municipality =

Rautamai Gaunpalika रौतामाई गाउँपालिका
- Rural Municipality
- Location in Nepal
- Coordinates: 26.99°N 86.66°E
- Country: Nepal
- Province: Province No. 1
- District: Udayapur
- Established: 10 March 2017

Government
  - Chairperson: Mr.Gajendra Bahadur Khadka (NCP)
  - Vice-chairperson: Mrs.Kumari Jyu Thakuri (NCP)

Area
  - Total: 204 km^{2} (79 sq mi)

Population (2011)
  - Total: 23,481
  - Density: 115/km^{2} (298/sq mi)
- Time zone: UTC+5:45 (Nepal Standard Time)
- Area code: 035
- Headquarter: Bhutar (The old office of Bhutar Village Development Committee
- Website: Official Website

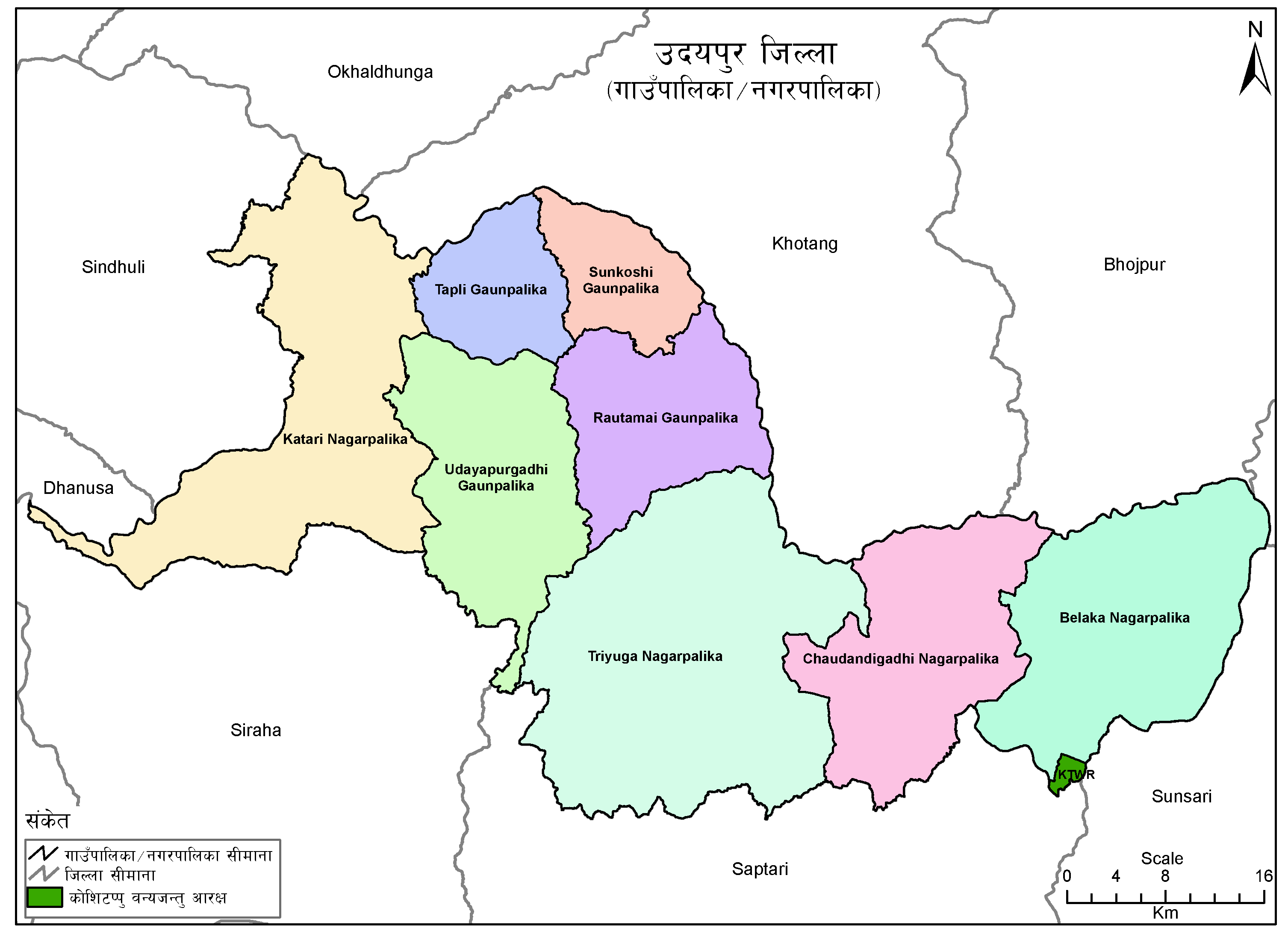
Rautamai

Rautamai Rural Municipality (Nepali: रौतामाई गाउँपालिका) is a rural municipality in Udayapur district of Province No. 1 in Nepal. There are 4 rural municipalities in Udayapur district. There are 8 wards in this municipality. According to 2011 census of Nepal, the total population of the municipality is 23,481 and total area is 204 km². The headquarter of the municipality is in Bhuttar

The rural municipality was established on March 10, 2017 when Ministry of Federal Affairs and Local Development dissolved the existing village development committees and announced the establishment of this new local body.

Nametar, Bhuttar, Laphagaun, Pokhari, Rauta and Aaptar VDCs were merged to form the new rural municipality.

== See also ==
- Udayapurgadhi Rural Municipality
- Sunkoshi Rural Municipality
- Tapli Rural Municipality
