= Limpatar =

Former Village Development Committee in Nepal

Limpatar लिम्पाटार
- Village development committee
- Location in Nepal
- Coordinates: 27.05°N 86.46°E
- Country: Nepal
- Zone: Sagarmatha Zone
- District: Udayapur District

Population (1991)
  - Total: 1,963
- Time zone: UTC+5:45 (Nepal Time)

Limpatar is a village development committee in Udayapur District in the Sagarmatha Zone of south-eastern Nepal. At the time of the 1991 Nepal census it had a population of 1963 people living in 354 individual households.
