= National Highway 22 (Nepal) =

Highway in Nepal

Jatahi-Janakpur-Dhalkebar Highway जटही-जनकपुर-ढल्केवर राजमार्ग
- राष्ट्रिय राजमार्ग २२
- National Highway 22
- NH22 in red

Route information
- Maintained by MoPIT (Department of Roads)
- Length: 40 km (25 mi)

Major junctions
- North end: Dhalkebar
- Janakpur
- South end: Jatahi

Location
- Country: Nepal
- Provinces: Madhesh Province
- Districts: Dhanusha District

Highway system
- Roads in Nepal
← NH21	→ NH23

National Highway 22 (Jatahi-Janakpur-Dhalkebar) is a 40-kilometre (25 mi) national highway in Nepal, located in Madhesh Province.

== Detail ==
NH22 is a six-lane, 40-kilometre (25 mi) highway which starts on the Indo-Nepal border at Jatahi and runs north up to Janakpur Airport. The highway turns west near the airport and reaches Bindhi; from there it turns north and runs up to Janakpur Zero mile. From there the road goes straight to Dhalkebar crossing Laxminia Bazar. The NH21 terminates at Dhalkebar after meeting with NH01 (Mahendra Highway). On the Indo-Nepal border, the highway crosses the border and intersects National Highway 227 at Piparaun.

NH22 in detail
#	Section	Length (km)	Status
1	Dhalkebar–Laxminiya Bazar	25.03	Asphalt
2	Laxminiya Bazar–Zero Mile	03.06	Asphalt
3	Zero Mile–Bindhi	01.55	Asphalt
4	Bindhi–Jatahi	14.00	Gravel
