= Panchawati =

Panchawati पञ्चावती
- Neighborhood (HQ of Udayapurgadhi)
- Location in Nepal
- Coordinates: 26.91°N 86.52°E
- Country: Nepal
- Province: Province No. 1
- District: Udayapur
- Rural Municipality: Udayapurgadhi

Population (1991)
  - Total: 6,580
- Time zone: UTC+5:45 (Nepal Time)

Panchawati is a village in, and headquarter of, Udayapurgadhi rural municipality in Udayapur District in Province No. 1 of south-eastern Nepal. At the time of the 1991 Nepal census it had a population of 6,580 people living in 1223 individual households.

Panchawati was a village development committee before 2015. In 2015, when Nepal became a federal state, a total of 744 local administrative units were established. 8 such units were established in Udayapur District, including Udayapurgadhi. Panchawati was merged into Udayapurgadhi and established as its headquarter.

Udayapurgadhi was previously Headquarter of Udayapur District before 1972, when the headquarter was moved to Gaighat.
