= Bhuttar =

Bhuttar भूतटार
- Neighborhood
- Location in Nepal Bhuttar (Nepal)
- Coordinates: 26.99°N 86.66°E
- Country: Nepal
- Province: Province No. 1
- District: Udayapur District
- Rural Municipality: Rautamai

Population (1991)
  - Total: 3,244
- Time zone: UTC+5:45 (Nepal Time)

Bhuttar was a village development committee in Udayapur District in the Sagarmatha Zone of Eastern Development Region of Nepal. It became part of Rautamai Rural Municipality after reconstruction of administration in Nepal. It is now municipal headquarter of Rautamai rural municipality.

Fulfilling the requirement of the new constitution of Nepal in 2015, all old municipalities and villages (which were more than 3900 in number) were restructured into 753 new units.

At the time of the 1991 Nepal census it had a population of 3244 people living in 583 individual households.
