= Risku =

Risku रिस्कु
- Village development committee
- Location in Nepal
- Coordinates: 26.95°N 86.45°E
- Country: Nepal
- Zone: Sagarmatha Zone
- District: Udayapur District

Population (1991)
  - Total: 11,546
- Time zone: UTC+5:45 (Nepal Time)

Risku is a village development committee in Udayapur District in the Sagarmatha Zone of south-eastern Nepal. At the time of the 1991 Nepal census it had a population of 11,546 people living in 2083 individual households.
