= Suresh Kumar Rai =

Nepalese politician

- सुरेश कुमार राई

Member of Parliament, Pratinidhi Sabha
- Incumbent
- Assumed office 4 March 2018
- Preceded by: Manju Kumari Chaudhary
- Constituency: Udayapur 2

Personal details
- Born: 5 February 1976 (age 50)
- Party: CPN (Maoist Centre)

Suresh Kumar Rai is a Nepalese politician, belonging to the Nepal Communist Party currently serving as the member of the Constituent Assembly of Nepal. In the 2017 Nepalese general election he was elected from the Udayapur 2 constituency, securing 22551 (56.07%) votes.
