= National Highway 23 (Nepal) =

Highway in Nepal

Diktel-Khadichaur Highway दिक्तेल-खाडीचौर राजमार्ग
- राष्ट्रिय राजमार्ग २३
- National Highway 23
- NH23 in red

Route information
- Maintained by MoPIT (Department of Roads)
- Length: 291 km (181 mi)
- History: Under construction

Major junctions
- East end: Diktel
- Basa, Salleri, Junbesi, Jiri, Bhimeshwar
- West end: Khadichaur

Location
- Country: Nepal
- Provinces: Koshi Province, Bagmati Province
- Districts: Khotang, Solukhumbu, Ramechap, Dolakha, Sindhupalchowk

Highway system
- Roads in Nepal
| ← NH22 | → NH24 |

NH23 is an interprovincial national highway between Bagmati Province and Koshi Province of Nepal. The total length of the highway is 291 kilometres (181 mi). The western section (136 kilometres (85 mi) in Bagmati Province) is completed and the eastern section (155 kilometres (96 mi)) is planned.

Khadichaur-Mudhe-Charikot, the 55-kilometre road section, is completed. The Charikot-Jiri section is also completed. According to the Strategic Road Network (SSRN) of DoR, the Jiri-Tamakoshi (37.4 km) section is also completed with black topped road.

The eastern section of NH-23 (Tamakoshi to Diktel via Pekarnas, Salleri) is not yet completed, and is planned to be constructed in the near future.
