= Sirise =

Sirise सिरिसे
- Village development committee
- Location in Nepal
- Coordinates: 27.04°N 86.42°E
- Country: Nepal
- Zone: Sagarmatha Zone
- District: Udayapur District

Population (1991)
  - Total: 3,558
- Time zone: UTC+5:45 (Nepal Time)

Sirise is a village development committee in Udayapur District in the Sagarmatha Zone of south-eastern Nepal. At the time of the 1991 Nepal census it had a population of 3558 people living in 613 individual households.
