= Shorung Chabise =

Sorung Chhabise सोरुङ छबिसे
- Ward
- Location in Nepal
- Coordinates: 27.10°N 86.44°E
- Country: Nepal
- Zone: Sagarmatha Zone
- District: Udayapur District

Population (1991)
  - Total: 3,251
- Time zone: UTC+5:45 (Nepal Time)

Sorung Chhabise is a village in Katari Municipality. As per the previous structuring it was a village development committee in Udayapur District in the Sagarmatha Zone of south-eastern Nepal. At the time of the 1991 Nepal census it had a population of 3251 people living in 567 individual households.
