= Rampur Thoksila =

Rampur Thokshila रामपुर ठोक्शिला
- Village development committee
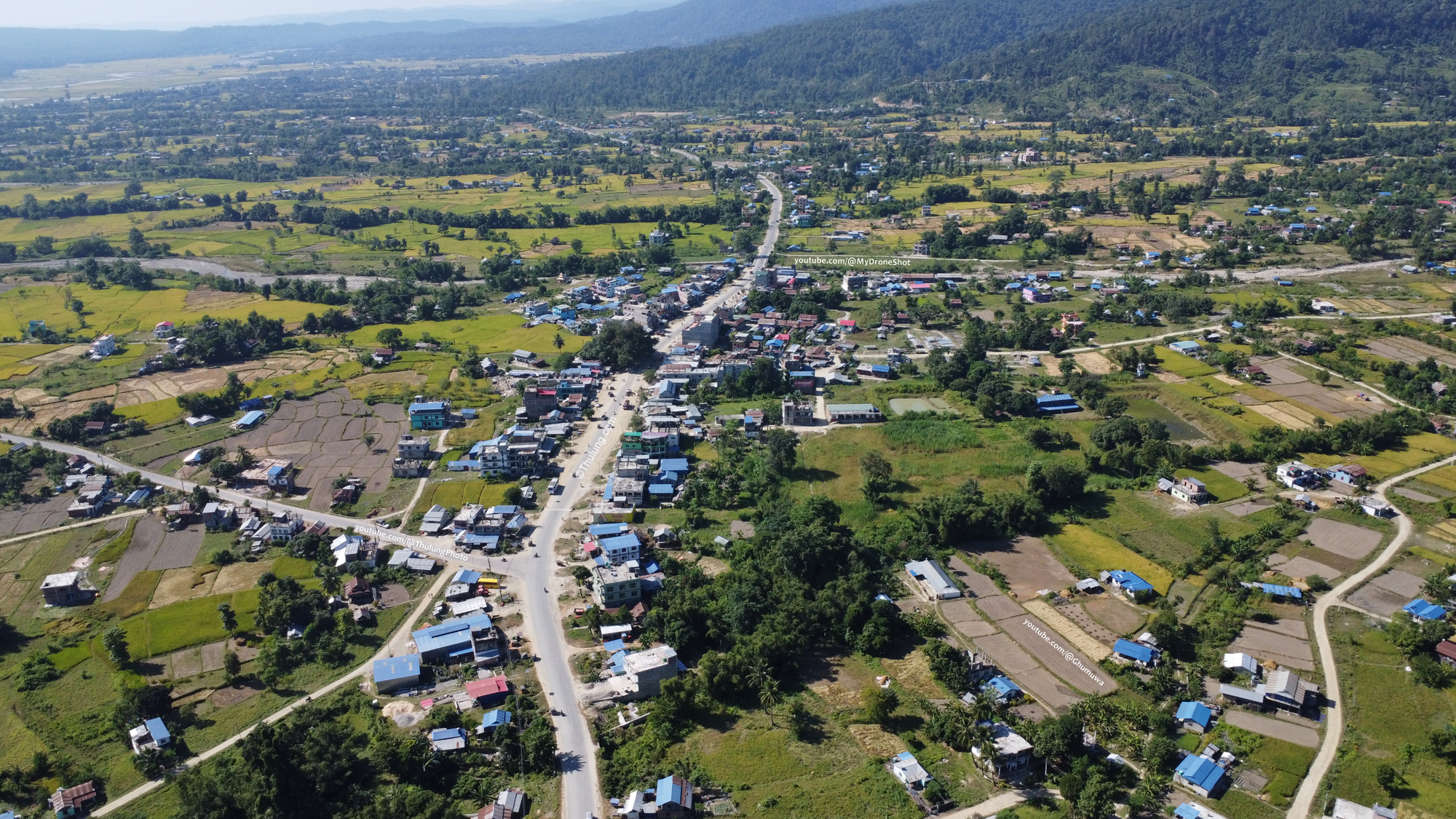
- Rampur Thoksila, Udayapur Eastern Nepal

- Location in Nepal
- Coordinates: 26.79°N 87.07°E
- Country: Nepal
- Province: Province No. 1
- District: Udayapur

Population (1991)
  - Total: 11,940
- Time zone: UTC+5:45 (Nepal Time)
- Postal code: 56301
- Area code: 035

Thokshila (Belaka) is a municipality in Udayapur District in koshi province of south-eastern Nepal. At the time of the 2021 Nepal census it had a population of 56,458 people living in 12534 individual households.
