= Sithdipur =

Sithdipur सिद्धिपुर
- Village development committee
- Location in Nepal Sithdipur (Nepal)
- Coordinates: 26°53′N 86°52′E
- Country: Nepal
- Zone: Sagarmatha Zone
- District: Udayapur District

Population (1991)
  - Total: 2,606
- Time zone: UTC+5:45 (Nepal Time)

Siddhipur is a village development committee in Udayapur District in the Sagarmatha Zone of south-eastern Nepal. At the time of the 1991 Nepal census it had a population of 2606 people living in 459 individual households.
