= Baraha, Dailekh =

Coordinates: 28°45′N 81°38′E

Baraha, Nepal बराह
- Village Development Committee
- Interactive map of Baraha, Nepal
- Country: Nepal
- Zone: Bheri Zone
- District: Dailekh District

Population (1991)
  - Total: 3,085
- Time zone: UTC+5:45 (Nepal Time)

Baraha is a Village Development Committee in Dailekh District in the Bheri Zone of western-central Nepal. At the time of the 1991 Nepal census it had a population of 3085 people residing in 552 individual households.
