= Thanagaun =

Coordinates: 27°06′53″N 86°32′45″E

Thanagaun थानगाउँ
- Village development committee
- Interactive map of Thanagaun
- Country: Nepal
- Zone: Sagarmatha Zone
- District: Udayapur District

Population (1991)
  - Total: 2,408
- Time zone: UTC+5:45 (Nepal Time)

Thanagaun is a village development committee in Udayapur District in the Sagarmatha Zone of south-eastern Nepal. At the time of the 1991 Nepal census it had a population of 2408 people living in 428 individual households.
