= Rupatar =

Rupatar रूपटार
- Village development committee
- Location in Nepal
- Coordinates: 27.09°N 86.54°E
- Country: Nepal
- Zone: Sagarmatha Zone
- District: Udayapur District

Population (1991)
  - Total: 3,266
- Time zone: UTC+5:45 (Nepal Time)

Rupatar is a village development committee in Udayapur District in the Sagarmatha Zone of south-eastern Nepal. At the time of the 1991 Nepal census it had a population of 556 people living in 3266 individual households.
