= Bhalayadanda =

Former Village Development Committee in Nepal

Coordinates: 26°48′50″N 86°41′28″E

Valaya Danda भलायाडाँडा
- Village development committee
- Interactive map of Valaya Danda
- Country: Nepal
- Zone: Sagarmatha Zone
- District: Udayapur District

Population (1991)
  - Total: 5,770
- Time zone: UTC+5:45 (Nepal Time)

Valaya Danda is a village development committee in Udayapur District in the Sagarmatha Zone of south-eastern Nepal. At the time of the 1991 Nepal census it had a population of 5,770 people living in 1,021 individual households.
