= Tawasri =

Tawasri तावाश्री
- Village development committee
- Location in Nepal
- Coordinates: 27.01°N 86.50°E
- Country: Nepal
- Zone: Sagarmatha Zone
- District: Udayapur District

Population (1991)
  - Total: 4,612
- Time zone: UTC+5:45 (Nepal Time)

Tawasri is a village development committee in Udayapur District in the Sagarmatha Zone of south-eastern Nepal. At the time of the 1991 Nepal census it had a population of 4612 people living in 843 individual households.
