= Sundarpur, Udayapur =

Sundarpur, Udayapur सुन्दपुर
- Village development committee
- Location in Nepal
- Coordinates: 26.74°N 86.88°E
- Country: Nepal
- Zone: Sagarmatha Zone
- District: Udayapur District

Population (1991)
  - Total: 4,439
- Time zone: UTC+5:45 (Nepal Time)

Sundarpur is a village development committee in Udayapur District in the Sagarmatha Zone of south-eastern Nepal. At the time of the 1991 Nepal census it had a population of 4439 people living in 837 individual households.
