= Tapeshwari =

Tapeshwari तपेश्वरी
- Village development committee
- Location in Nepal
- Coordinates: 26.76°N 86.98°E
- Country: Nepal
- Province: Province No. 1
- District: Udayapur District

Population (1991)
  - Total: 9,704
- Time zone: UTC+5:45 (Nepal Time)

Tapeshwari is a village development committee in Udayapur District in Province No. 1 of south-eastern Nepal. At the time of the 1991 Nepal census it had a population of 97045.
