= Mainamaini =

Mainamaini मैनामैनी
- Village development committee
- Location in Nepal
- Coordinates: 26.88°N 87.13°E
- Country: Nepal
- Province: Province No. 1
- District: Udayapur District

Population (1991)
  - Total: 4,033
- Time zone: UTC+5:45 (Nepal Time)

Mainamaini is a village development committee in Udayapur District in Province No. 1 of south-eastern Nepal. At the time of the 1991 Nepal census it had a population of 4033 people living in 683 individual households.
