= Dumre =

Dumre डुम्रे
- Village development committee
- Location in Nepal
- Coordinates: 26.96°N 86.56°E
- Country: Nepal
- Zone: Sagarmatha Zone
- District: Udayapur District

Population (1991)
  - Total: 11,749
- Time zone: UTC+5:45 (Nepal Time)

Dumre is a village development committee in Udayapur District in the Sagarmatha Zone of south-eastern Nepal. At the time of the 1991 Nepal census it had a population of 11,749 people living in 2510 individual households.

There is another nepali town Dumre nearby Bandipur (about 3 km).

Surname : Dumre(डुम्रे) is also surname and represents Brahmin caste and Gotra is ‘Dhananjaya’. People of this caste are usually from Syangja District.
