= Lekhani, Udayapur =

Former Village Development Committee in Nepal

Lekhani, Sagarmatha लेखानी
- Village development committee
- Location in Nepal
- Coordinates: 27.14°N 86.40°E
- Country: Nepal
- Zone: Sagarmatha Zone
- District: Udayapur District

Population (1991)
  - Total: 2,141
- Time zone: UTC+5:45 (Nepal Time)

Lekhani, Sagarmatha is a village development committee in Udayapur District in the Sagarmatha Zone of south-eastern Nepal. At the time of the 1991 Nepal census it had a population of 2141 people living in 373 individual households.
