= Chaudandi =

Chaudandi चौदण्डी
- Village development committee
- Location in Nepal
- Coordinates: 26.88°N 86.94°E
- Country: Nepal
- Zone: Sagarmatha Zone
- District: Udayapur District

Population (1991)
  - Total: 2,715
- Time zone: UTC+5:45 (Nepal Time)

Chaudandi is a village development committee in Udayapur District in the Sagarmatha Zone of south-eastern Nepal. At the time of the 1991 Nepal census it had a population of 2715 people living in 469 individual households.
