= Manju Kumari Chaudhary =

Nepali politician and former parliamentarian

Personal details
- Party: Nepal Communist Party

Manju Kumari Chaudhary is a Nepali communist politician. She was elected to the second Constituent Assembly from CPN UML under the first-past-the-post system, from Udayapur-2 constituency, in the 2013 election, defeating her nearest rival, Pramila Rai of Nepali Congress, by a margin of 23 votes. She was 39 years old at the time.
