= Iname, Nepal =

Former Village Development Committee in Nepal

Iname, Nepal इनामे
- Village development committee
- Location in Nepal
- Coordinates: 27.06°N 86.58°E
- Country: Nepal
- Zone: Sagarmatha Zone
- District: Udayapur District

Population (2011)
  - Total: 3,256
- Time zone: UTC+5:45 (Nepal Time)

Iname is a village development committee in Udayapur District in the Sagarmatha Zone of south-eastern Nepal. At the time of the 1991 Nepal census it had a population of 3256 people living in 587 individual households.
