= Narayan Khadka =

Nepali politician

Honourable Dr. Narayan Khadka
- डा. नारायण खड्का

Minister of Foreign Affairs
- In office 22 September 2021 – 26 December 2022
- President: Bidhya Devi Bhandari
- Prime Minister: Sher Bahadur Deuba
- Preceded by: Pradeep Kumar Gyawali
- Succeeded by: Bimala Rai Paudyal

1st Minister of Urban Development of Nepal
- In office 25 February 2014 – 10 October 2015
- President: Ram Baran Yadav
- Prime Minister: Sushil Koirala
- Vice President: Paramananda Jha
- Preceded by: established created
- Succeeded by: Arjun Narasingha K.C.

Member of Parliament, Pratinidhi Sabha
- In office 4 March 2018 – 12 September 2026
- Succeeded by: Paras Mani Gelal
- Constituency: Udayapur 1

Member of 1st and 2nd Nepalese Constituent Assembly
- In office 28 May 2008 – 14 October 2017
- Preceded by: Suresh Kumar Rai

Personal details
- Born: 20 March 1949 (age 77) Dingla, Nepal
- Party: Nepali Congress
- Spouse: Dr. Isabella C. Bassignana Khadka
- Parents: Chitra Bahadur Khadka; Dharma Kumari Khadka
- Education: University of Pune (PhD)

Narayan Khadka is a member of Nepali Congress who has served as the Foreign minister of Nepal since 2021. He has worked previously as Minister of Urban Development under Sushil Koirala-led government.

He was a member of the 2nd Nepalese Constituent Assembly. He won the Udayapur–1 seat in 2013 Nepalese Constituent Assembly election from the Nepali Congress. He was appointed as Foreign Minister by President Bidhya Devi Bhandari on 22 September 2021.

== Personal life ==
Narayan Khadka was born on 20 March 1949 in Bhojpur to Chitra Bahadur Khadka and Dharma Kumari Khadka. He has done his Ph.D. in Economics from Pune, India.

== Political career ==
He joined politics in 1967. He had served as the vice-chairman of National Planning Commission of Nepal.

He was also the member of 1st Nepalese Constituent Assembly where he was a member of the National Interest Preservation Committee.
