= Baraha =

Word processing app for Indian languages

- Developer: Sheshadrivasu Chandrasekharan
- Stable release: 10.10.800
- Operating system: Microsoft Windows
- Type: Word processor
- License: Free trial / Proprietary
- Website: www.baraha.com

Baraha is a word processing application for creating documents in Indian languages. It was developed by Sheshadrivasu Chandrasekharan with an intention to provide a software to enable and encourage Indians use their native languages on the computers. Baraha was first released in Kannada in 1998 and later on in other Indian languages. Baraha can be effectively used for creating documents, sending emails and publishing web pages. Baraha uses a transliteration scheme, which allows the user to write any Indian language in Latin text and later convert it to the respective language. Baraha package consists of Baraha, BarahaPad, BarahaIME and FontConvert programs. This package includes TrueType fonts for various Indian languages. The latest full version of the software is not free anymore. The full-featured software requires a registration key, which currently costs $49.95 or ₹3745.

== Languages supported ==
Baraha 10.0 supports Kannada, Devanagari, Tamil, Telugu, Malayalam, Gujarati, Gurumukhi, Bengali, Assamese and Oriya scripts. The following table shows the languages supported.

| Script | Languages |
|---|---|
| Bengali | Bengali, Assamese, Manipuri |
| Devanagari | Hindi, Marathi, Sanskrit, Nepali, Konkani, Kashmiri, Sindhi |
| Gujarati | Gujarati |
| Gurumukhi | Punjabi |
| Kannada | Kannada, Konkani, Tulu, Kodava |
| Malayalam | Malayalam |
| Oriya | Oriya |
| Tamil | Tamil |
| Telugu | Telugu |
