= Tamlichha =

Coordinates: 27°06′21″N 86°39′06″E

Tamlichha ताम्लिछा
- Village development committee
- Interactive map of Tamlichha
- Country: Nepal
- Zone: Sagarmatha Zone
- District: Udayapur District

Population (1991)
  - Total: 2,528
- Time zone: UTC+5:45 (Nepal Time)

Tamlichha is a village development committee in Udayapur District in the Sagarmatha Zone of south-eastern Nepal.

At the time of the 1991 Nepal census it had a population of 2528 people living in 458 individual households.
