= Jante, Nepal =

Jante जाते
- Letang municipality ward 8 and 9
- Location in Nepal
- Coordinates: 26.74°N 87.56°E
- Country: Nepal
- Zone: Koshi Zone
- District: Morang District

Population (1991)
  - Total: 5,622
- Time zone: UTC+5:45 (Nepal Time)
- Area code: 021

Jante is Letang Municipality ward numbers 8 and 9 in the Kosi Zone of south-eastern Nepal.

== Demographics ==
At the time of the 1991 Nepal census it had a population of 5,622 people living in 1,010 households. It contains communities such as Limbu, Rai, Brahmin, Chettri, Magar and Newar. It contains many temples, monasteries and churches.

== Transport ==
It is connected by the Jante-Pathari and Jante-Letang highways.

== Religious fare ==
Jante is known for its high-spirited festivals. In Chasok Tangnam, people play the dholl along with singing Hakpare, Palam, and Khyali. They enjoy ethnic music as well. In Udhauli Uvauli, pray for nature, the universe, bountiful harvest, etc. Many gather at the monastery to pray and celebrate the birthday of Lord Buddha.

The Holi festival of colors takes place around Christmas. Dashain, Nepal's biggest festival, draws people to celebrate. During Tihar, the festival of lights, residents line their homes with diyo (earthen oil lamp), candles and decorative electrical lamps. New Year is gradually becoming celebrated in Jante.

== Education ==
The medium of education is English in all private schools, whereas Nepali is the medium of instruction in government schools up to secondary level. One Christian primary boarding school is run by the Christian community.
