= Udayapur District =

Udayapur District उदयपुर जिल्ला
- District
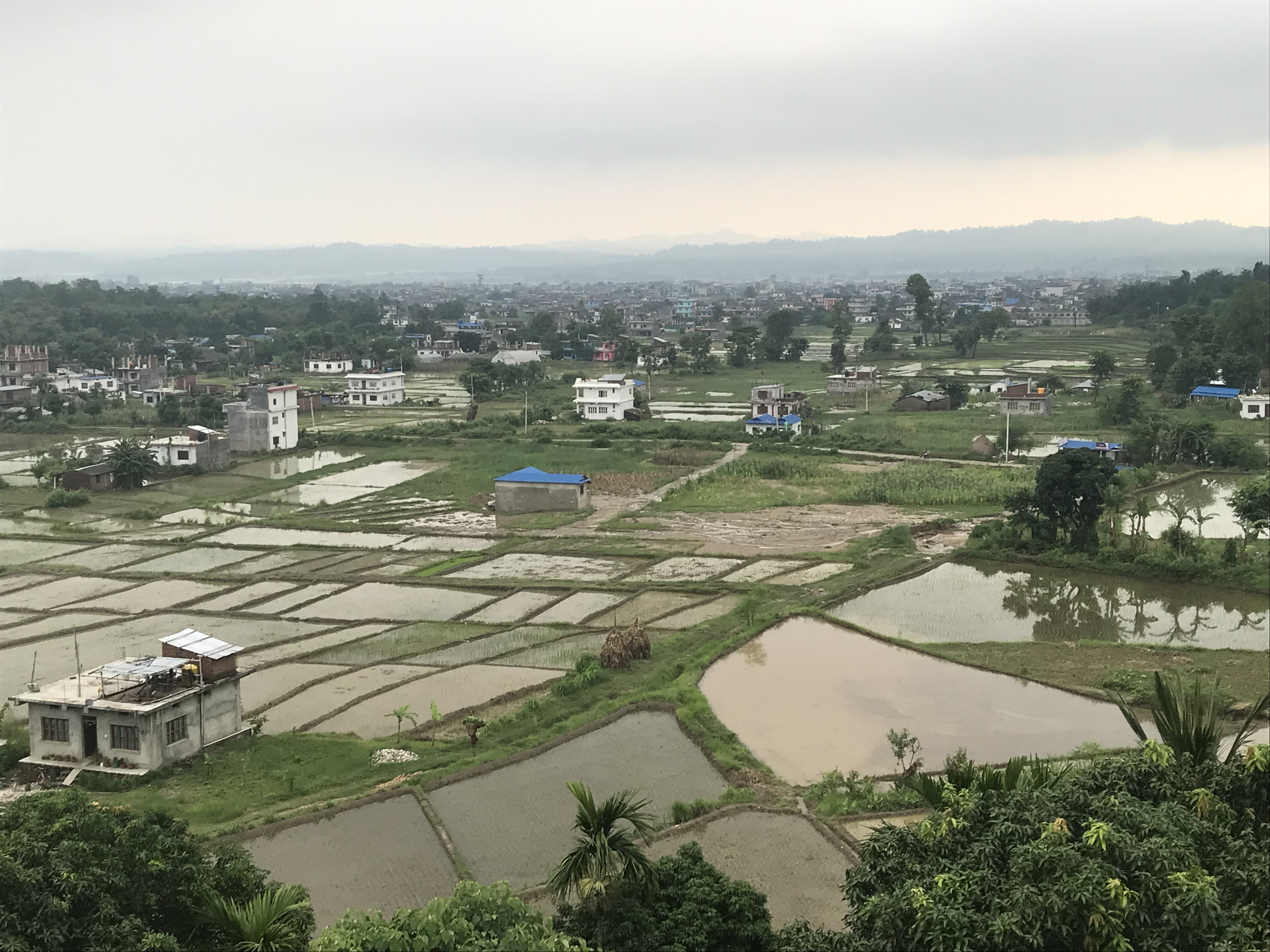
- Gaighat, Headquarter of Udayapur District
- Nickname: ghaighat
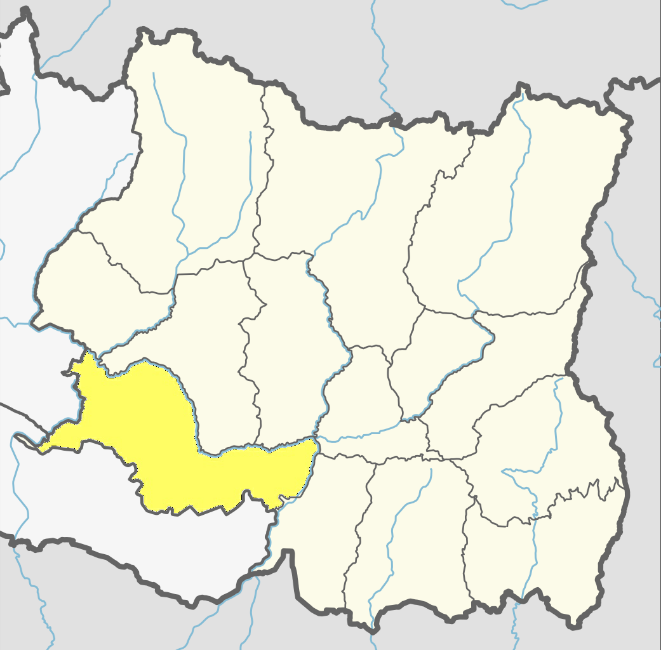
- Udayapur district in Koshi Province

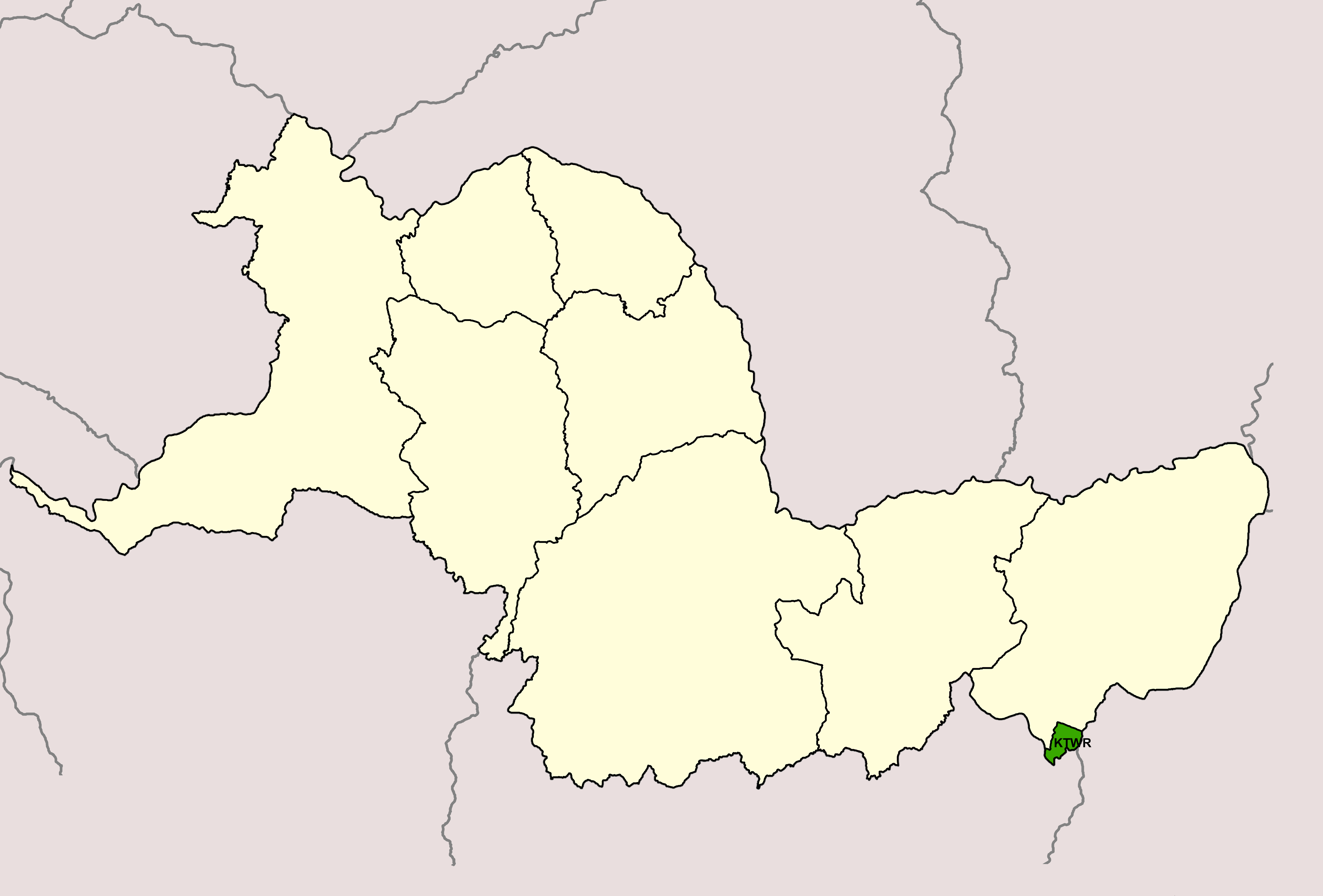
- Political division of Udayapur
- Coordinates: 26°55′N 86°40′E
- Country: Nepal
- Province: Koshi Province
- Established: During Rana regime
- Admin HQ.: Gaighat (Triyuga)
- Municipality: List: Urban; Triyuga; Chaudandigadhi; Belaka; Katari; Rural; Tapli; Limchungbung; Rautamai; Udayapurgadhi

Government
  - Type: Coordination committee
  - Body: DCC, Udayapur
  - Head: Subash karki
  - Deputy-Head: Indira karki
  - Parliamentary constituencies: 2 (UP1 & UP2)
  - Provincial constituencies: 4

Area
  - Total: 2,063 km^{2} (797 sq mi)
- Highest elevation: 2,310 m (7,580 ft)
- Lowest elevation: 360 m (1,180 ft)

Population (2021)
  - Total: 342,773
  - Density: 166.2/km^{2} (430.3/sq mi)
  - Households: 75,937

Demographics
  - Ethnic groups: Chhetri; Rai; Magar; Tharu] people [Tamang
  - Female ♀: 53%
  - Male ♂/100 female: 89.21

Human Development Index
  - Income per capita (US dollars): 920 USD
  - Poverty rate: 29.74
  - Literacy: 69%
  - Life Expectancy: 69.29
- Time zone: UTC+05:45 (NPT)
- Postal Codes: 56300, 56301, 56302, 56303, 56305, 56306... 56312
- Telephone Code: 035
- Main Language(s): Nepali, Magar, Tharu,
- Major highways: Sagarmatha
- Website: ddcudayapur.gov.np

Udayapur District (Nepali: उदयपुर जिल्ला, is one of the 14 districts of Koshi Province in eastern Nepal. The district, with Triyuga as its district headquarters, covers an area of 2,063 km^{2} (797 sq mi) and in 2001 had a population of 287,689, in 2011 of 317,532, in 2021 of 342,773

Rivers and hills form natural borders for Udayapur District. The Koshi River to the east separates it from Sunsari District and the Sun Kosi River to the north separates it from Bhojpur and Khotang Districts. The Tawa Khola separates it from Sindhuli District to the west and the Siwalik foothills to the south separate it from the outer Tarai of Siraha and Saptari. The Koshi Tappu Wildlife Reserve lies to the east in Udayapur, Sunsari and Saptari Districts.

According to the former administrative divisions of Nepal, Udayapur falls in Eastern Development Region in Sagarmatha Zone.

== History ==
Before the unification of modern Nepal by Shah kings. Udayapur District was under Sen dynasty. The Kingdom name was Chaudandi and capital of the Kingdom was chaudandigadhi. The last king of the Chaudandi was Karna Sen who fled to Bijayapur when Gorkha army evaded and captured the Sen Kingdom Chaudandi.

Before 1972, Panchawati was Headquarter of Udayapur District, it moved to Gaighat in 1972.

== Geography and Climate ==
Udayapur district is surrounded by Mahabharat hills from north and Shiwalik from south, whereas both hills meet together by west which forms the region a valley Udayapur Valley. Udayapur valley is about 30 km (19 mi) long and from 2 to 4 km (1.2 to 2.5 mi) wide, it is drained by the Triyuga river flowing east to join the Koshi river.

Forest cover takes up 67% of the total land area of the district. 28% of the land is cultivated. Small and large river and ponds remain the main source of water in the district. Ponds like Rauta Pokhari, Suke Pokhari, Tapli Pokhari, Jogidaha Chure Forest Pond and Jhilke Pokhari are key water resources in the district. The district does not possess larger lakes. Triyuga is the largest river in this district. Other two major rivers are Tawa Khola from Western side and Vaidyanath River from mid-side unite with Tawa River. Other rivers in the district are Kakaru Khola, Yari Khola, Rakula, Baruwa Khola, Andheri, Bahadura Khola and Rasuwa Khola. Sunkosi, Saptakosie, Kamala rivers lie on the district border.

This inner Terai district (low mid-hills) covers elevations between 360 metres to 2,310 metres above sea level. Different topography, geology and altitude have established three distinct physiographic zones in the district as mentioned below.

=== Mahabharat hills ===
Mahabharat hill range in this district stretches from Sun Kosi River on northern side and links to Inner Terai and in some stretches, to Churiya hills. About 60% of the district is covered by middle hills with steep slope and rugged mountain topography. From nearly 1,100 m to 2,310 m, this land consists of high hills like Lekhani, Majhkharka, Rautapokhari.

=== Churiya hills ===
The Churiya hills stretch across elevations between 550 m to 1100 m. reaching from the upper Mahabharata to Terai land in the south leaving some plain inner Tarai land in between. It occupies about 9% of land of the district and consists of small valleys of inner Terai including Nepaltar, Murkuchi and Mainatar as well as plains like Bahuntar, Bhuttar, and Hardeni. These valleys are situated on Panchawati, Rauta, Bayaldanda and Tawashri VDC respectively.

=== Inner Terai region ===
This region occupies around 31% of the district at elevations between 360m to 550 m above sea level. This region is mainly situated on the border of Triyuga and Tawa River. Where inner Tarai exists the Churiya range lies to the south of this region. This region is highly affected by the problem of river cutting or floods. Major places of district like Gaighat, Katari and Beltar lie in this region.

| Climate Zone | Elevation Range | % of Area |
|---|---|---|
| Lower Tropical | below 300 meters (1,000 ft) | 33.7% |
| Upper Tropical | 300 to 1,000 meters 1,000 to 3,300 ft. | 45.9% |
| Subtropical | 1,000 to 2,000 meters 3,300 to 6,600 ft. | 17.8% |
| Temperate | 2,000 to 3,000 meters 6,400 to 9,800 ft. | 0.5% |

== Demographics ==
At the 2021 Nepal census, Udayapur District had 81,089 households and a population of 340,721. 8.14% of the population was under 5 years of age. Udayapur had a literacy rate of 77.42% and a sex ratio of 1081 females per 1,000 males. 266,906 (78.33%) lived in urban areas.

Ethnicity/caste of Udayapur district (2021)
1. Rai (22.3%)
2. Chhetri (16.4%)
3. Magar (13.3%)
4. Tharu (7.67%)
5. Tamang (6.86%)
6. Kami (5.48%)
7. Bahun (4.79%)
8. Newar (3.53%)
9. Danuwar (3.05%)
10. Damai (2.91%)
11. Sarki (2.73%)
12. Musahar (1.31%)
13. Manjhi (1.04%)
14. Other Hill Janjati (3.39%)
15. Madheshi non-Dalit (2.79%)
16. Other Khas (1.21%)
17. Others (1.24%)

Ethnicity/caste:Hil Janjatis are the largest single grouping, with 44% of the population. Rai people are the largest Janjati group, followed by Magars and Tamang. There is a population of plains ethnic groups: mostly Tharu but also some Madheshi people.

Languages of Udayapur district (2021)
1. Nepali (51.3%)
2. Magar Dhut (11.0%)
3. Tharu (7.96%)
4. Chamling (6.86%)
5. Tamang (5.45%)
6. Maithili (3.84%)
7. Bantawa (3.63%)
8. Rai (1.92%)
9. Newar (1.67%)
10. Danuwar (1.46%)
11. Others (4.87%)

As their first language, 51.30% of the population spoke Nepali, 11.04% Magar Dhut, 7.96% Tharu, 6.86% Chamling, 5.45% Tamang, 3.84% Maithili, 3.63% Bantawa, 1.92% Rai, 1.67% Newar and 1.46% Danuwar as their first language. In 2011, Nepali was spoken by 51.7% of the population as their first language.

Religion in Udayapur District (2021)
| Religion | Percent |
| Hinduism | 70.37% |
| Kirat Mundhum | 12.97% |
| Buddhism | 11.68% |
| Christianity | 2.95% |
| Prakriti | 1.22% |
| Islam | 0.80% |
| Other or not stated | 0.01% |

Religion: 52.20% were Hindu, 36.20% Kirati, 8.34% Buddhist, 3.07% Christian, 0.1% Prakriti and 0.3% others.

== Administration ==
Udayapur District is administered by Udayapur District Coordination Committee (Udayapur DCC). The Udayapur DCC is elected by Udayapur District Assembly. The head of Udayapur DCC is Mr. Khadag Bahadur Pariyar (Darnal) and Mrs. Ganga Rai is deputy head of Udayapur DCC.

Udayapur District Administration Office under Ministry of Home Affairs co-operate with Udayapur DCC to maintain peace, order and security in the district. The officer of District Administration office called CDO and current CDO of Udayapur DAO is Bishnu Kumar Karkee.

Udayapur District Court is a Judicial court to see the cases of people on district level.

== Division ==
Udayapur District is divided into total 8 local level bodies, 4 local level body categorized into Rural municipality and 4 into Municipality:

| # | Local body | Nepali | Population (2021) | Area (KM^{2}) | Mayor | Deputy Mayor | Wards | Web |
|---|---|---|---|---|---|---|---|---|
| 1 | Triyuga | त्रियुगा | 104,375 | 547.43 | Basanta Kumar Basnet | Maheswori Rai | 16 | |
| 2 | Katari | कटारी | 60,168 | 424.89 | Gyanendra Shresth | Bheem Kumari Rawat | 14 | |
| 3 | Chaudandigadhi | चौदण्डीगढी | 53,537 | 283.78 | Khagendra Rai | Rita Kumari Chaudhari | 10 | |
| 4 | Belaka | बेलका | 51,458 | 344.73 | Durga Kumar Thapa | Rajkumari Chaudhari | 9 | |
| 5 | Udayapurgadhi | उदयपुरगढी | 28,929 | 209.51 | Manbahadur Kepchaki Magar | Sanu Raut | 8 | |
| 6 | Rautamai | रौतामाई | 20,418 | 204.08 | Gajendra Kumar Khadka | Kumari Jyu Thakuri | 8 | |
| 7 | Tapli | ताप्ली | 13,377 | 119.11 | Dhunggaraj bk | dhana magar | 5 | |
| 8 | Limchungbung | लिम्चुङबुङ | 9,781 | 106.8 | Mejar Kumar Rai | Puspalal Rai | 5 | |
| | Udayapur | उदयपुर | 342,773 | 2300.33 | Khadag Bahadur Pariyar | Ganga Rai | 75 | |

=== Former Administrative Divisions ===
Formerly, Udayapur had three municipality and many VDCs. VDCs were the local administrative units for villages.

Fulfilling the requirement of the new constitution of Nepal 2015, on 10 March 2017 all VDCs were nullified and formed new units after grouping VDCs.

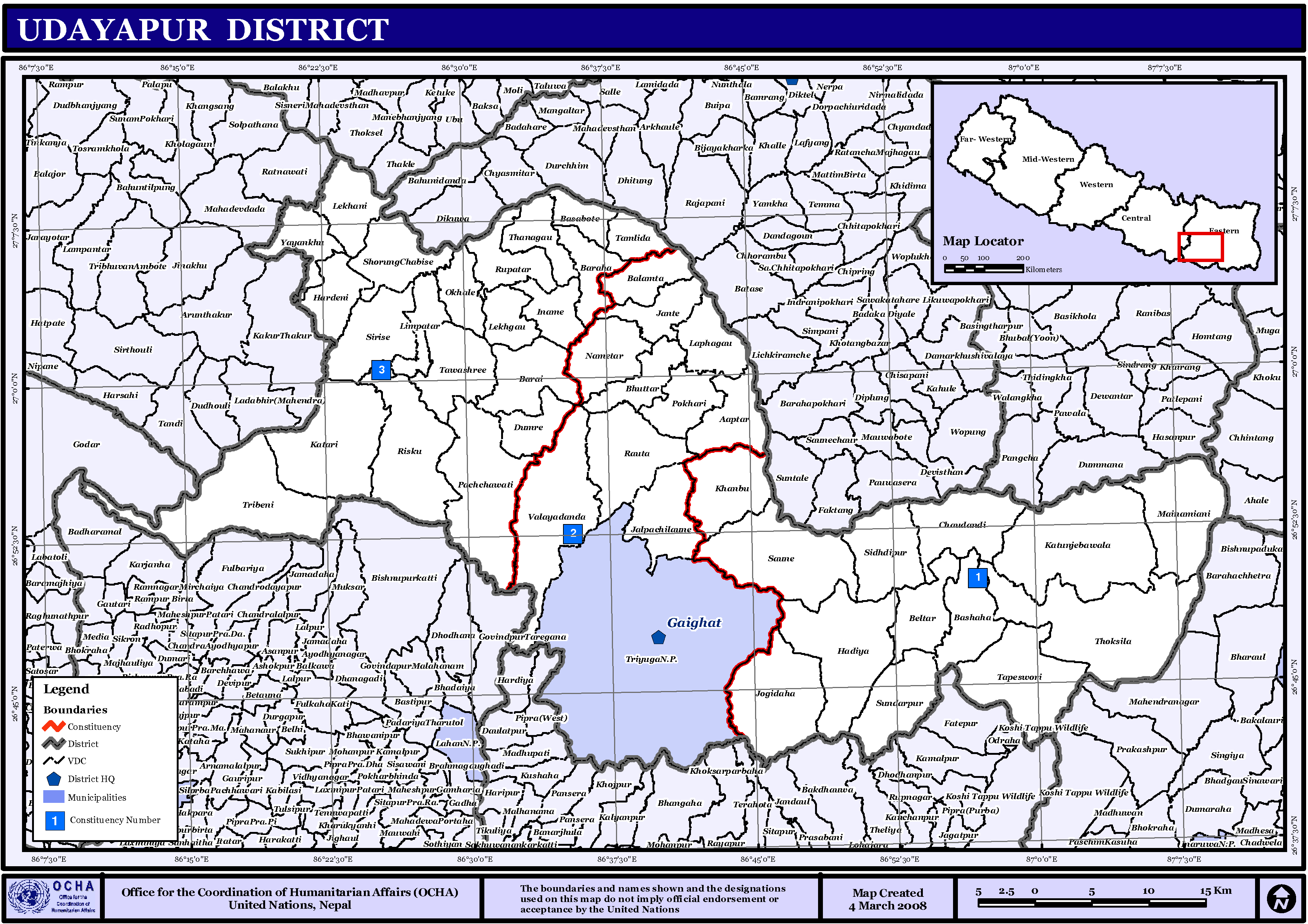
Map of the VDCs and Municipalities (blue) in Udayapur District

| New adm. units | Former VDCs |
|---|---|
| Katari municipality | Former Katari Municipality, Triveni, Risku, Lekhani, Mayankhu, Hardeni, Limpatar, Shorung Chabise and Sirise |
| Chaudandigadhi municipality | Beltar Basaha Municipality, Chaudandi, Sithdipur, Hadiya and Sundarpur |
| Triyuga municipality | former Triyuga municipality, Jogidaha, Saune, Khanbu and Jalpachilaune |
| Belaka municipality | Tapeshwari, Rampur Thoksila, Mainamaini and Katunjebawala |
| Udayapurgadhi gaunpalika | Panchawati, Bhalayadanda, Tawasri, Dumre and Barre |
| Tapli gaunpalika | Rupatar, Thanagaun, Iname, Okhale and Lekhgaun |
| Rautamai gaunpalika | Nametar, Bhuttar, Laphagaun, Pokhari, Rauta and Aaptar |
| Limchungbung | Basabote, Tamlichha, Baraha, Balamta and Jante |

== Constituencies ==
Udayapur District is divided into 2 Parliamentary constituencies and 4 Provincial constituencies:

| Name of cons. | Incorporated areas | Type of cons. | MP/MLA | Party |
|---|---|---|---|---|
| Udayapur 1 | Triyuga ● Chaudandigadhi ● Belaka | Parliamentary constituency | Narayan Khadka | Nepali Congress |
| Udayapur 2 | Katari ● Udayapurgadhi ● Rautamai ● Tapli ● Limchungbung | Parliamentary cons. | Suresh Kumar Rai | Nepal Communist Party |
| Udayapur 1(A) | Chaudandigadhi● Belaka | Provincial cons. | Bimal Karki | Nepal Communist Party |
| Udayapur 1(B) | Triyuga | Provincial cons. | Himal Karki | Nepali Congress |
| Udayapur 2(A) | Udayapurgadhi ● Rautamai ● Limchungbung | Provincial cons. | Narayan Bahadur Magar | Independent |
| Udayapur 2(B) | Katari ● Tapli | Provincial cons. | Kala Ghale | Nepal Communist Party |

== Transportation ==
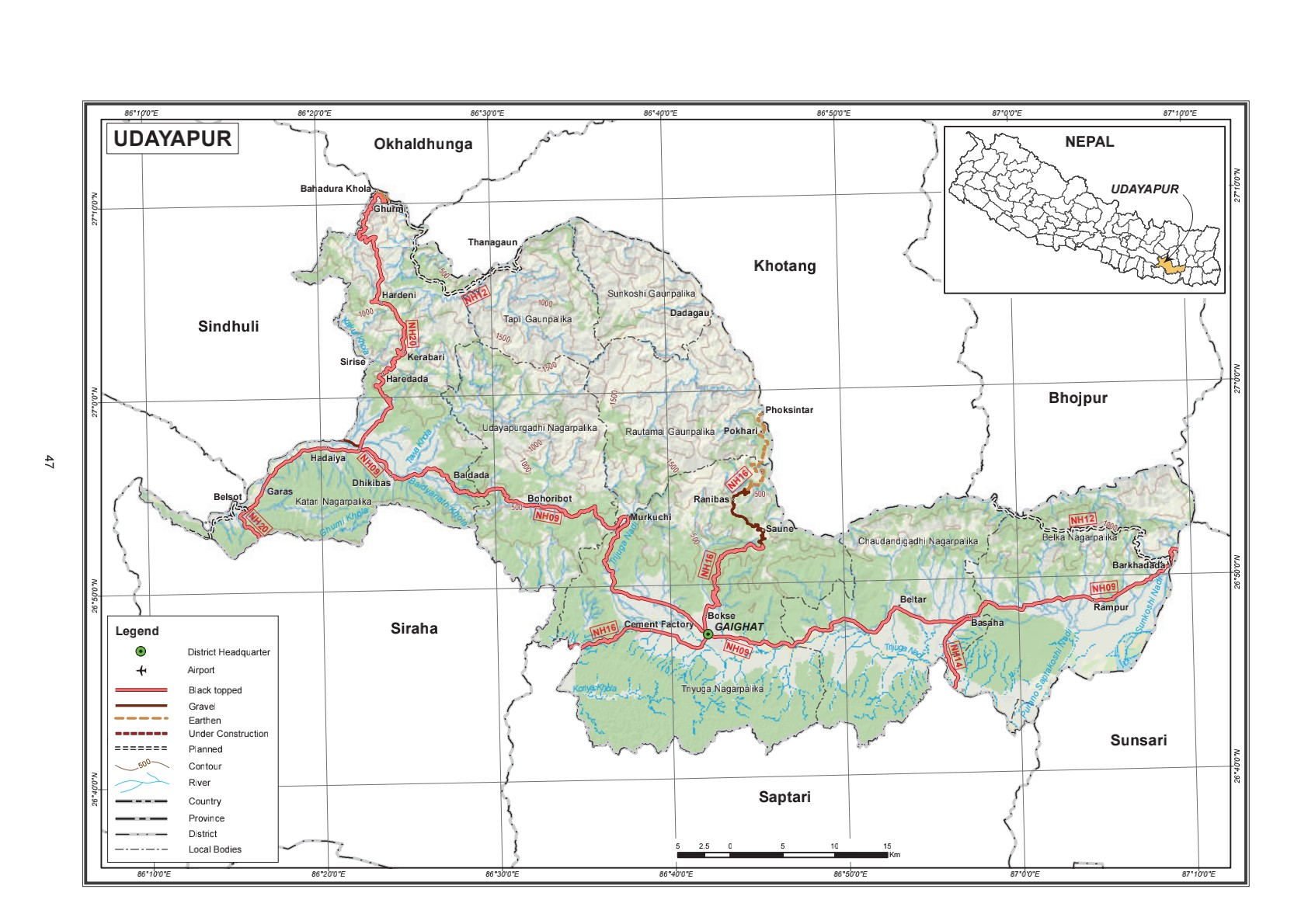
Road and Highway map of Udayapur District, Nepal

Gaighat, the headquarter (center) of Udaydpur District is connected with NH-16 (Sagarmatha Highway), which connects Udayapur with NH-01 (East-west Highway) at Kadmaha. Kadmaha is 28 km (17 mi) at distance from Gaighat. The NH-16 also connects Gaighat to Khotang which is 127 km (79 mi) at distance from Gaighat but the road is not paved.

NH-09 (Madan Bhandari Highway) connects Gaighat to Chatara via Beltar, Basaha at 70 km (43 mi) at distance in east which is across the Koshi river. The NH-09 also connects Sindhuli via Udayapurgadhi and Katari.

There are some other National Highways that connects Gaighat to the othe nearer destinations. The other Highways are: NH-14 (Basaha to Kunauli Border), NH-20 (Mirchaiya to Okhaldhunga and Diktel via Katari) and NH-12.

== Interesting Places ==
- Tribeni: It is a place in Katari municipality where the three rivers Kamla, Tawa and Dudhauli adjoins. It is visited by many devotees on the occasion of Makar (Maghe) Sankrati (first day of Nepali month of Magh) every year. On this occasion, a large fair is organized that lasts for about three weeks.
- Rauta: Rauta is a holy place for Hindus located in Rautamai rural municipality. It is located on Mahabharat hills at the election of 2,000 feet (610 m) from sea level. There is a temple of Mahadev and a Pond called Rauta Pokhari. The pond is in the center of surrounded evergreen tall forest.
- Koshi Tappu: Koshi Tappu is a protected area for wildlife. It is located in south-eastern part of Udayapur near Koshi River. Rampur is the nearest city in Udayapur from Koshi Tappu .
- Chaudandigadhi Durbar: The remains of Chaudandigadhi fort of Sen Kingdom can be seen in Chaudandi. The kingdom of Chaudandigadhi was captured by Gorkha Army on 16 July 1773. The remains of Chaudandigadhi is now part of Chaudandigadhi municipality.
- Odari kholako jharna" (156m) (waterfall)
- Khuwa jharna"(71m). (waterfall)

== See also ==
- Administration in Province No. 1
- Zones of Nepal
- Districts of Nepal
