= List of monuments in Saptari, Nepal =

Monuments in Nepal

This is a list of monuments in Saptari District, Nepal as officially recognized by and available through the website of the Department of Archaeology, Nepal. Saptari is a districts of Province No. 2 and is located in south-eastern Nepal. Hindu temples are the main attraction of this district.

== List of monuments ==
ID	Name	Type	Location	District	Coordinates	Image
NP-SAP-01	Chinnamasta Bhagawati		Chinnamasta	Saptari	26°27′03″N 86°43′51″E	Chinnamasta Bhagawati Upload Photo
NP-SAP-02	Kankalini Temple		Bhardah	Saptari	26°33′04″N 86°53′33″E	Kankalini Temple Upload Photo
NP-SAP-03	Shambhunath Temple		Sambhunath Municipality	Saptari	26°37′44″N 86°41′07″E	Shambhunath Temple Upload Photo
NP-SAP-04	Ekagarh Ancient Temple		Khoksar	Saptari	26°37′57″N 86°42′43″E	Upload Photo Upload Photo
NP-SAP-05	Som Dynasty Palace			Saptari		Upload Photo Upload Photo
NP-SAP-06	Shree Ram Temple			Saptari		Upload Photo Upload Photo
NP-SAP-07	Bishnu Temple			Saptari		Bishnu Temple Upload Photo
NP-SAP-08	Chandrabhoga Gadhi			Saptari	26°38′24″N 86°28′48″E	Chandrabhoga Gadhi Upload Photo
NP-SAP-09	Bhagwati Temple		Rajbiraj	Saptari	26°32′27″N 86°44′48″E	Bhagwati Temple Upload Photo
NP-SAP-10	Dharmeshwar Mahadev Temple			Saptari	26°32′27″N 86°44′49″E	Dharmeshwar Mahadev Temple Upload Photo
NP-SAP-11	Khojpur Ancient Temple			Saptari		Khojpur Ancient Temple Upload Photo
NP-SAP-12	Laleshwarnath Temple			Saptari		Laleshwarnath Temple Upload Photo
NP-SAP-13	Hanuman Temple (Black Statue)		Hanumannagar	Saptari	26°30′13″N 86°51′14″E	Hanuman Temple (Black Statue) Upload Photo
NP-SAP-14	Shree Radha Krishna Temple (Statue of Radha and Krishna)		Rajbiraj	Saptari	26°34′26″N 86°43′54″E	Shree Radha Krishna Temple (Statue of Radha and Krishna) Upload Photo
NP-SAP-15	Shree Hanuman Temple		Rajbiraj	Saptari	26°32′28″N 86°44′48″E	Shree Hanuman Temple Upload Photo
NP-SAP-16	Harinandeshwar Mahadev Mandir		Rajbiraj	Saptari	26°32′37″N 86°44′41″E	Harinandeshwar Mahadev Mandir Upload Photo
NP-SAP-17	Hanuman Temple		Rajbiraj, Ward-1	Saptari	26°33′03″N 86°44′18″E	Hanuman Temple Upload Photo
NP-SAP-18	Krishna Temple		Center of vegetable market (Hatiya), Rajbiraj	Saptari	26°32′59″N 86°44′47″E	Upload Photo Upload Photo
NP-SAP-19	Rajdevi Temple		near Rajdevi School, Rajbiraj	Saptari	26°32′33″N 86°45′23″E	Rajdevi Temple Upload Photo
NP-SAP-20	Bageshwori Temple		on the way of Chinnamasta Temple, Rajbiraj	Saptari	26°27′03″N 86°40′53″E	Bageshwori Temple Upload Photo
NP-SAP-21	Maa Vaishnawi Kali Temple		Rajbiraj	Saptari	26°32′30″N 86°44′59″E	Maa Vaishnawi Kali Temple Upload Photo
NP-SAP-22	Koshi Barrage		Bhardah	Saptari	26°31′35″N 86°55′37″E	Koshi Barrage Upload Photo
NP-SAP-23	Dakneshwori Temple		Pato, Dakneshwori Municipality	Saptari	26°30′42″N 86°37′21″E	Dakneshwori Temple Upload Photo

== See also ==
- List of monuments in Province No. 2
- List of monuments in Nepal
