= List of monuments in Narayani Zone =

Narayani Zone was one of the fourteen zones of Nepal, comprising five districts, namely, Bara, Chitwan, Makwanpur, Parsa and Rautahat. Here is district wise List of Monuments which is in the Narayani Zone.

== Narayani Zone ==
- List of monuments in Bara District
- List of monuments in Chitwan District
- List of monuments in Makwanpur District
- List of monuments in Parsa District
- List of monuments in Rautahat District
