= Saptari 3 =

Parliamentary constituency in Nepal

- Parliamentary constituency
- The map of Saptari 3 constituency in Saptari district

- The map of Saptari 3(A) and Saptari 3(B) provincial constituency in Saptari
- Province: Madhesh Province
- District: Saptari District
- Population: 177,715 (2021)
- Electorate: 111,871 (21 November 2025)
- Major settlements: Rupani Rural Municipality, Bishnupur Rural Municipality, Rajgadh Rural Municipality, Sambhunath Municipality and Dakneshwari Municipality

Current constituency
- Created: 1991
- Party: RSP
- Member of Parliament: Amarkant Chaudhary
- MPA 3(A): Mohammad Samim Congress
- MPA 3(B): Shambhu Kumar Sah Janamat

Saptari 3 is one of four parliamentary constituencies of Saptari District in Nepal. This constituency came into existence on the Constituency Delimitation Commission (CDC) report submitted on 31 August 2017.In 2026, Amarkant Chaudhary of Rastriya Swatantra Party won the parliamentary election from this constituency.

== Incorporated areas ==
Saptari 3 incorporates Rupani Rural Municipality, Bishnupur Rural Municipality, Belhi Chapena Rural Municipality, Sambhunath Municipality and Dakneshwari Municipality.

== Assembly segments ==
It encompasses the following Provincial Assembly of Madhesh Province segment

- Saptari 3(A)
- Saptari 3(B)

== Members of Parliament ==
=== Parliament/Constituent Assembly ===
Election	Member	Party
1991	Hari Prasad Raya Amat	Nepali Congress
1994	Anish Ansari	Nepal Sadbhawana Party
1999	Renu Kumari Yadav	Rastriya Prajatantra Party
2008	Mahesh Prasad Yadav	Sadbhavana Party
2011	Mahesh Prasad Yadav	Sangiya Sadbhavana Party
2013	Umesh Kumar Yadav	UCPN (Maoist)
April 2016	Umesh Kumar Yadav	CPN (Maoist Centre)
2017	Chandra Kanta Chaudhary	Rastriya Janata Party Nepal
April 2020	Chandra Kanta Chaudhary	People's Socialist Party, Nepal
August 2021	Chandra Kanta Chaudhary	Loktantrik Samajwadi Party, Nepal
2022	Dinesh Kumar Yadav	Nepali Congress
2026	Amarkant Chaudhary	Rastriya Swatantra Party

=== Provincial Assembly ===
==== 3(A) ====
Election	Member	Party
2017	Mohammad Samim	Nepali Congress
2022	Mohammad Samim	Nepali Congress

==== 3(B) ====
Election	Member	Party
2017	Bidheshwor Prasad Yadav	Rastriya Janata Party Nepal
April 2020	Bidheshwor Prasad Yadav	People's Socialist Party, Nepal
2022	Shambhu Kumar Sah	Janamat Party

== Election results ==
=== Election in the 2020s ===
==== 2026 general election ====
Candidate	Party	Votes	%
Amarkant Chaudhary	Rastriya Swatantra Party	32,875	47.44
Upendra Yadav	People's Socialist Party, Nepal	15,239	21.99
Dinesh Kumar Yadav	Nepali Congress	8,428	12.16
Tarakant Chaudhary	CPN-UML	6,715	9.69
Surendra Prasad Sharma	Janamat Party	2,868	4.14
Others		3,171	4.58
Total		69,296	100.00
Valid votes		69,296	92.85
Invalid/blank votes		5,334	7.15
Total votes		74,630	100.00
Registered voters/turnout		111,871	66.71
Majority		17,636	
Rastriya Swatantra Party gain			
Source:,GorkhaPatra

==== 2022 general election ====
Candidate	Party	Votes	%
Dinesh Kumar Yadav	Nepali Congress	26,166	39.16
Tarakant Chaudhary	CPN (UML)	22,300	33.37
Anish Ansari	Janamat Party	15,114	22.62
Others		3,246	4.86
Total		66,826	100.00
Majority		3,866	
Nepali Congress gain			

==== 3(A) ====
Party	Candidate	Votes
Nepali Congress	Mohammad Samim	10,630
Janamat Party	Ram Prasad Mandal Rajdhob	8,538
CPN-UML	Jogendra Bhagat	7,341
Others		5,280
Invalid votes
Result	Nepali Congress hold	
Source:Election Commission:

===== 3(B) =====
Party	Candidate	Votes
Janamat Party	Shambhu Kumar Sah	10,862
People's Socialist Party, Nepal	Bidheshwor Prasad Yadav	10,814
Nepali Congress	Bhagwati Prasad Yadav	9,201
Others		2,189
Invalid votes
Result	Janamat Party gain	
Source:Election Commission

=== Election in the 2010s ===
==== 2017 legislative elections ====
Party	Candidate	Votes
Rastriya Janata Party Nepal	Chandra Kanta Chaudhary	22,584
Nepali Congress	Dinesh Kumar Yadav	19,401
CPN (Unified Marxist–Leninist)	Tara Kanta Chaudhary	11,188
Others		2,084
Invalid votes		4,718
Result	RJPN gain	
Source: Election Commission

==== 2017 Nepalese provincial elections ====
===== 3(A) =====
Party	Candidate	Votes
Nepali Congress	Mohammad Samim	11,628
Federal Socialist Forum, Nepal	Dinesh Kumar Yadav	9,979
CPN (Unified Marxist–Leninist)	Mahendra Prasad Chaudhary	4,602
Others		1,872
Invalid votes		2,397
Result	Congress gain	
Source: Election Commission

===== 3(B) =====
Party	Candidate	Votes
Rastriya Janata Party Nepal	Bidheshwor Prasad Yadav	10,328
Nepali Congress	Bhagwati Prasad Yadav	6,212
CPN (Unified Marxist–Leninist)	Abdul Majid Sakir	5,573
Independent	Surendra Prasad Yadav	2,772
Naya Shakti Party, Nepal	Dambar Narayan Sah Teli	1,094
Others		1,448
Invalid votes		1,963
Result	RJPN gain	
Source: Election Commission

==== 2013 Constituent Assembly election ====
Party	Candidate	Votes
UCPN (Maoist)	Umesh Kumar Yadav	8,746
Madhesi Jana Adhikar Forum, Nepal	Shailendra Prasad Sah	6,487
Terai Madhesh Loktantrik Party	Jay Prakash Thakur	4,553
Nepali Congress	Ram Kumar Chaudhary	3,896
Sadbhavana Party	Anish Ansari	3,595
Rastriya Prajatantra Party Nepal	Parmeshwar Sah Teli	1,081
Others		7,283
Result	Maoist gain	
Source: NepalNews

=== Election in the 2000s ===
==== 2008 Constituent Assembly election ====
Party	Candidate	Votes
Sadbhavana Party	Mahesh Prasad Yadav	10,302
Terai Madhesh Loktantrik Party	Anish Ansari	6,921
Nepali Congress	Ram Kumar Chaudhary	6,744
CPN (Maoist)	Umesh Kumar Yadav	5,513
Madhesi Jana Adhikar Forum, Nepal	Ra Dular Sah	3,527
CPN (Unified Marxist–Leninist)	Ranju Thakur	2,244
Nepal Loktantrik Samajbadi Dal	Purna Prasad Chaudhary	1,608
Dalit Janajati Party	Jhabar Ram	1,436
Rastriya Prajatantra Party	Govinda Prasad Singh	1,386
Independent	Satya Narayan Mandal	1,196
Independent	Ganga Ram Yadav	1,304
Others		4,332
Invalid votes		4,267
Result	Sadbhavana gain	
Source: Election Commission

=== Election in the 1990s ===
==== 1999 legislative elections ====
Party	Candidate	Votes
Rastriya Prajatantra Party	Renu Kumari Yadav	17,231
CPN (Unified Marxist–Leninist)	Suman Raj Pyakurel	10,910
Nepali Congress	Anish Ansari	10,803
Nepal Sadbhawana Party	Surya Narayan Mandal	10,126
Others		2,699
Invalid Votes		1,914
Result	RPP gain	
Source: Election Commission

==== 1994 legislative elections ====
Party	Candidate	Votes
Nepal Sadbhawana Party	Anish Ansari	12,743
Independent	Surya Narayan Mandal	8,921
Rastriya Prajatantra Party	Renu Kumari Yadav	6,411
Nepali Congress	Dev Narayan Yadav	5,431
CPN (Unified Marxist–Leninist)	Jaya Krishna Goit	5,367
Independent	Shiva Prasad Pokharel	2,590
Others		999
Result	NSP gain	
Source: Election Commission

==== 1991 legislative elections ====
Party	Candidate	Votes
Nepali Congress	Hari Prasad Raya Amat	11,251
Nepal Sadbhawana Party	Anish Ansari	9,932
Result	Congress gain	

== See also ==
- List of parliamentary constituencies of Nepal
