= Bhangha =

Former Village Development Committee in Nepal

Coordinates: 26°39′N 86°39′E

Bhangha भाङ्घा
- Interactive map of Bhangha
- Country: Nepal
- Zone: Sagarmatha Zone
- District: Saptari District

Population (1991)
  - Total: 4,281
- Time zone: UTC+5:45 (Nepal Time)

Bhangha is a market center and town in Sambhunath Municipality in Saptari District in the Sagarmatha Zone of south-eastern Nepal. The formerly VDC was merged along with Khoksar Parbaha, Sambhunath, Mohanpur, Bhangha, Basbalpur and Rampur Jamuwa village development committee new municipality was formed on 18 May 2014. At the time of the 1991 Nepal census it had a population of 4281 people living in 750 individual households.
