= Khando River =

River in Nepal

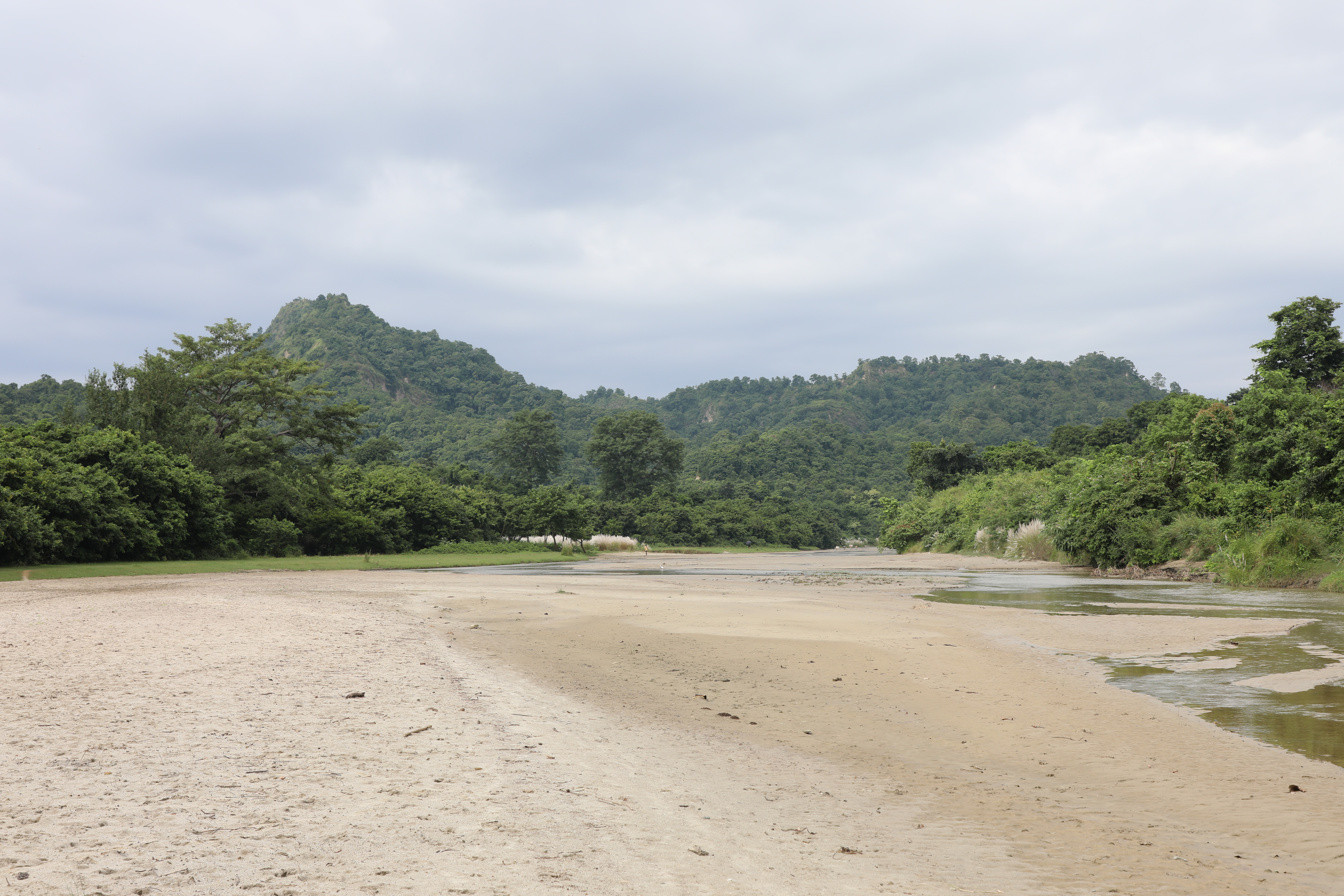
- Khado River at Kanakpatti Area, Shambhunath

Location
- Country: Nepal
- District: Saptari district
- Major settlements: Shambhunath, Rupani, Agnisair Krishnasavaran, Rajbiraj, Tilathi Koiladi

Physical characteristics
- Source
  - location: Sivalik Hills, Shambhunath, Saptari
  - coordinates: 26.672235°N 86.714479°E
  - elevation: 419 m (1,375 ft)
- Mouth
  - location: Tilathi Koiladi, Saptari
  - coordinates: 26.467990°N 86.776527°E
  - elevation: 68 m (223 ft)
- Length: 25.246 km (15.687 mi)
- Basin size: 117 km^{2} (45 mi^{2})

The Khando River (Nepali: खाँडो नदी) is a river originating from the Churia hills region of Shambhunath and flows up to Tilathi Koiladi, Saptari. The river is 25.246 km (15.687 mi) long and drains an area of about 117 km^{2} (45 mi^{2}) in Saptari district.

== Floods ==
The Khando River is known as the "Sorrow of Saptari" as the annual floods affect the fertile agricultural lands of Shambhunath, Rupani, Agnisair Krishnasavaran, Rajbiraj, Tilathi Koiladi.
