= Kanakpatti Palace =

- Devanagari: कनकपट्टी दरबार
- Interactive map of Kanakpatti Palace
- 26.65517°N 86.66256°E
- Type: Palace and fort complex
- Location: Kanakpatti, Shambhunath, Nepal

History
- Founder: Senas of Makwanpur
- Built: 13th century - 14th century

Site notes
- Area: 50 acres (20 ha)
- Excavation dates: December 16, 2004 - March 13, 2005
- Archaeologists: Prakash Darnal (Department of Archaeology)
- Condition: ruin
- Owner: Government of Nepal
- Management: Department of Archaeology
- Public access: limited, conserved

Kanakpatti Palace (Devanagari: कनकपट्टी दरबार) also known as Ekagarh Palace was winter capital and ruin of a royal palace of Sena King Chandraketu, located on the bank of Khando River in Kanakpatti village of Shambhunath in Saptari district, Nepal. The palace was established in early 13th to 14th century in Chure hill section of Saptari district.The ruins of the palace are spread over an area of 50 acres (20 ha) and 16 kilometres (9.9 mi) east of district headquarters Rajbiraj.

== History ==
The Sena dynasty in Bengal fell in the early 13th century, and one of their descendants proceeded to Mithila, crossing the Kosi River. The Sena dynasty of Makwanpur was originally settled in Rupnagar (modern-day Saptari district) in the first half of the 13th century. They slowly expanded their rule up to Makwanpur region. Sena King Chandraketu established the Kanakpatti Palace in the early 13th century as his winter capital seat. The fortification of Kanakpatti is similar to Chaudandi Gadhi and Chandrabhoga Gadhi.

== Archaeological excavation ==
In the rainy season of 1997, a nearby Ekagarhi stream flooded and washed away the southwest part of the present structure. The Archaeology Department constructed a gabion wall to protect the current structure from further damage. The archaeological excavation was carried out from December 16, 2004 to March 13, 2005, headed by archaeologist Prakash Darnal of the Department of Archaeology. The site has a 0.5 kilometres (0.31 mi) outer wall parallel to the structure, a walled alignment to the west-north and four ruin monuments. The excavation team also found a stone structure of a Hindu god and goddess, terracotta chilim, ghada, hukka and a couple of ancient wells from the site.
