= Chandra Kanta Chaudhary =

Nepali politician

- चन्द्रकान्त चौधरी

State Minister of Energy, Water Resources and Irrigation
- In office 4 June 2021 – 21 June 2021
- President: Bidya Devi Bhandari
- Prime Minister: KP Sharma Oli

Member of Parliament, Pratinidhi Sabha
- In office 4 March 2018 – 18 September 2022
- Preceded by: Umesh Kumar Yadav
- Succeeded by: Dinesh Kumar Yadav
- Constituency: Saptari 3

Personal details
- Born: 1947
- Died: January 10, 2026 (aged 78–79) Dakneshwori, Nepal
- Party: Loktantrik Samajwadi
- Other political affiliations: RJPN; PSP-N
- Relatives: Amarkant Chaudhary (son)

Chandra Kanta Chaudhary (1947 – 10 January 2026) was a Nepalese politician and former state minister of energy, water resources and irrigation. He served as the member of Pratinidhi Sabha elected from Saptari 3 of Madhesh province. He was defeated as Mayoral candidate in 2017 local elections of Nepal.
