= Amarkant Chaudhary =

Nepalese politician

Honourable Amarkant Chaudhary

Member of Parliament, Pratinidhi Sabha
- Preceded by: Dinesh Kumar Yadav
- Constituency: Saptari 3

Personal details
- Born: 16 November 1981 (age 44) Dakneshwori, Saptari District, Madhesh Province
- Party: Rastriya Swatantra Party
- Parent: Chandra Kanta Chaudhary (father)
- Occupation: Politician; Medical graduate

Amarkant Chaudhary is a Nepalese politician, Pratinidhi Sabha member and medical graduate. He entered into politics in 2017, taking a general membership of then Rastriya Janata Party Nepal and later contested for the mayoral election of Dakneshwari Municipality from the Loktantrik Samajwadi Party in 2022. He lost the local election to Ram Lakhan Malaha of CPN (UML), and ranked fourth with 1,818 votes.

He joined the Rastriya Swatantra Party in 2026 after the demise of his father Chandra Kanta Chaudhary and secured a party ticket to contest from Saptari 3 in 2026 general election.

In the 2026 general election, he won from Saptari 3 with 32,875 votes, defeating Upendra Yadav, Chairman of People's Socialist Party, Nepal, and Dinesh Kumar Yadav, seating MP and former district president of Nepali Congress, Saptari.

== Early life ==
Chaudhary was born in Dakneshwori, Saptari district, on 16 November 1981, to a Tharu family. He is a medical graduate.

== Electoral performance ==
Election	Year	Constituency/local unit	Contested for	Political party	Result	Votes	% of votes
Nepal local election	2017	Dakneshwori	Mayor	Loktantrik Samajwadi Party	Lost	1,818	8.77%
Nepal general election	2026	Saptari 3	Pratinidhi Sabha member	Rastriya Swatantra Party	Won	32,875	47.44%
