= Basbalpur =

Former Village Development Committee in Nepal

Basbalpur बसवलपुर
- Location in Nepal
- Coordinates: 26.60°N 86.67°E
- Country: Nepal
- Zone: Sagarmatha Zone
- District: Saptari District

Population (1991)
  - Total: 2,658
- Time zone: UTC+5:45 (Nepal Time)

Basbalpur is a market center and town in Sambhunath Municipality in Saptari District in the Sagarmatha Zone of south-eastern Nepal. The formerly VDC was merged along with Khoksar Parbaha, Sambhunath, Mohanpur, Bhangha and Rampur Jamuwa village development committee new municipality was formed on 18 May 2014. At the time of the 1991 Nepal census it had a population of 2658 people living in 446 individual households.
