= Mohanpur, Saptari =

Former Village Development Committee in Nepal

Mohanpur मोहनपुर
- Municipality
- Location in Nepal
- Coordinates: 26.63°N 86.67°E
- Country: Nepal
- Zone: Sagarmatha Zone
- District: Saptari District

Population (2011)
  - Total: 5,673
- Time zone: UTC+5:45 (Nepal Time)
- Area code: 031

Mohanpur is a developing village in Shambhunath Municipality in Saptari District in the Sagarmatha Zone of south-eastern Nepal. The formerly VDC was merged along with Khoksar Parbaha, Shambhunath, Mohanpur, Bhangha, Basbalpur and Rampur Jamuwa village development committee new municipality was formed on 18 May 2014. At the time of the 2011 Nepal census it had a population of 5673 people living in 1138 individual households.
