= Hariraha =

Place in Nepal

Hariraha हरिराहा
- Dakneshwori Municipality
- Location in Nepal
- Coordinates: 26.5299096°N 86.6139262°E
- Country: Nepal
- Zone: Sagarmatha Zone
- District: Saptari District

Government

Population (2011)
  - Total: 2,028
- Time zone: UTC+5:45 (Nepal Time)

Hariraha is ward in Dakneshwori Municipality in Saptari District in the Sagarmatha Zone of south-eastern Nepal. At the time of the 2011 Nepal census it had a population of 2,028.
