= Mohammad Samim =

Nepalese politician

Honourable Mohammad Samim
- मोहम्मद समिम

Minister for Home Affairs, Communication and Law
- Incumbent
- Assumed office 31 July 2023
- Governor: Hari Shankar Mishra

Province Assembly Member of Madhesh Province
- Incumbent
- Assumed office 2017
- Constituency: Saptari 3 (constituency)

Personal details
- Born: August 21, 1979 (age 46)
- Party: Nepali Congress
- Occupation: Politician

Mohammad Samim (Nepali: मोहम्मद समिम) is a Nepalese politician and Minister for Home Affairs, Communication and Law of Madhesh Province. Samim is a member of Provincial Assembly of Madhesh Province from Nepali Congress. Samim, a resident of Rupani Rural Municipality, was elected via 2017 Nepalese provincial elections from Saptari 3(A).

== Electoral history ==
=== 2017 Nepalese provincial elections ===
Party	Candidate	Votes
Nepali Congress	Mohammad Samim	11,628
Federal Socialist Forum, Nepal	Dinesh Kumar Yadav	9,979
CPN (Unified Marxist–Leninist)	Mahendra Prasad Chaudhary	4,602
Others		1,872
Invalid votes		2,397
Result	Congress gain	
Source: Election Commission
