= Aurahi, Saptari =

Dakneshwori Municipality in Sagarmatha Zone, Nepal

Aurahi औरही
- Dakneshwori Municipality
- Location in Nepal
- Coordinates: 26.50°N 86.63°E
- Country: Nepal
- Zone: Sagarmatha Zone
- District: Saptari District

Population (2011)
  - Total: 5,300
- Time zone: UTC+5:45 (Nepal Time)

Aurahi is ward in Dakneshwori Municipality in Saptari District in the Sagarmatha Zone of south-eastern Nepal. At the time of the 2011 Nepal census it had a population of 5300 people living in 1153 individual households.
