= Dakneshwori Municipality =

Dakneshwori डाक्नेश्वरी (Nepali)
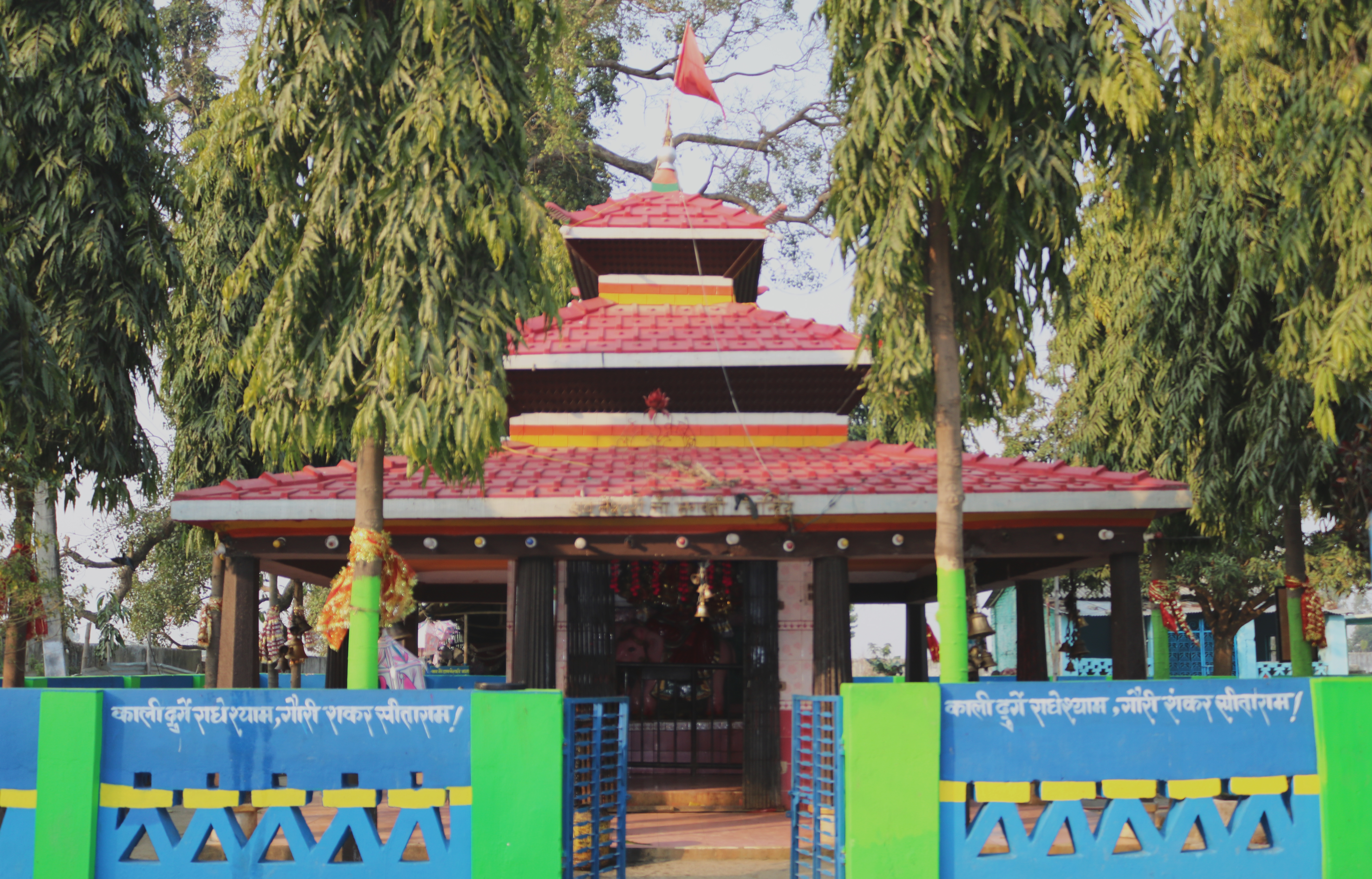
- Municipality
- Municipality in Nepal
- Motto: "समृद्ध डाक्नेश्वरी नगरपालिका हामी सबैको चाहना"
- Location in Nepal
- Coordinates: 26.50°N 86.62°E
- Country: Nepal
- Development Region: Eastern Development Region
- Zone: Sagarmatha
- District: Saptari
- Province: Madhesh
- Municipality: Dakneshwori
- No. of Wards: 10
- Named for: Dakneshwori Temple

Government
  - Mayor: Ram Lakhan Malah (CPN (UML))
  - Deputy Mayor: Mira Kumari Yadav(CPN (UML)

Area
  - Total: 69.11 km^{2} (26.68 sq mi)

Population (2017)
  - Total: 44,782
  - Density: 648.0/km^{2} (1,678/sq mi)
  - Religions: Hindu Muslim Christian

Languages
  - Local: Maithili, Tharu, Nepali
- Time zone: UTC+5:45 (NST)
- Postal Code: 56412
- Area code: 031
- Website: http://dakneshworimun.gov.np

Dakneshwori Municipality (Nepali: डाक्नेश्वरी नगरपालिका) is located in Saptari District in Madhesh Province of Nepal. It was formed in 2016 occupying current 10 sections (wards) merging previous Kabilasha, Hariraha, Tarhi, Bhuthi, Pato, Aurahi, Brahampur, Gamahariya Parwaha, Patthargada and Banaula VDCs. It occupies an area of 69.11 km^{2} with a total population of 44,782. Dakneshwori Municipality is named after the famous temple Dakneshwori Bhagwati located at ward no. 5, Pato.

== Geography ==
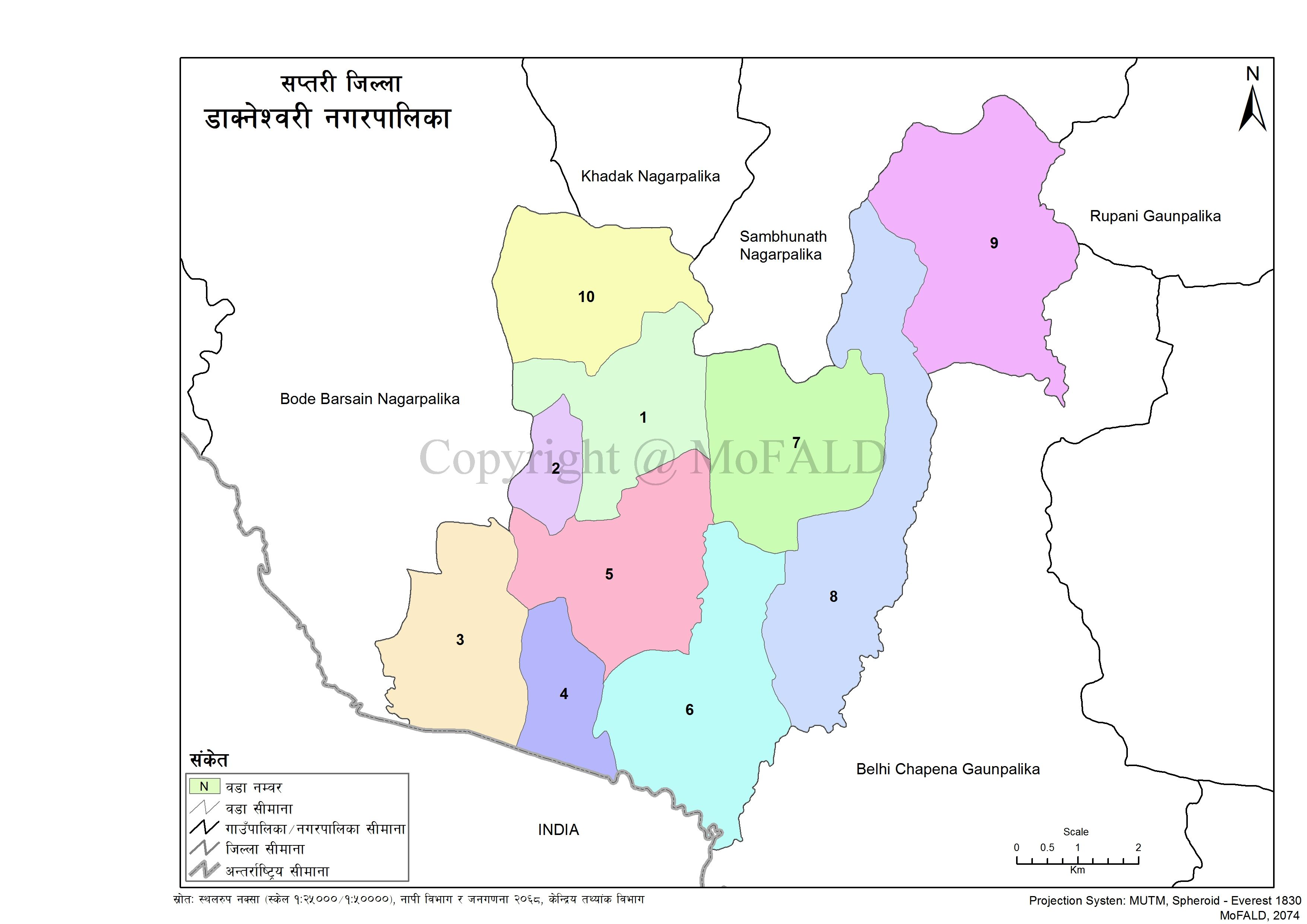

Dakneshwori is one of 9th municipality in Saptari District. The municipality is fully Terai that links Nepal with local Indian Market to its South, Bode Barshain Municipality to its west, Belhi Chapena Rural Municipality to its East and Khadak Municipality, Sambhunath Municipality and Rupani Rural Municipality to its North.

The major rivers like Judi, Khadak, Thalaha and Koshi Projects canals passing through the different wards have been the main sources of irrigation water supplies along with creating the boundaries with the neighboring wards and municipalities.

== Economy ==
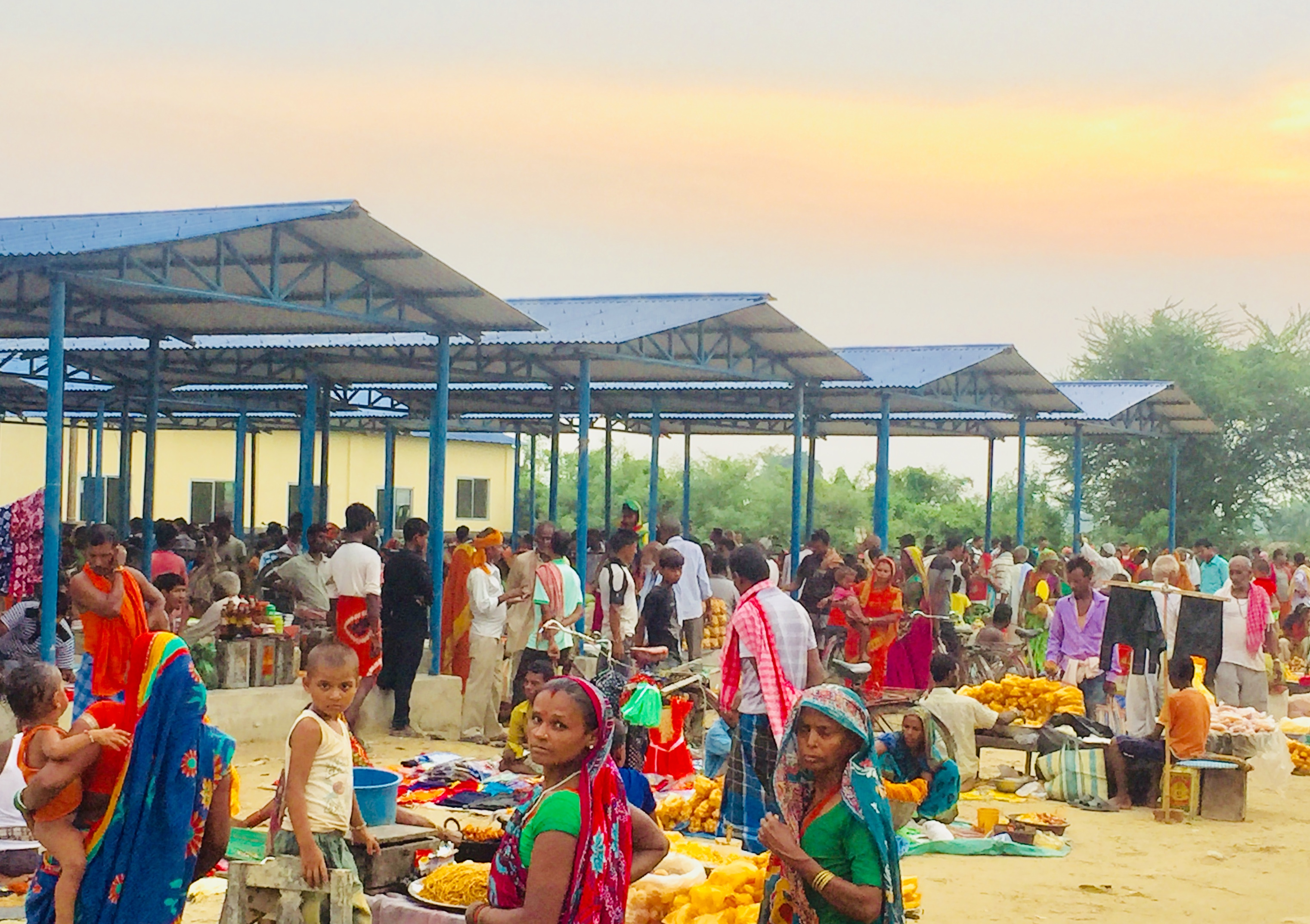
People gathering for buying and selling at Pato Hatya

This place is an agricultural area, however the Indian border being close, some people are engaged on commercial and trading too. The economy of Dakneshwori Municipality center around the trade, service and business. Some depends upon seasonal fruits like Mango. The main aspect of business in Dakneshwori involve bank, Education, transport, and small hotels. Being new municipality only few of bank, Financial institute and co-operative societies operate from here. Depend upon the agriculture and agricultural products sold in the nearest town Rajbiraj about 17 km (11 mi) and Kalyanpur. However, most people get their basic ready-made goods from India. These traditional markets called hatbajars are small bazaars and people can sell goods (especially vegetables, fruit, pulses, Fish, meat, earthenware, clothes etc.) two days of per week. There are small hatbajars within the municipality.

These hatbajars are :

- Pato Hatiya at Pato
- Patthargada Hatiya at Patthargada
- Brahampur Hatiya at Brahampur
- Tarhi Hatiya at Tarhi
- Banaula Hatiya at Banaula
- Amarlati Hatiya at Amarlati Chowk

== Transportation ==
Dakneshwori Municipality is connected from North to South by Kathauna - Pato Road. It connects to India.

== Climate ==
Dakneshwori Municipality has particularly a tropical climate. The three main seasons, summer, monsoon and winter respectively. Being located in the Plain (Terai) lands of Nepal, the climate and weather around the municipality is usually hot. Early April to August the environment copes summer season ranging the temperature from 23 °C (73 °F) to 44 °C (111 °F). Monsoons arrive in the month of July heralded by dust and thunderstorms. The winter part of the year prevails from the month of October to March. Humidity, which prevails during monsoons, diminishes at the arrival of winters. The village observes pleasant sunny days and enjoyable cool nights with the temperature ranging from 6 °C (41 °F) to 30 °C (86 °F).

Dakneshwori winter season is the most pleasant time. Overall the January is the coldest month and June is the most hottest month in the year.

Climate data for Kant Chand Higher Secondary School (2019)
Month	Jan	Feb	Mar	Apr	May	Jun	Jul	Aug	Sep	Oct	Nov	Dec	Year
Mean daily maximum °C (°F)	21.5 (70.7)	25.4 (77.7)	29.9 (85.8)	33.1 (91.6)	33.7 (92.7)	31.8 (89.2)	31.7 (89.1)	31.4 (88.5)	31.0 (87.8)	30.2 (86.4)	26.2 (79.2)	24.1 (75.4)	29.2 (84.5)
Mean daily minimum °C (°F)	8.0 (46.4)	10.1 (50.2)	12.6 (54.7)	18.4 (65.1)	22.3 (72.1)	24.2 (75.6)	24.6 (76.3)	24.4 (75.9)	23.6 (74.5)	20.8 (69.4)	12.4 (54.3)	9.2 (48.6)	17.6 (63.6)
Average precipitation mm (inches)	12.7 (0.50)	14.2 (0.56)	17.2 (0.68)	56.1 (2.21)	189.0 (7.44)	320.4 (12.61)	545.8 (21.49)	384.3 (15.13)	299.8 (11.80)	92.8 (3.65)	6.8 (0.27)	5.4 (0.21)	1,944.5 (76.55)
Source: Department of Hydrology and Meteorology (Nepal)

== Festivals and celebrations ==
Majority of the people in this locality is Hindu, they follows festivals like Vijaya Dashami, Dipawali, Chhath, Holi, Ram Navmi, Janai Purnima or Rakshabandhan, Saraswati Puja or Vasant Panchami, Jeetiya, Chauthi Chan, Vishwakarma Puja, Govardhan Puja, Bhai Tika, Chaite Dashain and so on. Some Muslims here too follows Bakra Eid. The Dashain, Deepawali, Chhath and Holi are heavily celebrated with full devotee and proper rules. The locals people take pride in the way these festivals are celebrated with joy and happiness.

=== Religious places ===
- Dakneshwori Temple at Pato
- Bishnu Temple at Banaula
- Kabileshwor Mahadev at Kabilasha
- Ram Janki Temple at Bhuthi
- Hanuman Temple at Kushaha
- Radha Krishna Temple, Patthargada
- Hanuman temple, Banaula 10

== Health ==
The health post located in different 9 wards provide regular vaccination program and monthly vaccination programs along with the maternity services throughout the municipality with the help of Women volunteer. It provides medicines to the poor people. It also provides birth control device like condoms and pills at zero cost. In severe case, the patients are referred to Gajendra Narayan Singh Sagarmatha Zonal Hospital (a zonal hospital) located in Rajbiraj and hospitals at Biratnagar and Dharan.

== Education ==
Dakneshwori Municipality occupies 14 Primary, 1 Lower-secondary, 7 secondary and 2 high schools. There are 25 schools including a special Muslim-oriented school all around 10 wards.

=== School ===
- Shree Sakhuwa Lachhanpatti Pokhariya Higher Secondary School, Patthargada
- Janta Rameshwor Higher Secondary School, Brahampur
- Kant Chand Higher Secondary School, Pato
- Shree Janta Higher Secondary School, Tarhi
- Shree Higher Secondary School, Kabilash
- Shree Janta Higher Secondary School, Kataiya Phattepur
- Shree Janata Secondary School, Hariraha, Basantpur

== See also ==
- Pato
- Saptari
- Dakneshwori Temple
