= Bhuthi =

Bhuthi भुतही
- Dakneshwori Municipality
- Location in Nepal
- Coordinates: 26.51°N 86.56°E
- Country: Nepal
- Province: Province No. 2
- District: Saptari District

Government

Population (2011)
  - Total: 4,016
- Time zone: UTC+5:45 (Nepal Time)

Bhuthi is ward in Dakneshwori Municipality in Saptari District in the Sagarmatha Zone of south-eastern Nepal. At the time of the 2011 Nepal census it had a population of 4,016.
