= Tarhi =

Tarhi तरही
- Dakneshwori Municipality
- Location in Nepal
- Coordinates: 26.5082435°N 86.5679364°E
- Country: Nepal
- Zone: Sagarmatha Zone
- District: Saptari District

Population (2011)
  - Total: 4,704
- Time zone: UTC+5:45 (Nepal Time)

Tarhi is ward in Dakneshwori Municipality in Saptari District in the Sagarmatha Zone of south-eastern Nepal. At the time of the 2011 Nepal census it had a population of 4,704.
