= Bidheshwor Prasad Yadav =

Nepalese politician

- बिदेश्वर प्रसाद यादव
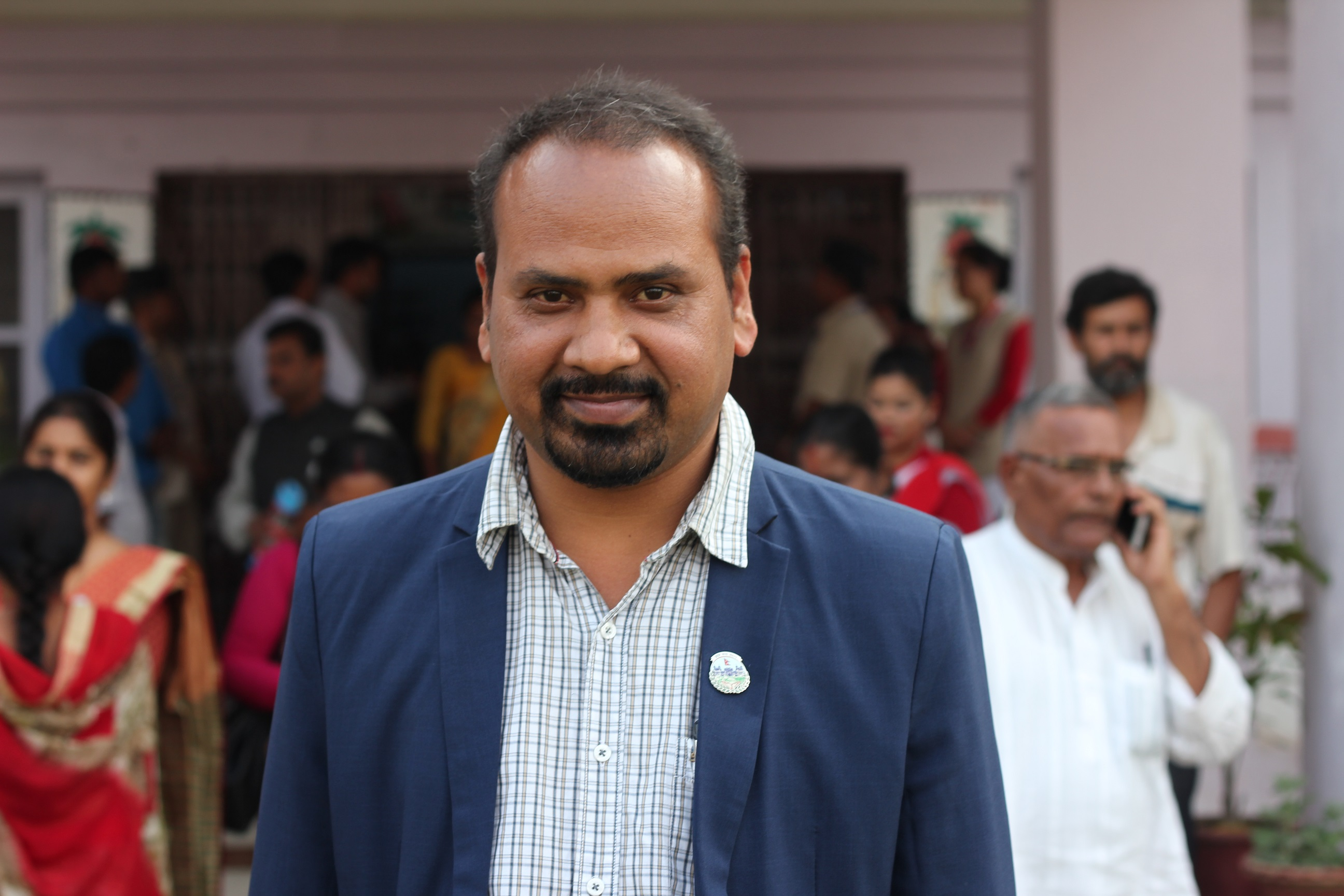
- Portrait of Yadav in 2019

Province Assembly Member of Madhesh Province
- In office 2017–2022
- Constituency: Proportional list

Personal details
- Party: People's Socialist Party, Nepal
- Occupation: Politician

Bidheshwor Prasad Yadav (Nepali: बिदेश्वर प्रसाद यादव) is a Nepalese politician who is former member of Provincial Assembly of Madhesh Province from People's Socialist Party, Nepal. Yadav, a resident of Dakneshwori Municipality, Saptari was elected to the 2017 provincial assembly election from Saptari 3(B).

== Electoral history ==
=== 2017 Nepalese provincial elections ===
Party	Candidate	Votes
Rastriya Janata Party Nepal	Bidheshwor Prasad Yadav	10,328
Nepali Congress	Bhagwati Prasad Yadav	6,212
CPN (Unified Marxist–Leninist)	Abdul Majid Sakir	5,573
Independent	Surendra Prasad Yadav	2,772
Naya Shakti Party, Nepal	Dambar Narayan Sah Teli	1,094
Others		1,448
Invalid votes		1,963
Result	RJPN gain	
Source: Election Commission
