= Shambhunath Temple =

Hindu temple in Nepal

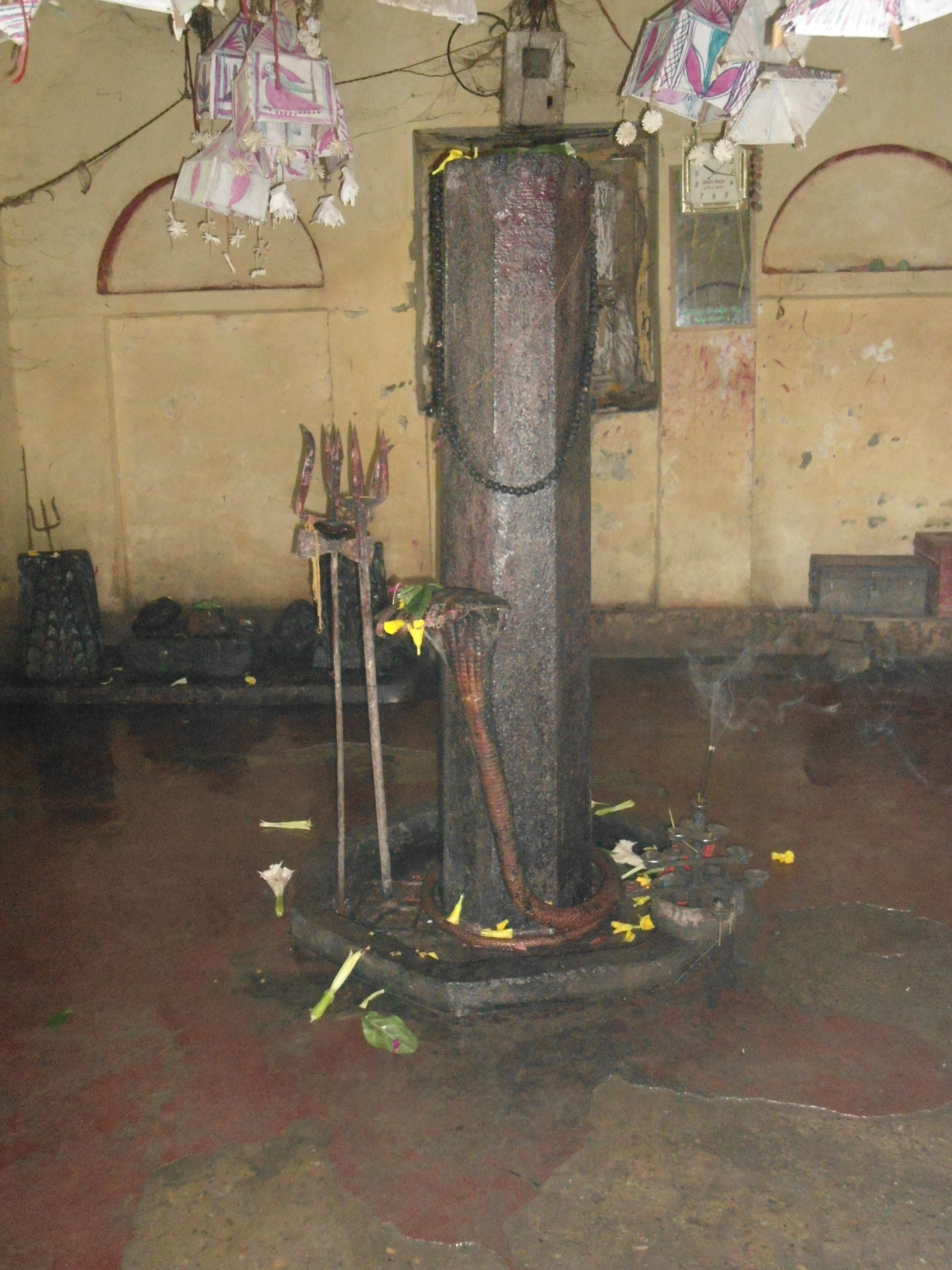
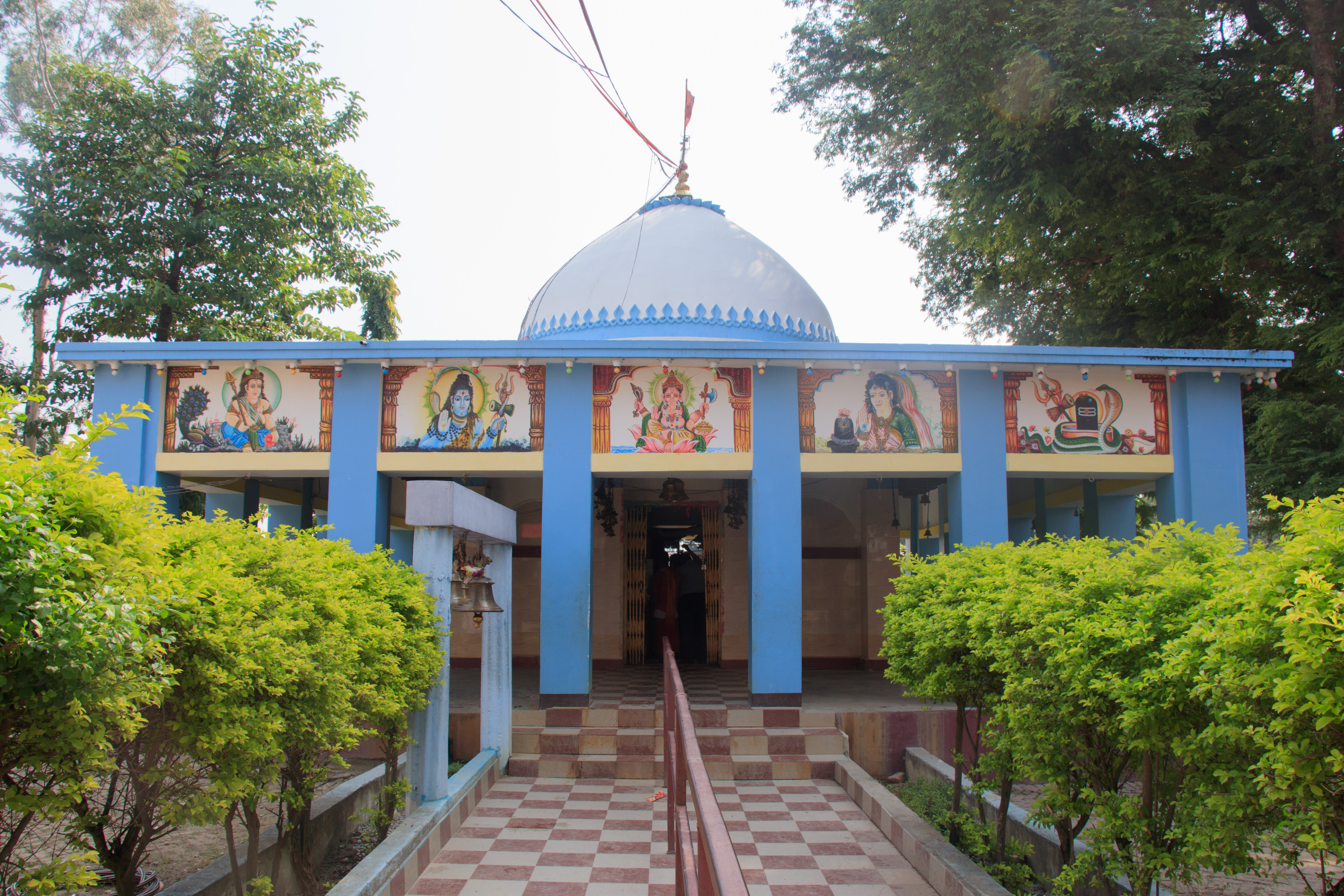
- The Shivalinga of Shambhunath Shambhunath temple

Religion
- Affiliation: Hinduism
- District: Saptari
- Deity: Shiva
- Festivals: Baishakh Purnima and Bada Dashain

Location
- Location: Shambhunath
- State: Madhesh Province
- Country: Nepal
- Interactive map of Shambhunath Temple
- Coordinates: 26.628691°N 86.685865°E

Architecture
- Type: Dome
- Completed: 1996

Specifications
- Temple: 1
- Elevation: 78 m (256 ft)

Shambhunath Temple (Nepali: शम्भुनाथ मन्दिर) is a Hindu temple in Shambhunath, Saptari, Nepal. The primary deity is Shiva. It is 500 m (0.31 mi) south of the Mahendra Highway section of Shambhunath, Saptari, and draws Nepal and Indian pilgrims, especially in the first month of the Nepali Calendar, Baishakh when a month-long mela is observed.

== History ==
The temple of Shambhunath was built around the 16th century during the Sena era. The Shivalinga, which was installed in Garbhagriha, was brought from Chandrabhoga Gadhi. The shape of the Shivalinga was octagonal and it's height is 5.5 ft (1.7 m). Along with the temple stairs, there are fragmentary stone artworks, temple pillars, roofs, arches, and remnants of idols of gods and goddesses.

Locals brought the Shivalinga of the temple from the Khando river, which was washed away from Chandrabhaga Gadhi. The various stone artifacts placed outside the temple were carried out from Chandrabhaga and Kanchhakhoriya Gadhi.

== Temple structure ==
The present temple was built in the dome style. The initial construction of the temple started in 1990 by a resident of Kachandaha, Buchaman Goit. Later, another local, Dasan Sah, took responsibility and completed the construction of this temple. There is an ancient pond outside the temple courtyard.

== Pilgrimage ==
Every year, thousands of pilgrims from Nepal, India, and other countries visit Shambhunath Temple to worship the Shivalinga. During the festivals of Baishakh Purnima and Dashain, more worshipers come here to visit the temple.
