= Rampur Jamuwa =

Place in Sagarmatha Zone, Nepal

Coordinates: 26°36′N 86°39′E

Rampur Jamuwa रामपुर जमुवा
- Interactive map of Rampur Jamuwa
- Country: Nepal
- Zone: Sagarmatha Zone
- District: Saptari District

Population (1991)
  - Total: 3,158
- Time zone: UTC+5:45 (Nepal Time)

Rampur Jamuwa is a market center and town in Sambhunath Municipality in Saptari District in the Sagarmatha Zone of south-eastern Nepal. The formerly VDC was merged along with Khoksar Parbaha, Sambhunath, Mohanpur, Bhangha and Basbalpur village development committee new municipality was formed on 18 May 2014. At the time of the 1991 Nepal census it had a population of 3158 people living in 559 individual households.
