= Umesh Kumar Yadav =

Nepali politician

Honourable Umesh Kumar Yadav

Irrigarion Minister
- In office 12 October 2015 – 4 August 2016
- President: Ram Baran Yadav; Bidhya Devi Bhandari
- Prime Minister: K. P. Sharma Oli
- Preceded by: Top Bahadur Rayamajhi
- Succeeded by: Deepak Giri

Member of Constituent Assembly
- In office 21 January 2014 – 14 October 2017
- Preceded by: Mahesh Prasad Yadav
- Succeeded by: Chandra Kanta Chaudhary
- Constituency: Saptari 3

Personal details
- Born: 13 March 1972 (age 54) Bhardaha, Saptari district, Nepal
- Party: PSP, Nepal (2026-present)
- Other political affiliations: UCPN (Maoist) (2009-2016); CPN (Maoist Center)(2016-2018; 2021-2025); Nepal Communist Party (2018-2021); Nepali Communist Party (2025)
- Spouse: Sulekha Yadav (m. 1998)
- Parent(s): Kishundev Yadav (father); Laxmi Devi Yadav (mother)
- Education: Tribhuvan University
- Residence: Chhinnamasta Rural Municipality, Saptari

Umesh Kumar Yadav is a Nepalese politician and former irrigation minister in First Oli cabinet. He was a member of 2nd Nepalese Constituent Assembly winning from Saptari 3 in 2013 Nepalese Constituent Assembly election. He joined PSP, Nepal in 2026 to contest in 2026 Nepalese general election from Saptari 2.

== Early life ==
Yadav was born to Kishundev Yadav and Laxmi Devi Yadav in Bhardaha, Saptari. He completed his Bachelor of Arts degree from Tribhuvan University.

== Electoral performance ==
Election	Year	Constituency	Contested for	Political party	Result	Votes	% of votes
Constituent Assembly election	2008	Saptari 3	Constituent Assembly member	CPN (Maoist)	Lost	5,513	11.85%
Constituent Assembly election	2013	Saptari 3	Constituent Assembly member	UCPN (Maoist)	Won	8,746	24.53%
Nepal general election	2017	Saptari 2	Pratinidhi Sabha member	CPN (Maoist Centre)	Lost	11,580	24.48%
Nepal provincial election	2022	Saptari 2 (A)	Provincial Assembly member	CPN (Maoist Centre)	Lost	7,023	25.02%
Nepal general election	2026	Saptari 2	Pratinidhi Sabha member	People's Socialist Party, Nepal	Lost	14,263	22.72%
