= Brahampur, Nepal =

Former Village Development Committee in Nepal

Brahampur ब्रह्मपुर
- Dakneshwori Municipality
- Location in Nepal
- Coordinates: 26.54°N 86.65°E
- Country: Nepal
- Zone: Sagarmatha Zone
- District: Saptari District

Population (2011)
  - Total: 4,673
- Time zone: UTC+5:45 (Nepal Time)

Brahampur is a ward in Dakneshwori Municipality in Saptari District in the Sagarmatha Zone of south-eastern Nepal. At the time of the 2011 Nepal census it had a population of 4,673.
