= Kabilasha =

Former Village Development Committee in Nepal

Kabilasha कविलासा
- Dakneshwori Municipality
- Interactive map of Kabilasha
- Coordinates: 26.32°N 86.37°E
- Country: Nepal
- Zone: Sagarmatha Zone
- District: Saptari District

Population (2011)
  - Total: 3,936
- Time zone: UTC+5:45 (Nepal Time)

Kabilasha is a ward in Dakneshwori Municipality in Saptari District in the Sagarmatha Zone of south-eastern Nepal. At the time of the 2011 Nepal census it had a population of 3,936 people living in 742 individual households.
