= Gamhariya Parwaha =

Former Village Development Committee in Nepal

Gamhariya Parwaha गमहरिया परवाहा
- Village development committee
- Location in Nepal
- Coordinates: 26.5323685°N 86.6166823°E
- Country: Nepal
- Zone: Sagarmatha Zone
- District: Saptari District

Population (2011)
  - Total: 6,145
- Time zone: UTC+5:45 (Nepal Time)

Gamhariya Parwaha is ward in Dakneshwori Municipality in Saptari District in the Sagarmatha Zone of south-eastern Nepal. At the time of the 2011 Nepal census it had a population of 6,145 people living in 1,070 individual households.

== Sources ==
1. https://web.archive.org/web/20181005234846/http://cbs.gov.np/image/data/Population/VDC-Municipality. Government of Nepal. National Planning Commission. November 2012.
2. https://election.ekantipur.com/pradesh-2/district-saptari?lng=eng. Kantipur Newspaper
3. https://thehimalayantimes.com/tag/saptari-election-results/.
4. https://web.archive.org/web/20180831065451/http://103.69.124.141/
