= Khoksar Parbaha =

Khoksar Parbaha खोकसर प्रवाहा
- Village development committee
- Interactive map of Khoksar Parbaha
- Coordinates: 26.39°N 86.44°E
- Country: Nepal
- Zone: Sagarmatha Zone
- District: Saptari District

Population (1991)
  - Total: 2,964
- Time zone: UTC+5:45 (Nepal Time)

Khoksar Parbaha is a market center and town in Shambhunath Municipality in Saptari District in the Sagarmatha Zone of south-eastern Nepal. The Khoksar Parbaha village development committee (VDC) was merged with Shambhunath, Mohanpur, Bhangaha, Basbalpur and Rampur Jamuwa VDCs to form a new municipality on 18 May 2014. At the time of the 1991 Nepal census, Khoksar Parbaha had a population of 2,964 people and 534 individual households. Khoksar Parbaha is bordered by Shambhunath and Rupani
