= Dakneshwori Temple =

Hindu temple in Nepal

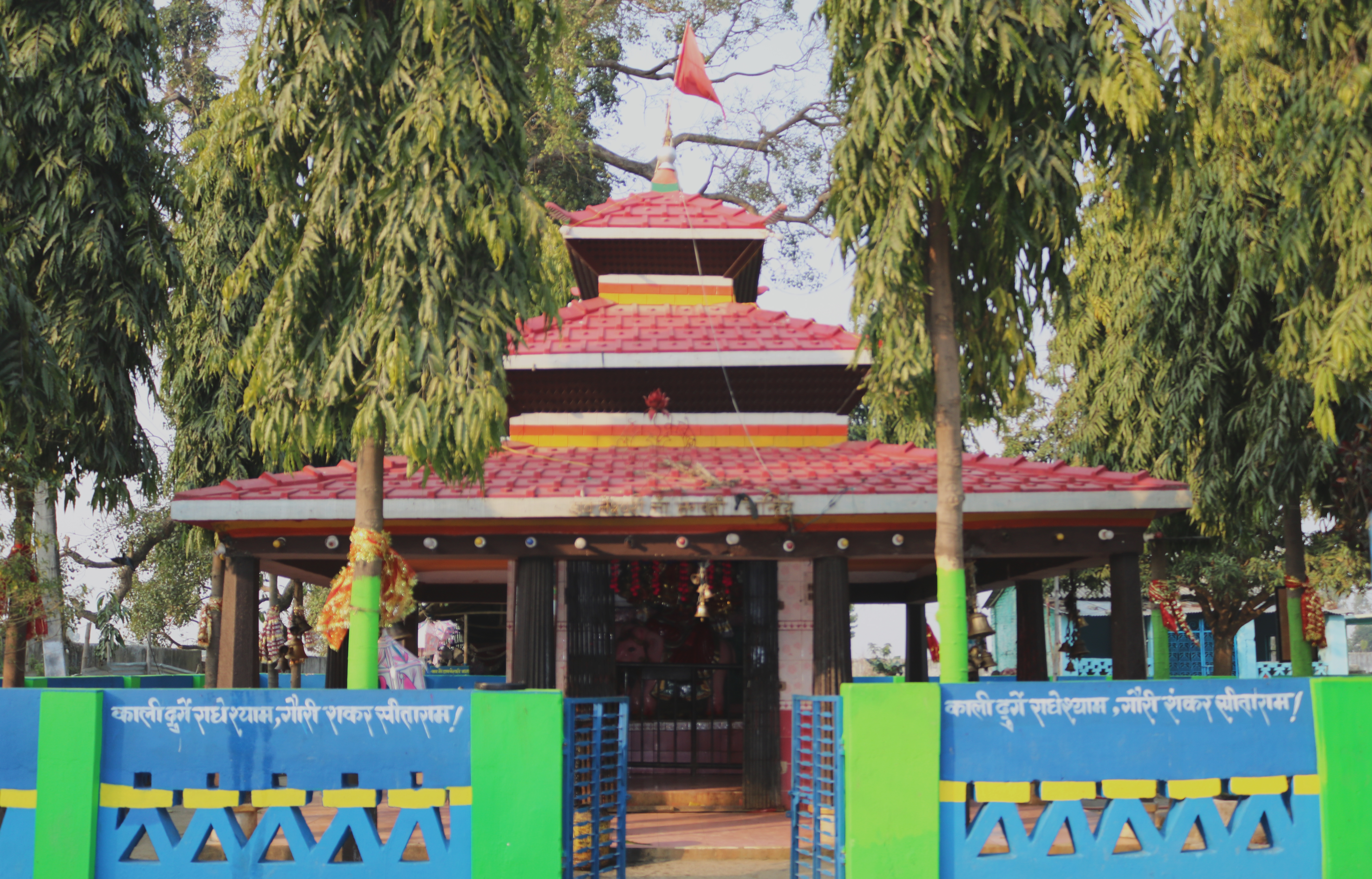
- Dakneshwori Temple

- Dakneshwori Temple in Nepal

Religion
- Affiliation: Hinduism
- District: Saptari
- Deity: Dakneshwori Bhagawati
- Festival: Bada Dashain

Location
- Location: Pato
- State: Madhesh Province
- Country: Nepal
- Coordinates: 26.51°N 86.62°E

Architecture
- Type: Pagoda Style

Specifications
- Temple: 5
- Inscriptions: Written in Stone
- Elevation: 76 m (249 ft)

Dakneshwori Temple (Nepali language: डाक्नेश्वरी मन्दिर) is a Hindu temple and Shakta pithas in South-Eastern Nepal. The primary deity is Dakneshwori. It is situated in the Pato Bazaar, Dakneshwori Municipality, Saptari. It draws Nepali and Indian pilgrims, especially in Bada Dashain, when thousands of goats are sacrificed there.

== History ==
The temple was reconstructed in the 1990s.

== Pilgrimage ==
Every year, thousands of pilgrims from Nepal, India and other countries visit Dakneshwori Temple, especially during the festivals of Dashain.

== See also ==
- Saptari
- Dakneshwori Municipality
