= List of monuments in Madhesh Province =

Province No. 2 (Nepali: प्रदेश नं. २) of Nepal is one of the seven provinces of Nepal established by the country's new constitution of 20 September 2015, comprising eight districts, namely, Bara, Dhanusha, Mahottari, Parsa, Rautahat, Saptari, Sarlahi, and Siraha. There are many categorized monuments sites in Province No. 2. Here is district wise List of Monuments which is in the Province no. 2.

== Lists per district of Province No. 2 ==
- List of monuments in Bara District
- List of monuments in Dhanusha District
- List of monuments in Mahottari District
- List of monuments in Parsa District
- List of monuments in Rautahat District
- List of monuments in Saptari District
- List of monuments in Sarlahi District
- List of monuments in Siraha District
