= Agnisair Krishnasavaran Rural Municipality =

Agnisaira Krishnasavaran अग्निसाइर कृष्णासवरन
- Rural Municipality (Gaunpalika)
- Location in Nepal
- Coordinates: 26.63°N 86.73°E
- Country: Nepal
- Zone: Sagarmatha Zone
- District: Saptari District
- Established: 2073

Government
  - Chairperson: Dinanath Chaudhary दीनानाथ चौधरी
  - Vice-chairperson: Kalpana Chaudhary कल्पना चौधरी

Area
  - Total: 103.08 km^{2} (39.80 sq mi)

Population (2017)
  - Total: 27,129
  - Density: 263.18/km^{2} (681.64/sq mi)
- Time zone: UTC+5:45 (Nepal Time)
- Postal code: 56405
- Area code: 031
- Website: http://www.agnisairkrishnasawaranmun.gov.np/

Agnisaira Krishnasavaran is a rural municipality in Saptari District in the Sagarmatha Zone of south-eastern Nepal. At the time of the 2017 Nepal census it had a population of 27,129 people living in 2265 individual households.

It is 462 km east of Kathmandu and 18 km north of Rajbiraj.

== Festivals and celebrations ==
- Jur Sital
- Raksha Bandhan
- Jitiya
- Dasain
- Deepaawali
- Chhath
- Samaa Chakewa
- Maaghe Sankraanti
- Holi
- Seeruwaa
- Ramdan
- Eid
- Bakar-Eid

== Religious places ==
- Agnisaira
- Krishnasavaran
- Kajaraadah
- Gormuraain

== Rivers and bridges ==
- Mahuli River
- Gehari River
- Dumarjor River
- Amsot River
- Murkutawa Bridge
- Herna Bridge
- Dudhela Bridge
- Bihai

== Education ==
Ward No. 1: Public Schools

- Shree Thakur Ji Secondary School, Jandaul, Saptari
- Shree Janachetana Secondary School, Ghongidaha, Bhawanipur, Saptari

Private/Boarding School

- P. R. Memorial School, Ghongidaha, Bhawanipur, Saptari

Ward No. 2: Public Schools

- Shree Sa. De. Fu. Ja. Secondary School, Sitapur, Saptari
- Shree Rastriya Primary School, Sitapur, Saptari
- Shree Ja. Rastriya Primary School, Sitapur, Saptari

Private/Boarding School

- Crimson Boarding School, Chandani Chowk, Saptari
- Maa English Boarding School, Sitapur, Kalauni, Saptari

Ward No. 3: Public Schools

- Shree Janata Basic School, Matigadhi, Saptari
- Shree Janata Basic School, Hariharpur, Saptari

Private/Boarding School

- Surya English Boarding School, Matigadha, Saptari

Ward No. 4: Public Schools

- Shree Mahikar Secondary School, Prasbani, Saptari
- Shree Shyam Rastriya Primary School, Prasbani, Saptari
- Shree Rastriya Primary School, Belha, Saptari
- Shree Basic School, Banauli, Saptari
- Shree Ram Janaki Primary School, Tengry, Saptari

Ward No. 5: Public Schools

- Shree Basic School, Chhapki, Saptari
- Madarsa School, Chhapki, Saptari
- Shree Hirawati Basic School, Bakdhuwa, Saptari

Ward No. 6: Public Schools

- Shree Saamudaayik Primary School, Mohanpur, Saptari
- Shree Rastriya Secondary School, Ratwala, Saptari

Private/Boarding School

- The Everest Secondary English Boarding School, Mahuli, Saptari
- Shree Aadarsha Secondary School, Mahuli, Saptari
- Galaxy Boarding School, Mahuli, Saptari
- Merryland Applied Academy, Mahuli, Saptari

== Banks ==
- Machhapuchhre Bank Limited, Mahuli Bazaar, Saptari
- Kaamana Sewa Bikas Bank Limited, Mahuli Bazaar, Saptari

== Markets ==
Rural Market Centers

- Tapeshwori Hatbazar
- Itaharwa Sitapur Kaloni hHatbazar
- Jandoul Hatbazar
- Raghunathpur Hatbazar Chandani chowk
- Shree Ram Janaki Hatbazar
- Bargachhi Hatbaza
- RAKHADHATI krisi Hatbazar-HARIHARPUR
- Bishalchowk Hatbazar
- Prasbani Htbazar
- Banouli Hatbazar
- Mahuli Bazar
- Bhimraita Hatbazar
