= Anish Ansari =

Nepali politician

Honourable Anish Ansari

Minister of State Labour
- In office 8 January 1997 – 10 March 1997
- Monarch: Birendra
- Prime Minister: Sher Bahadur Deuba

Assistant Minister for Supplies
- In office 1995 – 17 December 1996
- Monarch: Birendra
- Prime Minister: Sher Bahadur Deuba
- Succeeded by: Duryodhan Chaudhary

Member of Parliament
- In office October 1994 – May 1999
- Preceded by: Hari Prasad Raya Amat
- Succeeded by: Renu Kumari Yadav
- Constituency: Saptari 3

Chairman of the Rajbiraj Town Panchayat
- In office 1982–1985
- Preceded by: Bhikham Chand Jain
- Succeeded by: Govinda Prasad Singh

Personal details
- Born: 24 January 1951 (age 75) Rajbiraj, Saptari district, Nepal
- Other political affiliations: Nepal Sadbhawana Party
- Parent: Samshul Haq Ansari (father)
- Residence: Rajbiraj, Saptari

Anish Ansari is a Nepalese politician, former chairman of Rajbiraj Town Panchayat, former state minister of labour, and an assistant minister for supplies in First Deuba cabinet. He was a member of 3rd House of Representatives, winning from Saptari 3 in 1994 Nepalese general election. He was the founder general secretary of Nepal Sadbhawana Party. He contested two general elections from the Nepal Sadhbhawana Party in 1991 and 1994, but later joined the Nepali Congress to contest the 1999 general election. He also manage to joined Terai Madhesh Loktantrik Party, CPN (Maoist Centre), and Janamat Party to contest in different elections. He joined Rastriya Mukti Party Nepal in 2026 to contest in 2026 Nepalese general election from Saptari 2.

== Early life ==
Ansari was born to Shamsul Haq Ansari in Rajbiraj, Saptari.

== Electoral performance ==
Election	Year	Constituency	Contested for	Political party	Result	Votes	% of votes
Nepal general election	1991	Saptari 3	Pratinidhi Sabha member	Nepal Sadbhawana Party	Lost	9,932	24.99%
Nepal general election	1994	Saptari 3	Pratinidhi Sabha member	Nepal Sadbhawana Party	Won	12,743	30.01%
Nepal general election	1999	Saptari 3	Pratinidhi Sabha member	Nepali Congress	Lost	10,803	20.86%
Constituent Assembly election	2008	Saptari 3	Constituent Assembly member	Terai Madhesh Loktantrik Party	Lost	6,921	14.87%
Constituent Assembly election	2013	Saptari 3	Constituent Assembly member	Sadbhavana Party	Lost	8,746	10.08%
Rajbiraj municipal election	2017	Rajbiraj	Mayor	CPN (Maoist Centre)	Lost	3,316	16.59%
Nepal provincial election	2022	Saptari 3	Pratinidhi Sabha member	Janamat Party	Lost	15,114	22.62%
Nepal general election	2026	Saptari 2	Pratinidhi Sabha member	Rastriya Mukti Party Nepal	Lost	210	0.33%
