= Patthargada =

Patthargada पत्थरगाढा
- Village development committee
- Location in Nepal
- Coordinates: 26.57°N 86.68°E
- Country: Nepal
- Zone: Sagarmatha Zone
- District: Saptari District

Population (1991)
  - Total: 3,992
- Time zone: UTC+5:45 (Nepal Time)

Patthargada is a village development committee in Saptari District in the Sagarmatha Zone of south-eastern Nepal. At the time of the 1991 Nepal census it had a population of 3992 people living in 755 individual households.
