= Harinandeshwar Mahadev Mandir =

Shiva temple in Rajbiraj, Saptari

- Devanagari: हरिनन्देश्वर महादेव मन्दिर
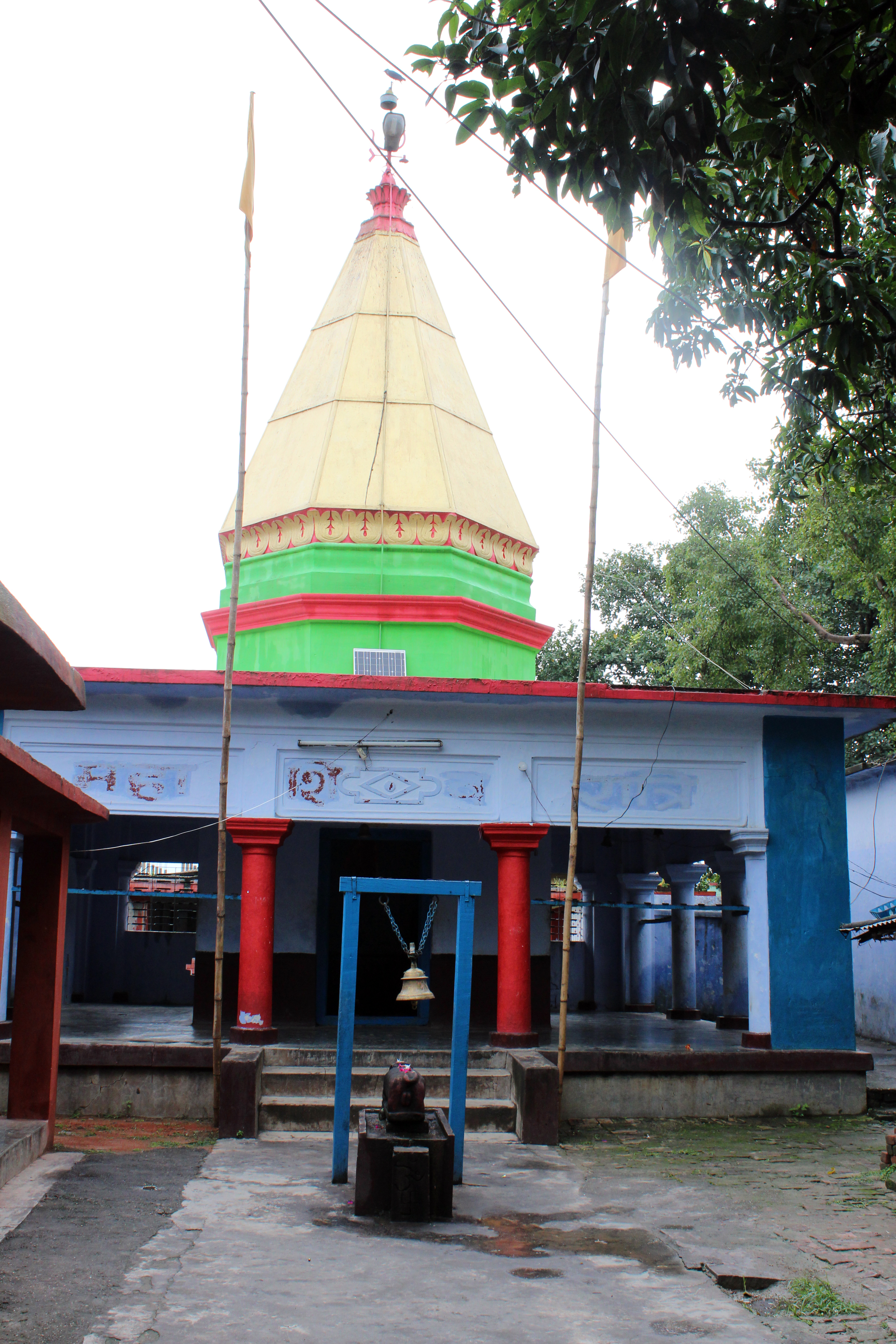

Religion
- Affiliation: Hinduism
- District: Saptari district
- Province: Madhesh Pradesh
- Deity: Lord Shiva
- Festival: Mahashivaratri

Location
- Location: Rajbiraj, Nepal
- Interactive map of Harinandeshwar Mahadev Mandir
- Coordinates: 26.540952°N 86.746853°E

Architecture
- Founder: Harinand Pokharel
- Established: B.S. 1840 (Note: The temple was established in Naraha, later the Shiva linga was moved to Hanumannagar and finally to Rajbiraj in CE 1956-57.)

Harinandeshwar Mahadev Mandir (Devanagari: हरिनन्देश्वर महादेव मन्दिर) is an ancient temple dedicated to Lord Shiva in the Mithila region of the Indian subcontinent. It is located in Rajbiraj, Saptari district of the Madhesh Province. It is the most ancient hindu temple in Rajbiraj. The Shiva linga was established by Harinand Pokharel at Naraha in B.S. 1840 (AD 1896-97). Later, it was shifted to Hanumannagar and then to Rajbiraj because of the Kosi river flood.

The number of devotees turned higher during festivals like Maha Shivaratri, Shraavana, Naga Panchami, Kartik Purnima.

== History ==
The temple is near the Bhagwati Temple complex in Rajbiraj. The Shivalinga's history was rooted in Naraha, a village on the bank of the Kosi River. The Kosi River flood forced the descendant priest, Uchit Bharati, to move the Shivalinga from Naraha to Hanumannagar Bazaar, then the administrative headquarters of Saptari district, around CE 1940-41. The priest kept the Shivalinga in a simple house in Mansapur village (now Tilathi Koiladi Rural Municipality) and worshipped there for about two years. Finally, he brought the Shivalinga to Rajbiraj around CE 1955-56.

In 1956, then king Mahendra visited Rajbiraj and offered his prayers to the Shivalinga, which was placed under a Peepal tree in front of the present-day District Sports Development Committee Saptari. A devotee from Bhabhangama Katti, named Babu Saheb, constructed the present temple at his own expense.

== Architecture ==
The temple is built in the Tirhut Shikhara architectural style, which is common in the Hindu temple of the Mithila region.

== Managing Committee ==
The Harinandeshwar Mahadev Mandir committee is the responsible body for managing and preserving the temple. The committee members include local activists and local body members.
