= 2017 Rajbiraj municipal election =

City elections in Rajbiraj, Nepal

2017 Rajbiraj municipal elections
- 18 September 2017

85 seats to Rajbiraj Municipal City Council 43 seats needed for a majority
- Turnout: 72.85%
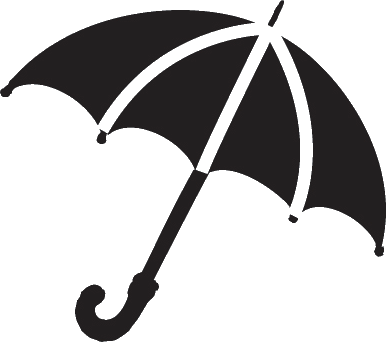

	First party	Second party	Third party
Party	RJPN	Forum Nepal	Maoist Centre
Seats won	29	23	12
Percentage	35.36%	28.04%	14.63%
Mayor before election
Jagarnath Das
Independent
Elected Mayor
Shambhu Prasad Yadav
RJPN

The 2017 Municipal election for Rajbiraj was held on 18 September 2017, to elect a mayor, a deputy mayor, sixteen ward chairperson and ward members. All positions were elected for a period of five years. A secondary election was held for the municipal executives which elected five women from the elected ward members and three members from the Dalit and minority community. The electorate for this election was for the 82 members chosen by direct election. Rastriya Janata Party Nepal mayoral candidate Shambhu Prasad Yadav was elected as a Mayor of Rajbiraj by securing 4,774 votes.

== Background ==
The last municipal elections were held in 53 municipalities on 8 February 2006 under regime of King Gyanendra but were boycotted by the major political parties and saw low voter turnout.Later, the 2006 municipal election was nullified and declared illegitimate by the political parties and other states.Therefore, the last local elections was held in 1997. Since then, the municipality has been without an elected executive. With the passing of a new constitution in 2015, a commission was formed to restructure the existing local levels into more powerful and autonomous local bodies. The city limits of Rajbiraj were changed during this restructuring and the number of wards was increased from 10 to 16. Electors in each ward will elect a ward chairperson and 4 ward members. Out of 4 ward members, 2 must be female and one of the 2 females must belong to the Dalit community.

== Voters ==
Election Commission of Nepal is the responsible body to update and publish the final electoral rolls before the election in Nepal. The election commission had published the final voter list for the local level election on 20 August, 2017. There is a total of 32,035 registered voters who can cast their vote in Rajbiraj municipal election. The electoral details for the 2017 Rajbiraj municipal election:

Men	Women	Third gender	Total
15028	17005	2	32035

== Election schedule ==
On 5 September 2017, the Election commission of Nepal announced the election schedule for the local election.

S.N.	Activities	Date
1	Candidate nomination registration	2017 September 06
2	Publication of nominated candidate list	2017 September 06
3	Complaining against a candidate	2017 September 07
4	Scrutiny of nomination	2017 September 07-08
5	Last Date for Withdrawal of nomination	2017 September 08
6	Publication of final candidate list	2017 September 08
7	Provide election symbols to candidates	2017 September 09
8	Election day	2017 September 18
Date of Counting of Votes		Immediately after completion of election
Source: Election Commission of Nepal

== Issues ==
- Urban Planning & Development
- Sanitation
- Women Safety

== Candidates ==
=== Mayor Candidates ===
==== Shambhu Prasad Yadav ====
Shambhu Prasad Yadav, a builder and politician is contesting for the Mayoral post in local level elections from Rastriya Janata Party Nepal.

==== Bhimraj Yadav ====
Bhimraj Yadav is one of the popular builder, social activist and politician from Rajbiraj, is the candidate from Federal Socialist Forum, Nepal

==== Anish Ansari ====
Anish Ansari, former state minister and mayor is the candidate from CPN-MC.

==== Sailesh Chaudhary ====
Sailesh Kumar Chaudhary is former mayor of Rajbiraj Municipality is the candidate from Nepal Loktantrik Forum.

== Voters turnout ==
The Election commission of Nepal has scheduled the polling time from early 7:00 am NST to 17:00 pm NST on 18 September 2017. There are total 27 polling stations and 46 voting booths in Rajbiraj municipal election.

== Results ==
=== Mayoral election ===
Mayoral elections result
Party	Candidate	Votes	%	±%
RJPN	Shambhu Prasad Yadav	4,774	23.88%	New
Forum Nepal	Bhimraj Yadav	4,759	23.81%	New
Maoist Centre	Anish Ansari	3,316	16.59%	New
Nepal Loktantrik Forum	Sailesh Kumar Chaudhary	2,507	12.54%	New
Congress	Dhruva Prasad Dev	2,110	10.56%	New
CPN (UML)	Sukhram Yadav	2,027	10.14%	New
Rastriya Prajatantra Party	Sailendra Kumar Sah	179	0.90%	New
NSP	Mina Thakur	151	0.76%	New
RPP	Amit Kumar Yadav	78	0.39%	New
Others		88	0.44%	
Total votes		19,989	100.0%	
RJPN hold				

=== Deputy-Mayoral election ===
Deputy mayoral elections result
Party	Candidate	Votes	%	±%
RJPN	Sadhana Jha	5,195	27.36%	New
Forum Nepal	Kiran Kumari Sah	4,269	22.48%	New
CPN (UML)	Mamta Kumari Chaudhary	2,912	15.34%	New
Maoist Centre	Sumitra Kumari Yadav	2,704	14.24%	New
Congress	Sushila Kumari Yadav	2,072	10.91%	New
Nepal Loktantrik Forum	Pabani Devi Khang	1,458	7.68%	New
NSP	Anant Lal Sah	157	0.83%	New
Rastriya Prajatantra Party	Laxmi Chaurasiya	135	0.71%	New
RPP	Mandira Pariyar	87	0.46%	New
Total votes		18,989	100.0%	
RJPN hold				

== Ward results ==
Summary of Partywise Ward chairman and Ward member seats won, 2017

Party	Chairman	Members
Rastriya Janata Party Nepal	5	22
Federal Socialist Forum, Nepal	4	19
CPN (MC)	4	8
Nepali Congress	1	9
CPN (UML)	0	3
Nepal Loktantrik Forum	0	3
Independent politician	2	0
Total	16	64

=== Ward wise elected chairman details ===
No.	Ward No.	Ward Chairman	Political Party
1.	Ward No. 1	Chandra Shekhar Chaudhary	Rastriya Janata Party Nepal
2.	Ward No. 2	Arun Kumar Yadav	Federal Socialist Forum, Nepal
3.	Ward No. 3	Sudarshan Prasad Singh	Independent politician
4.	Ward No. 4	Akhtar Ali Miya	CPN (Maoist Center)
5.	Ward No. 5	Samir Kumar Jha	Nepali Congress
6.	Ward No. 6	Prem Kumar Yadav	CPN (Maoist Center)
7.	Ward No. 7	Mangi Lal Nai	Independent politician
8.	Ward No. 8	Jay Narayan Mandal	CPN (Maoist Center)
9.	Ward No. 9	Shambhu Prasad Yadav	Rastriya Janata Party Nepal
10.	Ward No. 10	Sushil Kumar Das	Rastriya Janata Party Nepal
11.	Ward No. 11	Sanjay Kumar Yadav	CPN (Maoist Center)
12.	Ward No. 12	Harihar Yadav	Federal Socialist Forum, Nepal
13.	Ward No. 13	Rajendra Prasad Yadav	Federal Socialist Forum, Nepal
14.	Ward No. 14	Shobha Lal Mandal	Rastriya Janata Party Nepal
15.	Ward No. 15	Ram Prasad Yadav	Federal Socialist Forum, Nepal
16.	Ward No. 16	Buchai Das	Rastriya Janata Party Nepal

== See also ==
- 2017 Nepalese local elections
- 2017 Lalitpur municipal election
- 2017 Kathmandu municipal election
