= List of monuments in Dhanusha, Nepal =

This is a list of monuments in Dhanusha District, Nepal as officially recognized by and available through the website of the Department of Archaeology, Nepal. Dhanusha is a district of Province No. 2 and is located in southern Nepal. Hindu temples are the main attraction of this district.

== List of monuments ==
ID	Name	Type	Location	District	Coordinates	Image
NP-DHA-01	Ram Janaki Temple		Janakpur	Dhanusha	26°43′49″N 85°55′32″E	Ram Janaki Temple Upload Photo
NP-DHA-02	Bibah Mandap Temple			Dhanusha	26°43′49″N 85°55′25″E	Bibah Mandap Temple Upload Photo
NP-DHA-03	Dhanusha Temple			Dhanusha	26°52′14″N 86°02′44″E	Upload Photo Upload Photo
NP-DHA-04	Shivjee Temple			Dhanusha	26°43′46″N 85°55′38″E	Upload Photo Upload Photo
NP-DHA-05	Bibaah Mandap			Dhanusha	26°43′49″N 85°55′25″E	Upload Photo Upload Photo
NP-DHA-06	Ram Paduka		Janakpur	Dhanusha	26°43′49″N 85°55′25″E	Upload Photo Upload Photo
NP-DHA-07	Dhanush Saagar (1?)		Janakpur	Dhanusha		Dhanush Saagar (1?) Upload Photo
NP-DHA-08	Dhanush Saagar (2?)		Janakpur	Dhanusha	26°43′41″N 85°55′42″E	Upload Photo Upload Photo
NP-DHA-09	Udeshwarnath Temple		Janakpur	Dhanusha		Upload Photo Upload Photo
NP-DHA-10	Kupeshwar Satal		Janakpur	Dhanusha		Kupeshwar Satal Upload Photo
NP-DHA-11	Mithila Bihari Temple		Janakpur	Dhanusha		Upload Photo Upload Photo
NP-DHA-12	Laxmi Narayan Temple		Janakpur	Dhanusha	26°36′46″N 85°50′36″E	Upload Photo Upload Photo
NP-DHA-13	Hanumangadhi		Janakpur	Dhanusha		Upload Photo Upload Photo
NP-DHA-14	Dulhaduhlin		Ramanand chowk, Janakpur	Dhanusha		Upload Photo Upload Photo

== See also ==
- List of monuments in Province No. 2
- List of monuments in Nepal
