= Banaula =

Village development committee in Sagarmatha Zone, Nepal

Banaula बनौला
- Village development committee
- Location in Nepal
- Coordinates: 26.56°N 86.61°E
- Country: Nepal
- Zone: Sagarmatha Zone
- District: Saptari District

Population (2011)
  - Total: 3,388
- Time zone: UTC+5:45 (Nepal Time)

Banaula is a village development committee in Saptari District in the Sagarmatha Zone of south-eastern Nepal. At the time of the 2011 Nepal census it had a population of 3388 people living in 616 individual households.
