= Pato, Nepal =

Pato पातो
- Dakneshwori Municipality
- Location in Nepal
- Coordinates: 26.52°N 86.61°E
- Country: Nepal
- Zone: Sagarmatha Zone
- District: Saptari District

Population (1991)
  - Total: 3,520
- Time zone: UTC+5:45 (Nepal Time)

Pato is the headquarter of Dakneshwori Municipality in Saptari District in the Sagarmatha Zone of south-eastern Nepal. At the time of the 1991 Nepal census it had a population of 3520 people living in 705 individual households.
