= List of monuments in Bara, Nepal =

This is a list of monuments in Bara District, Nepal as officially recognized by and available through the website of the Department of Archaeology, Nepal. Bara is a district of Province No. 2 and is located in southern Nepal. Hindu temples are the main attraction of this district.

== List of monuments ==
ID	Name	Type	Location	District	Coordinates	Image
NP-BR-01	Ranibas Mat & Ramjhanki Temple			Bara		Ranibas Mat & Ramjhanki Temple Upload Photo
NP-BR-02	Kankali Temple			Bara		Kankali Temple Upload Photo
NP-BR-03	Ramjhanki Temple			Bara		Upload Photo Upload Photo
NP-BR-04	Barewa Palace			Bara		Upload Photo Upload Photo
NP-BR-05	Ramjanaki mut			Bara		Upload Photo Upload Photo
NP-BR-06	Simraungadh			Bara		Upload Photo Upload Photo
NP-BR-07	Bairia			Bara		Upload Photo Upload Photo
NP-BR-08	Baragadhi			Bara		Upload Photo Upload Photo
NP-BR-09	Gadhimai Temple		Bariyarpatti	Bara		Gadhimai Temple Upload Photo

== See also ==
- List of monuments in Province No. 2
- List of monuments in Nepal
