= List of monuments in Parsa, Nepal =

This is a list of monuments in Parsa District, Nepal as officially recognized by and available through the website of the Department of Archaeology, Nepal. Parsa is a district of Madhesh Pradesh and is located in southern Nepal. Hindu temples are the main attraction of this district.

== List of monuments ==
ID	Name	Type	Location	District	Coordinates	Image
NP-PA-01	Bindhyabasini mut			Parsa		Upload Photo Upload Photo
NP-PA-02	Mahuwanmat (Parsanath Mahadev Temple)			Parsa		Upload Photo Upload Photo
NP-PA-03	Ramjhanki Mat			Parsa		Upload Photo Upload Photo
NP-PA-04	Katti Math			Parsa		Upload Photo Upload Photo
NP-PA-05	Ramjhanki Mat			Parsa		Upload Photo Upload Photo
NP-PA-06	Radhakrishna Temple			Parsa		Upload Photo Upload Photo
NP-PA-07	Bhiswa Archaeological site			Parsa		Upload Photo Upload Photo
NP-PA-08	Parsagadhi			Parsa		Upload Photo Upload Photo
NP-PA-09	devi mai mandir		sakhuwa prasauni 6	Parsa		Upload Photo Upload Photo

== See also ==
- List of monuments in Province No. 2
- List of monuments in Nepal
