= Tilathi Koiladi Rural Municipality =

Tilathi Koiladi तिलाठी कोईलाडी
- Rural Municipality (Gaunpalika)
- Location in Madhesh Province Tilathi Koiladi (Nepal)
- Coordinates: 26.46°N 86.75°E
- Country: Nepal
- Zone: Sagarmatha Zone
- District: Saptari District
- Established: 2073

Government
  - Chairperson: Arun Kumar Mandal (NC)
  - Deputy chairperson: Phul Kumari Sah (NC)

Population (2017)
  - Total: 32,389
- Time zone: UTC+5:45 (Nepal Time)
- Postal code: 56400
- Area code: 031
- Website: https://www.tilathikoiladimun.gov.np/

Tilathi Koiladi is a rural municipality in Saptari District in the Sagarmatha Zone of south-eastern Nepal. At the time of the 2017 Nepal census it had a population of 32,389 people living in 9845 individual households.
