= Bhardaha =

Former Village Development Committee in Nepal

Bhardaha भारदह
- Local Town
- Location in Nepal
- Coordinates: 26.55°N 86.92°E
- Country: Nepal
- Province: Madhesh Province
- District: Saptari District
- Region: Mithila

Population (2011)
  - Total: 7,124
- Demonyms: Bhardaihiya, Bhardians

Languages
  - Official: Maithili, Nepali
  - Local: Maithili
- Time zone: UTC+5:45 (Nepal Time)
- Postal code: 56418
- Area code: 031

Bhardaha is a local town of Hanumannagar Kankalini Municipality in Saptari District of Madhesh Province in Nepal. At the time of the 2022 Nepal census it had a population of 14,564 people living in 7,239 individual households.

== Tourism ==
- Kankalini Temple - It is one of the famous Shakta pithas of Nepal. Millions of pilgrims come to worship and visit this temple yearly from Nepal and India.
- Koshi River and Koshi Barrage - Koshi is the largest river of Nepal and the barrage made over this river have 56 gates and this barrage is so much attractive. So many people come to visit and celebrate picnic and holidays on bank of this river.
- Banana Orchard - The banana of Bhardaha has become so famous in Nepal in few years of beginning of banana farming also in India near border side. The green view of banana orchard is so attractive.
- Koshi Tappu Wildlife Reserve. * Shiv mandir - It is one of the famous shivalay khoshi koloni bhardah . Shree shree 108shree bhadreshwarnatha shiv mandir ..

== Economy ==
The economy of Bhardians are basically depends on farming. Many people (above 60%) are involved in banana farming. Remaining population are involved in other types of farming and local business. The lifestyle of people of Bhardians are medium. Village is full of middle-class families.

== Notable people ==
- C. K. Raut – social activist, author and computer scientist
- Udit Narayan : Famous Bollywood and Nepali singer from Bhardaha, Saptari
