= Kankalini Temple =

Hindu temple in Madhesh, Nepal

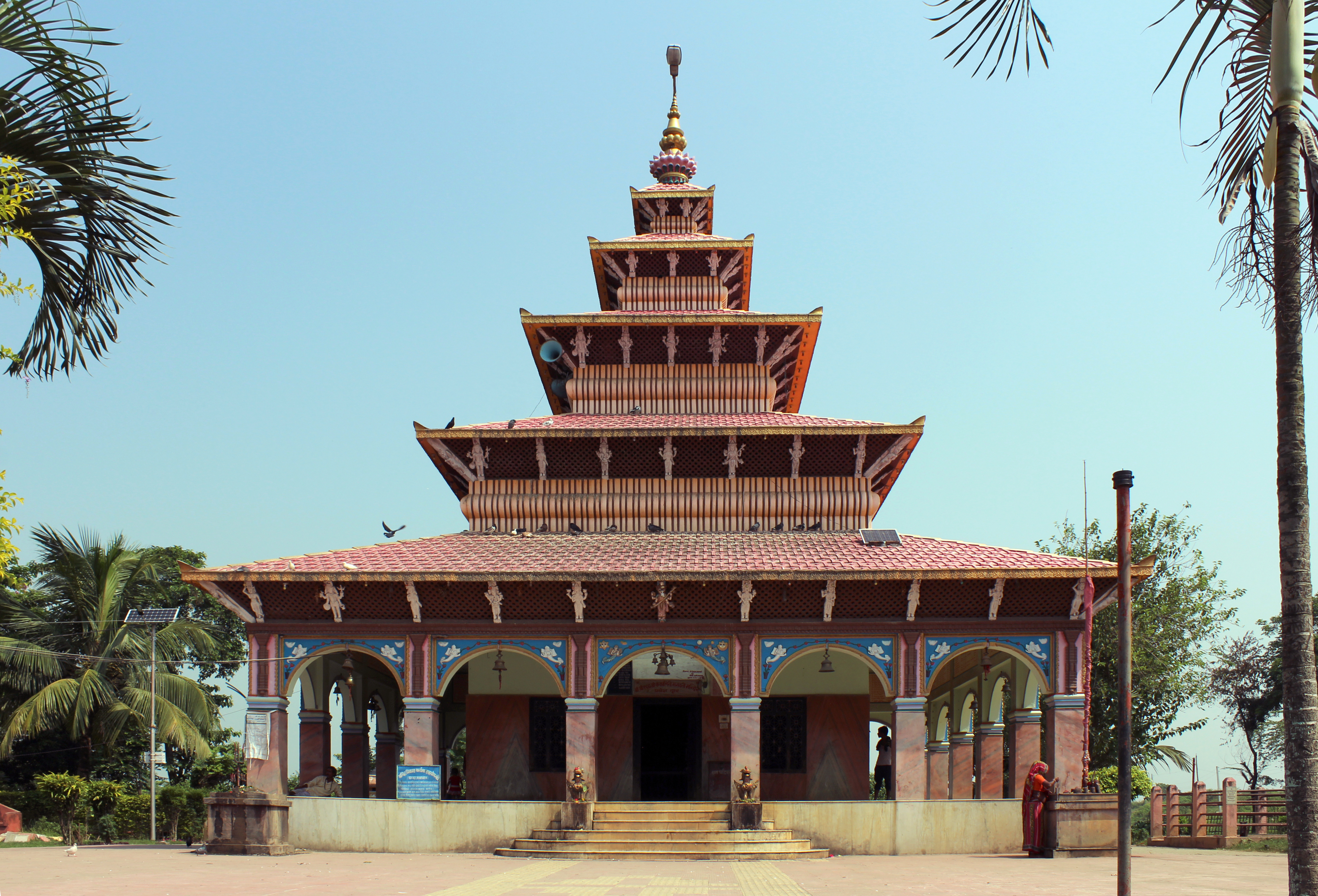

- Kankalini Temple in Nepal

Religion
- Affiliation: Hinduism
- District: Saptari
- Deity: Kankalini
- Festival: Dashahara/Dashami/Bada Dashain

Location
- Location: Bhardaha
- State: Madhesh
- Country: Nepal
- Coordinates: 26.55°N 86.92°E

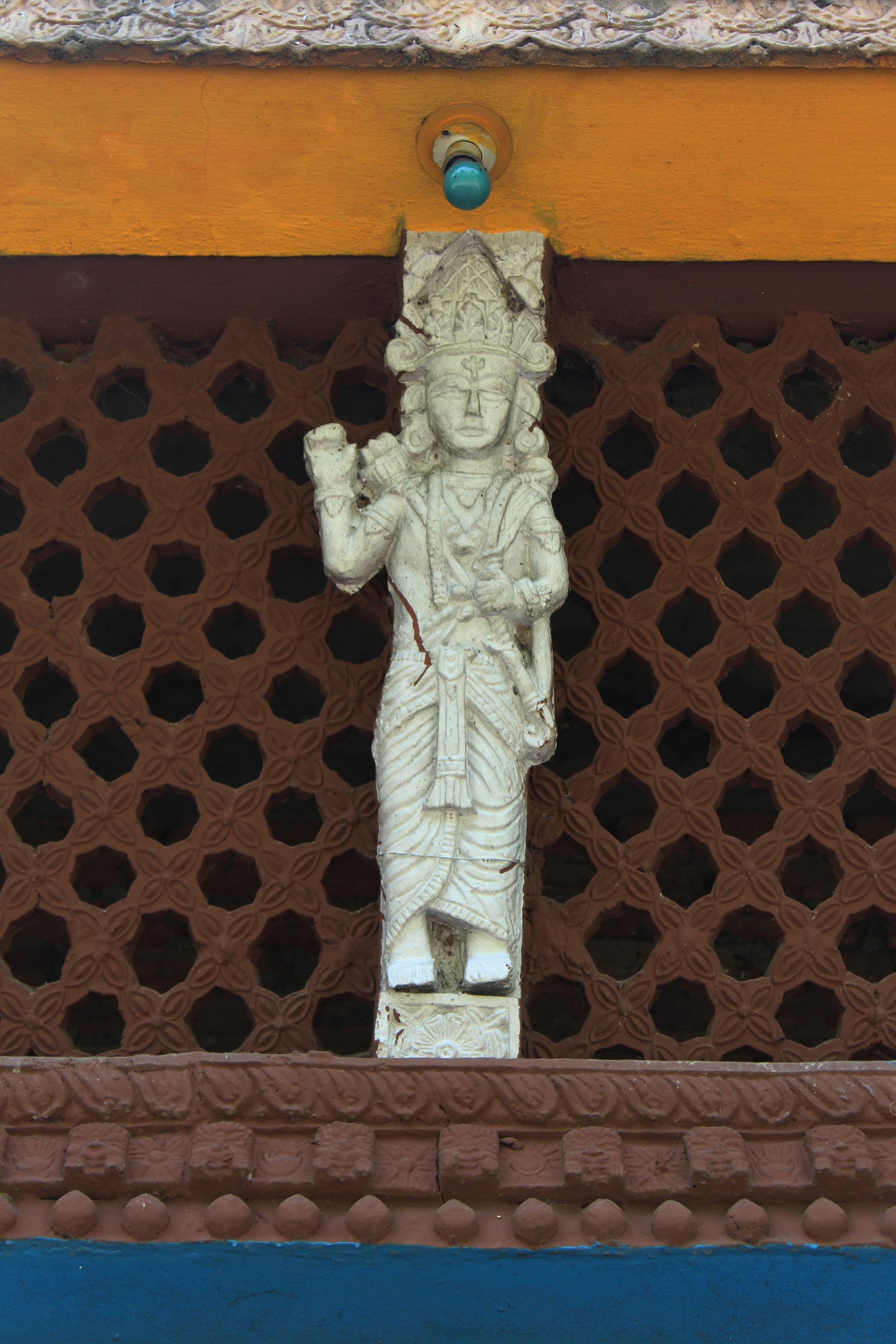
A sculpture of Krishna in the temple.

Kankalini Temple (Nepali language:कंकालिनी मन्दिर) is a temple and Shakta pithas in Eastern Nepal in Bhardaha VDC, Saptari, 19 km east of district headquarter Rajbiraj and near the Indian border at Birpur. It draws Nepali and Indian pilgrims, especially during Dashain when thousands of goats and Rangaa sacrificed there. The temple is near Mahendra Highway Bhardah section. It is famous temple of bhardaha.

== History ==
According to History and Hindu Legend during establishment of human village in Bhardaha, they found a stone statue of Durga while digging land there. At that time they settled the statue in Kankalini temple and start worshiping. It is believed that devotee wish come true when they pray goddess with great devotion.

== Transport ==
=== Road Transport ===
The Temple is on Mahendra Highway and easily accessible via road. it is at around 17 Km distance from nearest city Rajbiraj.

=== Air Transport ===
Rajbiraj Airport is the nearest airport roughly 20 KM away is located in District headquarter and nearest city Rajbiraj. Buddha Air operates daily flights between Rajbiraj and Kathmandu
