= List of monuments in Rautahat, Nepal =

This is a list of monuments in Rautahat District, Nepal as officially recognized by and available through the website of the Department of Archaeology, Nepal. Rautahat is a district of Province No. 2 and is located in central southern Nepal. Hindu temples are the main attraction of this district.

ID	Name	Type	Location	District	Coordinates	Image
NP-RH-01	Lakshminarayan Temple			Rautahat		Upload Photo Upload Photo
NP-RH-02	Bhagwati Temple			Rautahat		Upload Photo Upload Photo
NP-RH-03	Eshwarnath Mahadev Mat			Rautahat		Upload Photo Upload Photo
NP-RH-04	Ramjhanki Temple			Rautahat		Upload Photo Upload Photo

== See also ==
- List of monuments in Province No. 2
- List of monuments in Nepal
