= Kathauna =

Kathauna Bazar
- Headquarter of Municipality
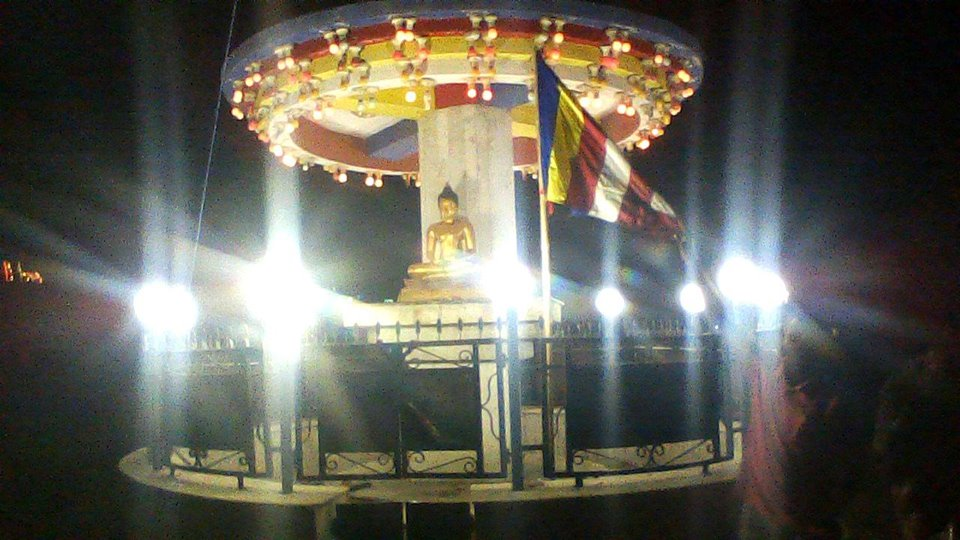
- Buddha Chowk at Kathauna Bazar
- Nickname: Headquarter of Shambhunath Municipality
- Motto: Develop as Tourism Center
- Location in Nepal
- Coordinates: 26.63°N 86.67°E
- Country: Nepal
- Zone: Sagarmatha Zone
- District: Saptari District
- Established: 2072-03-05

Government
  - Type: Municipality
  - Leader: Peshal Sh

Population (1991)
  - Total: 5,167
- Time zone: UTC+5:45 (Nepal Time)
- Area code: 031

Kathauna Bazar is a city in Shambhunath Municipality Ward No. 6, in the Saptari district of Nepal. It is 20 km east of Lahan Municipality, and is the central city of Shambhunath Municipality. Shambhunath municipality's head office is located at Kathauna Bazar. At the time of the 1991 Nepal census it had a population of 5167 people, living in 933 individual households.

== List of Educational Institutions in Kathauna Bazar ==
- Chaudhary Computer Training Center, Kathauna Bazar
- Sharda English Secondary School, Kathauna Bazar, Shambhunath Municipality
- Shree Buddhi Lal Bidya Munar H.S.S, Bhagwatpur
- Shree Shambhunath English Boarding School
- Shambhunath Training Institute

Health center

== List of Industries inside Kathauna Bazar ==
- Shree Ganesh Rice Mill
- Pramod Rice Mill

== List of Banks in Kathauna ==
- Rastriya Banijya Bank, Kathauna Bazar Branch
- Nirdhan Bank
- Mahuli Bikas Samudai

== Transport ==
=== Road ===
Buses of all classes (deluxe, air-conditioned, and regular) ply daily between Kathauna and major cities such as Biratnagar, Kathmandu, Pokhara, Birgunj and Kakarbhitta through Mahendra Highway.

=== Air ===
Kathauna is reached by Rajbiraj Airport since, a regular scheduled flight has been organized from Rajbiraj, the flight was halted since 2007. See Rajbiraj Airport.
