= Dinesh Kumar Yadav =

Nepalese politician

Honourable Dinesh Kumar Yadav
- दिनेश कुमार यादव

Member of Parliament, Pratinidhi Sabha
- Incumbent
- Assumed office 22 December 2022
- Constituency: Saptari 3

Personal details
- Born: 20 November 1960 (age 65) Saptari District
- Party: Nepali Congress
- Spouse: Nirmala Kumari Yadav
- Parent: Dev Narayan Yadav (father)

Dinesh Kumar Yadav is a Nepalese politician, belonging to the Nepali Congress currently serving as a member of the 2nd Federal Parliament of Nepal. In the 2022 Nepalese general election, he won the election from Saptari 3 (constituency).
