= Chandrabhoga Gadhi =

- चन्द्रभोगा गढी (Nepali)
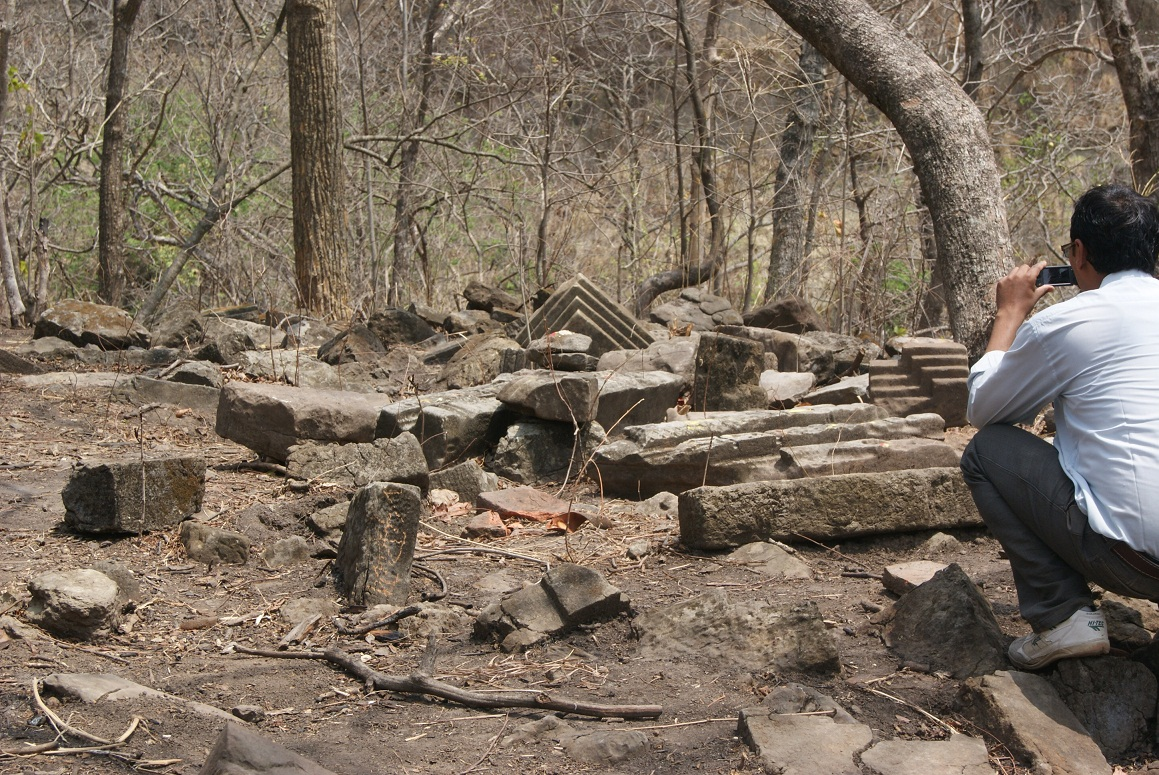
- Chandrabhoga Gadhi

- Location within Nepal
- 26.668989°N 86.6865608°E
- Type: Fortification
- Location: Saptari District, Shambhunath, Nepal

History
- Abandoned: Yes
- Event: Baishakh Purnima

Site notes
- Public access: Yes

Chandrabhoga Gadhi (Nepali: चन्द्रभोगा गढी) is a historical ruined fort located in Shambhunath, Saptari District, Nepal. The fort is located in the Rupani- Shambhunath Chure hill section north west of Kanakpatti village around 4 km. The hill fort was originally built by the Senas of Makwanpur in the 15th century. The temple of Chandrabhoga- clan deity of Sena was built by 27th Sena King Chandrasen. The fort is locally known as Chanarbhoga Gadhi and is believed to be the remnants of the Ekagarh, the palace of Sen Kings during winter season.

== History ==
The historical gadhi was believed to be made by King Chandrasen. The Senas of Bengal was enter Nepal in early 13th century from eastern part. The place Rupnagar in Saptari district was the earliest capital seat of Sena Kings of Nepal region. After the settlement in the Saptari district, they expanded their rule towards the Makawanpur in late 13th century. Finally, the kingdom of Senas was ended by the rising power of Gorkhalis in 18th century.

== Religious significance ==
In the first month of the Nepali Calendar, Baishakh the local people visit the place and sacrifice a goat to the deity Chanarbhoga.

== Gallery ==
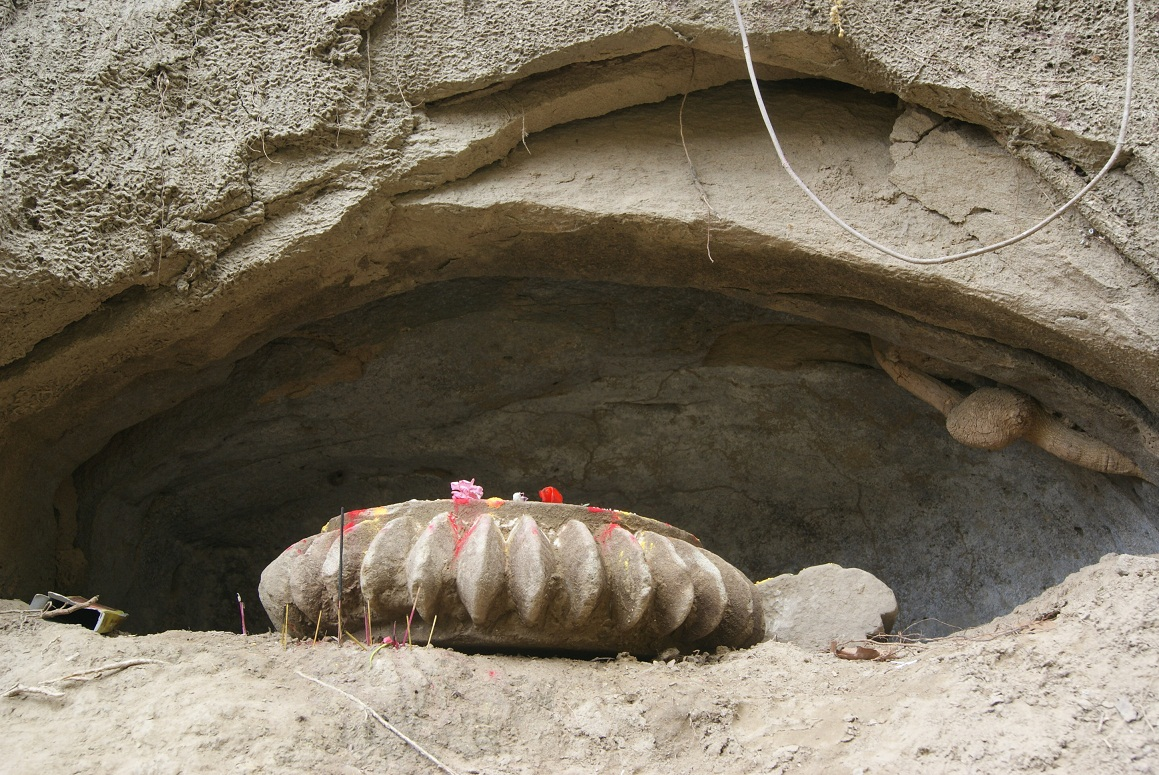

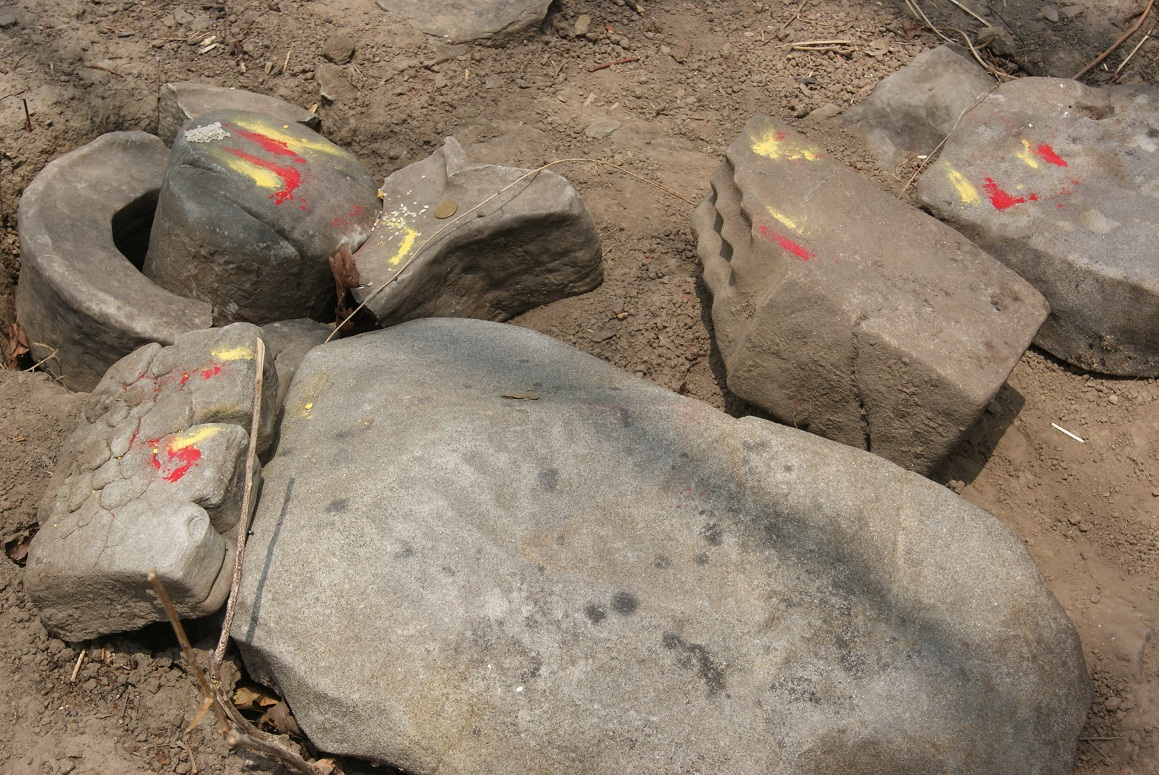
