= Rupani Rural Municipality =

Rural Municipality in Madhesh Province, Nepal

Rupani रूपनी
- Rural Municipality (Gaunpalika)
- Location in Nepal
- Coordinates: 26.62°N 86.69°E
- Country: Nepal
- Zone: Sagarmatha Zone
- Province: Province No. 2
- District: Saptari District
- No. of Wards: 6
- Formed as a Rural Municipality: 2073/11/27

Government
  - Type: Local
  - President: Dinesh kumar Yadav (LSP)
  - Vice President: Puspa Shrestha Laugi
  - Chief Administrative Officer: Arbinda Kumar Chaudhary

Area
  - Total: 56.08 km^{2} (21.65 sq mi)
- Elevation: 242.78 m (796.5 ft)

Population (2019 est.)
  - Total: 29,989
  - Density: 534.8/km^{2} (1,385/sq mi)
- Time zone: UTC+5:45 (Nepal Standard Time)
- Postal code: 56405
- Area code: 031
- Website: http://www.rupanimun.gov.np/

Rupani (Nepali: रुपनी) is a small rural municipality in Saptari District in the Sagarmatha Zone of south-eastern Nepal. At the time of the 2019 Nepal census it had a population of 29,989 people living in about 8500 individual households.

The rural municipality comprises villages like Nakati-Rayapur, Lauwapar, Peeprahi, Pauwa, Kataiya, Hardiya, Makari Tole, Jamuni Madhepura, Laxmipur, Chhapki, Bhathail Tole, Basbitti, Musharniya, Kumraul, Dhargaun Tole, Terhauta, Kolhuwa, Jagmohan, Naya Basti, Deuhela Tole, and Birendra Bazaar.

== Cultural Traditions ==
Major religious celebrations include the major Hindu festivals Vijaya Dashami, Dipawali, Chhath, Holi, Ram Navami, Janai Purnima or Rakshabandhan, Saraswati Puja or Vasant Panchami, Jitiya, Chauthi Chan or Chaurchan, Vishwakarma Puja, Govardhan Puja, Bhai Tika, Chaite Dashain and so on. The Dashain, Deepawali, Chhath, Holi and Muslim festival "Eid al-Fitr" and "Eid al-Adha" are heavily celebrated with full devotee and proper rules. The locals people take pride in the way these festivals are celebrated with joy and happiness.

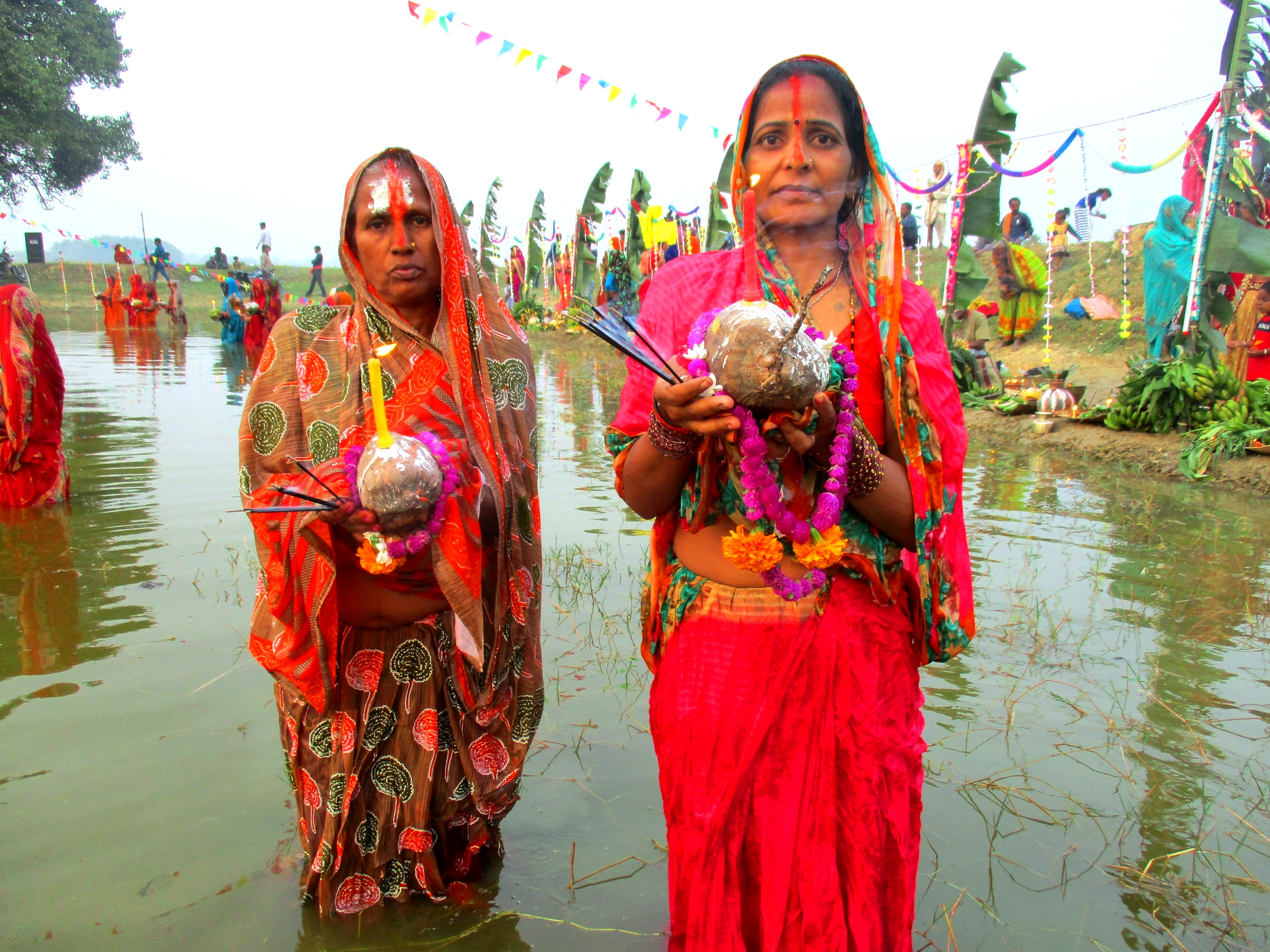
Celebrating Chhath in Kataiya, Saptari by giving Argha to Sun God

== Religious Sites ==
Though its name is given after Rupani Devi. It is popular for Shiva Sani Dham in the northern part of Chure hills which is about 6.5 km (4.0 mi) from the East-West Highway and Dinaram Bhadri Temple in Kataiya. People use to visit there in huge numbers on Saturday to worship Shani Dev. Dinaram Bhadri is the deity god of Musahar people. There are many small temples including Dihabar and Rajaji Than (worship place of village elder and deity), Hanuman temple, and mosques etc.
