= Shambhunath =

Shambhunath शम्भुनाथ नगरपालिका
- Municipality
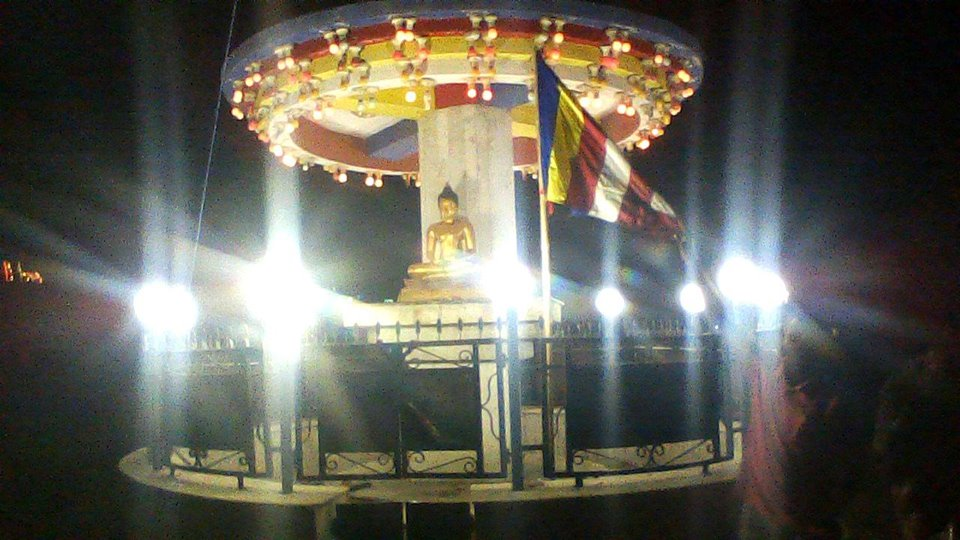
- Buddha Chok at Kathauna Bazar

- Location in Madhesh Province Shambhunath (Nepal)
- Coordinates: 26.63°N 86.67°E
- Country: Nepal
- Zone: Sagarmatha
- District: Saptari

Government
  - Mayor: Jitendra Prasad Gupta Kalwar (CPN (US))
  - Deputy Mayor: Anita Kumari Chaudhary (CPN (US))

Area
  - Total: 108.71 km^{2} (41.97 sq mi)

Population (2011)
  - Total: 38,018
  - Density: 349.72/km^{2} (905.77/sq mi)
- Time zone: UTC+5:45 (NST)
- Website: www.shambhunathmun.gov.np

Shambhunath Municipality is a Town in Saptari District in the Sagarmatha Zone of south-eastern Nepal. Merging the existing Khoksar Parbaha, Shambhunath, Mohanpur, Bhangha, Basbalpur and Rampur Jamuwa village development committee this new municipality was formed on 18 May 2014. Kathauna Bazar is now finally head office of this new municipality. At the time of the 1991 Nepal census it had a population of 5168 people living in 933 individual households.

== See also ==
- Shambhunath Temple
- Kanakpatti Palace
