= Sagarmatha Zone =

Coordinates: 27°20′N 86°40′E

Sagarmatha Zone सगरमाथा अञ्चल
- Former Zone
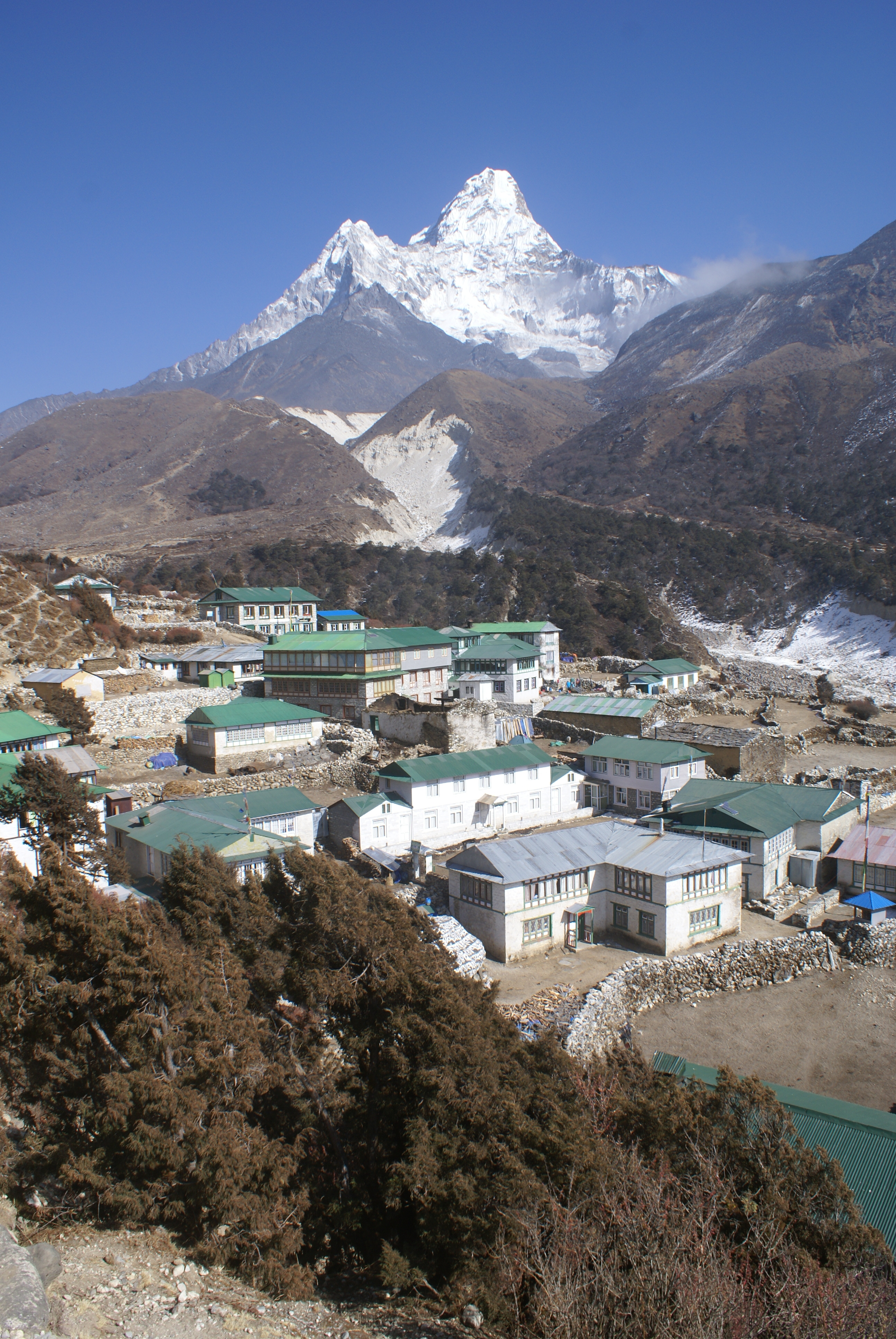
- Lower Pangboche village in Khumbu, Nepal

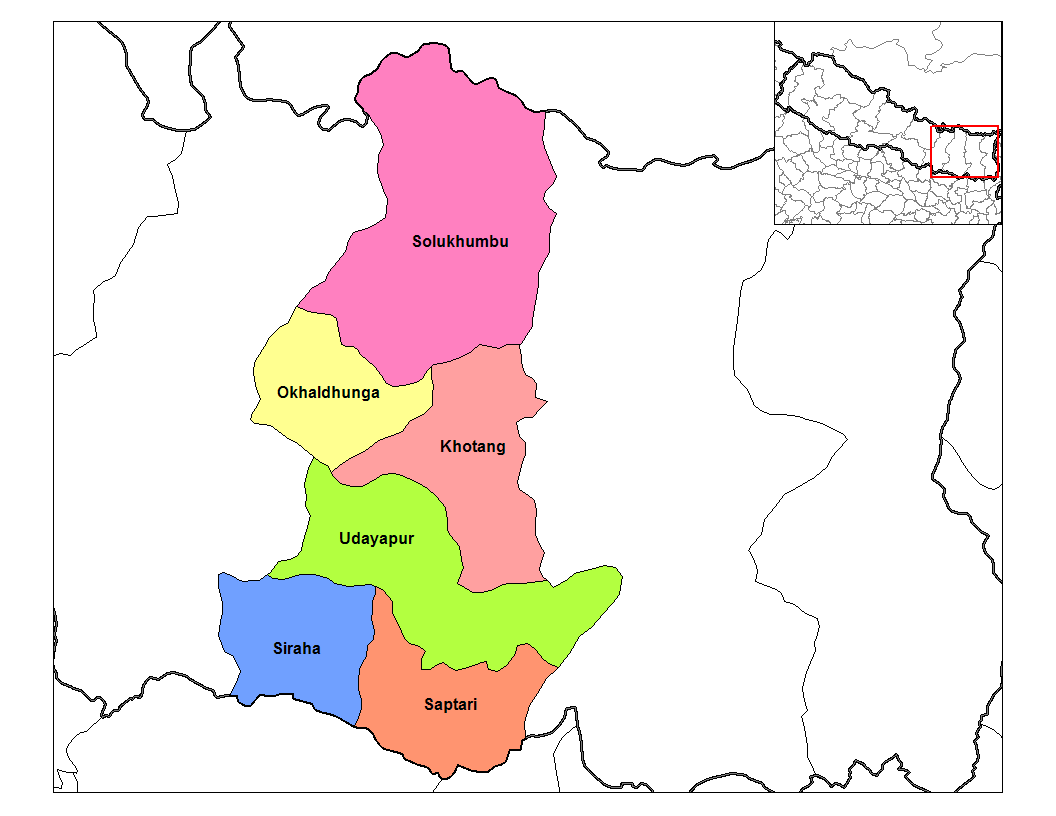
- Country: Nepal
- Time zone: UTC+5:45 (Nepal Time)

Sagarmāthā Zone (Nepali: सगरमाथा अञ्चल, [sʌgʌrmatʰa ʌnt͡sʌl] "Sagarmāthā Anchal") was one of the fourteen zones of Nepal until the restructuring of zones into provinces. The headquarters of Sagarmatha is Rajbiraj. Sagarmāthā is a Nepali word which as per some sources, is derived from सगर ("sagar", sky) and माथा ("māthā", head).

It includes mountain districts of the Himalayas (including the world's highest peak Mount Everest) in the north, hill districts in the center, and valley districts of the Terai in the south. It is bordered by China to the north, India to the south, the Kosi Zone to the east and the Janakpur Zone to the west.

== Administrative subdivisions ==
Sagarmāthā was divided into six districts; since 2015 the four northern districts have been redesignated as part of Province No. 1, while the two southernmost districts have been resigned as part of Province No. 2.

| District | Type | Headquarters | Since 2015 part of Province |
|---|---|---|---|
| Khotang | Hill | Diktel | Province No. 1 |
| Okhaldhunga | Hill | Okhaldhunga | Province No. 1 |
| Solukhumbu | Mountain | Salleri | Province No. 1 |
| Udayapur | Inner Terai | Triyuga | Province No. 1 |
| Saptari | Outer Terai | Rajbiraj | Province No. 2 |
| Siraha | Outer Terai | Siraha | Province No. 2 |

The main city of the Sagarmāthā Zone was Rajbiraj which was also the headquarters. Other towns of the Sagarmāthā hill area were Katari, Okhaldhunga, Diktel, Salleri and Namche Bazaar; while Kathauna, Lahan, Fatepur, Rajbiraj and Siraha are in the outer Terai. Triyuga is an emerging city in the zone.

== Name origin ==
Sagarmāthā Zone took its name from "Sagarmāthā" which is the Nepalese name for Mount Everest (Sagarmāthā), which is located in the very north of the zone within the Sagarmatha National Park (1,148 km^{2}) in the Solu Khumbu district of Nepal.

Sagarmāthā means "the Head in the Great Blue Sky" derived from सगर (sagar) meaning "sky" and माथा (māthā) meaning "head" in the Nepali Language.

== See also ==
- Province No. 1
- Development Regions of Nepal (Former)
- List of zones of Nepal (Former)
- List of districts of Nepal
- Sagarmatha National Park
