= List of schools in Nepal =

The following is a list of notable secondary schools in Nepal. Tertiary schools are included in the separate list of universities and colleges in Nepal.

There are 77 districts and this list is grouped alphabetically by district. This list includes schools of international and national standard from various districts.

== Bhaktapur District ==
- Basu Higher Secondary School, Bhaktapur
- Birendra Sainik Awasiya Mahavidyalaya - Sallaghari, Bhaktapur

== Chitwan District ==
- Buddha Shanti Higher Secondary School, Rapti
- Chitwan Higher Secondary School
- Daisy School, Khairahani-8
- Jana Adarsha Multiple Campus, Rapti
- Nepal Police School, Chitwan
- Secondary School Gawai - Gawai, Khairahani-13

== Dang District ==
- Mid-Western Regional Police Boarding School - Ghorahi
- Padmodaya Public Model Secondary School - Ghorahi

== Dhading District ==
- Dhunibeshi Academy, Dhunibesi-07

== Dhankuta District ==
- Naxal School for the Deaf, Bal Mandir

== Gorkha District ==
- Paropakar Adarsha Uccha Madhyamik Vidhalaya, Jaubari, Gandaki

== Ilam District ==
- Tri-Ratna Secondary School, refugee camp near Chulachuli Rural Municipality

== Jhapa District ==
- Balmiki Education Foundation, Birtamod-1
- Blooming Lotus English School, Goldhap refugee camp
- Damak Model Higher Secondary School — Damak-10
- Emerald Academy, Bhadrapur Municipality
- Gyanjyoti Higher Secondary School — Rajgadh-6
- Himalaya Higher Secondary School, Damak-2
- Shree Adarsh Vidya Mandir Higher Secondary School
- Shree Harikul Model Higher Secondary School — Kankai Municipality, Surunga
- Shree Mahendra Secondary School, Sharanamati, (Jhapa)
- Siddhartha Boarding Secondary School, Damak-7

== Kailali District ==
- Far Western Regional Police Boarding School, Dhangadi
- Sainik Awasiya Mahavidyalaya Teghari Kailali, Teghari

== Kanchanpur District ==
- Adarsh Vidya Niketan Secondary School, Bhimdatta
- Shree Diamond Public Academy, Gaddachauki

== Kaski District ==
- Bishwo Shanti Higher Secondary School, Deurali
- Gandaki Boarding School, Lamachaur
- Mount Everest Boarding School, Pokhara
- Paramount Public School, Pokhara
- Shree Amarsingh Model Higher Secondary School, Pokhara
- Shree Mahendra Secondary School Bhalam, (Pokhara)
- SOS Hermann Gmeiner Higher Secondary School, Pokhara

== Kathmandu District ==
- Amrit Campus, Lainchaur, Kathmandu
- Bhanubhakta Memorial Higher Secondary School, Panipokhari, Kathmandu
- Bhimeshwor Academy, Gothatar-8
- Budhanilkantha School, Budhanilkantha
- Capital College and Research Centre, Balkumari
- Chelsea International Academy, Attarkhel, Gokarneshwor
- Durbar High School, Kathmandu
- Galaxy Public School, Gyaneshwar
- Green Hills Academy, Kavresthali, Kathmandu
- Himshikhar English Boarding School, Kalanki, Kathmandu
- International French School of Kathmandu, Lazimpat
- Juddhodaya Public High School, Kathmandu
- Kanjirowa National School, Koteshwor
- Kathmandu National School, Old Baneshour, Kathmandu
- Kavresthali Secondary School, Kavresthali
- Laboratory School, Kirtipur
- Laligurans Batika Secondary School, Bidhyanagar, Koteshwor
- Manakamana Higher Secondary School, Jorpati
- Miniland English High School, Thali, Kageshwari-Manohara
- Naaya Aayam Multi-Disciplinary Institute, Baneswor
- National School of Sciences, Lainchour
- Nepal Armed Police Force School, Kirtipur
- Nepal Police Secondary School, Samakhusi
- N. K. Singh Memorial English Preparatory School, Baneshwor, Kathmandu
- Nobel Academy, New Baneshwor
- Siddhartha Vanasthali Institute
- St. Xavier's College, Maitighar
- V.S. Niketan Higher Secondary School, Tinkune-32
- Xavier Academy, Lazimpat

== Kavrepalanchok District ==
- Kathmandu University High School, Chaukot, Panauti
- Kshitij English Boarding School, Banepa-10
- Malpi International School, Malpi-9, Panauti
- Rambhakta Memorial School, Banepa-8
- Shree Ganesh Secondary School, Bhimkhori-8, Shikharpur

== Lalitpur District ==
- Adarsha Vidya Mandir Higher Secondary School (AVM), Lalitpur
- The British School, Kathmandu, Sanepa
- Little Angels' School (L.A.S), Hattiban
- Mount Olive English Secondary School, Siddhipur
- Shree Kitini (10+2) Higher Secondary School, Taukhel
- St. Xavier's School, Godavari
- St. Xavier's School, Jawalakhel
- Yala Newa International School, Lalitpur

== Mahottari District ==
- Advance Learners Himalayan English Boarding Secondary School (ALHEBS), Jaleshwar
- Ram Narayan Ayodhya Higher Secondary School, Pipra
- Shonphi Dashain Higher Secondary School, Aurahi-3

== Makwanpur District ==
- Janapriya Higher Secondary School, Hetauda

== Morang District ==
- Eden National Boarding School, Biratnagar
- Janasewa Secondary School, Ramailo
- Jante Higher Secondary School, Jante-02
- Triveni Baljagat English School, Bayarban-7, Ramailo

== Nawalparasi District ==
- Divya Jyoti Higher Secondary School, Bardaghat-2
- Vishwajyoti Higher Secondary School, Pragatinagar-3

== Pyuthan District ==
- Mukti High School, Ratamata-03, Pyuthan Municipality

== Rautahat District ==
- Mid Regional Police Boarding School, Jigadhiya

== Rupandehi District ==
- Butwal Technical Institute, Butwal
- Eden English Boarding High School, Butwal-16
- Kanti Higher Secondary School, Butwal
- Shree Janata Higher Secondary School – West Amamwa-6
- Shree Shivapur Higher Secondary School, Makrahar

== Saptari District ==
- Happyland Higher Secondary School, Rajbiraj
- Premier Secondary Boarding School, Rajbiraj

== Sunsari District ==
- Eastern Regional Police Boarding High School, Dharan
- Godawari Vidhya Mandir, Itahari
- Navjyoti English School, Dharan-15
- Nawayug Academy Higher Secondary School, Inaruwa-9
- Parvat Secondary Boarding School, Dharan

== Surkhet District ==
- Nepal Police School, Surkhet

== Syangja District ==
- Shree Sankhar Mohami Secondary School – Mohami, Sankhar
- Shree Radha Damodar Gyan Jyoti Higher Secondary School, Rimaldihi, Sankhar

== Tanahun District ==
- Notre Dame School, Bandipur
- Western Regional Police Boarding High School, Belchautara

== Tehrathum District ==
- Singha Bahini Higher Secondary School – Myanglung-2
- Singha Devi Middle Secondary School, Ishibu

== Udayapur District ==
- Udayapur Secondary English School - Gaighat

== See also ==
- Education in Nepal
- Lists of schools
