= Shree Ganesh Secondary School =

- श्री गणेश माध्यामिक बिद्यालय
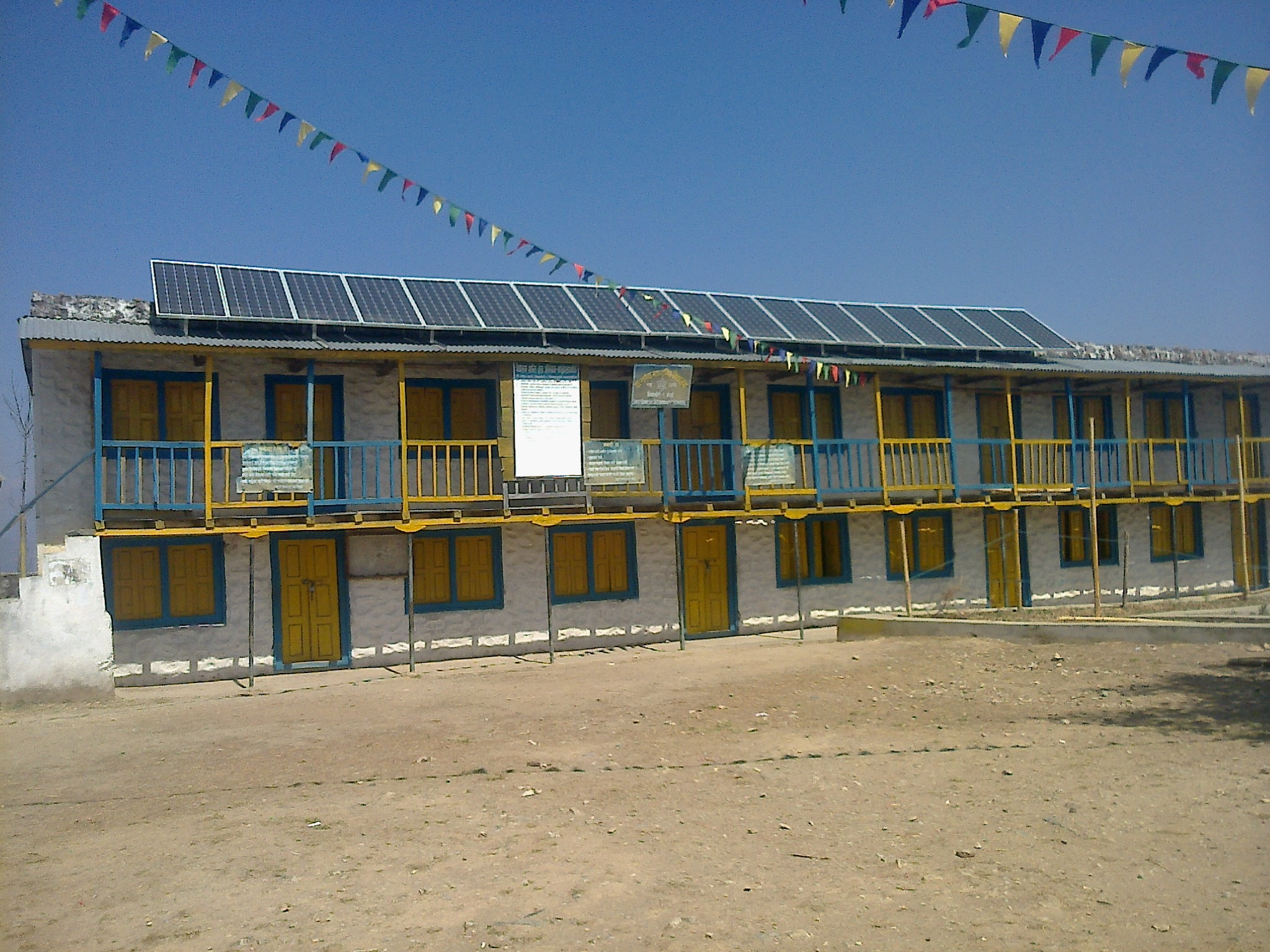
- Shree Ganesh Secondary School

Location
- Bhimkhori-8, Shikharpur; Nepal

Information
- Type: Government school, Secondary school
- Established: 1963
- School district: Kavrepalanchowk
- Principal: Tirthalal Moktan
- Enrollment: 400+
- Affiliations: School Leaving Certificate (SLC)
- Magazine published: Ganesh Jyoti
- Grade: Grade 1 to Grade 10

Shree Ganesh Secondary School is a government school located in Bhimkhori-8, Shikharpur, Kavre. The school was founded in 1963. This school offers classes from grade 1 to grade 10. This school provides education to more than 400 students from the Kavrepalanchowk district. ()

== Magazine published by Shree Ganesh Secondary School ==
- Ganesh Jyoti - 2013, Shree Ganesh School, Kavre

== Bibliography ==
- Ganesh Jyoti - 2013, Shree Ganesh School, Kavre

== See also ==
- List of schools in Nepal
- School Leaving Certificate (Nepal)
