= Himshikhar English Boarding School =

Private boarding school in Kathmandu, Nepal

- Kathmandu; Nepal

Information
- School type: Boarding school

Himshikhar English Boarding School is a private boarding school located at Kalanki, Kathmandu, Nepal.

== See also ==
- List of schools in Nepal
- School Leaving Certificate (Nepal)
