= Kshitij English Boarding School =

- क्षितिज ईंग्लिश बोर्डिङ स्कुल

Location
- Bhakteshwor Marga, Banepa-10; Banepa; Nepal
- Coordinates: 27.62593°N 85.53117°E

Information
- Type: Independent school, Boarding school, Secondary school
- Motto: "Education for Physical, Moral and Spiritual Development"
- Patron saint: Govindalal Pradhananga
- Established: 2006
- School district: Kavrepalanchowk
- Chairman: Bikash Shrestha
- Principal: Mr. Liladhar Poudel
- Enrollment: 900 approximately
- Nickname: K.E.B.S.
- Affiliations: School Leaving Certificate (SLC)
- Magazine published: Kshitij Deep
- Grade: Playgroup to Grade 10
- Website: N/A

Kshitij English Boarding School (KEBS) is a private boarding school situated in the heart of Bhakteshwor Marga, Banepa-10, Kavrepalanchowk district. It was founded in 2006.

This school has been running from class Playgroup to class X. The school has been providing education to more than 900 students of Kavrepalanchowk district especially Banepa.

== History ==
The founder of Kshitij School Mr. Govindala Pradhananga was the principal of Kavre Higher Secondary School. He was abandoned and started this school with the support of Mr. Ramesh Prasad Sapkota, Ram kumar Gelal, Chandra Prasad Tajpuria, Thakur Dahal and members named as Rajan Prasad Sapkota, Upendra sapkota, Hari Krishna Timilsina, Purnima Pradhananga, Late Rama Badal, Bimala Sharma,Om krishna Pradhan and so on.

In 2014, Govindalal Pradhananga is the patron of the school and Mr. Harigopal Pradhananga is the chairperson of this school. Recently the founding principal, Mr. Ramesh Prasad Sapkota resigned from his post and Mr. Liladhar Paudyal has been appointed as the principal of this school.

== See also ==
- List of schools in Nepal
- School Leaving Certificate (Nepal)
- Education in Nepal

== Bibliography ==
- Kshitij Deep, 2013, Kshitij School, Banepa, Nepal
