= Shree Sankhar Mohami Secondary School =

Government secondary school in Sankhar, Nepal

- श्री साँखर मोहमी माध्यामिक बिद्यालय
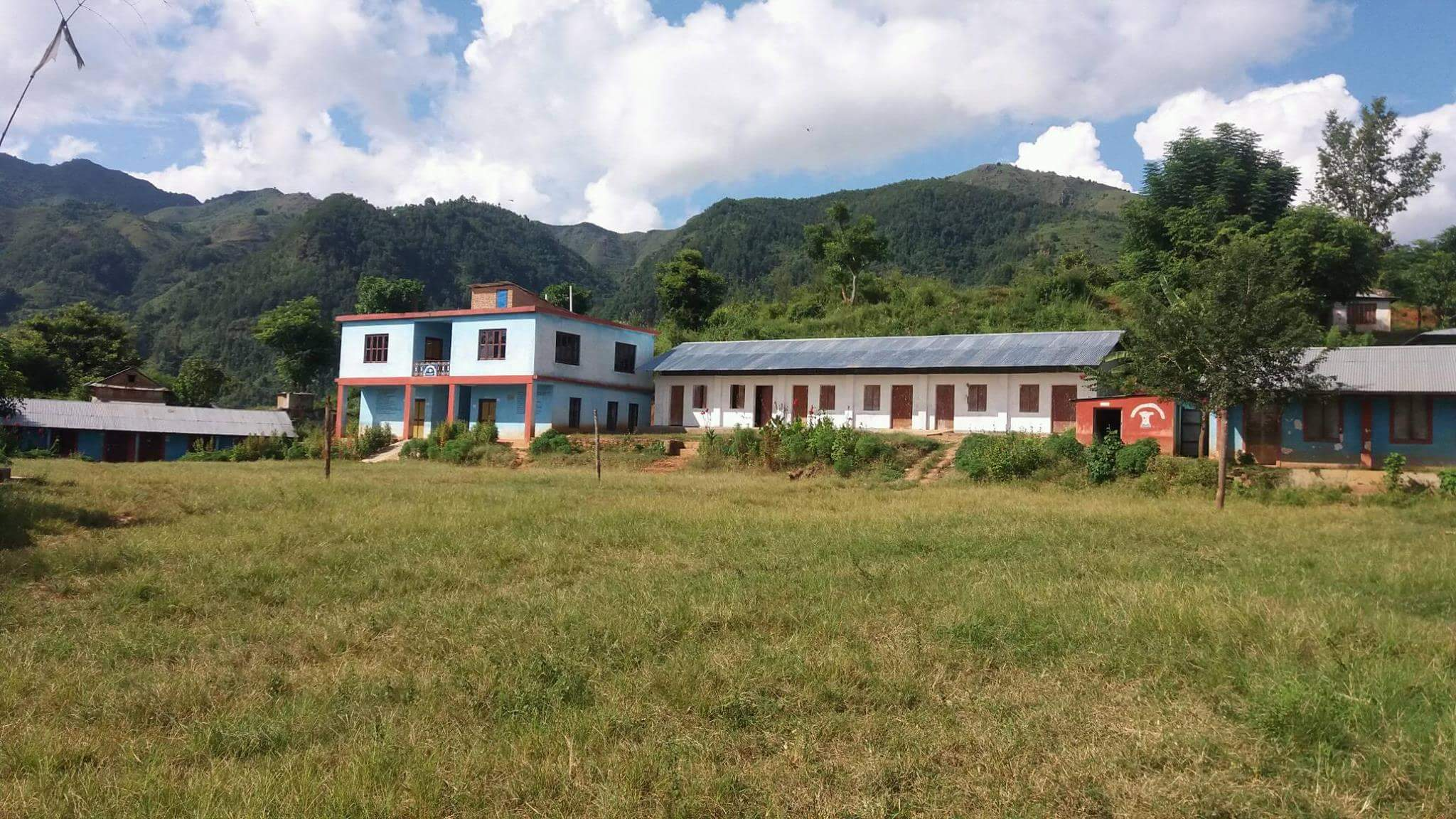
- Shree Sankhar Mohami Secondary School's newly constructed buildings.

Location
- Mohami; Sankhar; Nepal
- Coordinates: 27.899269°N 83.933697°E

Information
- Type: Government school, Secondary school
- Established: 1958
- School district: Syangja District
- Principal: Dev Raj Bhattarai
- Enrollment: 400+
- Affiliations: School Leaving Certificate (SLC)
- Grade: Grade 1 to Grade 10
- Website: N/A

Shree Sankhar Mohami Secondary School is a government school situated at Mohami, Sankhar VDC-4, Syangja District, Gandaki Zone, Nepal. It was founded in 1958. This school has been running from class 1 to class 10. This school has been providing education to more than 400 students of Sankhar VDC (Village Development Committee).

== Magazine ==
- Golden Jubilee is published in 2010.

== See also ==
- List of schools in Nepal
- School Leaving Certificate (Nepal)
