= Shree Mahendra Secondary School =

- Nepali: श्री महेन्द्र माध्यमिक विद्यालय
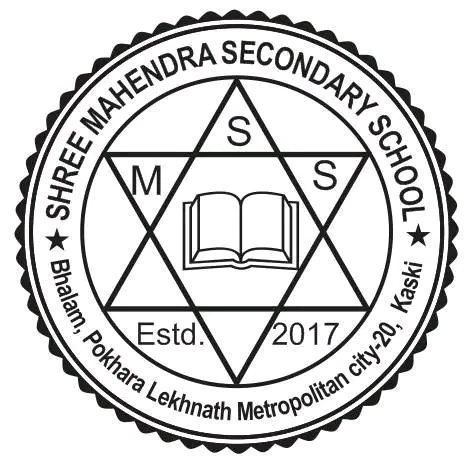

Location
- Bhalam, Pokhara; Kaski District, Gandaki Province, 33700; Nepal; 28.26°N 84.01°E

Information
- School type: Community
- Motto: Improving Agriculture Improving Life
- Established: 20 April 1960 A.D (14 Jestha, 2016 B.S)
- Founder: The Local Community
- Status: Open
- School district: Kaski
- Principal: Bodh Raj Paudel
- Staff: 35 (approx.)
- Employees: 5
- Age: 3 to 19
- Enrollment: 350 (approx.)
- Average class size: 30-35
- Language: English, Nepalese
- Hours in school day: 6-8
- Houses: Four (Red, Blue, Green, Yellow)
- Nickname: MSS
- Affiliations: School Leaving Certificate (Grade 10); Higher Secondary Education Board (10+2)
- Website: mahendramavi.edu.np

Shree Mahendra Secondary School (Nepali:श्री महेन्द्र माध्यमिक विद्यालय), (often referred as M.S.S), formerly known as Mahendra Higher Secondary School, is a model government school of Nepal, established on 26 April 1960 in the village of Bhalam, 1.5 kilometers distance from Pokhara. It is the first and the only secondary school of the village.

== History ==
=== Establishment ===
Shree Mahendra Secondary School, initially established as a primary school on 14 Baisakh, 2017, was upgraded to a lower secondary school in the year 2021, and in the year 2025, the ninth grade was introduced to expand into a secondary school, followed by the introduction of the tenth grade from the academic session of the year 2026. Therefore, this Shree Mahendra Secondary School is a community school located in Bhalam, Pokhara Lekhnath Metropolitan City Ward No. 20 of Kaski District. In this school, where the medium of instruction is English, a technical stream is offered starting from class 9. It is the only school in the Kaski district area where the technical stream is operating under Nepal Government and it is the only school in the district offering classes from 9 to 12 specializing in plant science.

== Facilities and activities ==
=== Health Center ===
The health center takes care of minor illnesses and first aid services. Serious cases are referred to larger hospitals in Pokhara. A CMA counselor and a nurse are in charge of the health center and health education classes.

=== Science Laboratories ===
The laboratories are for the science courses throughout classes 4 to 12. Each class has STEM lab practical sessions. In addition to the science teachers, the science department has three lab assistants who maintain the laboratory equipment and facilities.

=== English Lab ===
The English Lab at Shree Mahendra Secondary School is a new and innovative facility designed to enhance students' English language skills. This lab features various specialized boards, each tailored to different aspects of language learning, and incorporates modern technologies to facilitate interactive and effective teaching. The lab is among the few in the region to offer such advanced resources, setting the school apart from many others.

=== Hostels ===
There are two hostels in MSS; one for boy and one for girl.

=== Library ===
The library was established in the school with Set up in a simple room with limited resources, it now stands as one of the some well-equipped libraries in the village. It has more than 10,000 books including fiction, non-fiction, and reference.

Library studies form a part of the school curriculum, in the course of which all students learn the positive use and exploitation of the library and its materials. Library projects are assessed as a component of the termly examination marks from grades 4 to 6.

=== Houses and annual competitions ===
Students are divided into four houses:

- Red (red)
- Yellow (yellow)
- Green (green)
- Blue (blue)

The four houses compete in annual activities.

- Annual Sports Day (athletics)
- Inter-House sports competitions: football, volleyball, basketball, cricket (boys), rounders (girls), badminton, table tennis, soft tennis.
- Inter-House academic competitions: general knowledge, essay writing (English and Nepali), speech (English and Nepali), debate(English and Nepali).
