= Bhimeshwor Academy =

- Gothatar-8, Kandagharai; Nepal

Information
- Type: Private School, Secondary school
- Motto: "Scientific and Qualitative Education is our motto"
- Established: 2006
- School district: Kathmandu
- Chairman: Durga Prasad Ghimire
- Principal: Amrit Kumar Khadka
- Staff: 20+
- Grades: Nursery to 10
- Affiliation: School Leaving Certificate (Nepal)
- Website: www.bhimeshworacademy.com

Bhimeshwor Academy is a secondary school situated at Gothatar-8, Kandaghari, Kathmandu, Nepal. It was established in 2006 (2062 B.S.). It is providing education to about 500 students from grades Nursery to 10. It is affiliated under School Leaving Certificate (SLC).

== History ==
It was started with motto "Scientific and Qualitative Education is our motto" from class Nursery to 5. By 2014, it is running up to class 12.

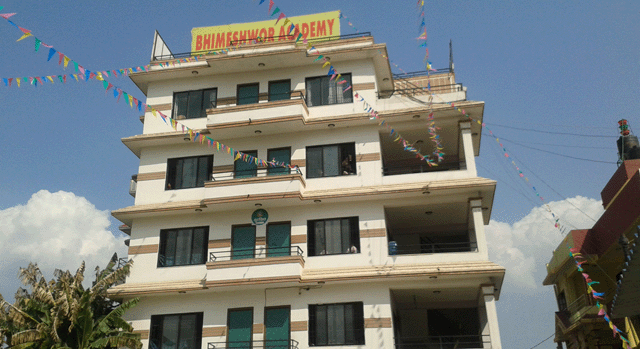
Bhimeshwor Academy

== See also ==
- List of schools in Nepal
- School Leaving Certificate (Nepal)
