= Shree Adarsh Vidya Mandir Higher Secondary School =

School in Jhapa district, Nepal

Coordinates: 26.633331°N 87.983331°E

- Nepali: श्री आदर्श विद्या मन्दिर उ.मा.वि.

Information
- Established: 1966; 59 years ago
- Teaching staff: c.35
- Enrollment: c.700

Shree Adarsh Vidya Mandir (Nepali: श्री आदर्श विद्या मन्दिर उ.मा.वि., romanized: shri adarsh vidya mandir u.maa.vi., lit. 'Shree Adarsh Vidya Mandir U.M.V.') school is a government run public school located in Jhapa, Nepal. It was established in 1966 (2014 B.S.) There are about 35 teachers and 700 students in this school. It lies in the middle of Jhapa district. There are two large buildings and a temple of the goddess Saraswati. The school is facilitated with a science library, projector room and computer classes. There is also a library class, where students go for reading books and learning. There is one big open play ground for football, cricket and volleyball.

The school was supported by the Indian embassy to construct/renovate its infrastructure in 2007.

== See also ==
- List of schools in Nepal
