= Secondary School Gawai =

Public secondary school in Chitwan, Nepal

- माध्यमिक विद्यालय गवै
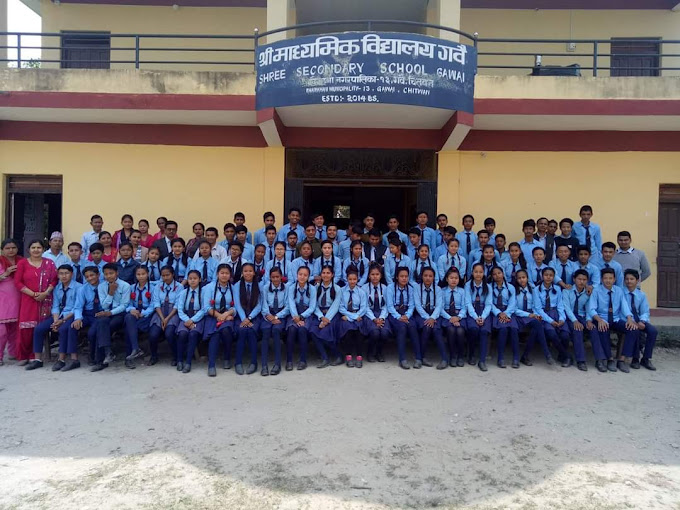
- SEE Batch of 2075 B.S.

Location
- Gawai; Khairahani, Bagmati Province, 44203; Nepal
- Coordinates: 27.5707°N 84.5381°E

Information
- Other name: Gawai Secondary School
- Type: Public
- Established: 2014 B.S. (1957 A.D.)
- Principal: Rishi Khanal
- Staff: 25
- Grades: Nursery–12
- Enrolment: 400
- Language: English, Nepali
- Schedule: 10:00 am – 4:00 pm

Secondary School Gawai (Nepali: माध्यमिक विद्यालय गवै) is a public secondary school located in Gawai, Ward No. 13 of Khairahani Municipality in Chitwan District, Bagmati Province, Nepal.

The school was established in 2014 B.S. (1957 A.D.) under the name Gawai Ma. Vi. It was named after the locality of Gawai.

The institution provides education from nursery to Grade 12 and offers instruction in both Nepali and English.

== History ==
Secondary School Gawai was established to provide access to education for students in the Gawai area of Chitwan.

== Academics ==
The school offers classes from nursery to Grade 12 and follows the national curriculum prescribed by the Government of Nepal.

== Sports and extracurricular activities ==
The school participates in municipal-level competitions.

In 2023, it secured first place in the President Running Shield competition organized in Khairahani.

In 2025 (2082 B.S.), the school won the President Running Shield competition held in Khairahani Municipality, securing the title for the fourth time after previously winning it for three consecutive years. The school also won 17 gold, 9 silver, and 12 bronze medals in the competition.

== See also ==
- Education in Nepal
- List of schools in Nepal
