= Eden National Boarding School =

- ईडेन नेशनल बोर्डिङ स्कुल

Location
- Uday Marga Road, Oil Nigam East, Biratnagar 4, Morang

Information
- Type: Private school
- Motto: A Child Today May Lead The Nation Tomorrow
- Established: Poush 2nd, 2048B.S. (1991 A.D.)
- Founder: Mr. Phadindra Nath Sharma Kaphley and Mrs. Lily Sharma Kaphley
- Principal: Ashma Neupane
- Grades: 1-10
- Enrollment: 850+
- Affiliation: SLC Board; PABSON

Eden National Boarding School (Nepali:ईडेन नेशनल बोर्डिङ स्कुल) is a school located in Biratnagar, Nepal. It was established in 1991 (2048 B.S.) The school's first graduates were in 2000 (2056 B.S.) In 2010 (2066 B.S.), school went under new management. the founder is Mr Tulasi Pokharel.
