= Basu Higher Secondary School =

School in Bhaktapur, Nepal

Information
- Established: 1962; 63 years ago
- Website: www.basu.edu.np

Basu Higher Secondary School is a public school in Bhaktapur, Nepal.

== History ==
The school was established with primary level classes in 2019 BS (1962 CE). The first School Leaving Certificate (SLC) students were six in number, in 2044 BS (1987 CE). In 2063 SLC (2006 CE), a contingent of 244 students took SLC examinations.

== Curriculum ==
In the academic year 2061 (2004 CE), the school started 10+2 programs in Science and Management. Humanities were added in 2062 (2005 CE). The school extended its programs to include BBS (Bachelor of Business Studies) in 2066 (2009 AD).
