= Adarsha Vidya Mandir =

School in Lalitpur, Bagmati Zone, Nepal

Adarsha Vidya Mandir Higher Secondary School

Location
- Lalitpur, Bagmati Zone; Nepal
- Coordinates: 27.6674°N 85.3150°E

Information
- Type: Coeducational
- Motto: Be Good Do Good
- Established: 1966; 2022 B.S.
- Founder: Satya Narayan Bahadur Shrestha
- Principal: Sujeeta Manandhar
- Enrollment: 7000 approx
- Nickname: AVM
- Website: Adarsha Vidya Mandir

AVM Higher Secondary School is one of the oldest and largest schools in Nepal. It was established in 1966 in Manbhawan, Lalitpur, by educator Satya Narayan Bahadur Shrestha. It has won several awards for its excellent results in national level examinations held by the Higher Secondary Education Board of Nepal. In 2016, it celebrated its fifty year golden jubilee.

== History ==
The history of AVM High School is linked with the history of the late Satya Narayan Bahadur Shrestha, who is regarded by many as a selfless educationalist who spent his whole life in the field of education. With 120 students at a rented building known as Bhairab Bhavan (which was later acquired by the Himalaya Hotel at Kupondol, Lalitpur, Nepal), AVM High School has six modern buildings, three playgrounds, and two basketball courts. The school offers education from grade 1 to School Leaving Certificate level (equivalent to O levels offered by University of Cambridge).

AVM High School has also been conducting a 10+2 program since 2058 B.S., in the fields of Science and Management. AVM High School is semi-public school initiated by one of a guthi (community).

== Extracurricular activities ==
AVM is involved in cricket competitions and table tennis competitions. AVM also organizes a cricket tournament every year in the memory of the founder late SNB Shrestha.

Field trips are arranged, these include excursions the Botanical Garden, zoo, historical places, science experiments, and orphanage. An annual picnic is held during winter season.
