= Kanjirowa National School =

School in Kathmandu, Nepal

Coordinates: 27.67356°N 85.34343°E

Kanjirowa National Secondary School (KNSS)
- Kathmandu; Nepal

Information
- Type: Coeducational
- Established: 1998 (As Kathmandu Don Bosco High School); 2010 (Changed name to Kanjirowa National School)
- Principal: Ranjeet Thapa
- Website: www.kanjisl.edu.np

Kanjirowa National Secondary School is an independent, co-educational institution located at Koteshwor, Kathmandu, Nepal. It was founded as Kathmandu Don Bosco High School in 1998. The school provides classes from 1 to 10.

== See also ==
- List of schools in Nepal
