= Laligurans Batika Secondary School =

Laligurans Batika Secondary School (LGBS)
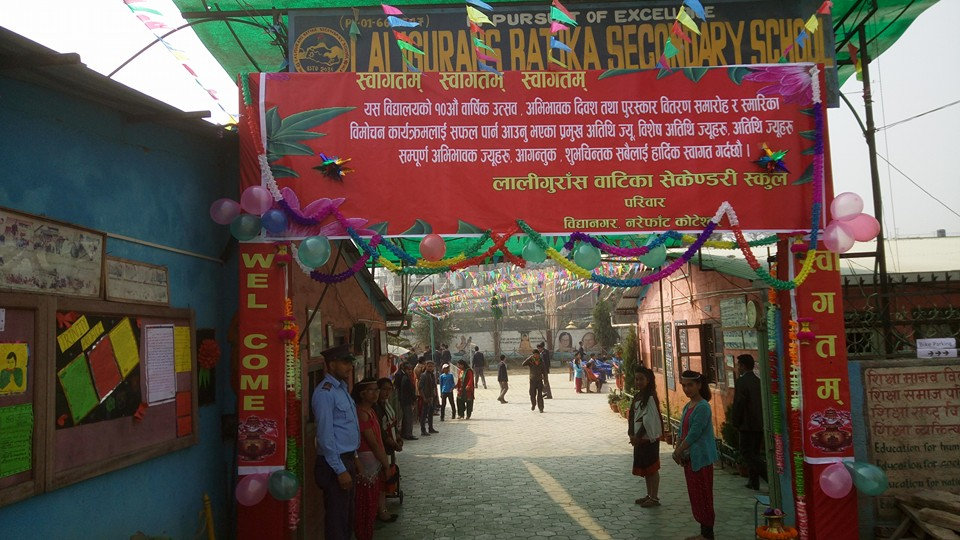

Location
- Kathmandu; Nepal

Information
- Type: Coeducational
- Established: 1979
- Director: Sudarshan Parajuli
- Principal: Hari Shiwakoti
- Website: www.lgbs.edu.np

Laligurans Batika Secondary School (LBSS previously LGBS) is a co-educational institution. It was established in 1979 A.D. It is located at Bidhyanagar, Narephant, Koteshwor, Kathmandu, Nepal. Laligurans Batika Secondary School provided classes from 1 to 10 until the academic session of 2017/18 where the institute started serving students up to grade 12.

== See also ==
- List of schools in Nepal
