= ALHEBS, Jaleshwar =

Advance Learners Himalayan English Boarding Secondary school
- Jaleshwar; Nepal

Information
- Type: Private school coeducational
- Motto: Quality Education for Quality Life
- Established: 1995
- Founder: Ram Ekwal Singh
- School district: Mahottari
- Enrollment: 750 approx
- Affiliations: CDC; Higher Secondary Education Board, Sano thimi Bhaktapur
- Information: +977044520101

Advance Learners Himalayan English Boarding Secondary School, often referred as "Advance" or "ALHEBS" School is a private school in Jaleshwar, Nepal.

== Overview ==
The School is an English Medium School, ultimately upgraded to 10+2 Commerce, Arts and Education. This school was founded by Mr. Ram Ekwal Singh in 1995. ALHEBS school has 3 branches, namely the lower-secondary, Secondary and Higher-secondary branches, and they are under different supervisions. Most of its affairs are controlled by the founder principal. The school is renowned locally because of its regular good results at the annual SLC examinations, thus has managed to maintain a distinctive place among the locals.
The School also provides Boarding facilities for its students and also runs local transportation services for the students from the outer parts of the Jaleshwar city.

== Academics ==
ALHEBS school operates two courses of study :

1. School Leaving Certificate level (a nationwide curriculum up to class 10 prescribed by the Department of Education of Nepal.
2. 10+2 level (Higher Secondary Education Board of Nepal, equivalent alternative to A-levels).

The school has had 16 successful batches of SLC graduates. But the college has not lived up to the performance levels of the School.

== Extra curricular activities ==
The school holds extra-curricular activities and training sessions for personality development, most of which include cricket matches, quite popular game in that part of the world, along with some indoor games. Singing and dancing are also a common activities and most of the dances are of local mithilanchal origin and local culture is also practiced.

== Affiliation with Lions Club ==
ALHEBS school has established a very belonging relationship with the Leo club of Nepal mainly due to the involvement of school's Sports teacher Mr.Ram Chabilla Mandal and the principal. Both of them are senior regional Lions Club members.
The students are also found actively participating in the events organized by the local leo clubs which mostly includes blood donation, and Volunteering camps.

== Student Quality Circle ==
Since its inception in Nepal, the SQC, Nepal has found an active member in ALHEBS school. It is an active member and the local monitoring body for the organization as a teacher serving as the regional officer for, SQC members in Nepal the organisation QUEST, Nepal
