= Shree Harikul Model Higher Secondary School =

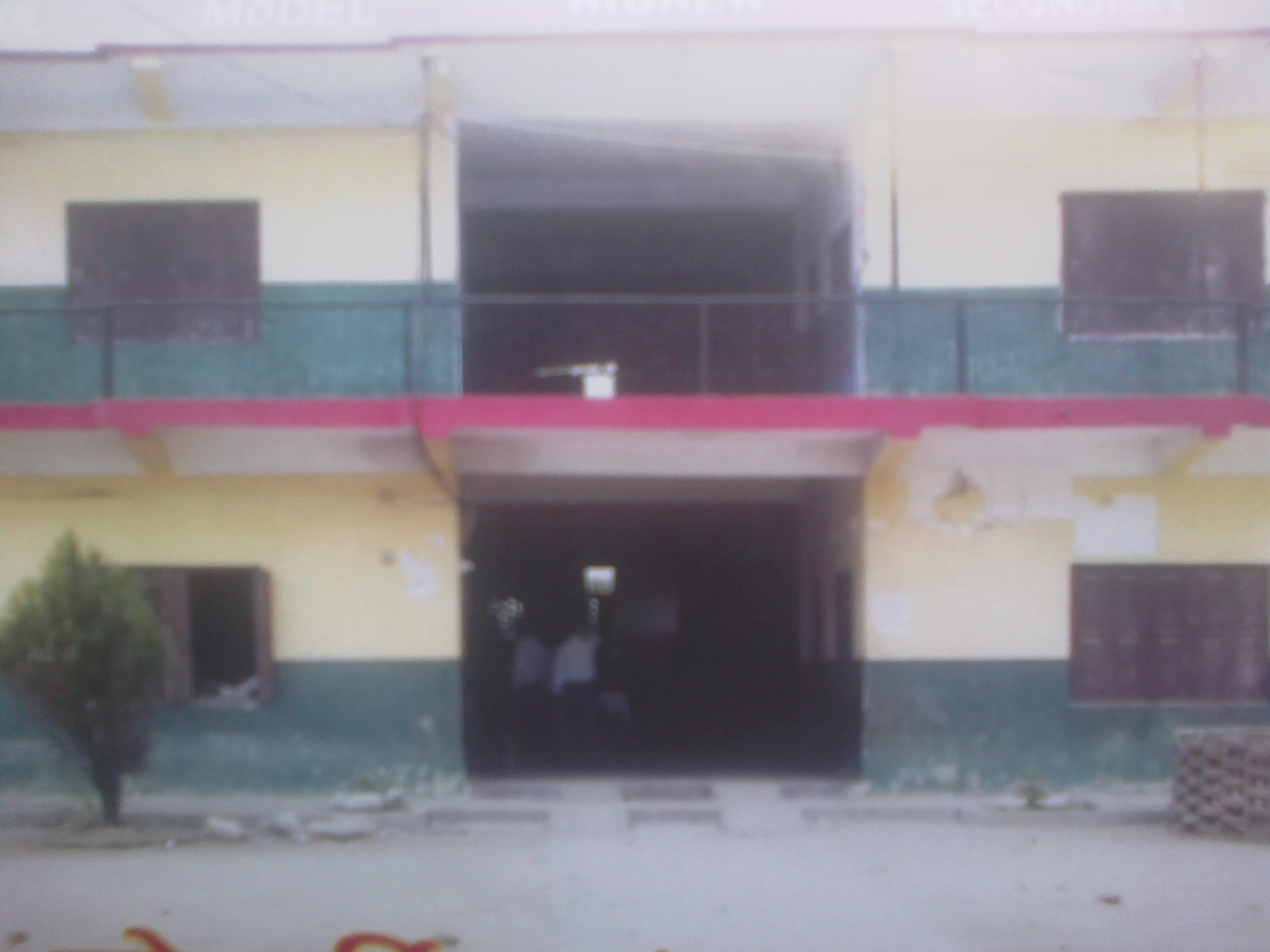
- Shree harikul main building

Location
- Mahendra Highway; Surunga; Nepal
- Coordinates: 26.645°N 87.893°E

Information
- Type: Private school
- Established: 6 February 1995
- Founder: Chandra Prasad Mainali
- School district: Jhapa
- Principal: Roshan K.C. Khatri
- Staff: 60+
- Faculty: Humanities, Management
- Enrollment: 1200(approx.)
- Colors: Green; Yellow; Blue; Red

Shree Harikul Model Higher Secondary School also called Shree Harikul in short is a privately owned secondary school in Kankai Municipality, Surunga, Jhapa District, Nepal, established in 1995. It is one of the oldest schools in the locality which has been running through the private sector and in English medium.

== History ==
The school was founded by Chandra Prasad Mainali following his retirement from the Government school Shree Kankai Secondary School, Surunga. The name of the school is derived from the names of Mainali's parents: mother Harimaya and father Kulprasad. The school management changed in 2020 as it was taken over by Dr. Grisha Rawal Thapa and Raju Thapa. The current Managing Director of Shree Harikul is Dr. Grisha Rawal, and the current principal is Mr. Roshan K.C. Khatri.

== Staff, Students and Facilities ==
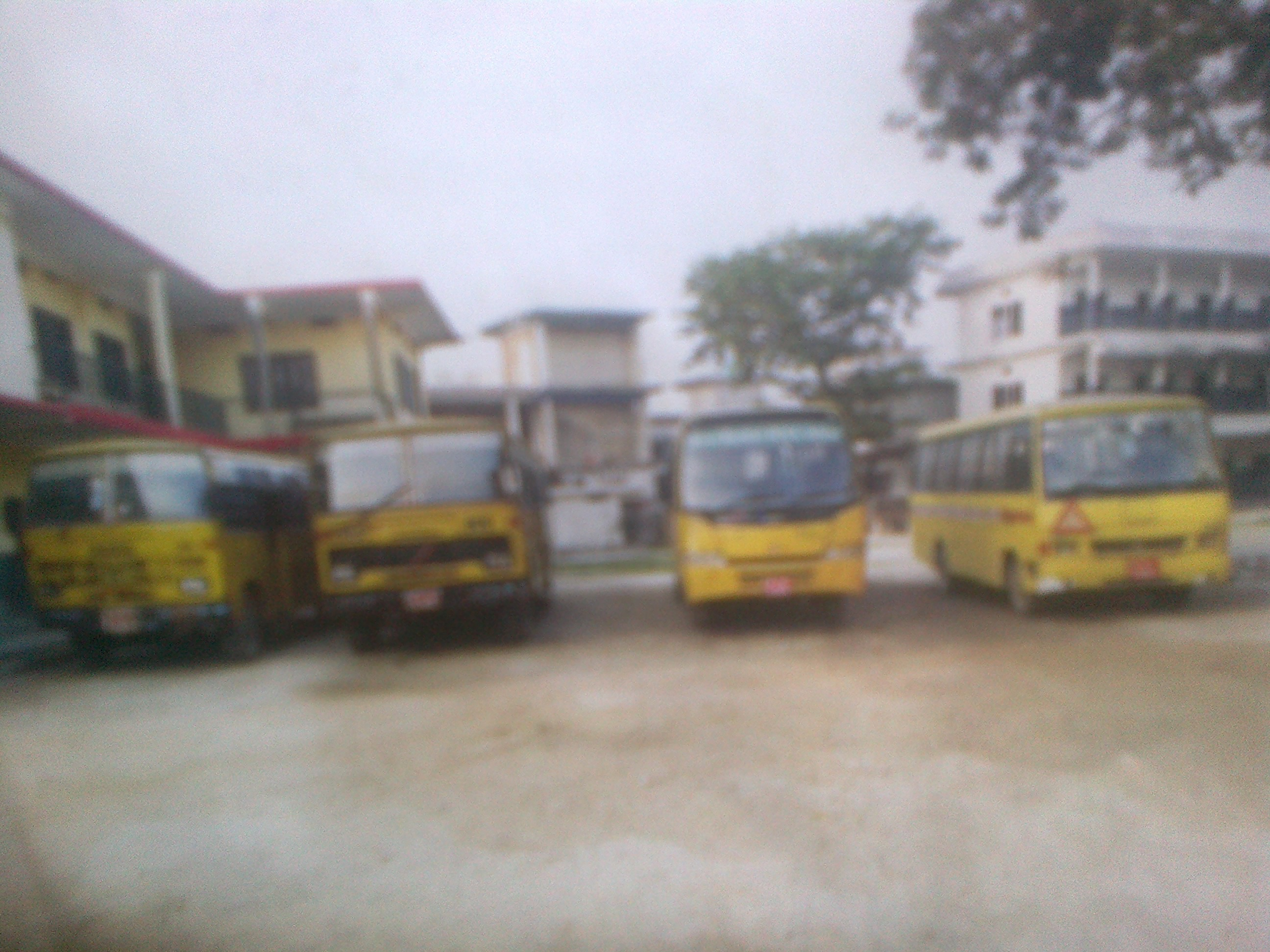
Buses at Shree harikul which carry Students

Shree Harikul has classes from Nursery to Grade 12. The +2 focuses on management faculty and offers subjects such as hotel management, business studies, and computer science. As of 2023, there are approximately 1200 students enrolled in this school. There are eight school vehicles that carry students from different places. Shree Harikul also gives various school, as well as donor scholarships to more than 100 students every year. The school has 100 staff members including, teachers, drivers, and other workers. Teachers are highly qualified for their respective teaching levels. Shree Harikul also provides several educational-related facilities to students. The premises include a full-size basketball court, volleyball court, futsal ground, library, science lab, mathematics lab, and two fully equipped computer labs. It is an English-medium school in Nepal.

== Events ==
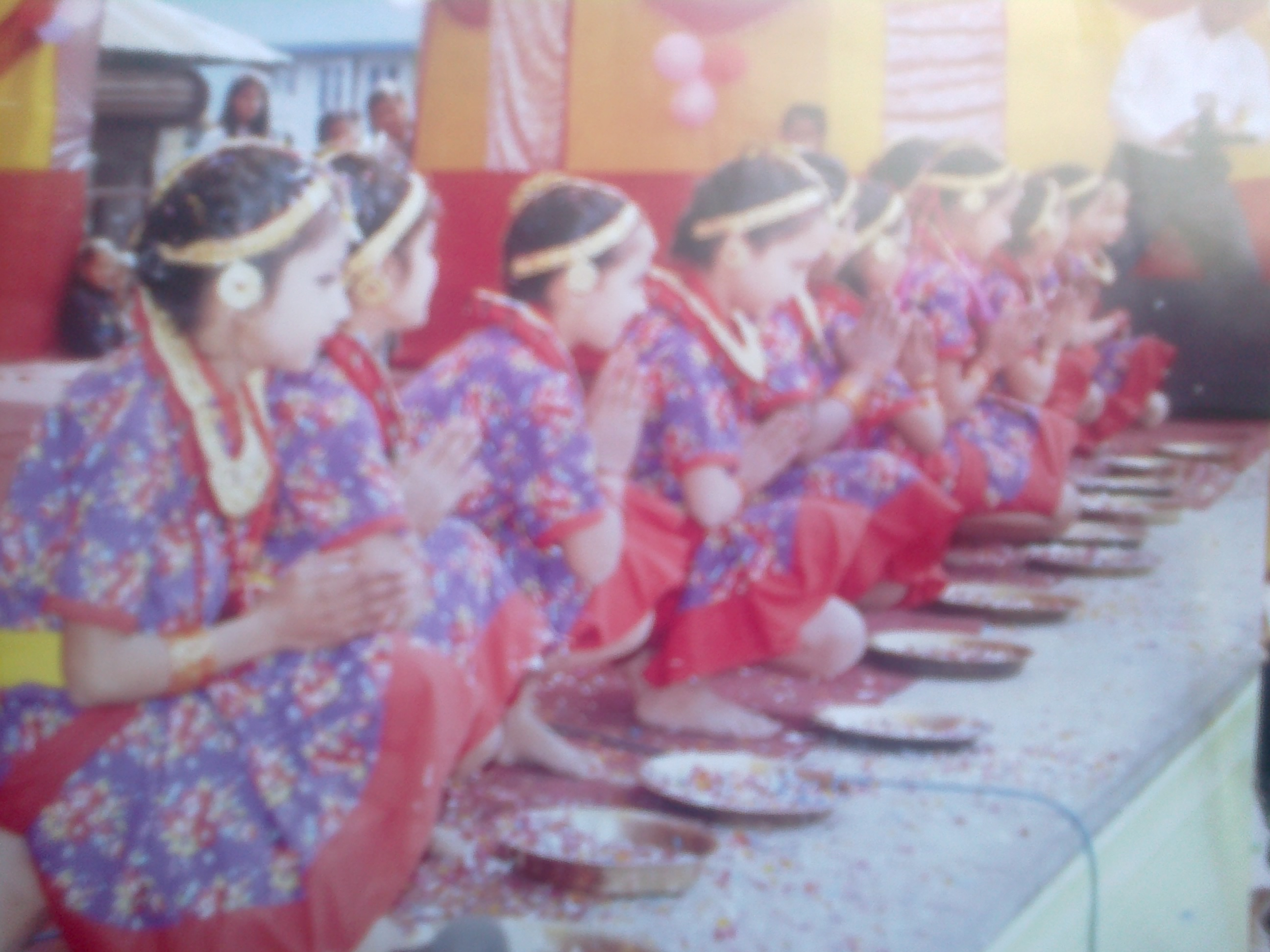
Students performing in annual function of shree harikul.

Shree Harikul hosts an annual function with different events celebrating the school's anniversary on 6 February, (23 Magh) each year. It also takes part in different cultural events organized by PABSON (an association of Nepalese Private Schools). Shree Harikul has won different prizes, which can be found in several online magazines. Every Friday is book-free day (initiated since 2020) where students participate in different extracurricular classes such as art, dance ( modern-traditional), drama, music, vocal and sports training for volleyball, cricket, football, table tennis, basketball, and karate. School Programmes are conducted every Friday as a part of extracurricular studies.

== See also ==
- List of schools in Nepal
