= Divya Jyoti Higher Secondary School =

Location
- Bardghat Municipality-2, Chisapani-5, Lumbini; Nepal
- 27.5551°N 83.7782°E

Information
- Type: Public
- Motto: Education for Development
- Established: 1977 (2034 B.S.)
- School district: Nawalparasi
- Authorizer: Ministry of Education, Nepal
- Chairperson: Sada Nanda Pandey (Past)
- Principal: Hom Nath Acharya
- Staff: 109
- Faculty: 00
- Enrollment: 1687 approx
- Color: Red Blue Yellow
- Nickname: DJHSS, Chisapani School
- Endowment: Nepalese Rupees 29 million
- Affiliations: SLC Board Nepal, Higher Secondary Board, HSEB Nepal,

Divya Jyoti Higher Secondary School is a public school located in the Nawalparasi district of Nepal.
