= Capital College and Research Centre =

Nepali secondary school in Kathmandu

Coordinates: 27.6729066970°N 85.343752333°E

- Balkumari, Kathmandu; Nepal

Information
- Type: Institutional(Private)
- Established: 2001
- School district: Kathmandu
- Principal: HC Lamichhane
- Grades: +2 Programs
- Gender: Male/Female
- Enrollment: Approximately 1800
- Language: English/Nepali
- Publication: CCRC Scroll
- Affiliation: Tribhuvan University(TU) and National Examinations Board(NEB)
- Website: ccrc.edu.np

The Capital College and Research Centre (CCRC) is a Nepali secondary school located in Balkumari, Kathmandu. CCRC was established in 2001 A.D. with a view to aid in the field of education. Since then, the school has been able to produce excellent results in both graduate and undergraduate levels. The college has also gained popularity in the field of sports. It has produced a decent cricket team. Additionally, basketball has highly aided to its sports success. CCRC college provides 15% percentage seat for students from Kathmandu metropolitan city's annual class 11 scholarship examination.

== Academics ==
CCRC offers grade 11 and 12 courses in science, humanities and management streams.

CCRC college has produced notable amount of IOE and IOM scholars overtime including IOE toppers Suman Tamang(2077 BS) and Nirajan Shah(2078 BS). The college has also proved to be a decent center for management faculty producing CA-2024(CAP I June 2024) topper Abhishek Dahal.

== Motto ==
The school's motto is Quest for knowledge with wisdom.

== See also ==
- Education in Nepal
- List of schools in Nepal
