= Udayapur Secondary English School =

- USEBS

Location
- Gaighat, Udayapur; Nepal
- Coordinates: 26.473703°N 86.42399°E

Information
- Motto: Education For Excellence
- Founded: 1994 AD (2051 BS)
- Founder: Kharananda Rizal
- School board: National PABSON
- School district: Udayapur
- Grades: Nursery to Grade 10.
- Enrollment: 800+
- Average class size: 30 per section; around 40/class
- Language: English
- Nickname: USEBS

Udayapur Secondary English School is a private school located in the Gaighat, Udayapur District of Nepal. The school offers education from Primary level up to the School Leaving Certificate (SLC). The school's motto is “Education For Excellence.”

== Overview ==
The school was established in 1994. It is a full private boarding school for students from pre-primary grade to the SEE. Almost all of its graduates go on to university.

== History ==
In 1994 the school was established by the founder and principal Mr. Kharananda S Rizal. Set up in a four-room house, it had classes up to grades 2. Later the school moved to Sangam Tole where it is now situated.

== Achievements ==
The school started to produce SLC students in 2001, with 11 students in the first batch. The previous 88.9% record was broken by a 92.57% which holds the highest rank in the district. This record was made by Navin Karki a student of this school right from the beginning. later the same record was made again by Lekhnath Pokharel, again the student right from the nursery classes. Some 360 students have graduated from the school till date, in the past eight batches of SLC exams. The Founder /Principal Of the school, Mr. Kharananda S Rizal was honoured with the national award as a social worker by Rastriya Sanskritik Mach, Nepal in 2066.

=== Sport ===
The school won the football trophy in 2003 in the district inter-school football tournament, and a trophy in 2004 in inter-school competitions.
