= Rajgadh =

Rajgadh राजगढ गाविस
- Location within Nepal
- Coordinates: 26°30′N 87°56′E
- Country: Nepal
- Zone: Mechi
- District: Jhapa

Population (2001)
  - Total: 15,354
- Time zone: UTC+05:45 (NPT)
- Postal code: 57209
- Area code: 23

Rajgadh (Nepali: राजगढ) is one of the villages in the southern part of the Jhapa district in Nepal. Its elevation range is 80–120 m above sea level. Some of its land area is covered with dense forest, known as the Charkose Jhadi. Its neighbouring VDCs are Chakchaki, Goldhhap, Sharanamati, Jalthal and Gherabari. It also borders India.

== History and culture ==
Rajgadh means "state of Rajbanshi", and was so named because it was the main residence of the Rajbanshi people; Rajbanshis still make up about half the population of Rajgadh. People from other groups such as Brahmin, Rai, and Limbu also live in Rajgadh. Rajgadh has several temples, including Shree Durga Mandir, Krishna Temple, Shiv Mandir, and Shree Dangi Laxmisthan.

== Economy ==
Farming is the main occupation for residents of Rajgadh, providing about 80% of their income source. The majority of farming is done traditionally, although some farmers have adopted more modern techniques. Remittance is also a major source of income.

The main economical center of Rajgadh is Rajgadh Bazzar, which hosts most of the activities related to trade. Janta Bazzar and Bhagdubba Bazzar are other small trade centers of Rajgadh.

== Education ==
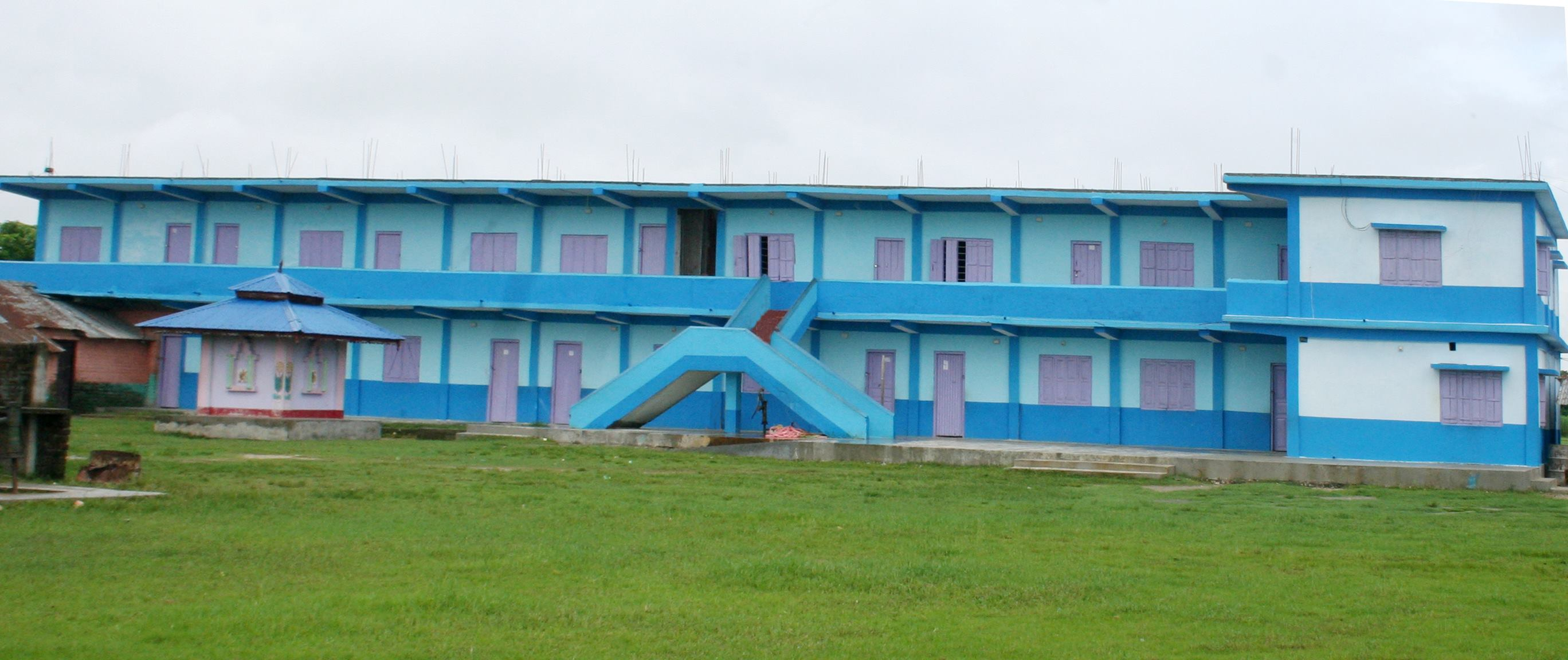
Gyan Jyoti Higher Secondary School

Rajgadh's literacy rate is average, compared to other VDCs. Pashupati Higher Secondary School is the only higher secondary level government school in Rajgadh. Gyanjyoti Higher Secondary School is another higher secondary school opened from the private sector. Other educational institutions include Little Star English School, Divyajyoti Secondary School, Sundarpur Primary School, Janta Primary School and Vagwati Pre-secondary School.

== Transportation and communication ==
Transportation in Rajgadh is mostly by bus, connecting with cities such as Birtamod, Chandragadi, Bhadrapur, Damak, and Biratnagar. Most roads are gravelled, but the main route is blacktopped. Almost 85% of families have mobile phones, and Wi-Fi is available.
