= Manakamana Higher Secondary School =

Manakamana Secondary School
- मनकामना माध्यमिक विद्यालय

Location
- Jorpati, Kathmandu; Kathmandu, Bagmati Zone; Nepal

Information
- Type: Co-educational
- Motto: Education for Creativity and Humanity
- Established: 1981
- School district: Kathmandu District
- Administrator: Janaranjan Devkota
- Director: Jagannath Devkota
- Principal: Bhawani Pd. Poudel
- Headmaster: Ram Chandra Devkota
- Staff: About 100
- Song: Aama Buba Bhannu hunchha
- Nickname: MHSS
- Affiliations: S.L.C Board (Secondary) and HSEB (+2)
- Information: +97714911188
- Website: www.manakamana.meroschool.com

Manakamana Secondary School is a school located in Jorpati, Kathmandu, the capital of Nepal. The school have classes from Play Group to +2. This school is fully fledged Co-educational institution. This school is registered under Ministry Of Education and has secured S.L.C Board's position. This school provides extra curricular activities. The school's motto is "Education for creativity and humanity". This school provides education to more than 1000 students. Manakamana is one of the highly ranked school in Gokarneshwar Municipality.

== History ==
It was established in 1981 AD (2038 BS). This school was founded by Mr. Jagannath Devkota. He is the founder director of school. His son Mr. Janan Devkota is the administrator of the school. The head master of this school is Mr. Ram Chandra Devkota. This school employs 50+ teachers. Environmentalist Mr. Nipesh DHAKA also taught as a Maths teacher in 2004–2005.
