= Siddhartha Boarding Secondary School =

School in Nepal

- SBHSS Logo

Location
- Damak-7, Jhapa, Nepal

Information
- Type: Private institution
- Motto: तमसोमा ज्योतिर्गमय
- Established: 1978
- Chairman: Tej Kumar Shrestha
- Grades: Nursery to 12
- Enrollment: 1500 (School level) and 1000 and above (Collegers) approx
- Accountant: Ekraj Shrestha
- Website: https://msiddhartha.edu.np/

Siddhartha Boarding Higher Secondary School is a private boarding school in Damak, Jhapa, Nepal. It was founded in 1978 by Tej kumar Shrestha.

== Academic programs ==
The school provides school leaving certificate programs in the field of science and management (including hotel management). The school used to provide Bachelor of Business Studies (BBS) program. However, currently they've been focused on montessori to high school(12th grade).
