= Shree Kitini (10+2) Higher Secondary School =

Government school in Nepal

Information
- Established: 1947; 78 years ago

Shree Kitini (10+2) Higher School located in the Lalitpur district of Nepal. The school was established in 2004 B.S. (1947 A.D.) at the palace in Taukhel. It is a government school.

== See also ==
- List of schools in Nepal
