= Rambhakta Memorial School =

Rambhakta Memorial School (RMS) is a school in Banepa-8, Kavrepalanchok District in Nepal. It was founded in 2005 in memory of late Rambhakta Kokh Shrestha. It is a coeducational school, with a pre-school through Grade 10 program. The school currently enrolls approximately 1100 students with around 70 staff members. This school has one of the best educational facilities in Kavre district with an international education system that has been adopted by Nepal's top schools. Currently Santosh Kokh Shrestha (Chairman) and Suman Kokh Shrestha (Principal), sons of Rambhakta Kokh Shrestha are running the school.
