= Nepal Armed Police Force School =

Nepal Armed Police Force School was established in 2006 and is run by Armed Police Force (Nepal). It is located at Champadevi of Kirtipur, Nepal. The school has over 21% of female students. The school is run as a non-profit organization and funded by the Armed Police Force Welfare Fund. The curriculum in the school is in English. The school serves the children of APF personnel and civilians. It offers classes from Grade 4 to high school (10+2).
