= Kathmandu National School =

Information
- Established: 1980; 45 years ago

Kathmandu National School.
