= Paramount Public School =

Paramount Public School was established in 2055 B.S. by Shreeman Gurung. It is located at Ramghat 10, Pokhara. It is a secondary level school. It has 2 buildings.

In the census year 2071 B.S total number of students were about 650 and teachers about 35. It was awarded by British Council an International School Award 2012-2015 A.D. In the year 2071 B.S. all the students passed SLC (School Leaving Certificate) in first division. Its motto is "Make good citizen for better world". It involves in extra-curriculum activities. After every two years it organises an exhibition which helps students on practical knowledge. It also organises cultural parents day every two years which focuses on Nepalese culture. It organises annual sports day which focuses on physical strength of students. It also organises extra extracurricular activities every week..
