= Singha Bahini Higher Secondary School =

- सिंहवाहिनी उच्च माध्यमिक विद्यालय
- Myanglung-2, Terhathum; Nepal

Information
- School district: Terhathum
- Headmaster: Tej Bahadur Karki
- Staff: over 25
- Enrollment: 300 in 2014 including all levels
- Color: white
- Affiliations: Higher Secondary Education Board

Singha Bahini Higher Secondary School (Nepali: सिंहवाहिनी उच्च माध्यमिक विद्यालय) is a public school situated at Myanglung-2, Terhathum in eastern Nepal. It is affiliated under Higher Secondary Education Board.

== Faculty ==
It offers education in just 3 faculties i.e. Management, Arts and Education. It has a capacity of receiving more than 300 students in all shifts. The studies of +2 level is just in morning shifts and during day, the secondary level students are taught.
