= Navjyoti English School =

- Navjyoti English School

Location
- Mahadev Chowk, Dharan-15; Dharan, Koshi; Nepal

Information
- Type: Private school
- Motto: "For God and Country" Service before self.
- Religious affiliation: Catholic
- Established: 1988
- School district: sunsari
- Principal: Sister Alice
- Gender: Coeducational
- Age range: 6 to 19
- Enrollment: 2000+
- Houses: Blue, Yellow, Green, Red
- Colors: Blue, red, yellow and green
- Publication: (SchoolMagazine)
- Website: http://www.navjyotis.edu.np

Navjyoti School was established in 1988. It is a Catholic School under the management of the Sisters of Charity of Nazareth, an international congregation, committed to work for justice in solidarity with oppressed peoples, especially the economically poor and women, and to care for the Earth. This aim is realized through education, health services, social action, and social services. The school is recognized by the Government of Nepal. It is owned and operated by Nepal Nazareth Society.

== Years in schools ==
- Year 0: Junior Kindergarten (JKG)
- Year 1: Senior Kindergarten (SKG)
- Year 2: Class I
- Year 3: Class II
- Year 4: Class III
- Year 5: Class IV
- Year 6: Class V
- Year 7: Class VI
- Year 8: Class VII
- Year 9: Class IIX
- Year 10: Class IX
- Year 11: Class X

== Library ==
The library provides study areas and housing for a collection of nearly 8000 books along with audiovisual materials. It has textbooks, journals, reference books, newspapers, and magazines. The school provides audiovisual facilities to the primary students. Each class visits the library twice a week.

== Laboratories ==
The school has laboratories for Physics, Chemistry, Biology, and Computer Science.

== Transport ==
The school has two yellow and silver school buses and one red jeep.

== Sports ==
The school has football and basketball teams. Other facilities include cricket, table tennis, volleyball, karate, kung fu, badminton and tae kwon do.
