= Janapriya Higher Secondary School =

Janapriya Secondary School

Location
- Chisapani, Hatiya, Hetauda Ward No. 16; Nepal; 27.3818°N 85.0798°E

Information
- Established: 1976free
- School district: Makwanpur
- Affiliation: Nepal Education Board; Higher Secondary Education Board; Tribhuvan University; CTEVT
- Website: www.janapriyahetauda.edu.np

Janapriya Secondary School, formerly Janapriya Secondary School (Technical institute) is a community-run non-profit Technical Institute in Hetauda, Nepal, known for its technical program in veterinary and agriculture, which is referred to, independently, as Janapriya Technical Institute.

== Introduction ==
The institute is located in Ward No. 16 of Hetauda Submetropolis, in Chisapani, Hatiya (formerly Hatiya VDC), about 6 km east of Hetauda proper. As of 2024, the principal is Bhupendra Chaulagain, while Ramesh Khatiwada was the chairperson of the Management Committee.

== History ==
Janapriya School started in 2033 BS, and lower secondary level education was formally started in 2034 BS. In 2052 BS, secondary level classes were formally started with the approval from District Education Office, Makwanpur. In 2062 BS, it started running agriculture and veterinary (technical) program affiliated with CTEVT. It became a higher secondary school in 2063 BS when it was approved for 10+2 level by the Higher Secondary Education Board. It also runs bachelor level classes under affiliation of Tribhuvan University.

It is also most popular for Its Agriculture and Veterinary farm, which is located inside the Technical Institute Building. It has been run under the supervision of Agriculture Graduates for all the agriculture and livestock related activities run inside the Farm.

== Public school ==
Janapriya Secondary School was one of the first fourteen schools to be selected in the first phase of the Model Public School Programme of the Government of Nepal, which plans to develop 240 schools in the country into model schools with earth-quake resistant buildings and complete infrastructure including laboratories, libraries, hostels, sports facilities, drinking water and sanitation, etc. According to the Chair of School Management Committee, Loknath Chaulagain, the school has received a grant of Rs 120 Million from the Government of Nepal for its infrastructure development, under the model public schools programme. The grant was being used to build classrooms, laboratories, a conference room and student hostel buildings, As of 2018. On 14 September 2019, the newly constructed building for its technical school was inaugurated by Minister of Education, Science and Technology, Giriraj Mani Pokharel. According to Aarthik Abhiyan, the total cost of the newly completed infrastructure handed over to the community amounted to Rs 102.5 Million. According to Thaha Khabar, Janapriya School is being developed into a model public school by the assistance of Asian Development Bank.

== Janapriya Technical institute ==
Janapriya Secondary School started its technical program in 2061 BS. The technical Institute provides 18 month diploma courses in veterinary and agriculture (JTA). The program takes admissions from secondary level students who fail to acquire their SEE diplomas, providing them with a second chance for education and skilled employment. According to principal Namaraj Aryal, more than 2,000 agricultural technicians had successfully graduated from the technical institute As of 2018. There were 400 students from 38 districts enrolled in the institute as of that year. The school runs agricultural and livestock farms to provide practical work to its students, they sell their produces to the local market. Due to high application rates, the institutes conducts entrance examinations.

== See also ==
- Education in Nepal
