= Nawayug Academy Higher Secondary School =

- Inaruwa, Sunsari District; Nepal

Nawayug Academy Higher Secondary School is a secondary school in Inaruwa, Sunsari District, Nepal. Nawayug Academy was established on Poush 6, 2064 B.S(December 21, 2007 A.D).
