= Jana Adarsha Multiple Campus =

- जन आदर्श बहुमुखी क्याम्पस
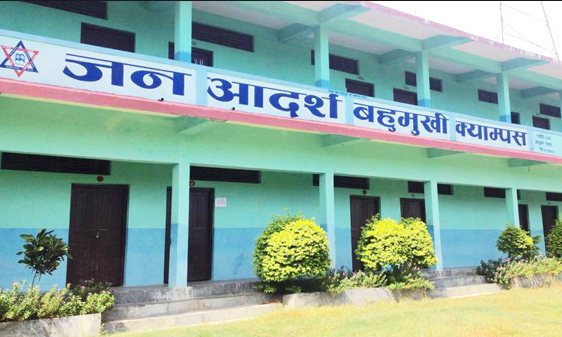
- Type: Public Campus
- Established: 2050 B. S.
- Affiliations: HSEB, TU
- Principal: Dhruba Prasad Adhikari
- Students: 1000
- Location: Rapti Municipality, Chitwan, Nepal
- Language: English Nepali
- Website: http://jamc.edu.np/
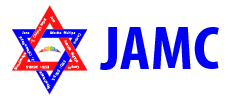

Jana Adarsha Multiple Campus (Nepali: जन आदर्श बहुमुखी क्याम्पस) is an institution of higher learning located in Rapti Municipality, Chitwan, Nepal. It was established in 2050 B. S. as non-profit seeking public campus governed and managed by local people and one of the leading community campuses in Chitwan.

Campus provides +2 programs in the field of Management, Education and Arts with the affiliation of Higher Secondary Education Board of Nepal and undergraduate program in the field of Management and Education, postgraduate programs in the fields of Management with the affiliation of Tribhuvan University. There are about 1000 students in the campus.
