= Triveni Baljagat English School =

School in Nepal

Tribeni Baljagat English Secondary Boarding School
- Ramailo, Koshi; Nepal

Information
- Type: Private
- Established: 2052 B.S.
- School district: Morang
- Authorizer: Ministry of Education, Nepal
- Principal: Tara Bahauder Kafle
- Staff: 27
- Enrollment: 600 approx
- Color: Green Blue
- Nickname: Tribeni
- Endowment: Nepalese Rupees29 million
- Affiliations: PABSON
- Website: Under Construction

Tribeni Baljagat is a private school in Bayarban VDC - 7 Ramailo Morang.
