= SOS Hermann Gmeiner Higher Secondary School =

Nepalese educational institution

Information
- Established: 1982; 44 years ago
- Enrollment: 781

SOS Hermann Gmeiner Secondary School, Gandaki, established in 1982 as a Day Care center, is one of the two SOS Hermann Gmeiner schools located in Pokhara, alongside SOS Hermann Gmeiner Secondary School, Pokhara in Rambazzar. It was inaugurated on 6 June 1987. The school runs classes from Nursery to Higher Secondary. It also provides various scholarships to the children of the local community. The school is providing Higher Education in the science stream. There are 781 students, out of which 644 students come from the local community. It is under SOS Kinderdorf International, a not-for-profit organisation.
