= Bishwo Shanti Higher Secondary School =

School in Pokhara, Nepal

Information
- Established: 1954; 71 years ago

The Bishwo Shanti Higher Secondary School is situated in the Deurali V.D.C. of Kaski, Nepal. This is located on the eastern side of Kaski district. It was established in 1954 (2011 B.S.) having the name Rastriya Pra. Bi.(National Primary School) and later it was renamed as Bishwa Shanti Ma. Vi. on 2022 B.S.
