= Shree Radha Damodar Gyan Jyoti Higher Secondary School =

Radhadamodar Higher Secondary School
- राधा दामोदर उच्च माध्यमिक विध्यालय
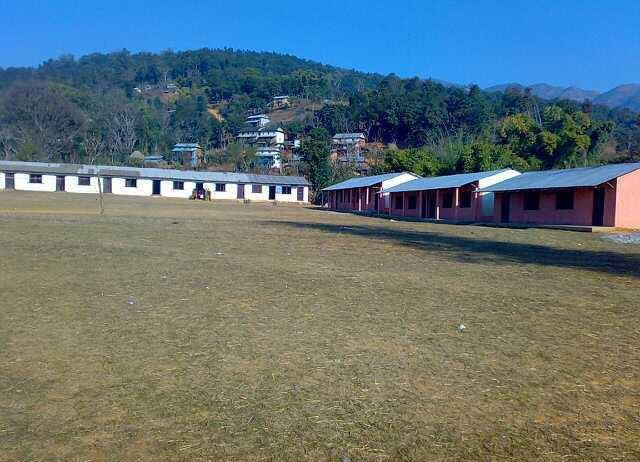

Location
- Sankhar; Syangja; Nepal
- Coordinates: 27.881286°N 83.925475°E

Information
- School type: High school
- Established: 1982
- Status: Open
- School board: HSEB
- School district: Syangja District
- Principal: Ananta Raj Gaihre

Radhadamodar Higher Secondary School(formerly) Radhadamodar Sanskrit Vidyapeeth is a government higher secondary school (10+2) located at Rimaldihi at the northern end of Sankhar VDC. It provides all-round education to about 500 students, classes 1–12. Of this number 45% are girls, 55% are boys. It is the first Sanskrit school affiliated by Nepal Sanskrit University in Syangja District.

== Facilities and activities ==
=== Sports facilities ===
- Gymnasium (volleyball, basketball, indoor football, badminton, softball)

=== Science laboratories ===
The science laboratories are for the science courses throughout classes 4 to 12. Each class have science practical classes in the science labs. In addition to the science teachers, the science department has three lab assistants who maintain all the science apparatus and science facilities.

=== Health center ===
The health center takes care of minor illnesses and first aid services. Serious cases are referred to the nearby bigger hospitals. A CMA counselor and a nurse remain in charge of the health center and of the health education classes.

=== Other activities ===
- GBS level basketball, football and cricket tournaments (annual)
- Football, volleyball, and basketball competitions with outside teams.
- Taking part in outside tournaments in football, essay writing, general knowledge, speech contest, essay writing competition, spelling contest, etc.
