= Laboratory School (Nepal) =

- Lab School
- Kirtipur; Kathmandu, Nepal, Bagmati

Information
- School type: Higher secondary
- School board: SEE, HSEB +2
- Principal Lakpa: Dr. Lakpa Sherpa
- Gender: All gender.
- Age range: 4 to 19
- Average class size: Big, Medium.
- Student to teacher ratio: 40:1
- Language: English, Nepali many more
- Hours in school day: 7 to 8
- National ranking: 1. 30th
- Test average: 90%

Laboratory School, often referred to as Lab School was established in 1956 with support from U.S. and government of Nepal. It is located in Kirtipur, Kathmandu. Currently the School is run under the Laboratory Secondary School public Trust. There is a good number of students and teachers with beautiful environment. There is a facility of Computer, Science, Maths and Language labs.

== Overview ==
The school follows the curriculum prescribed by the Curriculum Development Centre of Nepal. Besides compulsory subjects a wide choice of subject is offered for the students assignments. The school also has special facilities for visually impaired students.

== Gallery ==
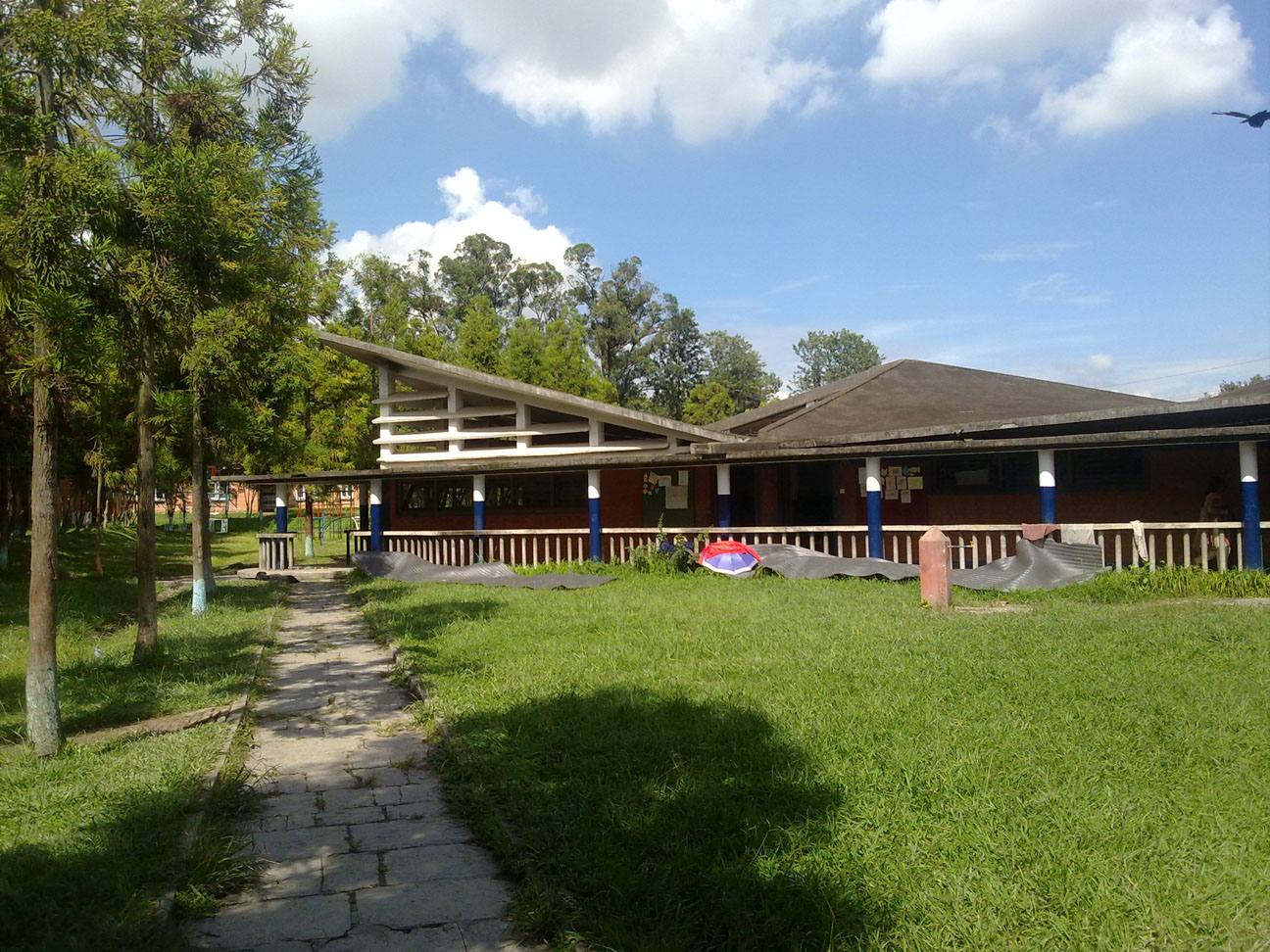
School Lawn

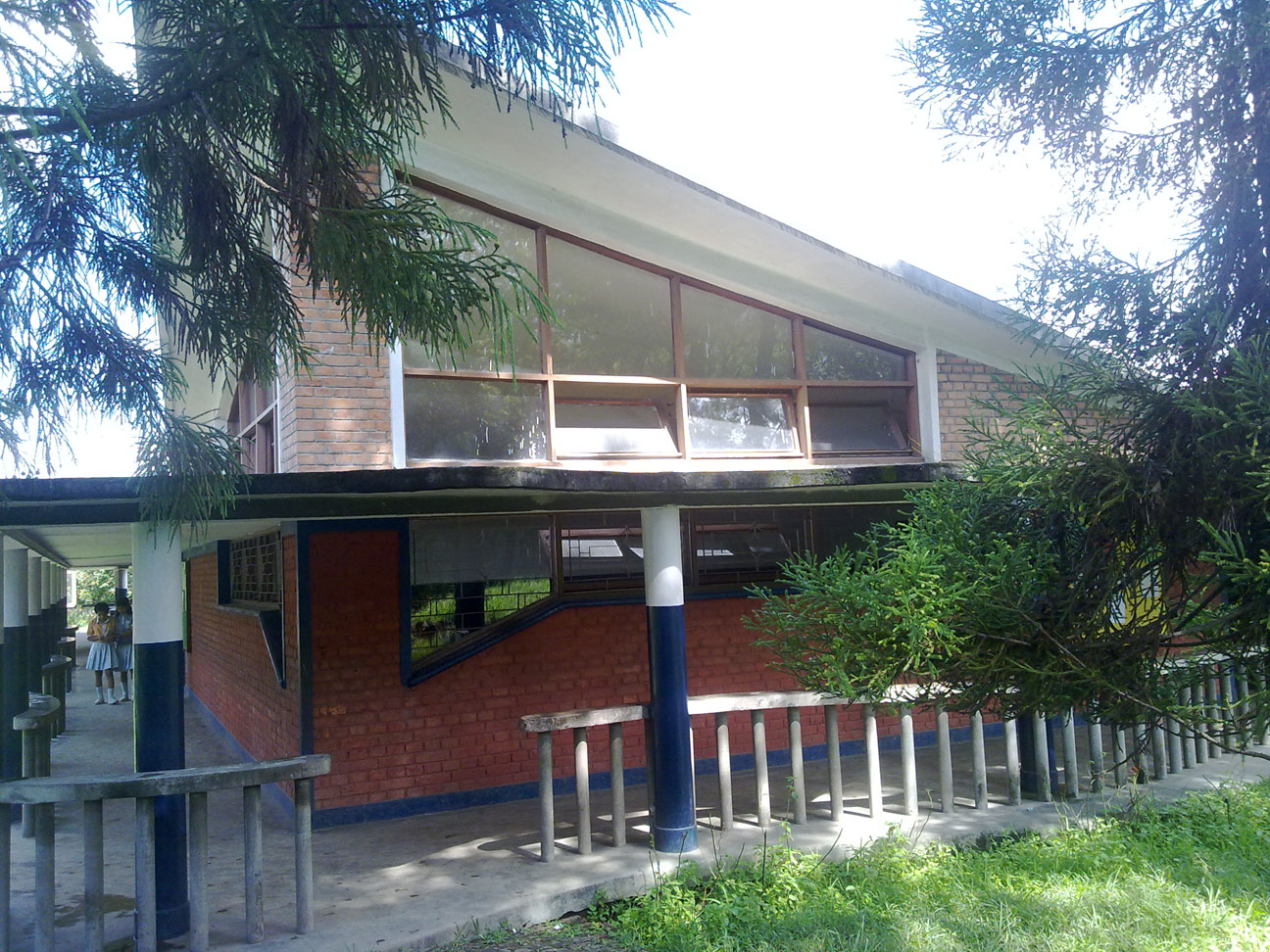
Classroom Exterior

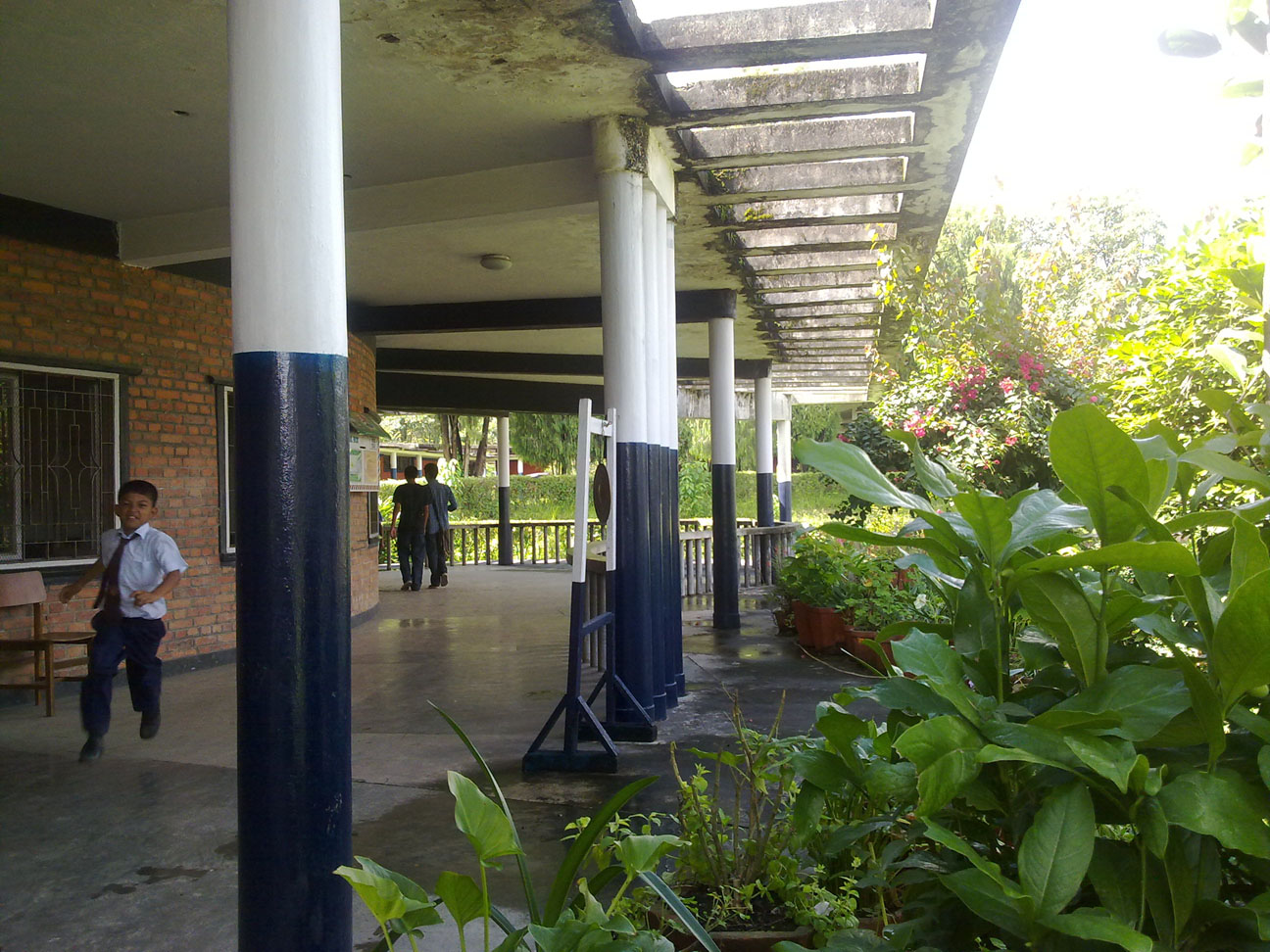
Interesting curvy corridors with green surroundings of Laboratory School
