= Parvat Secondary Boarding School =

Coordinates: 26.8046°N 87.2774°E

Location
- Dipendra Chowk; Dharan, Koshi; Nepal

Information
- Type: Private school
- Established: April 29, 1985; 41 years ago
- School district: Sunsari
- Director: Mr Dil Kumar Subba
- Principal: Mrs Vishma Chemjong
- Enrollment: 500+
- Houses: Blue, yellow, green, red
- Colors: Blue, Red, Yellow and Green
- Publication: Muna
- Website: psbs.com.np

Parvat Secondary Boarding School (PSBS) is a multi-racial secondary school in Dharan in the eastern part of Nepal. PSBS was the first private school established in Dipendra Chowk district. The medium of instruction is English, with Nepali as an extra subject. Students study science, economics or tourism after Grade 9.
