= Bal Mandir =

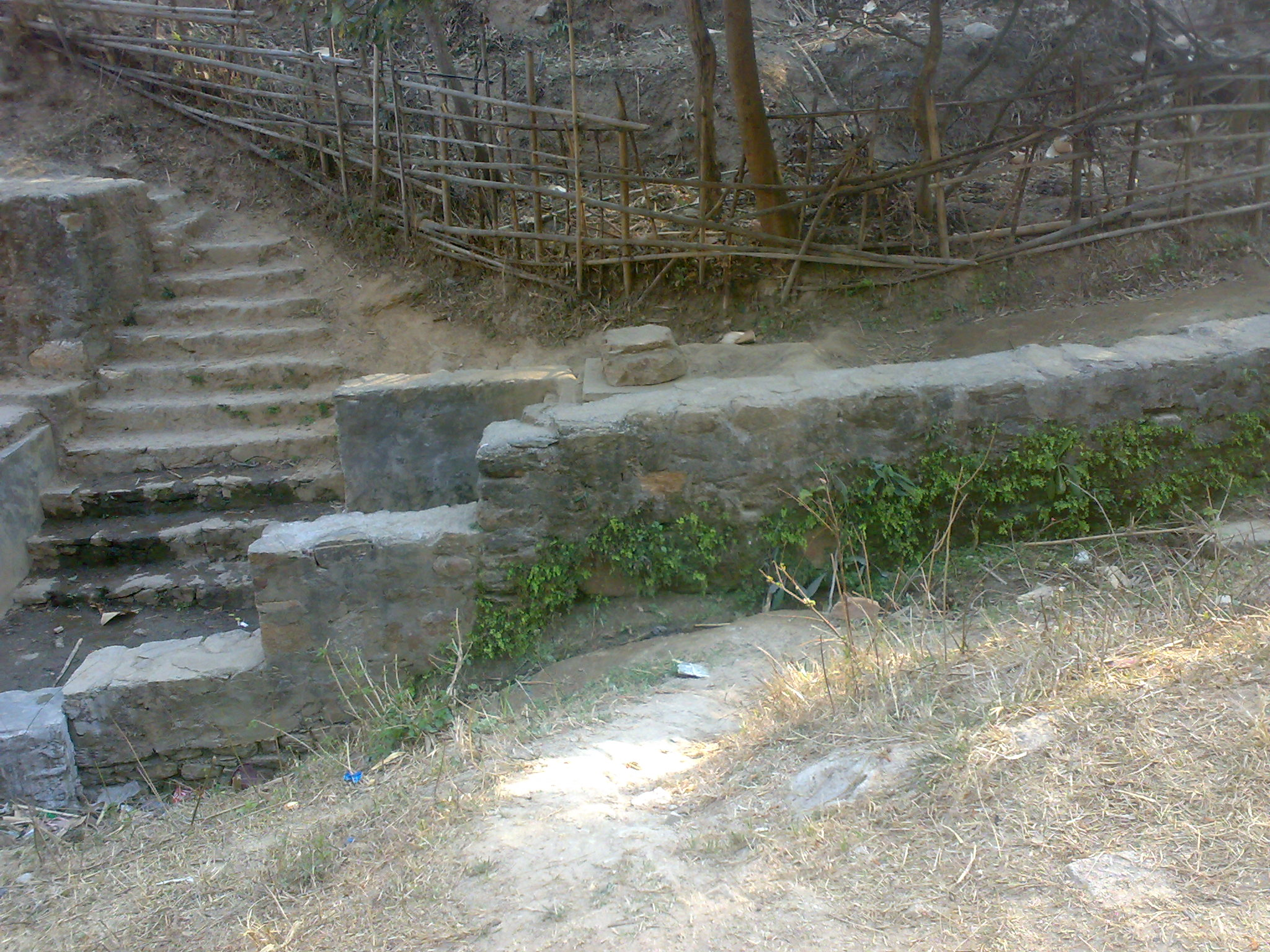
Kuwa

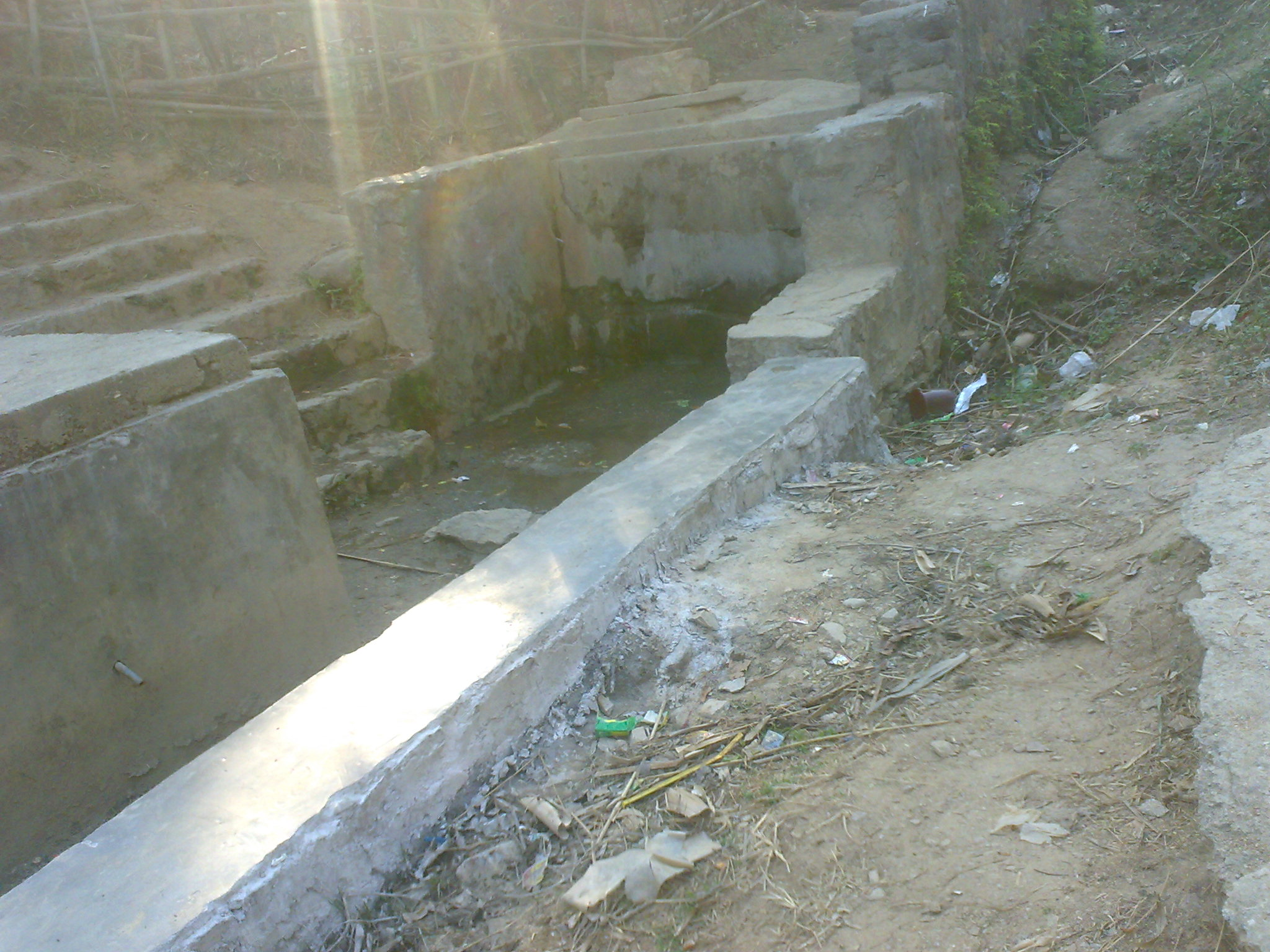

Balmandir is a small village in the Dhankuta District of Nepal, in Ward Number 5. Dhankuta is also the capital of Eastern Development Region of Nepal. It is a rural village in a remote area. Most of the people here are of mixed cultures who have moved there from various parts of Nepal.

There are various agricultural products which are cultivated in the area, including crops like maize, tomato, and others. There is a pond which is shown in the picture. It is a great source of drinking water for the people living here. It is maintained by various clubs and offices to protect the existence of water.

The students of these areas have to walk nearly 1 and a half hour to reach school because there are no schools in this area.

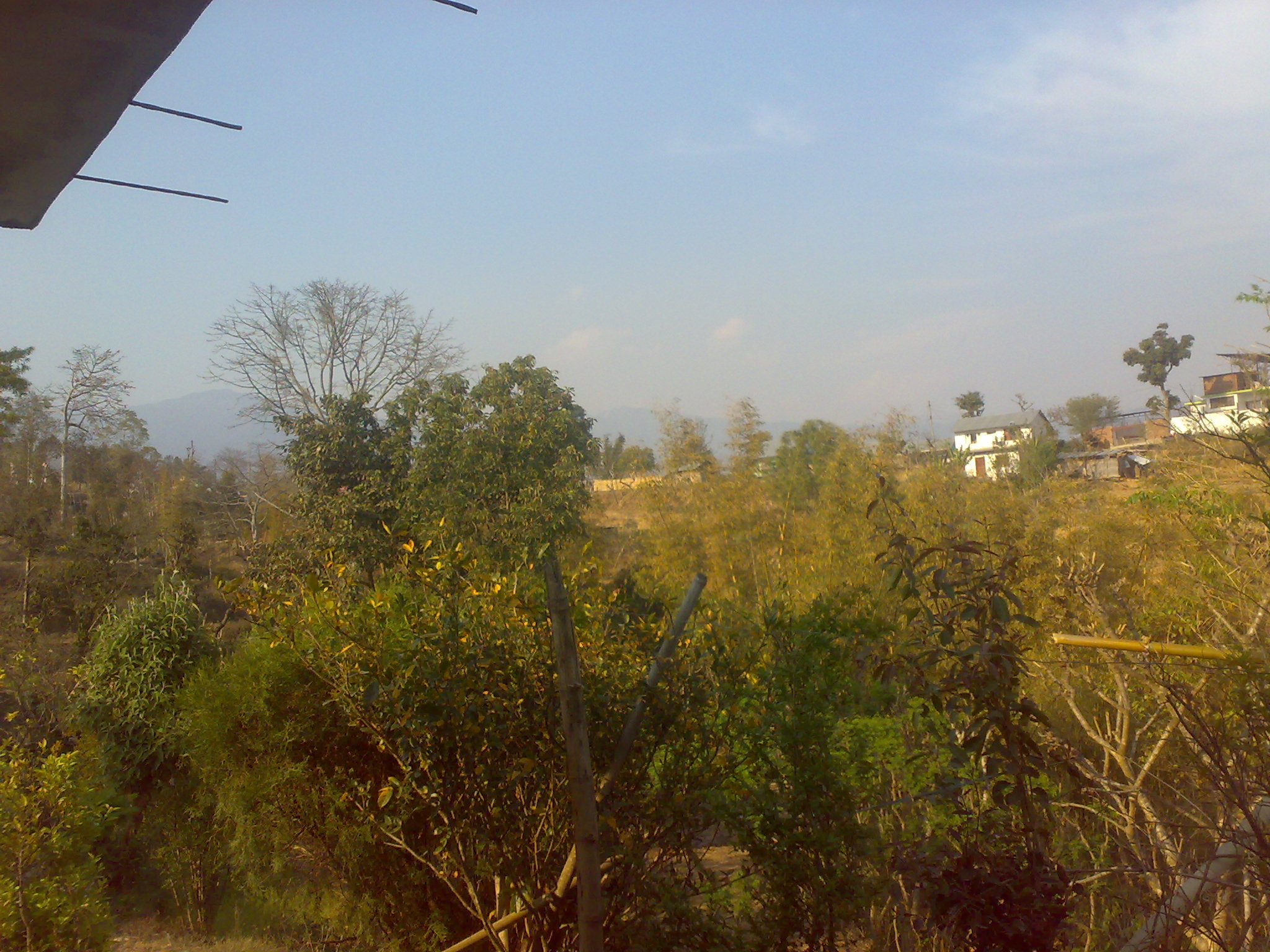
Dewantar

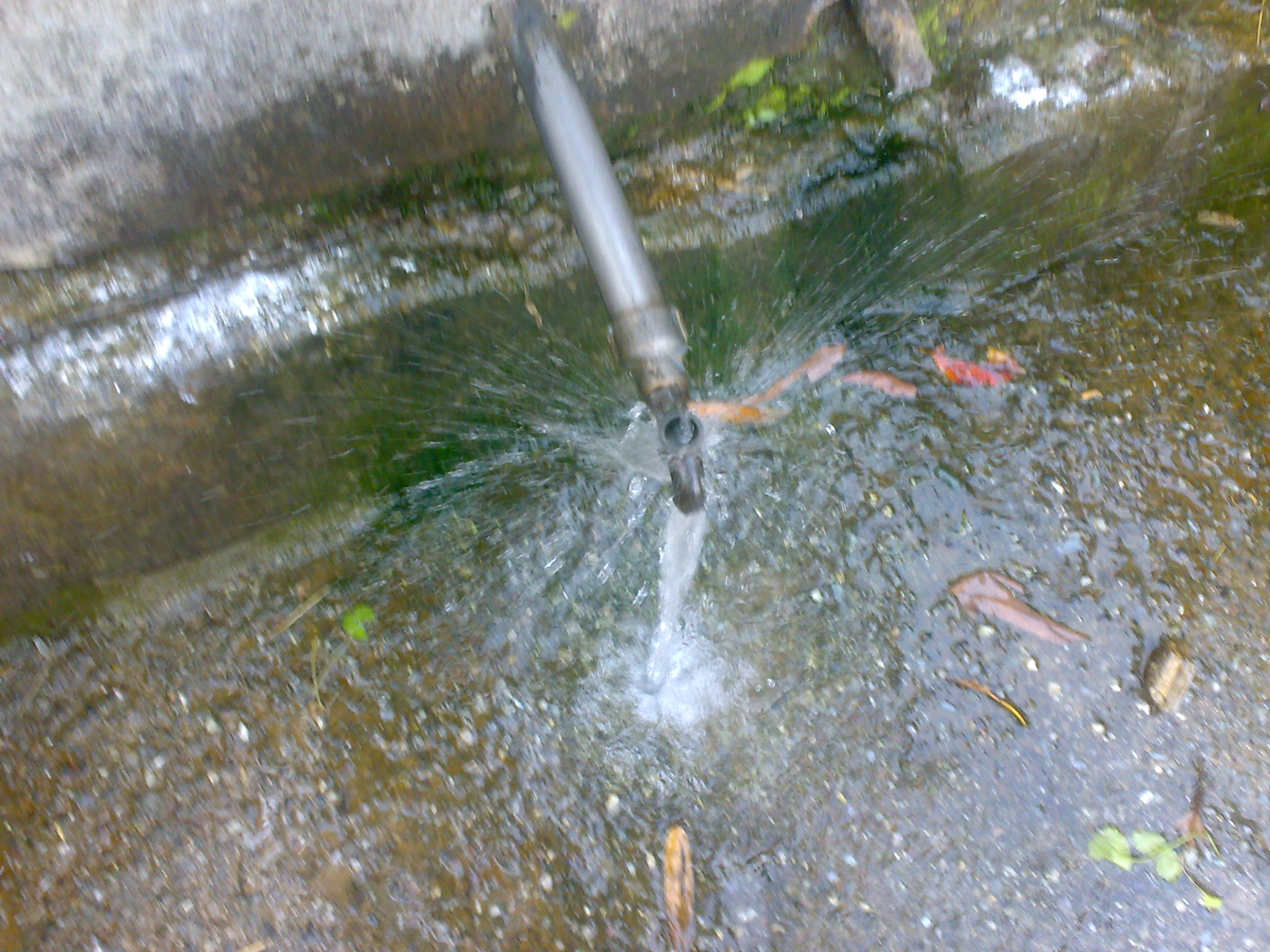
