= Jante Higher Secondary School =

- J.H.S.S.

Location
- Jante; Nepal, Nepal; Nepal
- Coordinates: 26.76063°N 87.54902°E

Information
- School type: public public
- Established: 1976 AD
- Founder: Gyan Bahadur Chemjong Limbu, Hansa Bahadur Rai and Ganesh Kumari Chemjong Limbu
- Status: Active
- School district: Morang
- Headmaster: Uttam Raj Khatiwada
- Classes: Class 1 to 12
- Campus type: public

Jante Higher Secondary School is the public school of Jante-2, Morang District of Nepal. It was established in 1976 AD. The founders of the school are former Pradhanpancha Gyan Bahadur Chemjong Limbu, Hansa Bahadur Rai and Ganesh Kumari Chemjong Limbu. The land of the main school building and playground was donated by Tika Prasad Chemjong Limbu. In addition, former Subba Prem Bahadur Chemjong Limbu and Mandhoj Chemjong Limbu had donated seven Bigha of land to the school for farming to generate income to support teachers' payment.
