= Shonphi Dashain Higher Secondary School =

High school in Mahottari District of Nepal

- Nepali: सोन्फी दशै मावि श्रीपुर
- Aurahi, Mahottari District, Madhesh Province; Nepal

Information
- Other name: Sonphi Dashain High School Shreepur
- School type: High school

Shonphi Dashain Higher Secondary School, commonly known as Sonphi Dashain High School Shreepur (Nepali: सोन्फी दशै मावि श्रीपुर), is a public high school in Aurahi Municipality, ward no. 3, in Mahottari District of Nepal. It is one of the schools designated for technical education in collaboration with Council for Technical Education and Vocational Training (CTEVT), under which it runs Diploma in Civil Engineering programme. New buildings for the technical school and a library were unveiled by the State Minister of Health Surendra Yadav.
