= Balmiki Education Foundation =

- Birtamod - 1, Jagat Basti Tol; Birtamode Municipality, Jhapa; Nepal

Information
- Type: Higher Secondary School and University
- Motto: Tamasoma Jyotirgamaya
- Established: 2003 (2059 B.S.)
- President: Gopal Kumar Basnet
- Director: Anand Kumar Basnet
- Principal: Anand Kumar Basnet
- Enrollment: 2200+
- Language: English
- Sports: Cricket, football, volleyball, basketball, badmintons, etc.
- Nickname: BAEFOU
- Affiliation: Tribuvan University, SEE, HSEB
- Website: www.balmiki.edu.np//

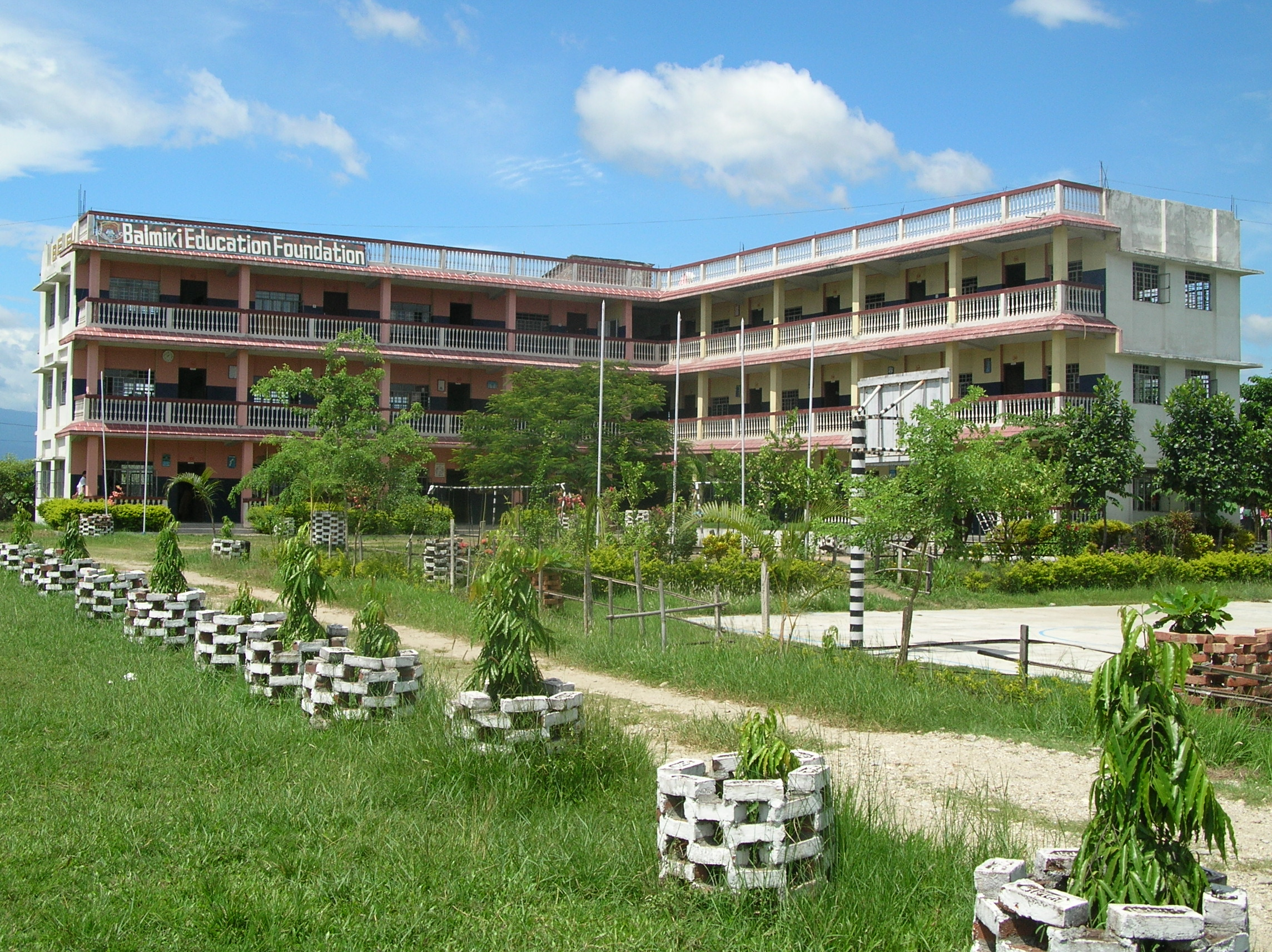
Balmiki Education Foundation (Main Building)

Balmiki Education Foundation is the higher secondary school based in Birtamod-1, Jhapa, Nepal. Balmiki Edu Foundation was established in 2003. It is located in the outskirts of Birtamod city.
