= Malpi International school =

School in Nepal

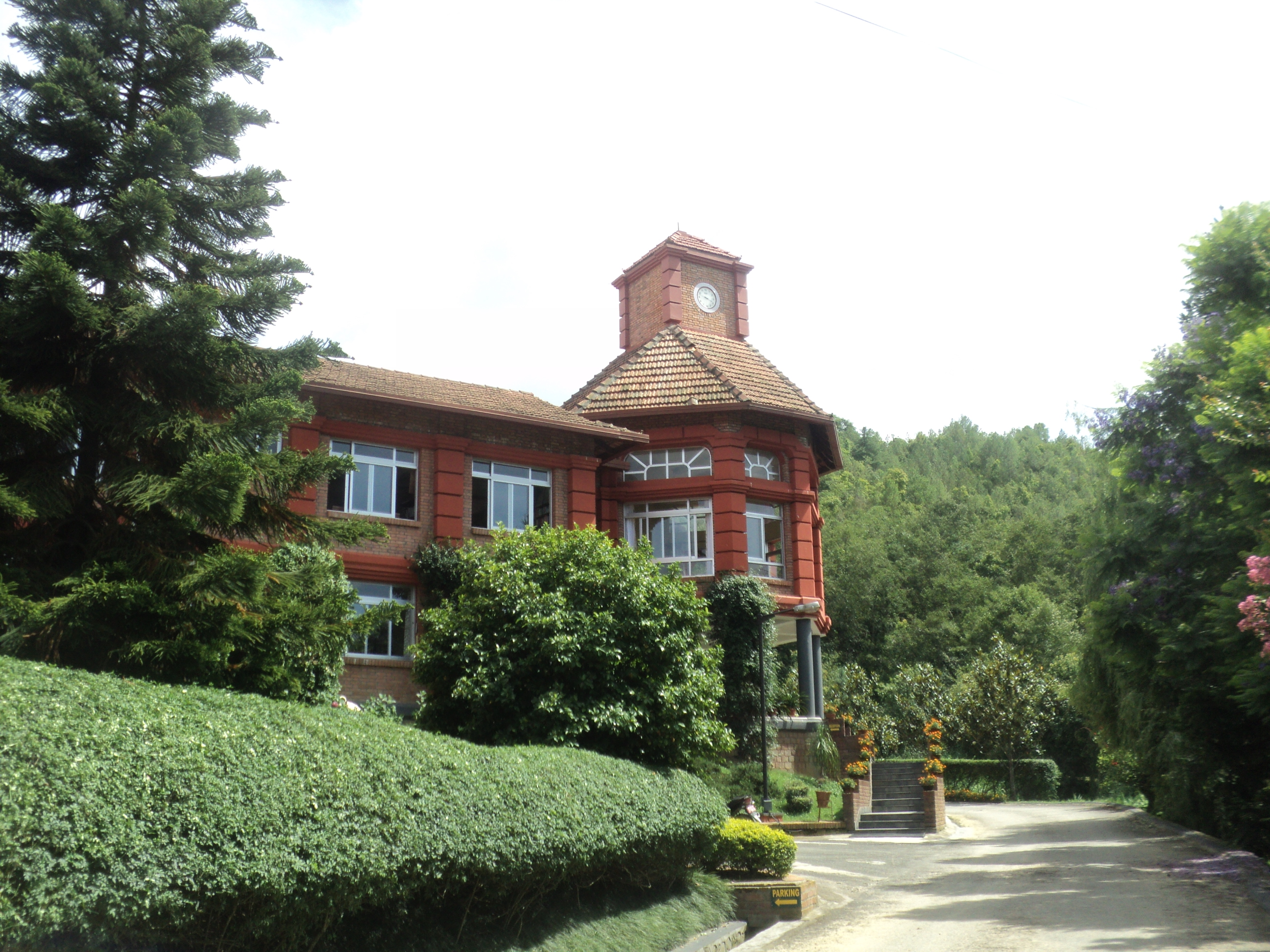
Malpi International School

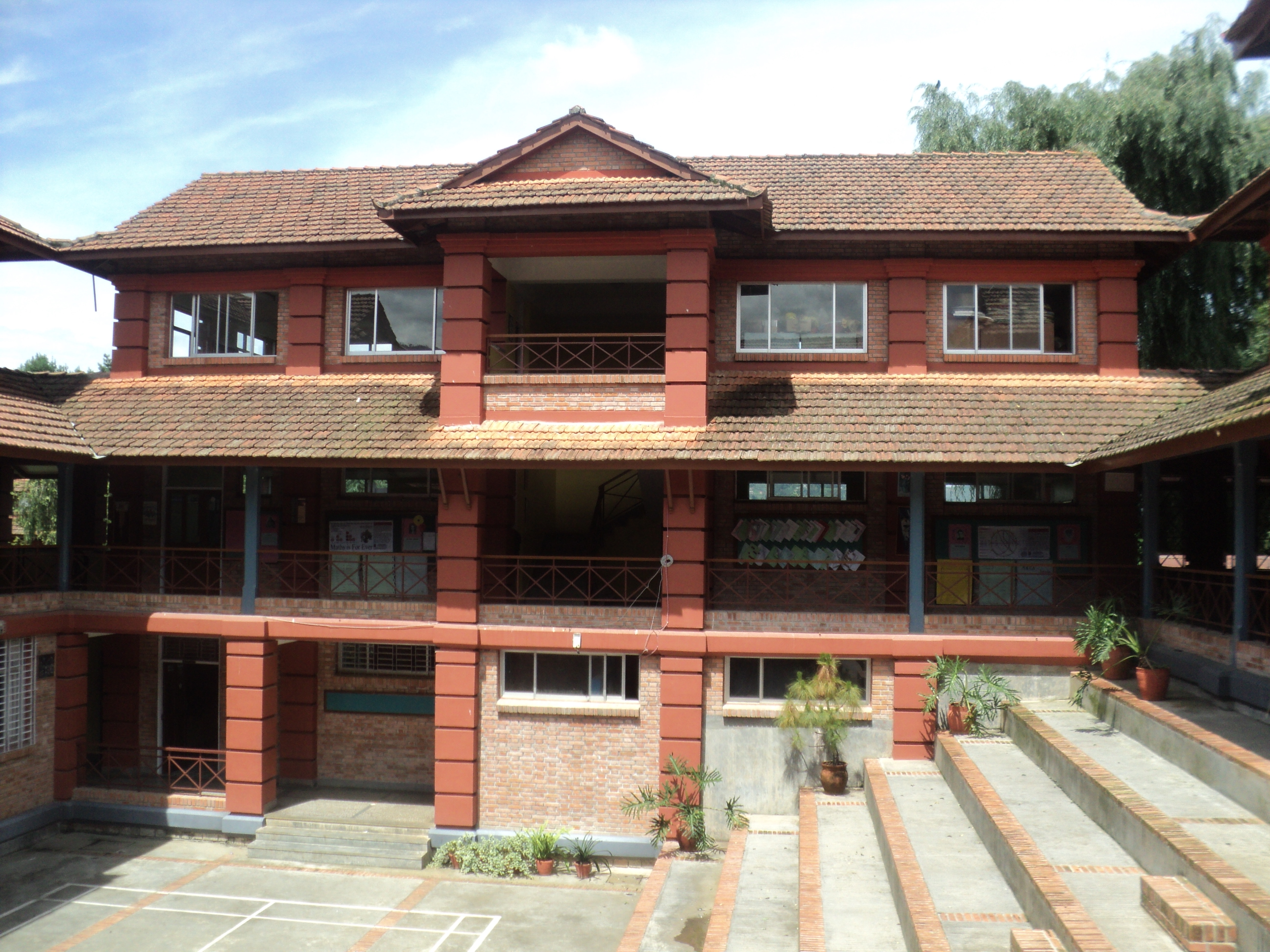
School Courtyard

Malpi International School was established in June 1999 in Nepal. The school was conceptualized by the idea of a group of 50 professionals and was designed by Architects Deepak Man Sherchan and Jyoti Sherchan (Creative Builders Collaborative, CBC architectural firm). Currently the school is headed by the Principal Mr.Robert Wilson.

== Location ==
Malpi International School is located in Panauti village, just beside the Roshi River (Malpi-9, Panauti, Kavre, Panauti 00977, Nepal).
