= Vishwajyoti Higher Secondary School =

Address
- Pragatinagar 3, Nawalparasi; Nepal

Information
- Type: Private
- Motto: Towards Excellence
- Established: 1994
- Principal: Pradeep Bastola
- Grades: Montessori to 12
- Website: vishwajyoti.edu.np

== History ==
Vishwajyoti Higher Secondary School was established at Nawalparasi, Nepal in the year 2051 BS (1994 CE). Founded by a group of professionals in the field of education in collaboration with the Nawal English Boarding School {established 2039 B.S (AD 1982) at Rajhar V.D.C.} to promote English education at primary and secondary levels. The school was called the Nawal English Boarding School (NEBS) up until 2056 BS (1999 CE). NEBS later merged with Vishwa Jyoti English Boarding School in 2057 BS (2000 CE). In the year 2064 BS (2007 CE) the school upgraded itself to the higher secondary level, affiliated with the Higher Secondary Education Board (H.S.E.B.), and started offering classes in the science and management streams.

== Infrastructure ==
The school is spread over 3.35 acres (2.0 Nepal bigha) housing 8 blocks of buildings providing 76 rooms used to run the classes, library, science lab, computer lab, audio-visual room, hostel accommodation, and food/lodging facilities.
