= Naaya Aayam Multi-Disciplinary Institute =

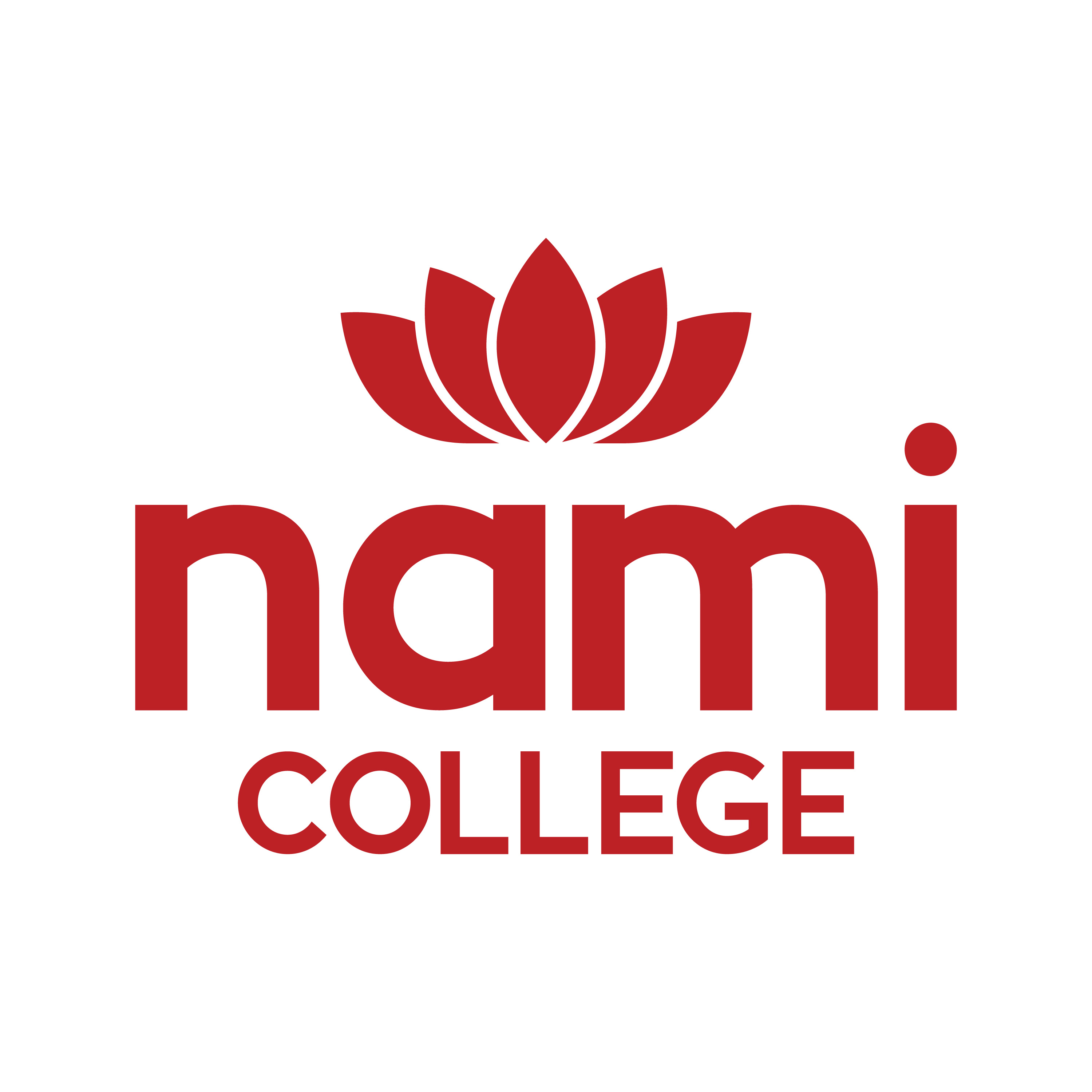

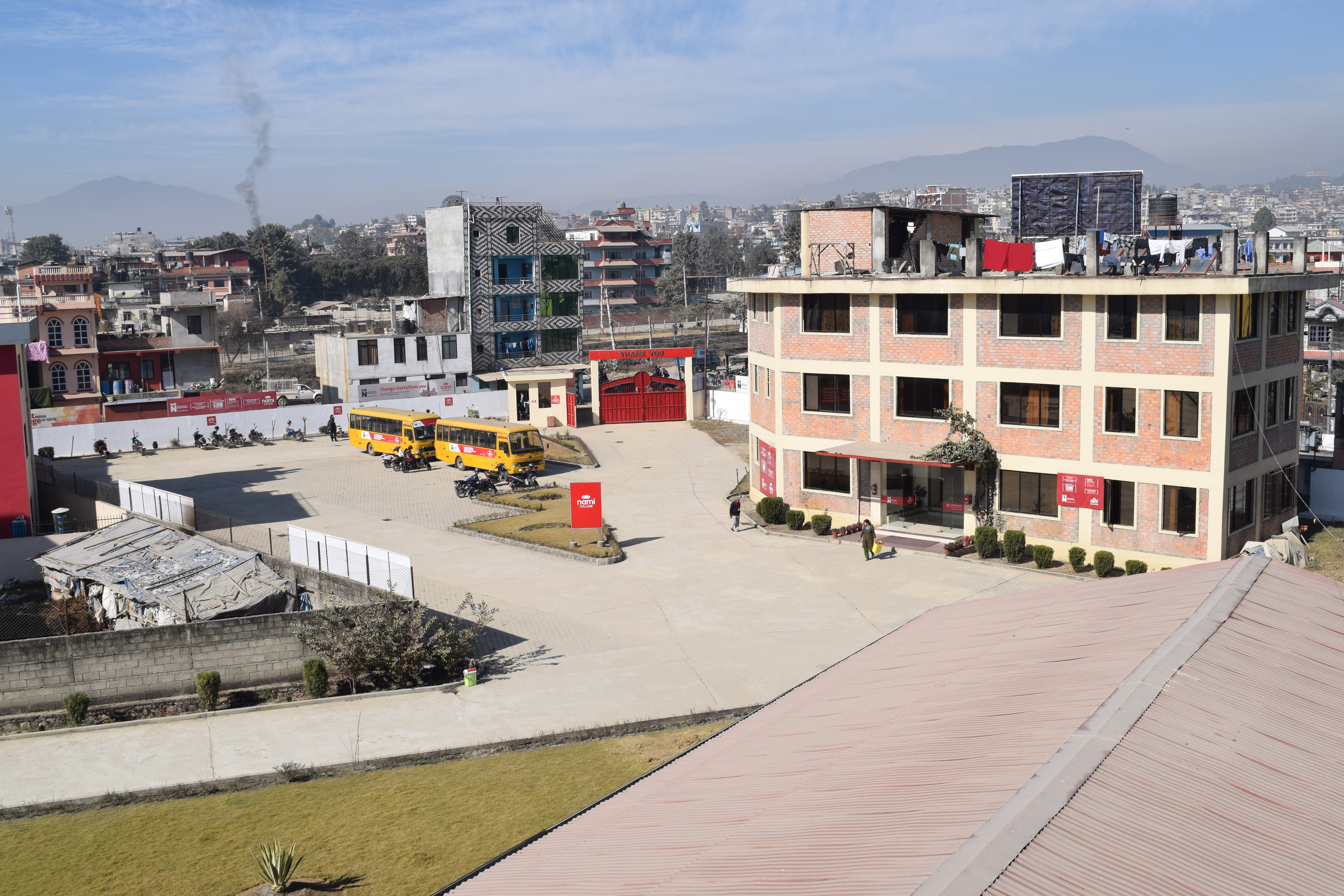
Admin Block

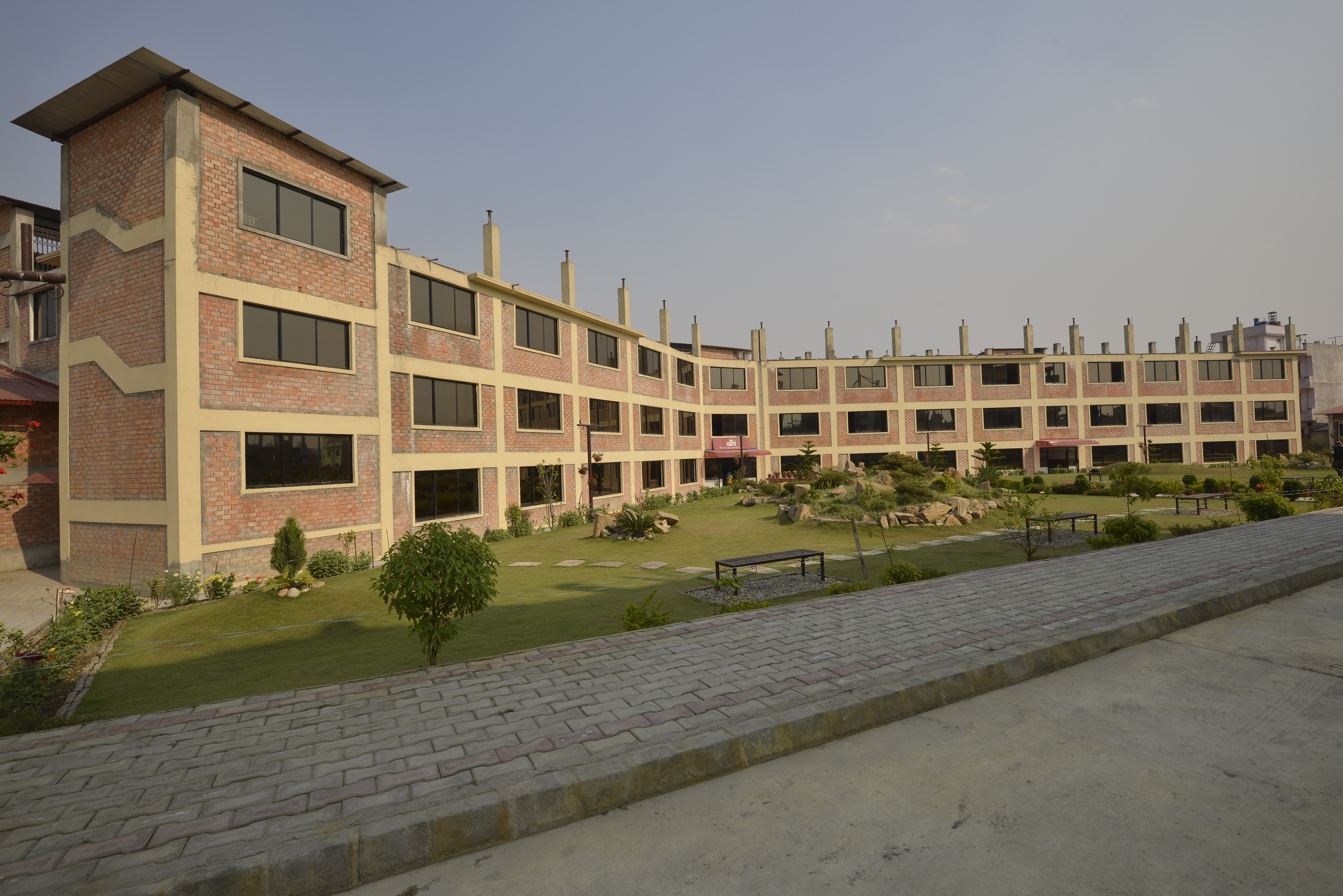
Main Building

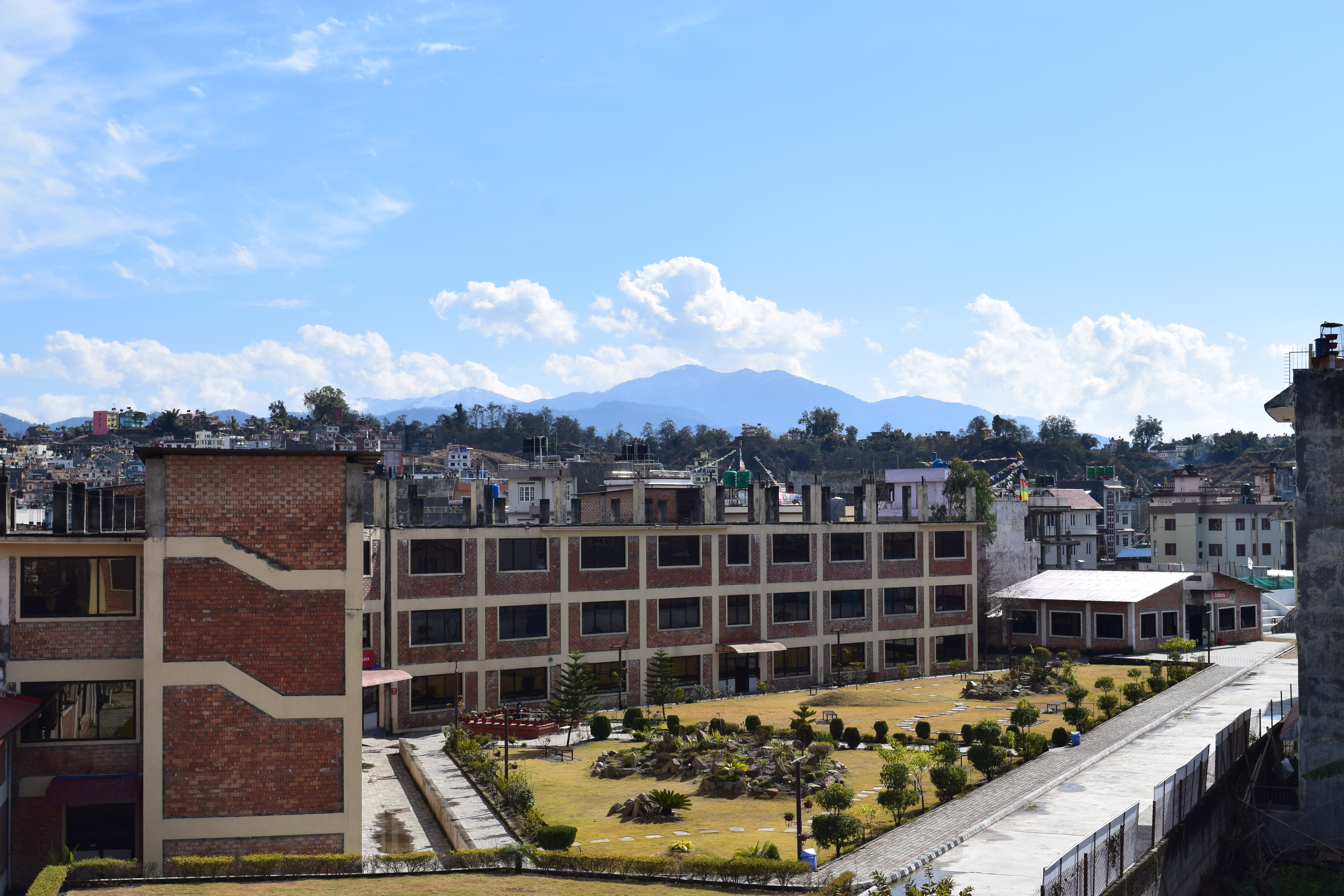
Academic Block

Naaya Aayam Multi-Disciplinary Institute (NAMI), established in 2013, is an education foundation located in Baneswor, Kathmandu, Nepal. The college directly works with its roots tied to University of Northampton, UK, providing Undergraduate and Graduate Degrees and Cambridge International Examinations for GCE ‘A’ Level.

== Infrastructure ==
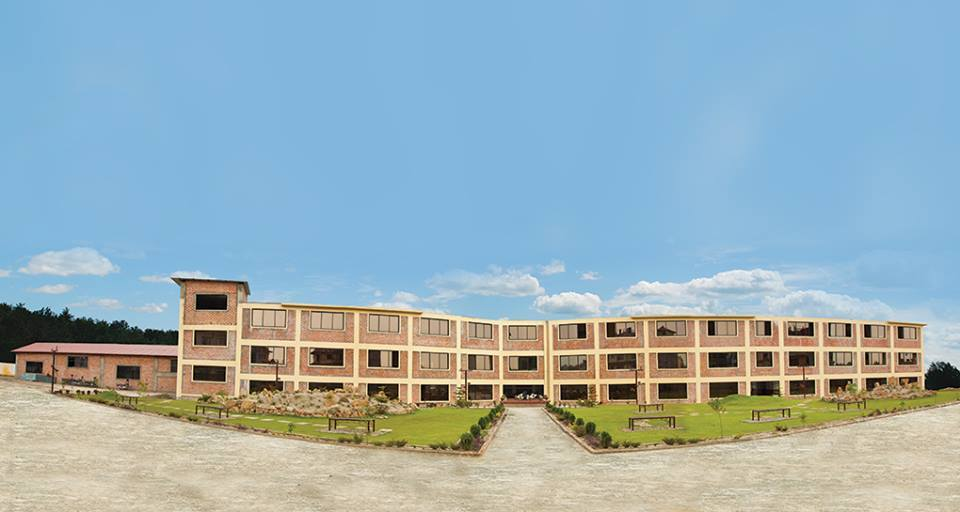
NAMI College

NAMI is stretched over 37 ropani land built with modern auditoriums, classrooms, tutorial/discussion rooms, library and computer and science laboratories. It also has sports arena for basketball, mini-football and cricket practice pitch.

== Notable people ==
- Arzu Rana Deuba– Chairperson, UNESCO Regional Councillor, founder and former president of SAATHI and Rural Women's Development and Unity Centre (RUWDUC)
