= Nobel Academy =

Nobel Academy H.S School and College
- नाेबेल एकेडेमी
- New Baneshwor, Nepal; Nepal

Information
- Type: Private, (Morning and Day)
- Motto: "Knowledge is Power"
- Established: 1 January 1998
- Staff: 34
- Enrolment: 2500 (approx.)
- Classes: Management, Science, Fine Art
- Color: Blue
- Song: We are Nobelian
- Newspaper: Nobel Magazine
- Website: www.nobel.edu.np

Nobel Academy is a private co-educational school located in Kathmandu, Nepal established in 1988. The school educates pupils from Grade 1 to Grade 12, with specialized programs in Science, Management and Fine Arts at a higher secondary level. The institution provides HSEB courses approved by the Nepal Government, known as the "10+2 program" in the Faculties of Science, Management and Fine Art. The academy has a fully equipped computer lab, a science lab and sports facilities.
