= Mukti High School =

School in Nepal

Coordinates: 28.09995710148569°N 82.84564132654378°E

Mukti High School (abbreviated as MHS) is a high school that was established in the mid-western region of Nepal in 1995, making it the oldest school there. It was named “Mukti” in honor of the Congress Mukti Sena (Nepali Congress' Liberation Army) which took part in the democratic revolution of 1951 (Bikram Sambat, BS 2007).

== History ==
Immediately after the revolution, Mr. Pratiman Chand Bohara was appointed as the commander of Mukti Sena (then called as Bada hakim). With his strong will to promote education in rural Nepal, Mr. Bohara influenced his battalion to contribute three months of their salary as seed money to begin the MHS in Ratamata, Pyuthan. One of the founders of MHS, then Secretary of Education of the Government of Nepal, Mr. Shiva Raj Subedee led a team of local activists to sanction Pyuthan's share from Land Revenue Office (Mal Karyalaya) in Ghorai, Dang (about 60–70 km southwest from Ratamata, Pyuthan via walking trail). Out of NPR 13,000, 3,000 was shared with the School in Khalanga, the district capital of Pyuthan and MHS had received a total of NPR 10,000 as a start-up money.

When the democratic republic was turned down and partyless federal royalist came into power in 1960 (BS 2017), Janata High School in Bagdula, Pyuthan (about 10–12 km northeast from Ratamata) was established after separating from the MHS with the effort of some local activists and Mr. Mukhya Nath Tiwari, an Indian National and the then headmaster. A political upheaval between the local people of Ratamata area and Bagdula area created a tug-of-war sometimes around 1962 to amalgamate the two schools into one central location, somewhere near Punyakhola. In the proposal brought out by the then Badahakim (Chief District Officer, CDO), Mr. Ratna Bahadur Gurung, it was stated that either each school had to contribute around NPR 9,000 or the two schools be amalgamated. During that time MHS local activists and founder members Mr. Shiva Raj Subedee, Mr. Tanka Bahadur Bista (a long time Member of Parliament, MP), Mr. Dina Mani Bhandari, and Khageswar Sharma showed their discomfort for the amalgamation proposal. These four members completely rejected the proposal to amalgamate MHS with Janata High School, rather donated some funds to start the school by selling their personal lands. In addition to these four members, there are several local activists who have dedicated their resources both in kind and cash including Mr. Gir Bahadur Thapa, who has donated 28 Ropanies of land to MHS. Their dedication to run MHS as an autonomous institution is considered a great contribution in establishing the school at its current location in Ratamata.

Around 1965-66 (BS 2022/23), there was a military intervention within the MHS compound and several students and teachers were arrested by the government on charges of political affiliation and ideological differences. This resulted in chaos and ceasing of school activities for several months. Rather than searching solutions and resolving local problems from within the district, the then government appointed Mr. Uday Man Singh, a native of Kathmandu for the position of headmaster of MHS. This resulted in political upheaval and instability in MHS's day-to-day administration and teaching activities.

In 2009 (BS 2066), the MHS took a lead to run as a 10+2 Higher Secondary School with the establishment of Pratiman Nima Memorial Trust and Indian Embassy's financial assistance. The total amount on Indian Embassy's contribution was NPR 2,80,00000 to build three-storey school building, boundary wall, a ladies hostel, a guard house and a water tank towards creating physical infrastructure to run the faculty of science. Currently, Science, Humanities and Commerce have been the three major faculties at MHS's 10+2 curriculum.

== See also ==
- Education in Nepal
- Ministry of Education, Science and Technology (Nepal)
