= Gyanjyoti Higher Secondary School =

- ज्ञानज्योति उच्च माध्यमिक विद्यालय

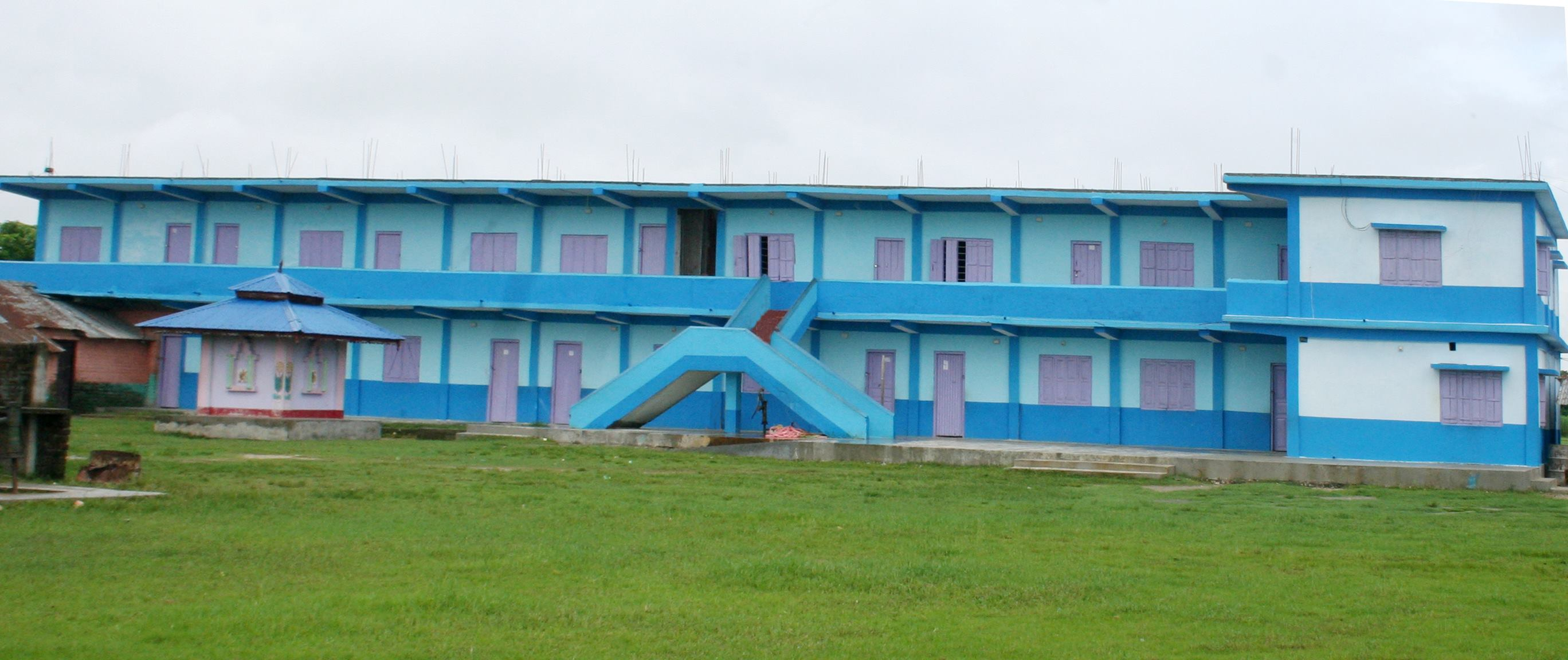

Location
- Bahradashi-3; Jhapa; Nepal
- Coordinates: 26.50670°N 87.94028°E

Information
- School type: Private
- Motto: Knowledge is Power (तमसो मा ज्योतिर्गमय)
- Founded: 1994 AD/2051 BS
- Founder: Narayan Prashad Dhakal
- Status: open
- School district: Jhapa
- Principal: Amrit Bahadur Budhathoki
- Enrollment: About 800
- Classes: Nursery to class 12
- Language: English
- Hours in school day: 6 Hours
- Classrooms: about 30
- Slogan: Education is power

GJHSS SLC Farewell Batch 2071BS Section-A

Gyanjyoti Higher Secondary School, situated at Rajgadh is a school of Jhapa district located south-east of the headquarters Chandragadhi. Established in 1994 (2051 BS), it is providing education to the students. Initially started as primary level at Mr. Narayan Dhakal's house (former Principal) in 1949 BS, it has got its registration since 2051 BS. Later in 2057 BS, it produced the first S.L.C. Batch.
