= Bhalam =

Bhalam भलाम
- Subdivision of Pokhara
- Location in Nepal Bhalam (Nepal)
- Coordinates: 28.26°N 84.01°E
- Country: Nepal
- Zone: Gandaki Zone
- District: Kaski District

Government
  - Type: Local Government
  - Chairperson: Ganga Kc (CPN-UML)

Population (2011)
  - Total: 4,022
- Time zone: UTC+5:45 (Nepal Time)

Bhalam was a Village Development Committee, north of Pokhara in the Valam Municipality of Kaski District, situated in the Gandaki Zone of the Western Development Region, located in northern-central Nepal. In 2015, the VDC was amalgamated with Pokhara. Bhalam is located around 950 m above sea level, 5 km from the city of Pokhara.

== Population ==
At the 2011 Nepal census, Bhalam had a population of 4,022.

== Literacy & Education ==
In 2001, 2300 people were literate, 1024 of them were male and 1276 were female. However, a total of 402 inhabitants could not read or write, including 39 males and 363 females.

There were 721 people in the Valam region eligible for attending school, but only 434 were actually enrolled in schools (291 males and 143 females).

Shree Mahendra Secondary School is only one Secondary Level School in the village. Here currently in 2023, about 350 students attend. It facilitates Technical Steam or Plant Science or Agricultural Stream from Grade 9 to Grade XII.

== Marital status ==
According to the 1991 census, 2118 people were identified as having a marital status.; 15 of these were identified as being married with more than one spouse (polygamy).

== Structure ==
Like in many other villages of Nepal, the Gurungs live in higher parts of the village (mainly Dadagaun and Bhathal), and the Brahmins and Kshtrees inhabit the lower regions of Valam Phant, Rayalechaur and Khora. Some dalits live in both upper and lower parts.

The village now have some number of facilities. There have been Paved roads builds that give some relaxation during the monsoon season. Now during the monsoon now there is access to the market to sell goods, and income can be generated from both during the monsoon from agriculture and selling goods. As a consequence, having improved facilities large-scale migration to neighbouring cities has taken place and even emigration to foreign countries, leaving the village almost empty. Day by day many youths are leaving the village for good opportunity and employment.

== Culture ==
Although not generally known for its rich traditions, Bhalam has become known because of its HariHar Cave (Gupha), being a religious site for Hindu. Every year a fair (mela) is held by local youths at the occasion of the Holi (or Phagu Purnima) the 3-day festival of colours. Volleyball competitions are held and dances are performed, attracting citizens in and around Pokhara. Another large event is the annual athletic competition of the British Gurkha recruits each carrying 25 kg of weights to the highest point of the village.

== Local Life ==
People are engaged in agriculture, government and private jobs for their livelihood. Most local people are Hindus, Buddhists and Christians living in the village. Gurung, Sharki, Damai, Kaami, Newar, Brahaman, and Chhetri ethnicities exist in and around Bhalam contributing to a mixture of people and traditions. Festivals celebrated in Bhalam include Dashain, Tihar, Teej, Lhosar, and Janai Purnima etc. Every year a fair is held during different occasions such as Holi, which is an exciting festival of colors.

== Major attractions ==
The area features several caves, such as Harihar Cave and Birendra Cave. North of the Khola River is Hari Har Ghupa, a religious site for Hindu people. Bhalam is a rural area located near Pokhara, with footpaths and traditional buildings.
