= School Leaving Certificate (Nepal) =

Nepal secondary school leaving examination

Final Exam of Secondary Education (Grade 12) in Nepal
- Acronym: SLC
- Year Started: 1989/04)20
- Year Ended: 2019 (SLC was moved to Class 11 and Class 12, also known as +2 course, which is equivalent to GCE/A-Level of England)
- Status: Active
- Succeeded by: Secondary Education Examination (SEE) as Class 10 Examination Equivalent of GCSE
- Website: neb.gov.np

The School Leaving Certificate, commonly abbreviated as SLC, is the final examination of the secondary education Grade 12, also known as the +2 in Nepal, and formerly the final examinations of Grade 10. The +2 is generally pursued after completing the Secondary Education Examination (SEE), which is the final examination of Grade 10.

The SLC examination is considered the most important examinations in the educational system of Nepal for building an academic career.

The SLC examination is normally scheduled from April to June every year. The examinations are conducted by the National Examination Board (NEB).

Until 2016, SLC was the final examinations of Grade 10, popularly referred to as the "Iron Gate". However, after 2016, the Grade 10 examination was replaced with the Secondary Education Examination (SEE). Following this reform, the SLC was reassigned to the final examination of Grade 12. The +2 is equivalent to GCE or A-level of United Kingdom.

== Examination Centers ==
Nepal was formerly divided into five development regions and seventy-five districts, each with multiple examination centers. While examination questions varied from one region to another, they remained consistent within each individual region. This meant that if an exam were to be canceled, only one region would be affected, and only the questions for that specific region would need to be prepared. Examinations are conducted simultaneously nationwide. Different centers are designated for students from different schools.

== Results ==
The results are typically published by the Examination Control Board about two and a half to three months after the examinations. Students are categorized into five divisions based on their scores.

Despite the relatively low passing threshold for the examination, many students, particularly those attending government schools in rural areas of Nepal, still fail the exam every year due to its level of difficulty. Government schools are often perceived as providing less rigorous education compared to private schools, resulting in government school students being reportedly less likely to pass the exam. Students who fail to score above 40 marks in each subject are declared failed. The outcome of the SLC holds significant importance for individual students, as those with high percentages can qualify for various scholarships for their higher secondary level education.

The Government of Nepal has introduced a new system for the SLC, which has both advantages and disadvantages in its implementation. While the new system reduces the number of students failing the exam, those with low Grade Point Index (GPI) face challenges in gaining admission to higher-level studies. This aspect of the education system has received significant criticism.

== Criticism ==
Some educationalists in Nepal criticize the SLC exam, arguing that it lacks importance in the present context, leading to its replacement by SEE. They assert that the tests are neither standardized nor capable of assessing the capacity of Nepalese children. Education experts have been urging the government to review and revise the SLC examinations for the past three decades. However, they claim that the government continues to operate using the same old mechanism, which they believe will persist for several more decades. Additionally, they express concern over the lack of a consistent trend in SLC examination results, making the School Leaving Certificate results unreliable.

In 2010, the mathematics question paper was leaked in Bajang, Kailali, Sunsari, Bara, and Banke districts. There was significant criticism after the question paper of SEE 2019 in Province No. 2 was leaked before the exam day. The government postponed and even retook the exam from the previous day. It was believed that the paper was leaked and went viral through different social sites and free video calling applications like IMO. The SEE Security Committee, chaired by Education Minister Giriraj Mani Pokharel, made a decision and handed the case to the CIB for investigation.
