= Jhapa 3 =

Parliamentary constituency in Koshi Province, Nepal

- Parliamentary constituency
- Jhapa 3 in Koshi Province
- Province: Koshi
- District: Jhapa
- Electorate: 1,40,857
- Major settlements: Bhadrapur (1-8), kachankawal, Haldibari, Barahadashi and Birtamod-10

Current constituency
- Created: 1991
- Party: Rastriya Swatantra Party
- Member: Prakash Pathak
- Member of the Provincial Assembly: Bhumi Prasad Rajbanshi
- Member of the Provincial Assembly: Chabilal Chudal

Jhapa 3 is one of five parliamentary constituencies of Jhapa District in Nepal. It came into existence on the Constituency Delimitation Commission (CDC) report submitted on 31 August 2017.

== Incorporated areas ==
Jhapa 3 incorporates Kachankawal Rural Municipality, Haldibari Rural Municipality, Barhadashi Rural Municipality, ward 10 of Birtamod Municipality and wards 1–8 of Bhadrapur Municipality.

== Assembly segments ==
It encompasses the following Province No. 1 Provincial Assembly segment

- Jhapa 3(A)
- Jhapa 3(B)

== Members of Parliament ==
=== Parliament/Constituent Assembly ===
Election	Member	Party
1991	Radha Krishna Mainali	CPN (Unified Marxist–Leninist)
1994	Devi Prasad Ojha	CPN (Unified Marxist–Leninist)
1999	Narendra Bikram Nemwang	Nepali Congress
2008	Purna Prasad Rajbanshi	CPN (Maoist)
January 2009	Purna Prasad Rajbanshi	UCPN (Maoist)
2013	Krishna Prasad Sitaula	Nepali Congress
2017	Rajendra Prasad Lingden	Rastriya Prajatantra Party
2022	Rajendra Prasad Lingden	Rastriya Prajatantra Party
2026	Prakash Pathak	Rastriya Swatantra Party

=== Provincial Assembly ===
==== 3(A) ====
Election	Member	Party
2017	Basanta Kumar Baniya	CPN (Unified Marxist-Leninist)
May 2018	Basanta Kumar Baniya	Nepal Communist Party
March 2021	Basanta Kumar Baniya	CPN (Unified Marxist–Leninist)

==== 3(B) ====
Election	Member	Party
2017	Purna Prasad Rajbansi	CPN (Maoist Centre)
May 2018	Purna Prasad Rajbansi	Nepal Communist Party
March 2021	Purna Prasad Rajbansi	CPN (Maoist Centre)

== Election results ==
=== Election in the 2020s ===
==== 2026 general election ====
Candidate	Party	Votes	%
Prakash Pathak	Rastriya Swatantra Party	38,674	46.87
Rajendra Prasad Lingden	Rastriya Prajatantra Party	17,294	20.96
Rajendra Kumar Ghimire	Nepali Congress	8,199	9.94
Hari Bahadur Rajbanshi	Communist Party of Nepal (Unified Marxist–Leninist)	7,492	9.08
Dipak Timsina	Shram Sanskriti Party	7,339	8.90
Dilliram Ghimire	Nepali Communist Party	1,450	1.76
Others		2,058	2.49
Total		82,506	100.00
Valid votes		82,506	93.61
Invalid/blank votes		5,629	6.39
Total votes		88,135	100.00
Registered voters/turnout		140,857	62.57
Majority		21,380	
Rastriya Swatantra Party gain			

==== 2022 general election ====
Candidate	Party	Votes	%
Rajendra Prasad Lingden	Rastriya Prajatantra Party	40,662	47.95
Krishna Prasad Sitaula	Nepali Congress	37,386	44.08
Prakash Pathak	Rastriya Swatantra Party	3,461	4.08
Others		3,299	3.89
Total		84,808	100.00
Majority		3,276	
Rastriya Prajatantra Party hold			

==== 2022 provincial election ====
===== 3(A) =====
Candidate	Party	Votes	%
Bhumi Prasad Rajbanshi	Nepali Congress	20,770	47.79
Bashant Kumar Baniya	CPN (UML)	19,701	45.33
Madanhang Tawa Limbu	Mongol National Organisation	1,117	2.57
Others	1,872	4.31	
Total		43,460	100.00
Majority		1,069	
Nepali Congress			

===== 3(B) =====
Candidate	Party	Votes	%
Chhabilal Chudal	CPN (UML)	19,875	47.09
Purna Prasad Rjbanshi	CPN (Maoist Centre)	13,833	32.78
Man Prakash Sangraula	Hamro Nepali Party	2,906	6.89
Yam Kumar Shrestha	Mongol National Organisation	1,535	3.64
Dhurba Kumar Shrestha	People's Socialist Party	913	2.16
Navaraj Kharel	CPN (Marxist–Leninist)	861	2.04
Thir Bahadur Khawas	Sanghiya Loktantrik Rastriya Manch	787	1.86
Pradeep Kumar Rajbanshi	Janamat Party	765	1.81
Others	729	1.73	
Total		42,204	100.00
Majority		6,042	
CPN (UML)			

=== Election in the 2010s ===
==== 2017 legislative elections ====
Party	Candidate	Votes
Rastriya Prajatantra Party	Rajendra Prasad Lingden	44,614
Nepali Congress	Krishna Prasad Sitaula	31,171
CPN (Marxist–Leninist)	Navaraj Kharel	1,306
Others		1,841
Invalid votes		4,312
Result	RPP gain	
Source: Election Commission

==== 2017 Nepalese provincial elections ====
===== 3(A) =====
Party	Candidate	Votes
CPN (Unified Marxist–Leninist)	Basanta Kumar Baniya	22,553
Nepali Congress	Bhumi Prasad Rajbanshi	17,005
Others		1,392
Invalid votes		1,312
Result	CPN (UML) gain	
Source: Election Commission

===== 3(B) =====
Party	Candidate	Votes
CPN (Maoist Centre)	Purna Prasad Rajbanshi	22,065
Nepali Congress	Bhagirath Kumar Poddar	14,735
Others		2,527
Invalid votes		1,527
Result	Maoist Centre gain	
Source: Election Commission

==== 2013 Constituent Assembly election ====
Party	Candidate	Votes
Nepali Congress	Krishna Prasad Sitaula	14,355
Rastriya Prajatantra Party Nepal	Rajendra Prasad Lingden	9,253
CPN (Unified Marxist–Leninist)	Basanta Kumar Baniya	6,462
UCPN (Maoist)	Dharma Shila Chapagain	6,217
Madheshi Janaadhikar Forum, Nepal (Democratic)	Bharatendu Kumar Mallik	3,798
Federal Socialist Party, Nepal	Bijay Kumar Kerung	1,358
Others		2,291
Result	Congress gain	
Source: NepalNews

=== Election in the 2000s ===
==== 2008 Constituent Assembly election ====
Party	Candidate	Votes
CPN (Maoist)	Purna Prasad Rajbanshi	16,685
Nepali Congress	Krishna Prasad Sitaula	14,049
CPN (Unified Marxist–Leninist)	Pushpa Raj Pokharel	9,654
CPN (Marxist–Leninist)	Navaraj Kharel	2,236
Rastriya Prajatantra Party	Gopal Bahadur Ghimire	1,141
Others		3,002
Invalid votes		2,649
Result	Maoist gain	
Source: Election Commission

=== Election in the 1990s ===
==== 1999 legislative elections ====
Party	Candidate	Votes
Nepali Congress	Narendra Bikram Limbu	21,030
CPN (Unified Marxist–Leninist)	Bishnu Prasad Prasai	17,657
CPN (Marxist–Leninist)	Puspa Raj Pokharel	8,219
Rastriya Prajatantra Party	Kalyan Khadka	1,211
Independent	Shanti Lal Dhimal	1,098
Others		2,075
Invalid Votes		1,569
Result	Congress gain	
Source: Election Commission

==== 1994 legislative elections ====
Party	Candidate	Votes
CPN (Unified Marxist–Leninist)	Devi Prasad Ojha	16,674
Nepali Congress	Gopal Kumar Basnet	13,614
Rastriya Prajatantra Party	Chandra Dangi	4,125
Others		2,951
Result	CPN (UML) hold	
Source: Election Commission

==== 1991 legislative elections ====
Party	Candidate	Votes
CPN (Unified Marxist–Leninist)	Radha Krishna Mainali	20,050
Nepali Congress	Chakra Prasad Bastola	13,721
Result	CPN (UML) gain	

== See also ==
- List of parliamentary constituencies of Nepal
