= Jhapa 4 =

Parliamentary constituency in Province No. 1, Nepal

- Parliamentary constituency
- Jhapa 4 in Koshi Province
- Province: Koshi
- District: Jhapa District
- Electorate: 130,712

Current constituency
- Created: 1991
- Member of Parliament: Shambhu Prasad Dhakal (RSP)
- Member of the Provincial Assembly: Jhalak Bahadur Magar
- Member of the Provincial Assembly: Hari Kumar Thapa

Jhapa 4 is one of five parliamentary constituencies of Jhapa District in Nepal. This constituency came into existence on the Constituency Delimitation Commission (CDC) report submitted on 31 August 2017.

== Incorporated areas ==
Jhapa 4 incorporates Jhapa Rural Municipality, Shivasatakshi Municipality, wards 1–7 of Kankai Municipality, wards 1 and 2 of Gauriganj Rural Municipality and ward 9 of Gauradaha Municipality.

== Assembly segments ==
It encompasses the following Province No. 1 Provincial Assembly segment

- Jhapa 4(A)
- Jhapa 4(B)

== Members of Parliament ==
=== Parliament/Constituent Assembly ===
Election	Member	Party
1991	Narayan Singh Rajbanshi	CPN (Unified Marxist–Leninist)
1994	Chakra Prasad Bastola	Nepali Congress
2008	Dharma Shila Chapagain	CPN (Maoist)
January 2009	Dharma Shila Chapagain	UCPN (Maoist)
2013	Prem Bahadur Giri	CPN (Unified Marxist–Leninist)
2017	Lal Prasad Sawa Limbu	CPN (Unified Marxist–Leninist)
May 2018	Lal Prasad Sawa Limbu	Nepal Communist Party
March 2021	Lal Prasad Sawa Limbu	CPN (Unified Marxist–Leninist)
2022	Lal Prasad Sawa Limbu	CPN (Unified Marxist–Leninist)
2026	Shambhu Prasad Dhakal	Rastriya Swatantra Party

=== Provincial Assembly ===
==== 4(A) ====
Election	Member	Party
2017	Jhalak Bahadur Magar	CPN (Maoist Centre)
May 2018	Jhalak Bahadur Magar	Nepal Communist Party
March 2021	Jhalak Bahadur Magar	CPN (Maoist Centre)

==== 4(B) ====
Election	Member	Party
2017	Hari Kumar Thapa	CPN (Unified Marxist-Leninist)
May 2018	Hari Kumar Thapa	Nepal Communist Party
March 2021	Hari Kumar Thapa	CPN (Unified Marxist–Leninist)

== Election results ==
=== Election in the 2020s ===
==== 2026 general election ====
Candidate	Party	Votes	%	+/–
Shambhu Prasad Dhakal	Rastriya Swatantra Party	43,631	56.43	▲37.63
Lal Prasad Sawa Limbu	CPN (UML)	11,986	15.50	▼23.67
Deu Kumar Thebe Limbu	Nepali Congress	9,434	12.20	▼17.8
Amrita Devi Rai	Shram Sanskriti Party	7,161	9.26	New entry
Bhakti Prasad Sitaula	Rastriya Prajatantra Party	2,080	2.69	New entry
Purushottam Chudal	Nepali Communist Party	1,362	1.76	New entry
Santosh Tamang	Ujyaalo Nepal Party	432	0.56	New entry
Lothro Hemram	Janamat Party	260	0.34	▲0.18
Kiran Limbu Lingden	Sanghiya Loktantrik Rastriya Manch	141	0.18	▲0.01
Tara Bahadur Thapa	Nepal Communist Party (Maoist)	125	0.16	New entry
Dilip Dhimal	Mongol National Organisation	120	0.16	▼0.12
Others		582	0.75	
Total		77,314	100.00	–
Valid votes		77,314	94.19	
Invalid/blank votes		4,768	5.81	
Total votes		82,082	100.00	
Registered voters/turnout		130,712	62.80	
Majority		31,645		
Rastriya Swatantra Party gain				

==== 2022 general election ====
Candidate	Party	Votes	%
Lal Prasad Sawa Limbu	CPN (UML)	29,315	39.17
Deu Kumar Thebe Limbu	Nepali Congress	22,448	30.00
Shambhu Prasad Dhakal	Rastriya Swatantra Party	14,069	18.80
Khushbu Oli	Independent	5,010	6.69
Others		3,994	5.34
Total		74,836	100.00
Majority		6,867	
CPN (UML) hold			

==== 2022 provincial election ====
===== 4(A) =====
Candidate	Party	Votes	%
Radhakrishna Khanal	CPN (UML)	13,951	44.08
Jhalak Bahadur Magar	CPN (Maoist Centre)	12,373	39.09
Umanath Damai	Sanghiya Loktantrik Rastriya Manch	1,591	5.03
Hom Prasad Gautam	Hamro Nepali Party	1,346	4.25
Gondha Tajpuriya	Janamat Party	782	2.47
Others	1,606	5.07	
Total		31,649	100.00
Majority		1,578	
CPN (UML)			

===== 4(B) =====
Candidate	Party	Votes	%
Bhakti Prasad Sitaula	Rastriya Prajatantra Party	19,045	43.40
Ekraj Upreti	Nepali Congress	15,071	34.34
Keshav Bajgain	Hamro Nepali Party	4,142	9.44
Swami Prasad Limbu	Sanghiya Loktantrik Rastriya Manch	2,289	5.22
Ambika Bahadur Tamang	Mongol National Organisation	969	2.21
Kehar Singh Basnet	Independent	863	1.97
Others	1,508	3.44	
Total		43,887	100.00
Majority		3,974	
Rastriya Prajatantra Party			

=== Election in the 2010s ===
==== 2017 legislative elections ====
Party	Candidate	Votes
CPN (Unified Marxist–Leninist)	Lal Prasad Sawa Limbu	43,515
Nepali Congress	Deu Kumar Thebe Limbu	26,822
Sanghiya Loktantrik Rastriya Manch	Gyan Bahadur Imbung Limbu	1,682
Others		2,110
Invalid votes		3,063
Result	CPN (UML) gain	
Source: Election Commission

==== 2017 Nepalese provincial elections ====
===== 4(A) =====
Party	Candidate	Votes
CPN (Maoist Centre)	Jhalak Bahadur Magar	17,256
Nepali Congress	Kiran Bhattarai	12,481
Sanghiya Loktantrik Rastriya Manch	Harka Prasad Limbu	1,457
Others		754
Invalid votes		1,102
Result	Maoist Centre gain	
Source: Election Commission

===== 4(B) =====
Party	Candidate	Votes
CPN (Unified Marxist–Leninist)	Hari Kumar Thapa	24,901
Nepali Congress	Uttam Kumar Sharma	14,965
Rastriya Janata Party Nepal	Surya Narayan Ganesh	1,234
Others		1,390
Invalid votes		1,661
Result	CPN (UML) gain	
Source: Election Commission

==== 2013 Constituent Assembly election ====
Party	Candidate	Votes
CPN (Unified Marxist–Leninist)	Prem Bahadur Giri	22,159
Nepali Congress	Udhhav Thapa	20,177
UCPN (Maoist)	Purushottam Chudal	6,648
Rastriya Prajatantra Party Nepal	Pralhad Sapkota	1,839
Others		2,429
Result	CPN (UML) gain	
Source: NepalNews

=== Election in the 2000s ===
==== 2008 Constituent Assembly election ====
Party	Candidate	Votes
CPN (Maoist)	Dharma Shila Chapagain	19,289
Nepali Congress	Chakra Prasad Bastola	15,502
CPN (Unified Marxist–Leninist)	Devendra Dahal	13,662
CPN (Marxist–Leninist)	Prem Prasad Dahal	1,847
Others		3,164
Invalid votes		2,916
Result	Maoist gain	
Source: Election Commission

=== Election in the 1990s ===
==== 1999 legislative elections ====
Party	Candidate	Votes
Nepali Congress	Chakra Prasad Bastola	15,670
CPN (Unified Marxist–Leninist)	Yukta Prasad Bhetwal	15,645
Nepal Sadbhawana Party	Bishwa Nath Singh Rajbanshi	6,748
CPN (Marxist–Leninist)	Radha Krishna Mainali	5,323
Rastriya Prajatantra Party	Ram Kumar Singh Rajbanshi	2,106
Rastriya Janamukti Party	Dhan Bahadur Tamang	1,305
Others		598
Invalid Votes		1,323
Result	Congress hold	
Source: Election Commission

==== 1994 legislative elections ====
Party	Candidate	Votes
Nepali Congress	Chakra Prasad Bastola	13,912
CPN (Unified Marxist–Leninist)	Narayan Singh Rajbanshi	13,668
Nepal Sadbhawana Party	Marguv Alam	8,269
Rastriya Prajatantra Party	Ganesh Prasad Pokharel	3,211
Others		779
Result	Congress gain	
Source: Election Commission

==== 1991 legislative elections ====
Party	Candidate	Votes
CPN (Unified Marxist–Leninist)	Narayan Singh Rajbanshi	15,374
Nepali Congress	Surya Prasad Ganesh	12,901
Result	CPN (UML) gain	

== See also ==
- List of parliamentary constituencies of Nepal
