= Juropani =

Juropani जुरोपानी
- Village
- Location in Nepal
- Coordinates: 26.51°N 87.71°E
- Country: Nepal
- Province: Province No. 1
- District: Jhapa District

Government
  - Type: Juropani VDC

Population (2011)
  - Total: 10,624
  - Total households: 2,166
  - Male population: 5,269
- Time zone: UTC+5:45 (Nepal Time)
- Area code: 023

Juropani (जुरोपानी) is a village development committee of the Jhapa district of Nepal.

Since, 2073 BS this VDC has become Gauradaha Municipality.

== Location ==
It lies on Nepal's southeastern border with India. It is located in the southwestern part of the Jhapa District and bordered by Maharanijhoda VDC in the west, Khajurgachhi and Gaurigunj VDC in the south, Gauradaha VDC in the north, and Korobari and Mahabhara VDC in the east. It is in the Terai of Nepal. There are 9 wards within this village.

== Population ==
At the time of 2011 Nepal census, it had a population of 10,624 with 2,166 living in individual households. The total Male population was 5,269 and the Female population was 5,355. The residents of Juropani are mostly Brahmins, Chhetri, Jaisi, Kumai, Rajbansi and Sataar (Santhaal) among others.

Most of the households are dependent on agriculture and rice is the main crop grown in the area. Other crops are also grown, but in negligible quantity. Most of the Sataar community are landless and they work for other landowners to sustain their livelihoods.

== Market ==
Gwaldubba is a place for the trade in this village. An open-air market called "haat/bazar" conducts every Tuesday and Friday, which serves as a trading venue for local people. The place where the haat operates is called Gwaldubba Bazar.

== Infrastructure ==
- Electricity: Electricity is supplied in almost all of the wards in the village, which is a recent development, however, the quality of electricity is not reliable.
- Telecommunication: Mobiles are the most popular communication device in the area. Probably the entire village owns not more than 10 telephone lines/landlines.
- Drinking Water Supply: The common source of drinking water in the area are tube well and dug well. The water quality is considered drinkable but in some instances high levels of arsenic have been reported in the area.
- Irrigation System: There is one irrigation system in the village but it is not functioning properly. This is due to the lack of budget and irrigation effected people have not been provided with proper solutions of landslide on tunnel. Hence, farmers have to depend on the rain water. Gauria and Ram Chandre are the major streams flowing throughout the village and both are groundwater fed rivers that have more flow during the rainy seasons. Stream path diversion and encroachment has created flooding many times in the past.
- Bridges: Bridge construction has just been completed after a long time since the construction was commenced. It used to create problems to the peoples in rainy season but now they are all relieved and happy with the bridge on both the rivers.
- Others: Only some parts of the village are connected with the bus service. Concerning education sector, colleges and higher secondary schools are now being established in Gwaldubba.
