= Haldibari Rural Municipality =

Haldibari हल्दीबारी गाउँपालिका
- Rural Municipality
- Location in Province No. 1 Haldibari (Nepal)
- Coordinates: 26.50°N 88.01°E
- Province: Province No. 1
- District: Jhapa
- Wards: 5
- Established: 10 March 2017
- Seat: Jalthal

Government
  - Type: Village Council
  - Chairperson: Mr. Rabindra Lingden (RPP)
  - Vice-chairperson: Laxmi Devi Mainali(RPP)

Area
  - Total: 117.34 km^{2} (45.31 sq mi)

Population (2011)
  - Total: 29,223
  - Density: 249.05/km^{2} (645.02/sq mi)
- Time zone: UTC+5:45 (Nepal Standard Time)
- Postal Code: 57204
- Website: official website

Haldibari (Nepali: हल्दीबारी गाउँपालिका) is one of the seven rural municipalities (gaunpalika) located in Jhapa District of Province No. 1 of Nepal. Out of the total 15 municipalities in Jhapa, eight are urban and seven rural.

According to Ministry of Federal Affairs and Local Developme Haldibari has an area of 117.34 square kilometres (45.31 mi^{2}) and the total population of the municipality is 29223 as of Census of Nepal 2011.

Haldibari, Jalthal and Goldhap which previously were all separate Village development committee merged to form this new local level body. Fulfilling the requirement of the new Constitution of Nepal 2015, Ministry of Federal Affairs and Local Development replaced all old VDCs and Municipalities into 753 new local level body (Municipality).

The rural municipality is divided into total 5 wards and the headquarter of this newly formed rural municipality is situated in Jalthal.

== List of Chairman ==
=== Federal Democratic Republic of Nepal (2017–present) ===
No.	Portrait	Chairman	Took office	Left office	Time in office	Party	Election
1	Rabindra Prasad Lingden	Rabindra Prasad Lingden (रविन्द्रप्रसाद लिङदेन)	7 July 2017	incumbent	9 years, 74 days	RPP	2017; 2022
