= Dev Kumar Acharya =

Nepali journalist

- देव कुमार आचार्य
- Born: 26 September 1962; Pelling, Sikkim, India
- Died: 24 July 2002; Jhapa, Nepal
- Cause of death: Assassination
- Education: Mechi Multiple Campus, TU
- Occupations: Journalist, Writer, Teacher
- Years active: 17 years
- Spouse: Yamuna Kharel
- Parents: Chandra Bahadur Acharya (father); Bishnu Maya Acharya (mother)

Dev Kumar Acharya (nickname D Kaudinya; 1962 - 2002) was a Nepali journalist who was killed by the state army during the Armed Conflict in Nepal. Dev Kumar Acharya a resident of Khudunabari in Jhapa District was working as a correspondent for Janadesh Weekly and Janadisha Daily. Acharya was associated with the Arko Bikalpa weekly and had also worked for Swadhin Samwad newspaper. As previous career he had taught in Janata Secondary School, Khudunabari for many years. At the time of his assassination he was also involved in teaching profession as a lecturer in a local campus. Dev Kumar was inclined to the communist politics from early studenthood therefore he was targeted from the police during Panchayat System. He joined Janata Secondary School as primary teacher in 1985. But, he was arrested by police in June 1986 and emprisioned 4 years. He was released after restoration of democracy followed by 1990 Nepalese revolution and resumed the school teaching where he taught English and Math for secondary students.

The active journo used to write a regular column in the Swadhin Samvad weekly published from Jhapa. His articles were frequently published in several magazines and newspapers like Prakash, Jana Awaaz, Mahima, Drishti, Chhalfal and Jwala weekly.

The Royal Nepal Army abducted him from Jhapa on 23 July 2002 with accusation of supporting to the rebel Maoist. He was taken to the Army camp at Charaali Jhapa and tortured nearly 24 hours till his death under the military custody. His dead body was handed over to his family on 24 July.

When the family members found the body in the hospital mortuary, the body was covered by blood and clothes were torn. The family found his corpse that had wide open eyes, several wounds and beaten marks, thumbs and toes skin peeled off and whole body mutilated but there was no sign of bullets fired.

His daughter described the incident in her research paper on the biography, "personality and work of Dev Kumar Acharya (D. Kaundinya), "There were three holes pierced by a bayonet in the chest, it is clear that he died of beating and stabbing”. Government owned media had broadcast the news that Acharya had died in an encounter.

Acharya family faced social ostracism and rape threats after the brutal murder that caused her wife escape away from village with her traumatized under aged kids. Acharya's thought-provoking articles such as 'Huriko Geet' (song of storm), 'Uthaun Jagaun' (wake up), 'Ujyalo Saghaar Ma Uviyeko Dakshin Africa’ (South Africa standing on the bright gateway), ‘Mrityunjali Aagoka Lapka Haru’ (Mrityunjali, the flames of death) published in many newspapers has annoyed the rulers.

Dev Kumar has left behind his 3 kids and wife Yamuna Devi.
