= Khudnabari =

Coordinates: 26°42′N 87°57′E

Khudunabari खुदुनावारी jhapa
- Village Development Committee
- Interactive map of Khudunabari
- Country: Nepal
- Province: Province No. 1
- District: Jhapa District

Population (1991)
  - Total: 20,000
- Time zone: UTC+5:45 (Nepal Time)

Khudunabari is a village development committee in Jhapa District in the Province No. 1 of south-eastern Nepal. At the time of the 1991 Nepal census, it had a population of 10,674 people living in 1867 individual households. It is connected via Sanischare Road to Mahendra Highway. Its neighbouring VDC s are Arjundhara, Lakshmipur and Shantipur of Illam District. It area comprises both plain and hilly. It has a moderate climate.

Khudunabari is one of the developing villages of Jhapa District but the two seasonal rivers Tanting and Biring act as an obstacles as these two rivers usually block the road system during the rainy season. It was a great problem for the people travelling in this route but recently Khudunabari VDC in cooperation with other Govt. Agencies had constructed a bridge over the Biring river bridge over and the Tanting is under construction which is estimate to be completed within 2018 A.D..

Most of the peoples of Khudunabari are farmers and live their livelihood on farming but the youths of this village are very competitive in the field of education. Many youths after their education doing their jobs in different parts of the world with handsome salaries and accommodation. As far as education facilities is concerned, there are three private boarding schools, 5 primary government schools, 2 high schools, 1 higher secondary school and a college. There are many private and non-govt organizations computer institute providing basic computer knowledge. Khudunabari is a small commercial area for local peoples and also for the people of the villages of the neighbouring district Illam as all visit the weekly market for the purchase and sale of daily home needs, food materials, clothes, etc.

Khudunabari has almost all facilities as fixed telephone lines is provided by Nepal Telecom, wireless connections (GSM networks) is being provided by both private and public telecom companies. It also has cable connections for entertainment provided by the local cable networks.

It has an OPD service round the clock provided by the Sub-health Post with Doctors, ambulances and other medical staffs. There are also many pharmacies and Clinics with private medical practitioners.

== Transportation ==
Khudunabari is connected via Sanischare Road to a central highway, the Mahendra Highway which runs throughout the length of the country from east to west. Chandragadhi Airport is located in Chandragadhi (about 25 Kilometers from Khudunabari) and serves 5 to 6 daily flights to and from Kathmandu, the capital of Nepal. Buddha Air, and Yeti Airways are some of the airlines that have daily flights to and from Kathmandu. The primary means of transportation in Khudunabari are jeeps and local buses.

Major Cities Nearby

- Birtamod
- Siliguri, India
- Biratnagar
- Chandragadhi
- Damak
- Kankarbhitta

== Demography ==
Khudunabari has a small population, and the major ethnicities living there are Kumal, Chhettri, Brahmins, Rai, Limbu, Newar, and various others. Majority of the people in Khudunabari are Hindu's and have less numbers Buddhists and Muslims. And it has less population of native people called "kumal". Khudunabari is the name of a small village within the Arjundhara Municipality of the Eastern Province of Nepal. Earlier, Khudunabari Village Development Committee was from Ward No. 1 to Ward No. 9, but now it has been established in Arjundhara Municipality Ward No. 1,2,3. Legend has it that the original Basi Kumal community of this place. From the Khudunabari Kumal language, "khudu" means kodo, and "na" means no / no (kodo does not bear fruit).

== Climate ==
Climate of Khudunabari is very hot and humid during summer, and mild and dry during winter. During the summer, temperatures can reach 40 degree Celsius, and the low in winter is about 12 degree Celsius. Rainfall is abundant during the monsoon season (June–September). There is little or no rainfall during winter, which makes it ideal for harvesting crops such as Rice, Wheat and Mustard. Rice, Wheat, Maize, Potatoes, Mustard, etc. are mainly grown in this area.

== Culture ==
The culture of Khudunabari is a mix of cultures of various ethnicities, but these two festival seasons are the most important (Partly because of Nepal's 88% population being Hindu's).

- Dashain: Dashain is celebrated by the Hindu's and is an exciting time for families to get together and meet relatives and each other. This festival last for 15 days. Celebrations and shopping are common during this time and so are religious ceremonies.
- Tihar and Diwali: Tihar lasts 5 days, and among the days is a day called Laxmi Puja which coincides with Diwali. Diwali is a Hindu festival of lights and colors. People light up their house with little lamps called diya, generally fueled with mustard oil and burst firecrackers all night long during the 5 days of Tihar.

== Past achievements ==
1.Received the first ever Environment Award from the Environment Ministry Office in 2054

2.Development of several nurseries

3. The planting of over 1 million trees

4.Child Education classes. We started nine classes in Khudunabari VDC with 25 illiterate children in each class

5.Strengthening Civil Society Program. In Duhagadhi, Khudunabari and Arjundhara, 24 groups comprising over 900 people were made into three organisations that provided loan facilities and co-operative schemes.
