= Kamal Rural Municipality =

Kamal कमल गाउँपालिका
- Rural Municipality
- Location in Koshi Province Kamal (Nepal)
- Coordinates: 26.60°N 87.75°E
- Province: Koshi Province
- District: Jhapa
- Wards: 7
- Established: 10 March 2017
- Seat: Topgachchi

Government
  - Type: Village Council
  - Chairperson: Mr. Hukum Singh Rai (NC)
  - Vice-chairperson: Mrs. Pramila Neupane Tiwari (CPN-UML)

Area
  - Total: 104.6 km^{2} (40.4 sq mi)

Population (2021)
  - Total: 53,894
  - Density: 515.2/km^{2} (1,334/sq mi)
- Time zone: UTC+5:45 (Nepal Standard Time)
- Website: official website

Kamal (Nepali: कमल गाउँपालिका) is one of the seven rural municipalities (gaunpalika) in Jhapa District, Koshi Province, Nepal. Divided into seven wards, it was established through the merger of the former Topgachchi and Lakhanpur village development committees as part of Nepal's restructuring of local government. According to the 2021 Nepal census, it had a population of 53,894 inhabitants and covers an area of 104.6 square kilometres (40.4 sq mi).

== History ==
Kamal Rural Municipality was formed by the merger of Topgachchi and Lakhanpur, which were previously separate village development committees. This merger was following the requirement of the new Constitution of Nepal to replace all old VDCs with a new structure of rural municipalities (gaupalika) and municipalities (nagarpalika).

== Administration ==
Kamal is divided into seven wards. The administrative headquarters of the rural municipality is located in Kyampa Bazar.

== Demographics ==
According to the 2021 Nepal census, published by the Central Bureau of Statistics, Kamal Rural Municipality had a population of 53,894 inhabitants, an increase from 44,679 recorded in the 2011 Nepal census and 34,530 recorded in the 2001 Nepal census. This represents an average annual population growth rate of 1.8% between 2011 and 2021. The municipality covers an area of 104.6 square kilometres (40.4 mi^{2}), giving it a population density of 515.4 inhabitants per square kilometre.

The 2021 census recorded 25,426 males (47.2%) and 28,468 females (52.8%). In terms of age distribution, 13,379 residents (24.8%) were aged 0–14, 35,583 (66%) were aged 15–64, and 4,932 (9.2%) were aged 65 or older.

Regarding citizenship, 53,816 residents (99.9%) held Nepali citizenship, while 77 held Indian citizenship and one held other citizenships. In terms of place of birth, 25,569 residents (47.5%) were born within Kamal, 5,209 (9.7%) in another municipality in the Jhapa District, 21,069 (39.1%) in another district, and 2,001 (3.7%) in another country.

Among residents aged five and above, 41,666 (83.5%) were recorded as literate, while 99 were able only to read and 8,132 (16.3%) were recorded as unable to read or write.
