= Puhatubari =

Coordinates: 26°37′N 88°04′E

Puhatubari पुहाँतुबारी is a village in Bhadrapur municipality, Jhapa district, Province No. 1, in eastern Nepal.
