= Dharampur, Jhapa =

Dharampur धरमपुर
- Village Development Committee
- Location in Nepal
- Coordinates: 26°35.9408579999′N 87°45.2204879998′E
- Country: Nepal
- Province: Province No. 1
- District: Jhapa District

Population (1991)
  - Total: 14,144
- Time zone: UTC+5:45 (Nepal Time)
- Area code: 023

Dharampur was a village development committee in Jhapa District in the Province No. 1 of south-eastern Nepal. At the time of the 1991 Nepal census it had a population of 14,144. It was later merged with Satasidham, Panchgachhi and Shivaganj to form the Shivasatakshi municipality.
