= Rudra Shekhar Sharma =

Rudra Shekhar Sharma रुद्र शेखर शर्मा
- Born: May 18, 1989 (age 36); Jhapa Nepal
- Origin: Nepal
- Genres: Modern & Ghazal
- Occupation: Singer
- Instrument: Guitar
- Years active: Present
- Member of: Aawaj International LLC, Film artist workers organization of Nepal(FAWON)
- Website: rssharma.com.np

Rudra Shekhar Sharma (Nepali: रुद्र शेखर शर्मा ) is a Nepalese modern and Ghazal genre singer. He was born in Jhapa District, Nepal. Sharma started his musical journey around 2009. "Dukhdina Ma", "Kina", "K Hola Bholi", "Timi Bhanchhau Jun Ramro" and "Jeena Abhi Baki Hai" are some popular songs in his musical journey. He has been awarded different national awards, including the Rapti Music Award.

== Award ==
SN	Award Title	Award Category	Notable Work	Result	Ref
1	4th Rapti Music Award - 2018	Best Debut singer	Dukhdina Ma	won	
2	7th NIM Award - 2024	Best Ghazal Singer	Kina - Song	won	
3	7th Music Khabar Music Award - 2018	Best Album	Rupum - Song Album	nominate	
4	5th Genius Music Award - 2024	Best Singer	K hola bholi - Song	won	

== Songs ==
SN	Songs Name	Genre	Ref
1	Maile Chheke	Modern	
2	Dhukdina Ma		
3	Jaha Tikha Kada		
4	Bebarise hunuparne laasai huda pani	Movie Song	
5	Timi Bhanchau Juna ramro		
6	Rupam		
7	Devduta hau timi		
8	Take me back		
9	Mirtukosh		
