= Sanischare =

Sanischare may refer to:

- Sanischare, Kosi, Nepal
- Sanischare, Mechi, Nepal
