= Shivaganj =

Shivganj शिवगंज
- Village development committee
- Location in Nepal
- Coordinates: 26.59°N 87.84°E
- Country: Nepal
- Province: Province No. 1
- District: Jhapa District

Population (1991)
  - Total: 13,619
- Time zone: UTC+5:45 (Nepal Time)
- Postal code: 57213
- Area code: 023

Shivganj was a village development committee in Jhapa District in the Province No. 1 of south-eastern Nepal. At the time of the 1991 Nepal census it had a population of 13,619 people living in 2,490 individual households. It was later merged with Satasidham, Dharampur, and Panchgachhi to form the Shivasatakshi municipality.
