= Baniyatol =

Baniyatol बनियाटोल Aaratinagar
- Village
- Motto: Let's achieve the development
- Location in Nepal
- Coordinates: 26.52°N 87.65°E
- Country: Nepal
- Zone: Mechi Zone
- District: Jhapa District
- Village Development Committee: Kohabara

Population (2011)
  - Total: approx. 100
  - Major Ethnicities: Brahmin and Chhetri
- Time zone: UTC+5:45 (Nepal Time)
- Area code: 023

Baniyatol is a village in Kohabara VDC, Jhapa District in the Mechi Zone of south-eastern Nepal. It is one of the most developed village in Kohabara VDC. As estimated in 2011, it had a population of approx. 100 people living in their own house.

== Population ==
The total estimated population of this village is approximately 100 in 2011 AD. People living here are mostly Brahmin and Chhetri. Nepali is used as a lingua franca in this village and Rajbanshi and other regional languages are spoken by people here. Hinduism is practiced by almost all people here and the number of people following Christianity is increasing among some Madhesi community.

== Infrastructures ==
- Gravelled roads are the only means of transportation in this village. The village is the final station for the only bus that regularly travels here.
- Health services like hospitals and health posts are not available at all. People have to depend upon nearby VDC for medical treatment.
- Only one government school is available in the village.
- Wireless communication is available in whole village. However, cable is not available here.
- Electricity is available here which was joined several years ago

== Religious view ==
The village has been a major attraction for many pilgrims from far VDCs. A large Hindu temple has been constructed here, offering facilities for religious ceremonies like Puran, marriage, Bratabandha and others. Every year, Puran is organized by locals in this village also.
