= Purna Prasad Rajbansi =

Nepali politician

Purna Prasad Rajbanshi
- पूर्णप्रसाद राजबंशी

Member of the Koshi Provincial Assembly
- In office 5 February 2018 – 18 September 2022
- Preceded by: Constitution created
- Succeeded by: Chabilal Chudal
- Constituency: Jhapa 3 (B)

Member of the House of Representatives
- In office 2008–2009
- President: Ram Baran Yadav
- Prime Minister: Pushpa Kamal Dahal
- Preceded by: Narendra Bikram Limbu
- Succeeded by: Krishna Prasad Sitaula
- Constituency: Jhapa 3

Personal details
- Born: Haldibari, Jhapa
- Party: Communist Party of Nepal (Maoist Centre)

Purna Prasad Rajbanshi (Nepali: पूर्णप्रसाद राजबंशी) is a Nepalese politician, belonging to the Communist Party of Nepal (Maoist Centre) (CPN[M]). In April 2008, as a member of the CPN(M) party, at that time known as the Communist Party of Nepal (Maoist), he won the Jhapa-3 seat in the Constituent Assembly election with 16685 votes, defeating the Home Minister Krishna Prasad Sitaula. Some time after 2009, in the breakup and merging of various communist parties in Nepal, he was a member of the Unified Communist Party of Nepal (Maoist). This party later merged with other breakaway and minor parties and reunified as the Communist Party of Nepal (Maoist Centre) in 2016.
