= Bhumi Prasad Rajbanshi =

Nepalese politician (born 1965)

Honourable Bhumi Prasad Rajbanshi
- भूमिप्रसाद राजवंशी

Minister of State for Physical Infrastructure Development of Koshi Province
- In office 13 September 2024 – 6 January 2026
- Governor: Parshuram Khapung
- Chief Minister: Hikmat Kumar Karki
- Preceded by: Ambir Babu Gurung
- Succeeded by: Shobha Chemjong

Member of the Koshi Provincial Assembly
- Incumbent
- Assumed office 26 December 2022
- Constituency: Jhapa 3 (A)

Personal details
- Born: 21 September 1965 (age 60) Jhapa District, Nepal
- Party: Nepali Congress

Bhumi Prasad Rajbanshi (Nepali: भूमिप्रसाद राजवंशी) is a Nepalese politician and member of the Nepali Congress Party. Rajbanshi had served as the Minister of State for Physical Infrastructure Development of Koshi Province. He also serves as a member of the Koshi Provincial Assembly and was elected from Jhapa 3 (A) constituency.

== Electoral history ==
=== 2022 provincial elections ===
==== Jhapa 3(A) ====
Candidate	Party	Votes	%
Bhumi Prasad Rajbanshi	Nepali Congress	20,770	47.79
Bashant Kumar Baniya	CPN (UML)	19,701	45.33
Madanhang Tawa Limbu	Mongol National Organisation	1,117	2.57
Others	1,872	4.31	
Total		43,460	100.00
Majority		1,069	
Nepali Congress			
Source: Election Commission
