= Haldibari =

Haldibari may refer to:

- Haldibari (community development block), West Bengal, India
- Haldibari, India, a city in West Bengal, India
- Haldibari, Nepal, a village development committee
