= Barhadashi Rural Municipality =

Rural Municipality in Province No. 1, Nepal

Bahradashi बाह्रदशी गाउँपालिका
- Rural Municipality
- Flag

- Location in Province No. 1 Bahradashi (Nepal)
- Coordinates: 26.55°N 87.92°E
- Country: Nepal
- Province: Province No. 1
- District: Jhapa

Government
  - Chairperson: Mr. Devindra Prasad Chamlagain (CPN-UML)
  - Vice-chairperson: Mrs. Santa Devi Siwakoti(kharel) (CPN-UML)

Area
  - Total: 88.44 km^{2} (34.15 sq mi)
- Elevation: 340 m (1,120 ft)

Population (2011)
  - Total: 33,653
  - Density: 380.5/km^{2} (985.5/sq mi)
- Time zone: UTC+5:45 (Nepal Standard Time)
- Postal Code: 57205
- Area code: 023
- Website: official website

Bahradashi (Nepali: बाह्रदशी गाउँपालिका) is one of the seven rural municipalities (gaunpalika) located in Jhapa District of Province No. 1, Nepal. Out of the total 15 municipalities in Jhapa, eight are urban and seven are rural.

According to Ministry of Federal Affairs and Local Developme, Jhapa has an area of 88.44 square kilometres (34.15 mi^{2}) and the total population of the municipality is 33653 as of Census of Nepal 2011.

Rajgadh, Chakchaki and Dangibari which previously were all separate Village development committee merged to form this new local level body. Fulfilling the requirement of the new Constitution of Nepal 2015, Ministry of Federal Affairs and Local Development replaced all old VDCs and Municipalities into 753 new local level body (Municipality).

The rural municipality is divided into total 7 wards and the headquarter of this newly formed rural municipality is situated in Chakchaki.

== List of Chairman ==
=== Federal Democratic Republic of Nepal (2017–present) ===
No.	Portrait	Chairman	Took office	Left office	Time in office	Party	Election
1	Khadga Prasad Rajbanshi	Khadga Prasad Rajbanshi (खड्गप्रसाद राजवंशी)	9 July 2017	6 May 2022	4 years, 301 days	Congress	2017
2	Devindra Prasad Chamlagain	Devindra Prasad Chamlagain (देवीन्द्रप्रसाद चम्लागाई)	20 May 2022	incumbent	4 years, 123 days	CPN (UML)	2022
