= Hattikilla =

Hattikilla हात्तिकिल्ला
- village
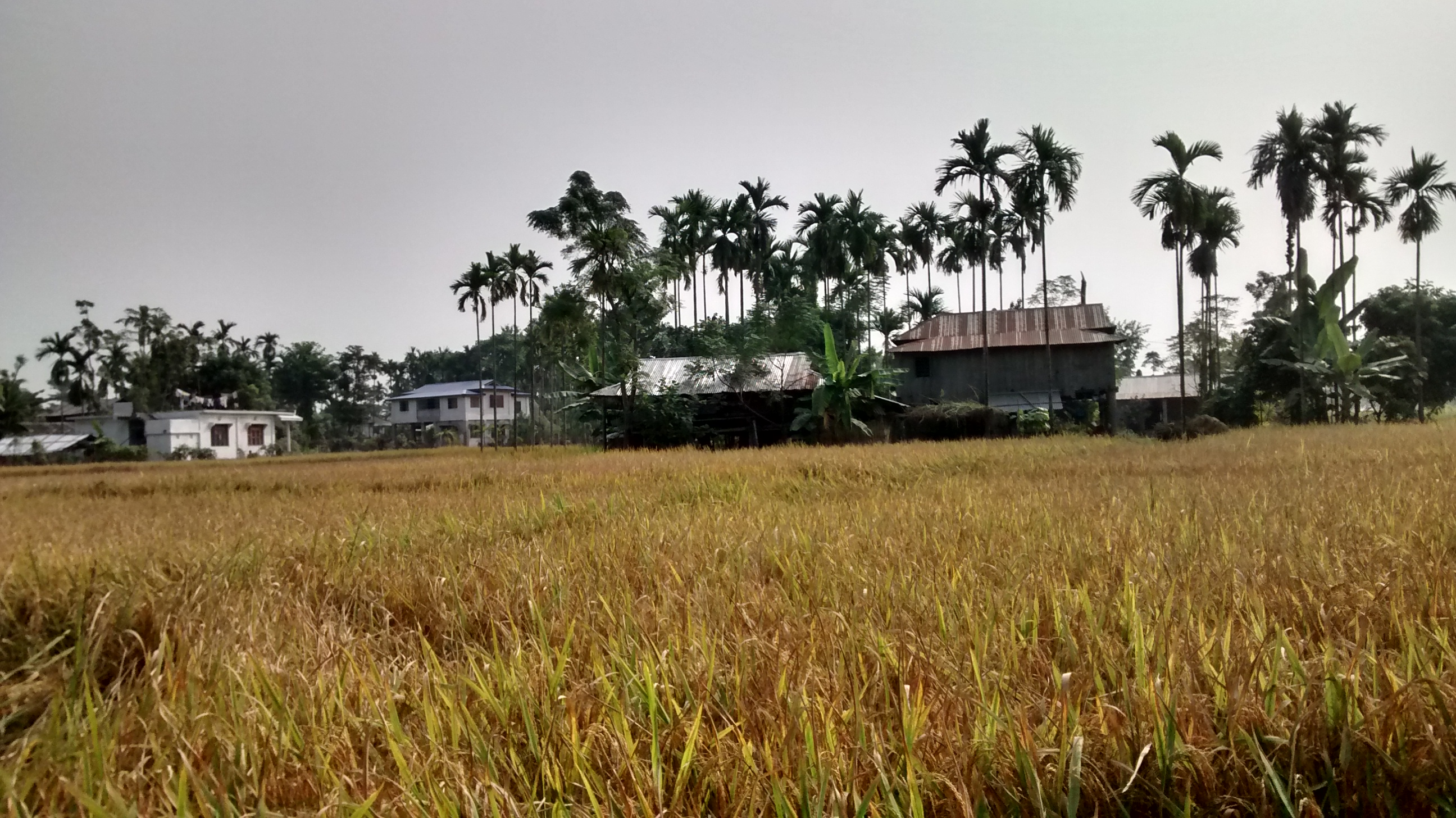
- Rice field with houses in Hattikilla

- Location of in Nepal
- Coordinates: 26.697859°N 87.994729°E
- Country: Nepal
- Zone: Mechi
- District: Jhapa
- Time zone: UTC+5:45 (NST)
- Postal Code: 57205
- Area code: 023

Hattikilla (Hatti: Elephant, Killa: Fort) (Nepali: हात्तिकिल्ला, pronounced: /haːt̪t̪ikɪlːa/) is a village located in the Arjundhara Municipality of Jhapa District in eastern Nepal.

== History ==
The village derives its name from the dense jungle that once covered the area, which was home to a significant population of elephants. Over time, the region saw an increase in human settlement, leading to the gradual transformation of the landscape.

== Economy ==
Like many villages in Nepal, the primary occupation in Hattikilla is agriculture. The main crops cultivated are maize and paddy, along with a variety of vegetables and cash crops, including mustard, sugarcane, and tea. Livestock such as cows, buffaloes, and goats are also raised by the local population. While a limited number of residents are employed in the service sector, many young individuals seek work abroad in countries such as Malaysia, Qatar, the UAE, Kuwait, and Saudi Arabia. Additionally, rubber plants and pineapples are grown in the area, and the locally harvested tea is processed onsite.

== Climate ==
Hattikilla experiences a subtropical monsoon climate. Summers are characterized by hot and humid conditions, while winters and springs are typically dry and warm. Temperatures in the village range from 40 °C to 8 °C, with an average of 20 °C to 28 °C. Rainfall is influenced by clouds carried by winds originating from the Bay Of Bengal.
