= Gauradaha Municipality =

Gauradaha गौरादह
- Nickname: NepalJhapaDistrictmap.png -->
- Location in Koshi Province jhapa Gauradaha (Nepal)
- Coordinates: 26.56°N 87.72°E
- Country: Nepal
- Province: Koshi
- District: Jhapa

Government
  - Mayor: Chattrapati Subedi (UML)
  - Deputy Mayor: Jalbarsha Rajbanshi (UML)

Population (2021)
  - Total: 60,451
- Time zone: UTC+5:45 (NST)
- Postal code: 57216
- Area code: 023
- Website: gauradahamun.gov.np

Gauradaha is a municipality in Jhapa District in Province No. 1 of eastern Nepal. After the government announcement the municipality was established on 19 September 2015 by merging the existing Maharanijhoda, Baigundhura, Juropani, Kohabara and Gauradaha village development committees (VDCs). The center of the municipality is established in the mid of Gauradaha, Dhobiniya Chowk. At the time of the 2021 Nepal census, after merging the four VDCs population it had a total population of 47,393 persons. After the government decision, the number of municipalities reached 217 in Nepal.
