= Lal Prasad Sawa Limbu =

Nepali politician

- लाल प्रसाद सावाँ लिम्बु

Member of Parliament, Pratinidhi Sabha
- Incumbent
- Assumed office 4 March 2018
- Preceded by: Prem Bahadur Giri
- Succeeded by: Shambhu Prasad Dhakal
- Constituency: Jhapa 4

Personal details
- Born: 11 July 1967 (age 58)
- Party: CPN UML

Lal Prasad Sawa Limbu is a Nepali politician and a member of the House of Representatives of the federal parliament of Nepal. This is the first time he has been elected to parliament. He was elected from Jhapa-4 constituency under the first-past-the-post system representing CPN UML of the left alliance. He received 43,515 votes. He defeated his nearest rival Deuman Thebe of Nepali Congress who received 26,822 votes.
