= Panchgachhi =

Coordinates: 26°34′N 87°50′E

Panchganchi पाँचगाछी
- Village development committee
- Interactive map of Panchganchi
- Country: Nepal
- Province: Province No. 1
- District: Jhapa District

Population (2012)
  - Total: 16,600
- Time zone: UTC+5:45 (Nepal Time)
- Area code: 023

Panchganchi was a village development committee in Jhapa District in the Province No. 1 of south-eastern Nepal. At the time of the 2011 Nepal census it had a population of 16600 people living in 2207 individual households. It was later merged with Satasidham, Dharampur, and Shivaganj to form the Shivasatakshi municipality.
