= Dharmashila Chapagain =

Nepali politician

- धर्मशीला चापागाईं

Member of Parliament, Pratnidhi Sabha for CPN (Maoist Centre) party list
- Incumbent
- Assumed office 4 March 2018

Member of Constituent Assembly
- In office 28 May 2008 – 28 May 2012
- Preceded by: Chakra Prasad Bastola
- Succeeded by: Prem Bahadur Giri
- Constituency: Jhapa 4

Personal details
- Born: 18 January 1973 (age 53) Jhapa District
- Party: CPN (Maoist Centre)

Dharmashila Chapagain (Nepali: धर्मशीला चापागाईं) is a Nepalese politician, belonging to the Communist Party of Nepal (Maoist Centre) [CPN(M)]. In January 2007 she was nominated to the interim legislature of Nepal on behalf of the CPN(M). In April 2008, she won the Jhapa-4 seat in the Constituent Assembly election with 19,289 votes.

In 2011, she served as the Minister of State for Health and Population.
