= Jhapa Rural Municipality =

Jhapa झापा गाउँपालिका
- Rural Municipality
- Location in Province No. 1 Jhapa (Nepal)
- Coordinates: 26.5039°N 87.8696°E
- Province: Koshi Province
- District: Jhapa
- Wards: 7
- Established: 10 March 2017
- Seat: Taganduba

Government
  - Type: Village Council
  - Chairperson: Mr. Jayanarayan Shah (NC)
  - Vice Chairperson: Mrs. Anju Devi Thapaliya (NC)

Area
  - Total: 94.12 km^{2} (36.34 sq mi)

Population (2011)
  - Total: 34,601
  - Density: 367.6/km^{2} (952.1/sq mi)
- Time zone: UTC+5:45 (Nepal Standard Time)
- Website: official website

Jhapa (Nepali: झापा गाउँपालिका) is one of the seven rural municipalities (gaunpalika) located in Jhapa District of Koshi Province of Nepal. Out of Jhapa's total 15 municipalities, eight are urban and seven are rural.

According to Ministry of Federal Affairs and Local Developme Jhapa has an area of 94.12 square kilometres (36.34 mi^{2}) and the total population of the municipality is 34601 as of Census of Nepal 2011.

Kumarkhod, Taganduba and Sharanamati which previously were all separate Village development committee merged to form this new local level body. Fulfilling the requirement of the new Constitution of Nepal 2015, Ministry of Federal Affairs and Local Development replaced all old VDCs and Municipalities into 753 new local level body (Municipality).

The rural municipality is divided into total 7 wards and the headquarter of this newly formed rural municipality is situated in Taganduba.
