= Taganduba =

Coordinates: 26°28′N 87°52′E

Taganduba टाघनडुब्बा
- Village development committee
- Interactive map of Taganduba
- Country: Nepal
- Province: Province No. 1
- District: Jhapa District

Population (1991)
  - Total: 2,627
- Time zone: UTC+5:45 (Nepal Time)

Taganduba is a village development committee in Jhapa District in the Province No. 1 of south-eastern Nepal. In the 1991 Nepal census, it had a population of 2,627 people living in 1,513 individual households.
