= Topgachchi =

Village development committee in Nepal

Topgachchi तोपगाछी
- Village development committee
- Location in Nepal
- Coordinates: 26.60°N 87.75°E
- Country: Nepal
- Province: Province No. 1
- District: Jhapa District

Population (1991)
  - Total: 23,290
- Time zone: UTC+5:45 (Nepal Time)
- Postal code: 57214
- Area code: 023

Topgachchi is a village development committee in Jhapa District in the Province No. 1 of south-eastern Nepal. At the time of the 1991 Nepal census it had a population of 23,290 living in 4,199 households.
