= Dangibari =

Dangibari डाँगीबारी
- Village development committee
- Location in Nepal
- Coordinates: 26.58°N 87.93°E
- Country: Nepal
- Province: Province No. 1
- District: Jhapa District

Population (1991)
  - Total: 7,472
- Time zone: UTC+5:45 (Nepal Time)

Dangibari is a village development committee in Jhapa District in the Province No. 1 of south-eastern Nepal. At the time of the 1991 Nepal census it had a population of 7472.

It borders with Ghaliadubba, Charpane, Garamani, Chakchaki, Saranamati and Surunga VDCs. It is divided to 9 wards. The predominant caste is Brahman, Kshetri, Rajbanshi, limbu Santhal among others. Basic infrastructural development is satisfactory here including school, roads, electricity, drinking water and irrigation. A major fraction of alluvial fertile land of Jhapa lies here. Various notable figures in National politics and bureaucracy belongs to this place. A major tourist and historical religious site Barhadashi (kuti danda) lies at 8th ward of this VDC.
