= Kohabara =

Kohabara कोहवरा
- Village development committee
- Location in Nepal
- Coordinates: 26.51°N 87.66°E
- Country: Nepal
- Province: Province No. 1
- District: Jhapa District

Population (2011)
  - Total: 10,326
  - Major Ethnicities: Brahmin and Chhetri
- Time zone: UTC+5:45 (Nepal Time)
- Area code: 023
- ISO 3166 code: NPL

Kohabara is a village development committee in Jhapa District in Province No. 1 of southeastern Nepal. The RamChandre Khola, a stream, separates it from Khajurgachhi VDC.

== Population ==
Major ethnicities includes Brahmin and Chhetri and Nepali is a major language in Kohabara. According to the 2011 Nepal census, it had a population of 10,326. Baniyatol is a notable village in this VDC which is more developed compared to nearby villages.
