= Shambhu Prasad Dhakal =

Nepalese Politician

- शम्भुप्रसाद ढकाल

Member of Parliament, Pratinidhi Sabha
- Incumbent
- Assumed office 26 March 2026
- Preceded by: Lal Prasad Sawa Limbu
- Constituency: Jhapa 4

Personal details
- Citizenship: Nepalese
- Party: Rastriya Swatantra Party
- Education: Political Science (MA)
- Profession: Politician; Inspector

Shambhu Prasad Dhakal (Note: Nepali: शम्भुप्रसाद ढकाल) is a Nepalese politician serving as a member of parliament from the Rastriya Swatantra Party. He is the member of the 7th Pratinidhi Sabha elected from Jhapa 4 constituency in 2026 Nepalese General Election, where he secured 43,631 votes and defeated Lal Prasad Sawa Limbu of the CPN UML. He served as an Inspector General in the Nepal Police before entering politics. He holds a master's degree in political science.
