= Prakash Pathak =

Nepalese Politician

- प्रकाश पाठक

Member of the House of Representatives
- Incumbent
- Assumed office 26 March 2026
- Preceded by: Rajendra Prasad Lingden
- Constituency: Jhapa 3

Personal details
- Citizenship: Nepalese
- Party: Rastriya Swatantra Party
- Education: Tribhuvan University (Bachelor Degree)
- Profession: Politician; Journalist

Prakash Pathak (Note: Nepali: प्रकाश पाठक) is a Nepalese politician serving as a member of parliament from the Rastriya Swatantra Party. He is the member of the 3rd Federal Parliament of Nepal elected from Jhapa 3 constituency in 2026 Nepalese General Election securing 38,674 votes and defeating Rajendra Lingden, the chairman of the Rastriya Prajatantra Party with a huge margin. He was a senior sub-editor at Galaxy 4K Television, Radio Kantipur, and a news producer at Radio Annapurna.

== Political career ==
In August 2026, Pathak proposed re-establishing the death penalty for convicted rapists and murderers.
