= Arjundhara Dham =

Hindu pilgrimage site in Nepal

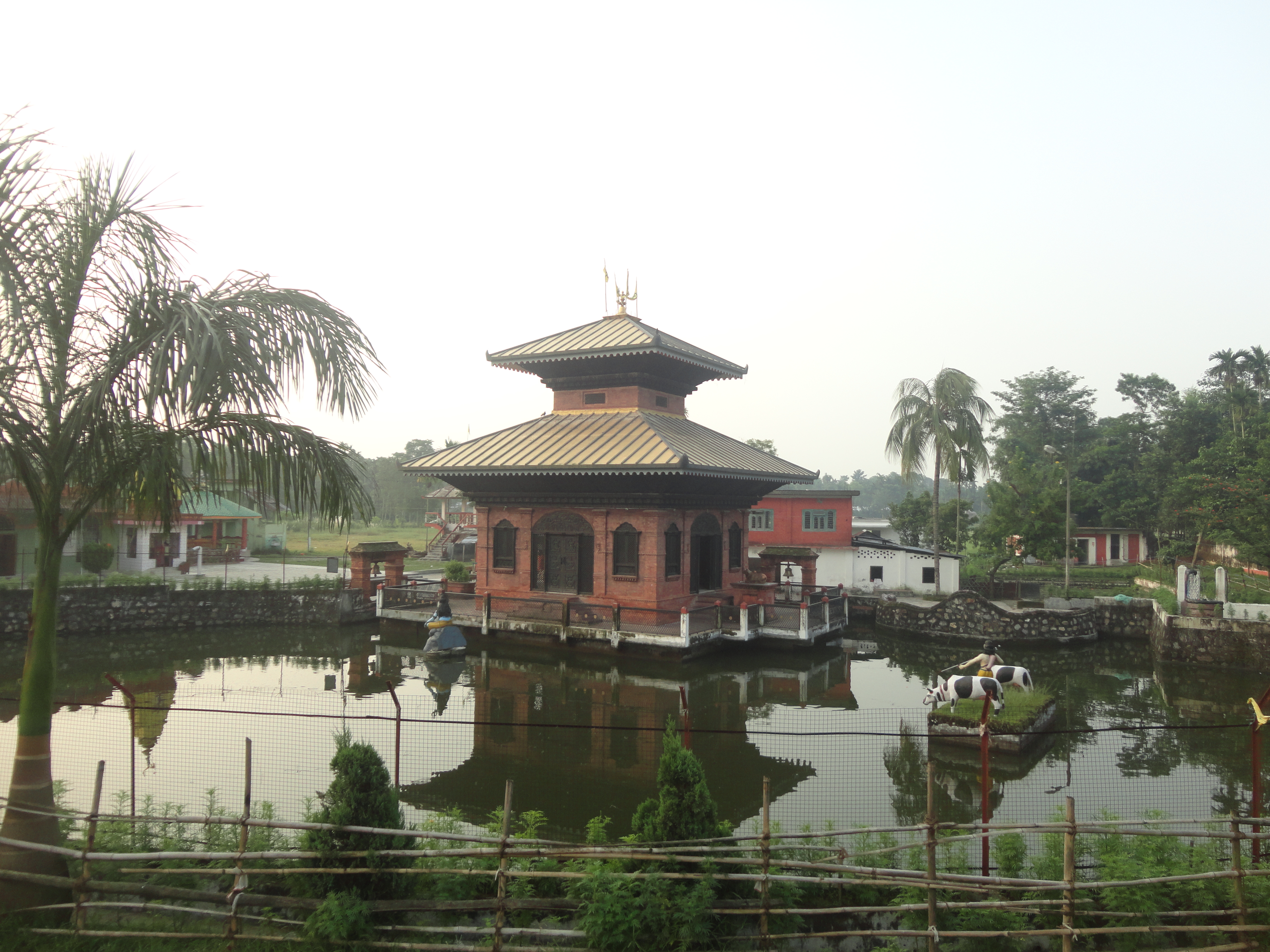
- Front view of Arjundhara Dham

- Location within Nepal

Religion
- Affiliation: Hinduism
- District: Jhapa
- Province: Koshi
- Festivals: Shravana, Balachaturdasi and Maha Shivaratri

Location
- Country: Nepal
- Interactive map of Arjundhara Dham
- Coordinates: 26.6855°N 87.9896°E

Architecture
- Type: Pagoda

Arjundhara is the name of a temple that is situated in south-eastern part of Nepal. It is situated in Jhapa district, Province No. 1 in Nepal. It is 45 minutes on flight from Kathmandu to Bhadrapur and 30 minutes car ride from Bhadrapur to Arjundhara. It is 6 km north from the business centre Birtamode, Previously it used to be in Arjundhara VDC ward no. 04. and now it lies in Arjundhara Municipality. As Nepal is recently divided into provinces this place lies in the Province no.01.

== Legend ==
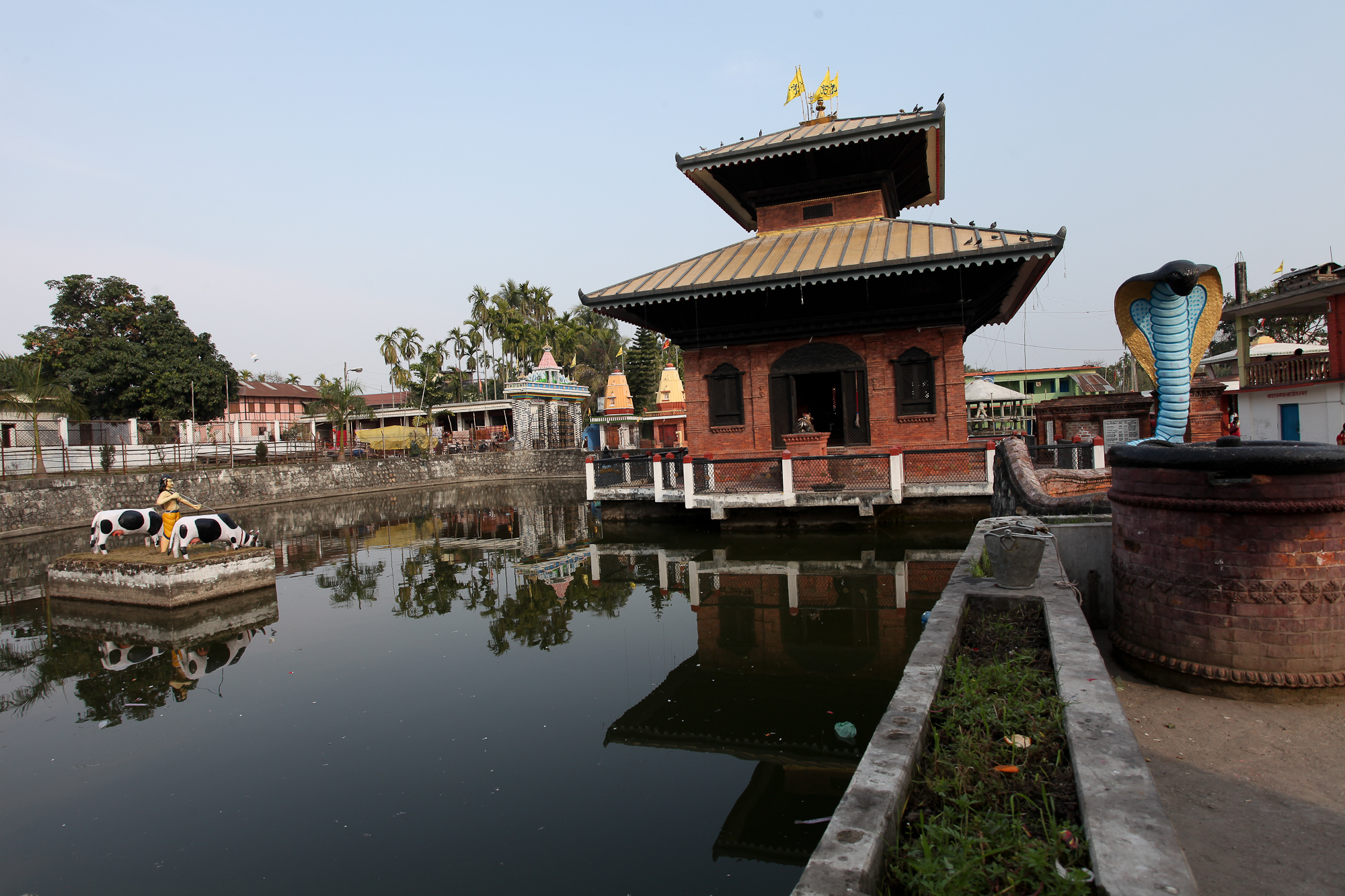
Arjun Dhara Temple

Arjuna is the name of a Mahabharata character, while 'dhara' refers to a source of water. In the epic, after the Pandavas completed their 12 years of exile at the forest, they had to live 2 years hiding their identity before returning to their kingdom. The princes lived at King Virata's palace, hiding their identity. The Kauravas suspected where they stayed, and so they stole all the cows that belonged to Virata so as to compel the Pandavas to reveal their identity. The Pandavas set out in search of the cows, which they are regionally regarded to have found in the place which is now called 'Garuva'. When the Pandavas were returning the cows from the garuva, the cows felt thirsty. Arjuna is said to have immediately pulled out his arrow named Pagnakhestra and struck the ground from where water burst out from the ground and the cows quenched their thirst.

According to local tradition, a female ascetic named Khadebaba is said to have discovered this place and its significance.

The environs of this regions has a gurukul for the Brahmanas, as well as a cow farm. There are also the statues of different gods such as Shiva and Hanuman.
