= Maharanijhoda =

Maharanijhoda महारानीझोडा
- Village development committee
- Location in Nepal
- Coordinates: 26.56°N 87.68°E
- Country: Nepal
- Province: Province No. 1
- District: Jhapa District

Population (2001)
  - Total: 15,743
- Time zone: UTC+5:45 (Nepal Time)

Maharanijhoda is a village development committee (VDC) in Jhapa District in Province No. 1 of southeastern Nepal. At the time of the 1991 Nepal census, it had a population of 10,743 people living in 1811 individual households. There are mainly Brahman, Chetris living in this VDC. Maharanijhoda VDC consists of 9 wards. The major occupation of the people of Maharanijhoda is farming.
