= Arjundhara Municipality =

Municipality in Koshi Province, Nepal

Arjundhara अर्जुनधारा
- Municipality
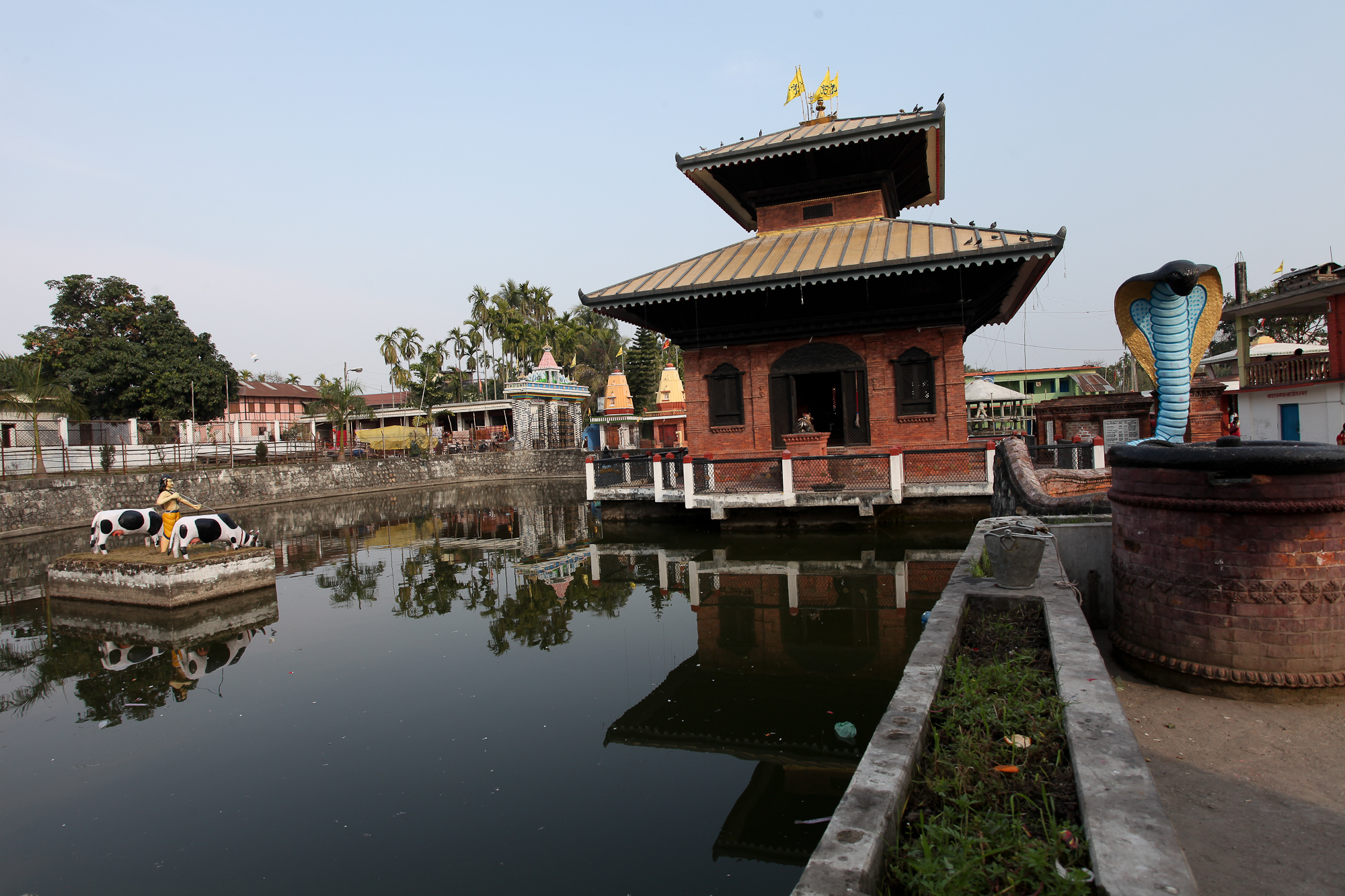
- Arjundhara Dham

- Location within Koshi Province Location within Nepal
- Coordinates: 26.685052°N 87.99136°E
- Country: Nepal
- Province: Koshi
- District: Jhapa

Government
  - Mayor: Baldevsingh Gomden Tamang(CPN UML)
  - Deputy Mayor: Khadga Maya Parajuli (CPN UML)

Population (2021)
  - Total: 84,018
- Time zone: UTC+5:45 (NST)
- Postal Code: 57200
- Area code: 023
- Website: official website

Arjundhara (Nepali: अर्जुनधारा) is a municipality in Jhapa District of Province No. 1 in Eastern Nepal. It was formed in 2014 by merging the former village development committees Arjundhara, Shanischare, and Khudunabari. Initially named Shani-Arjun, it was renamed to Arjundhara in January 2017, after Arjundhara Temple situated here. At the 2021 Nepal census, it had a population of 84,018 people living in 20,935 individual households.

== History ==
The ancient temple, steeped in the lore of the Mahabharata, bears witness to a brief yet profound moment in history. Within its sacred confines lies a pond, a testament to a pivotal event from the epic tale. Legend has it that during the exile of the Pandavas, as they traversed the unforgiving wilderness, Arjuna, moved by the plight of a parched cow, unleashed an arrow that struck the earth, conjuring forth a spring of life-giving water. This oasis became known as Arjundhara, a name immortalizing the selfless act of the noble warrior.

In more recent times, the villages of Arjundhara and Sanischare converged to form the Arjundhara Municipality in 2017, marking a new chapter in their shared history.

Sanischare/Arjundhara served as the initial home for the Dhakal family when they relocated from the nearby hills, particularly Namsaling in Ilam, to the plains. Jaya Prasad Dhakal, the son of Abhinarayan Dhakal, emerged as a prominent figure in this area. In his later years, he dedicated a significant portion of his time to writing and critically analyzing Nepali literature. Notably, he adhered to a pragmatic approach and drew inspiration from Postmodern literature in his work.

Furthermore, it's worth mentioning that Sanischare, now known as Arjundhara, held a distinct honor as the first location in all of Nepal to establish a fruit canning factory during the 1960s. This pioneering venture was owned by Jaya Prasad Dhakal, who later spearheaded rubber plantation initiatives in Nepal.

In the 1960s and 1970s, Sanischare enjoyed a reputation as an industrious hub. However, challenges such as inflation and natural disasters, particularly flooding, briefly dampened its aspirations for growth and development.

Presently, Sanischare is experiencing a steady increase in population, particularly as it merges with Arjundhara, and strives to evolve into a progressive municipality, both in terms of politics and socio-economic reforms. Current mayor of Arjundhara Municipality is Baldev Singh Gomden Tamang.
