= Shivasatakshi Municipality =

Shivasatakshi शिवसताक्षी
- Municipality (नगरपालिका)
- Location in Province No. 1 Shivasatakshi (Nepal)
- Coordinates (Shivasatakshi): 26°36′55″N 87°50′07″E
- Country: Nepal
- Province: Koshi Province
- District: Jhapa
- No. of Wards: 11

Government
  - Type: Mayor–council government
  - Mayor: Megahang Thopra (Roshan) (CPN(UML))
  - Deputy Mayor: Naramaya Karki (CPN(UML))

Area
  - Total: 145.48 km^{2} (56.17 sq mi)
- Elevation: 100 m (330 ft)

Population (2019 household survey)
  - Total: 74,366
  - Density: 511.18/km^{2} (1,323.9/sq mi)
- Time zone: UTC+5:45 (Nepal Time)
- Area code: +977-023
- Website: shivasatakshimun.gov.np

Shivasatakshi is a municipality in the southeastern part of Jhapa District in the Koshi Province of eastern Nepal. The municipality was formed by merging four existing VDCs—Shivaganj, Satasidham, Dharampur, and Panchgachhi—on 2 Dec 2014. The headquarter of the municipality is in the former Satasidham village development committee (VDC).

== Population ==
At the time of the 2011 Nepal Census, Shivaganj and Satasidham had population of 13,518 and 26,171 people living in 9,102 individual households. After the VDCs of Shivaganj, Satasidham, Panchgachhi and Dharampur were merged, it had a total population of 74,366 people .

== Occupation ==
Agriculture is the main source of income of majority of people residing in Shivasatakshi.

== Geography ==
Shivasatakshi municipality lies in the Terai region. It is bordered by Kankai municipality in the east, Kamal VDC in the west, Ilam district in the north, and Gauriganj in the south.

There is plain land and evergreen forest. It lies in the middle part of Jhapa District. Due to its plain and fertile land it has high capability for agricultural production. Heavy rainfall occurs in this area during the summer season.

== Healthcare ==
Healthcare in Shivasatakshi is not very well-developed. The absence of modern hospitals often necessitates the residents to travel to Damak, or Birtamod in case of a serious health issue.

== Education ==
Alike healthcare, the education services in Shivasatakshi are limited to undergrad level only. There are only handful of high-schools and very few colleges that teach upto Bachelors' level. As a result students have to go to either Damak or Birtamode for higher education.

== Gallery ==
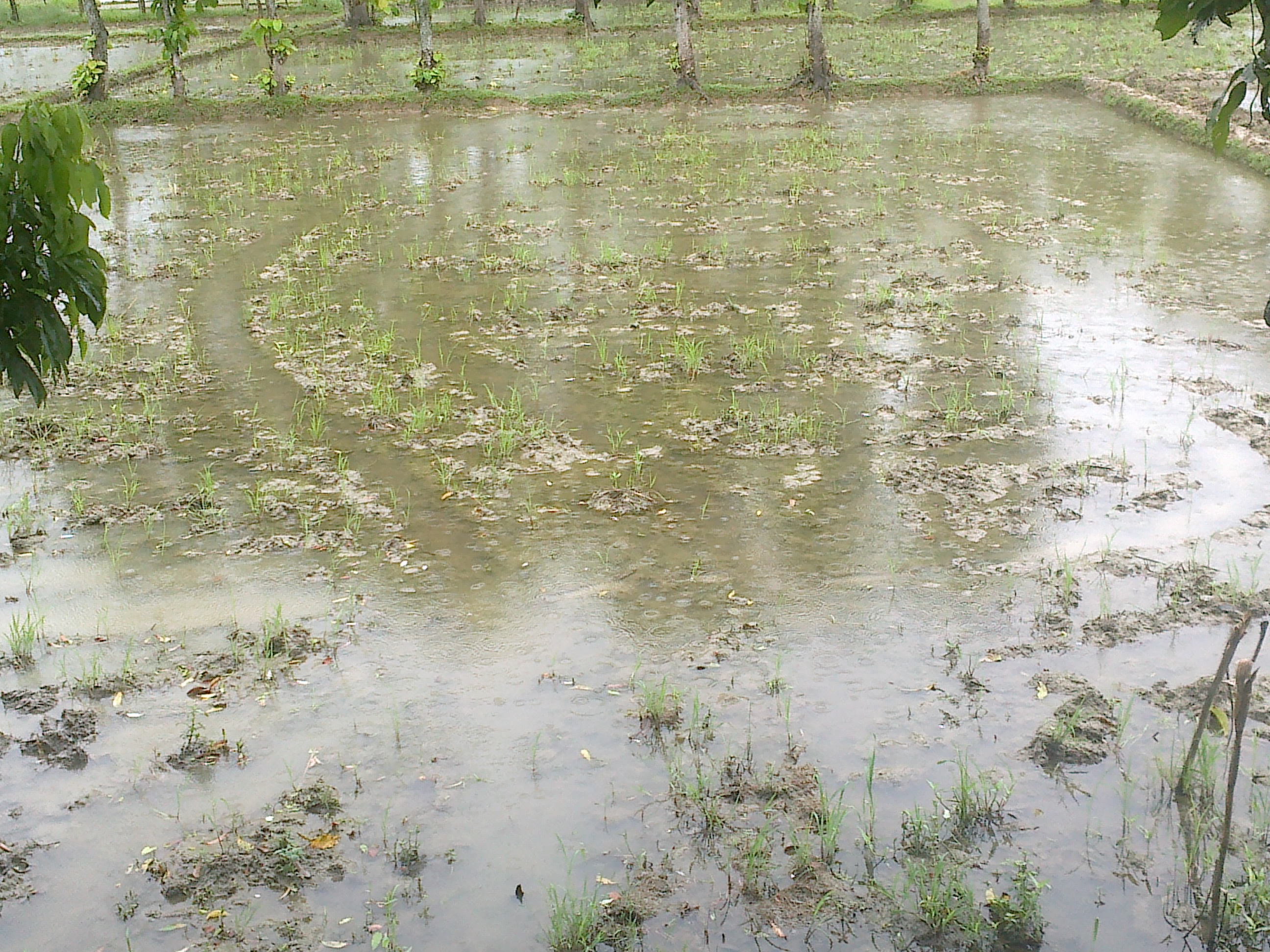
Farmland for paddy production

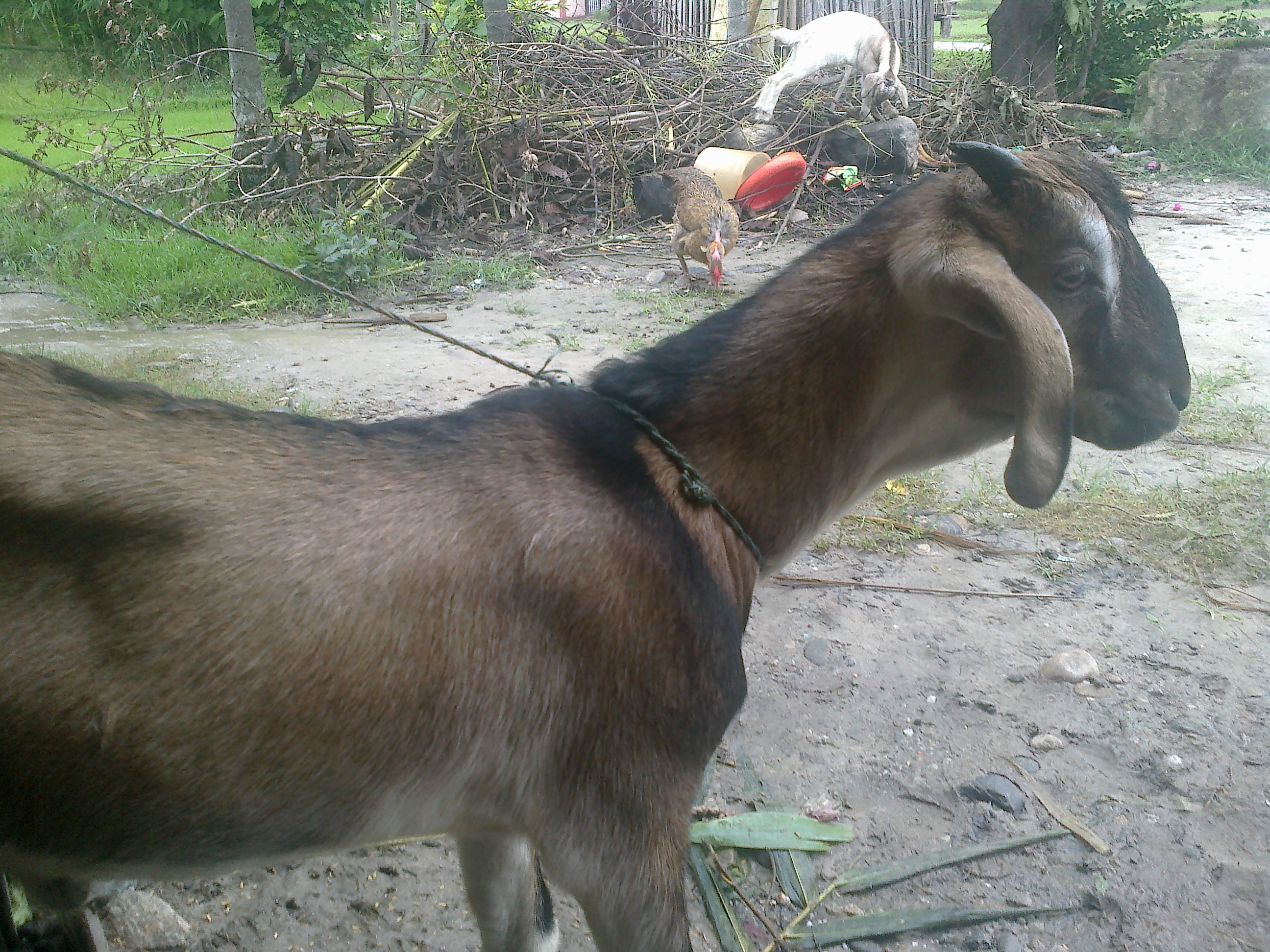
Animal husbandry

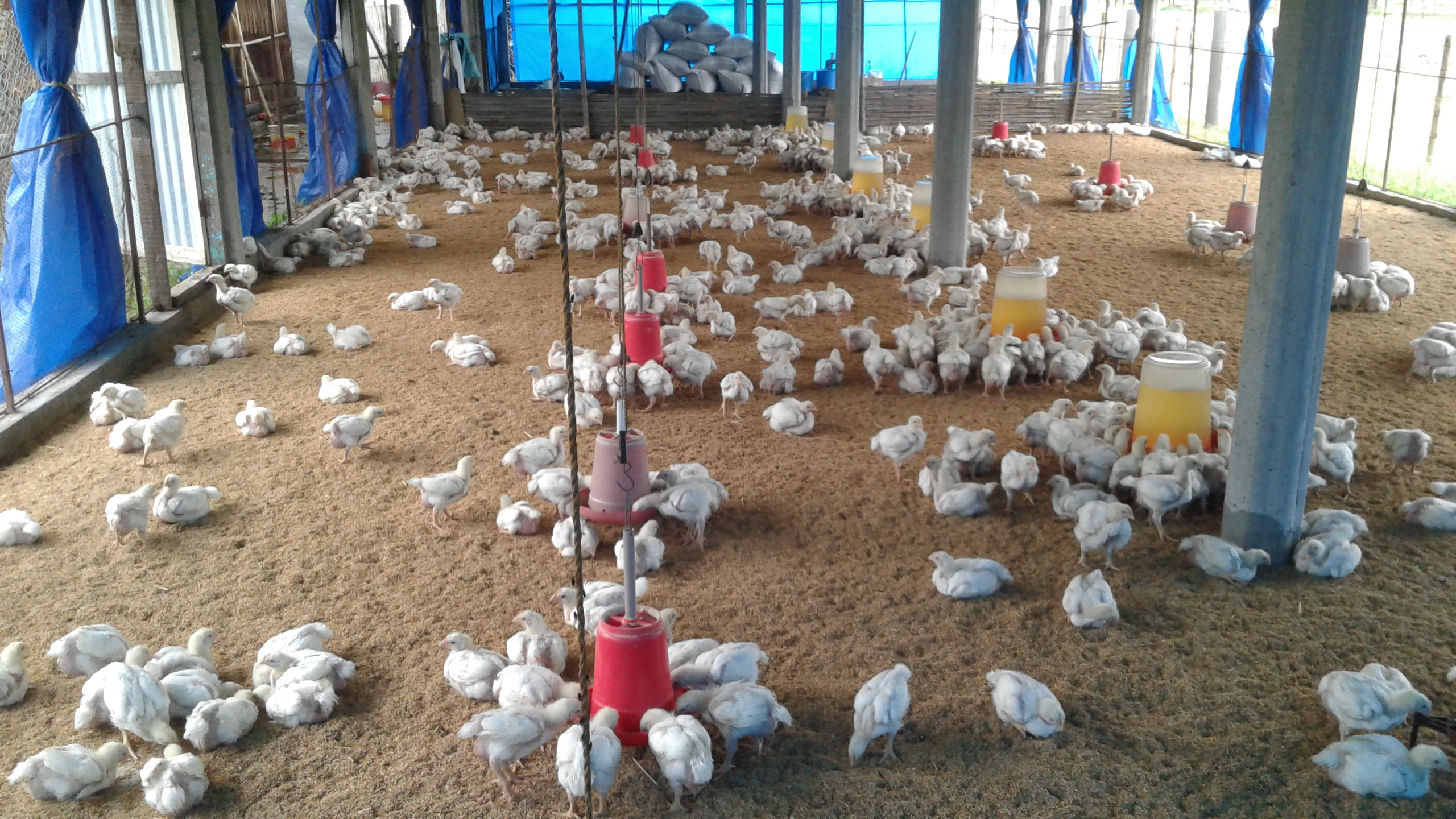
Poultry farming in Shivasatakshi municipality

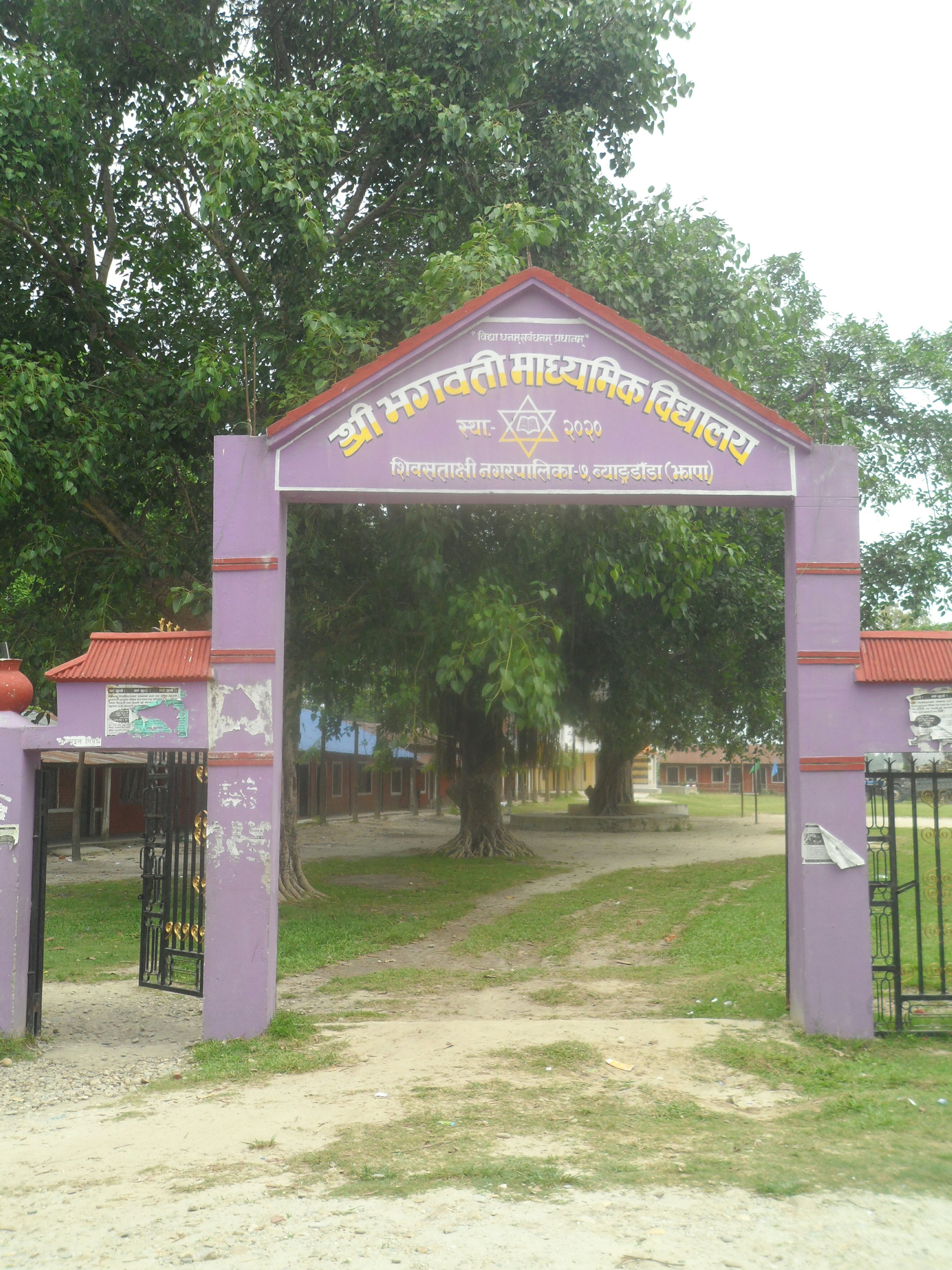
Shree Bhagawati Secondary School Bangdanda, Shivasatakshi
