= Haldibari, Nepal =

Haldibari हल्दिवारी
- Village development committee
- Location in Nepal
- Coordinates: 26°33′36″N 88°1′12″E
- Country: Nepal
- Province: Province No. 1
- District: Jhapa District

Population (1991)
  - Total: 6,407
- Time zone: UTC+5:45 (Nepal Time)

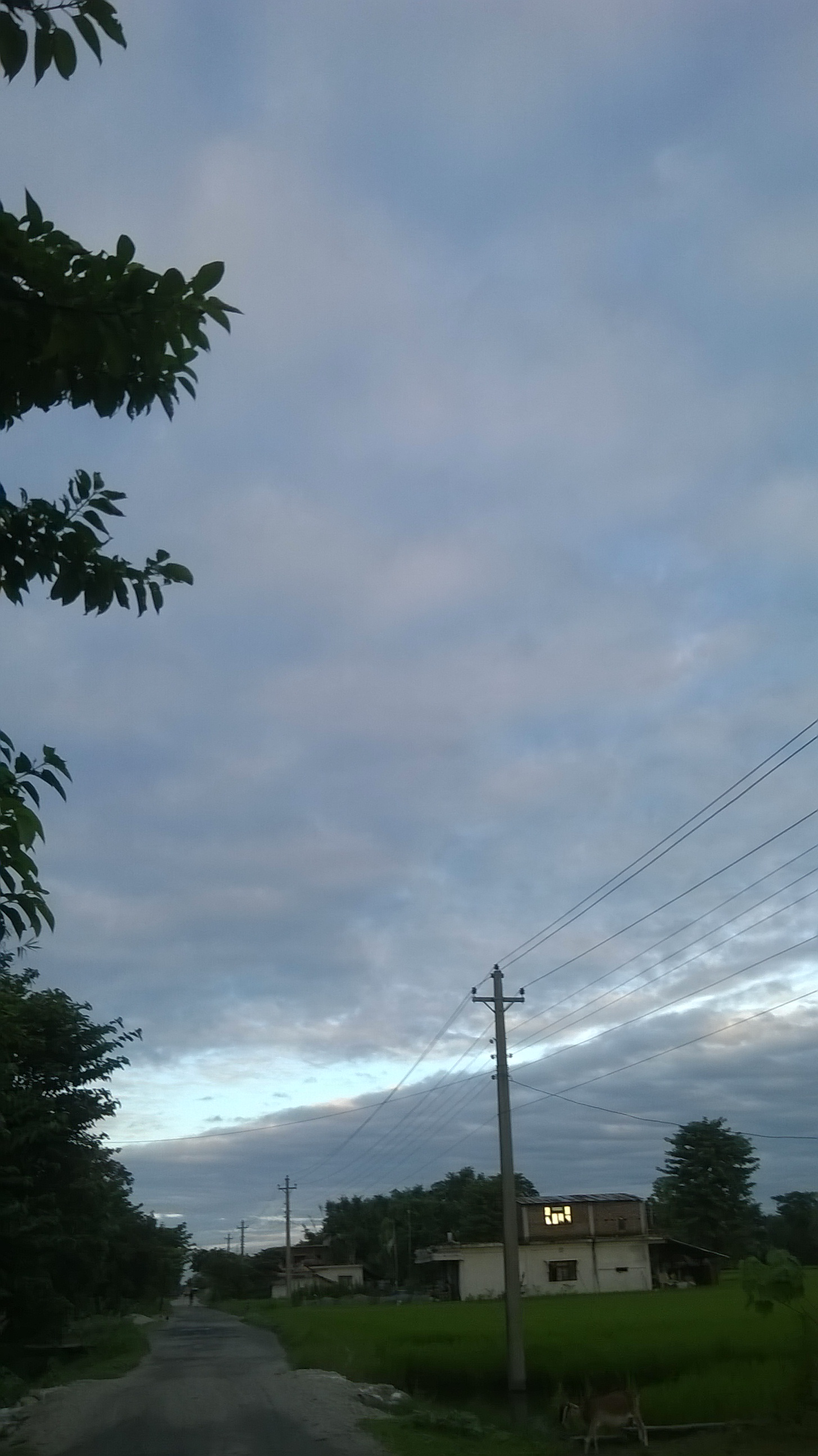

Haldibari is a village development committee (VDC) in Jhapa District in Province No. 1 of southeastern Nepal. Haldibari, from Haldi, means besar/turmeric. At the time of the 1991 Nepal census, it had a population of 6,407 people living in 1,167 individual households.

Haldibari is 4 km (2.5 mi) from Chandragadhi and 7 km (4.3 mi) from Birtamod and the Mahendra Highway and approximately 5 km from the border with India. The center of Haldibari is Haldibari Chowk. There are one post office and one police station located near Haldibari Chowk.

There are two major factories: Haldibari Tea and Rakura Tea Factory. Most parts of Haldibari are covered with tea gardens. Different castes of people like Rajbanshi, Satar live here, in addition to Brahmin, Chettri, Kumai, Damai, Newar, Sarki, Rai, Limbu, and so on. Once a week on Saturday, a fair is held at Haldibari bazaar near Haldibari Chowk.

Most people in this VDC are farmers. They produce garlic, paddy, maize, etc., according to the seasons. Bitter nut is a fruit found in this VDC. The Nepali and Rajbanshi languages are widely spoken.

Roads provide the main transportation in this VDC; most parts of this VDC are reached by road.

One of the important sahakari sastha is Ekata Bahu Uhdhesya Sahakari Sastha, which gives loans to the farmers.
