= Radha Krishna Mainali =

Nepali politician

Former Minister for sports and education
- In office 1 February 2005 – 25 April 2006
- Monarch: King Gyanendra Bir Bikram Shah

Personal details
- Born: 26 September 1946 (age 79) Chokpur, Taplejung, Nepal
- Party: CPN (ML); CPN (UML) (before 1998); CPN (ML) -1998 (1998–2002); UCPN (2002–present)

Radha Krishna Mainali, better known as R. K. Mainali (born September 26, 1946 in Chokpur, Taplejung District) is a Nepalese politician. In the early 1970s he was one (along with his brother, C.P. Mainali) of the radical communists who led the Jhapa rebellion, inspired by the Naxalite movement in India.

R.K. Mainali was imprisoned in 1973, and was not released until 1986. After his release he argued that the communists should form broadbased movements for democratic change. By this time he was a leading member of the Communist Party of Nepal (Marxist-Leninist). He was a prominent leader of the 1990 Jana Andolan as the Acting Chairman of the United Left Front, and was one of four Jana Andolan leaders to appear on national TV on April 8, 1990 to declare that the movement for democracy had been victorious.

He later became a leading figure in the Communist Party of Nepal (Unified Marxist-Leninist) (which the CPN(ML) had merged into). R.K. Mainali contested the Jhapa-5 constituency in the 1994 parliamentary election. He won the seat with 16,361 votes, defeating the Nepali Congress candidate Surya Narayan Tajpuriya. After the election he became Minister for Agriculture, Land Reforms and Management in the CPN(UML) minority government headed by Man Mohan Adhikari. Mainali was Minister of Health in the coalition government led by Lokendra Bahadur Chand between March 12, 1997, and October 6, 1997.

In 1998 he took part in a split and the formation of the Communist Party of Nepal (Marxist-Leninist). He became a politburo member of the new CPN(ML). He was a candidate of CPN(ML) in the 1999 parliamentary election, but lost his seat.

In 2002, when CPN(UML) and CPN(ML) reunified, Mainali returned to CPN(UML), and became a member of the party's Standing Committee. However, in July 2003 his party membership was suspended due to his disagreements with the party. Mainali had criticized the tactics of the party and advocated rapprochement with King Gyanedra.

After the royal coup on February 1, 2005, R.K. Mainali sided with the monarch and became Minister for Education & Sports in his cabinet. Following the overthrow of the royal cabinet in April 2006, Mainali has denied responsibility for the repression unleashed on protestors during the popular upsurge in that year (Loktantra Andolan). In September 2010, Mainali joined the Unified Communist Party of Nepal (Maoist).
