= Bhadrapur Municipality =

Town in Jhapa District, Nepal

Bhadrapur Municipality भद्रपुर नगरपालिका
- Municipality
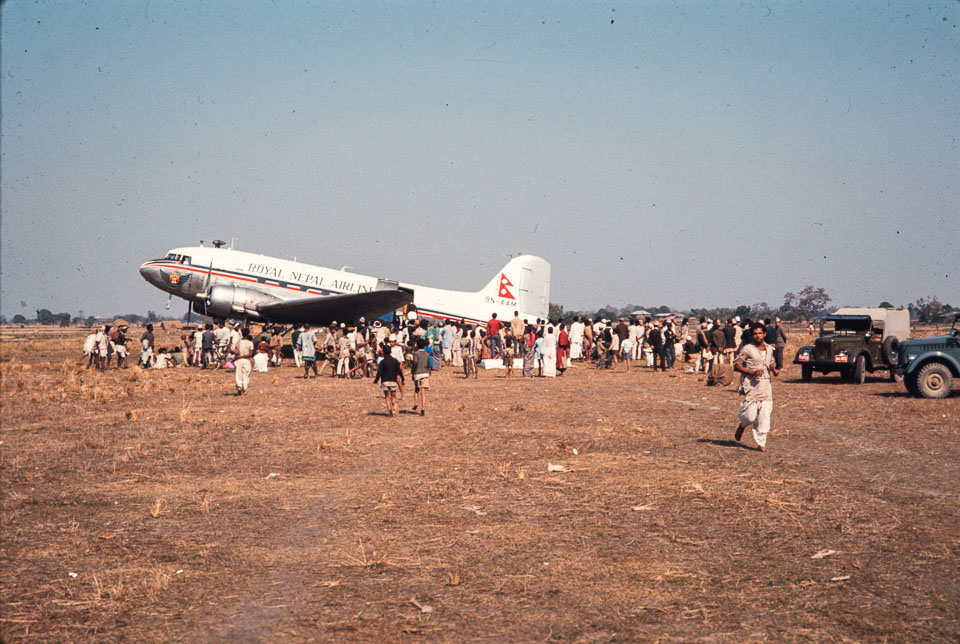
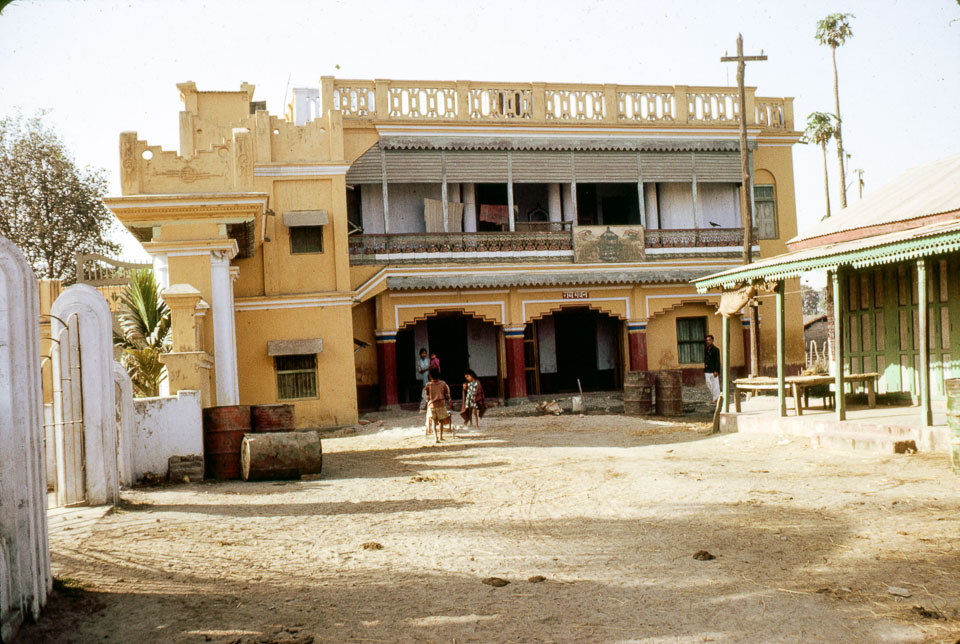
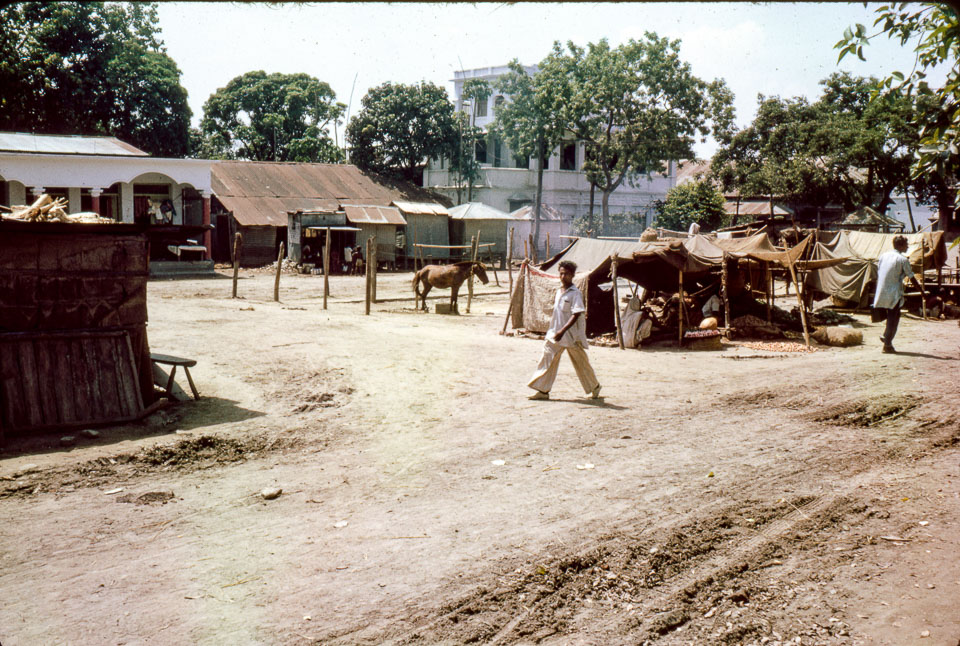
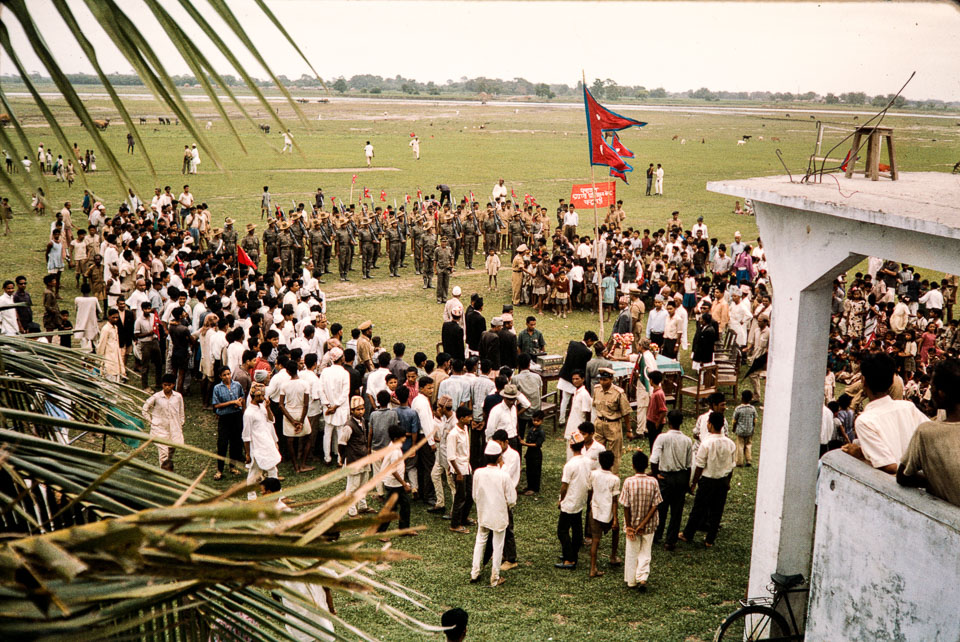
- Clockwise from top: Bhadrapur Airport, Main city center, Celebration in Bhadrapur school and Concrete house (photos are from the 1960s)
- Nickname: Bhadrapur Bazaar
- Location in Koshi province Bhadrapur Municipality (Nepal)
- Coordinates: 26.5444°N 88.0944°E
- Country: Nepal
- Province: Koshi
- District: Jhapa

Government
  - Mayor: Ganesh Pokhrel (NC)
  - Deputy Mayor: Radha Karki (RPP)
  - (Executive Officer): Sunil Niraula
- Elevation: 91 m (299 ft)

Population (2021)
  - Total: 70,913
- Time zone: UTC+5:45 (NST)
- Postal code: 57200
- Area code: 023
- Website: www.bhadrapurmun.gov.np

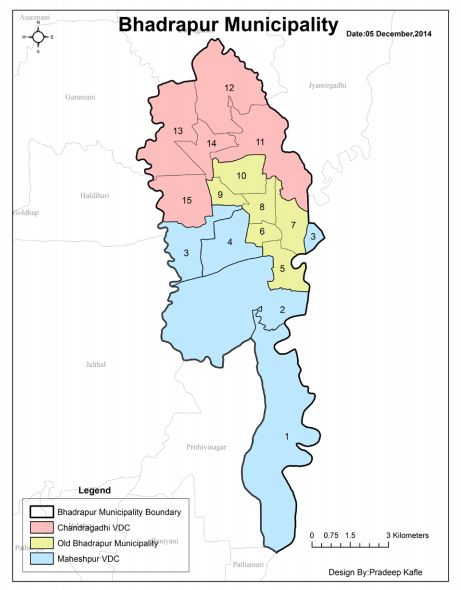
Map of Consolidated Bhadrapur Municipality.

Bhadrapur, or Chandragadhi (Nepali: भद्रपुर), is a town and municipality in Jhapa District in the Koshi Pradesh of southeastern Nepal. It lies on the banks of the Mechi River and shares borders with Bihar on the south and West Bengal on the north. There is a border crossing with a customs office for goods. Galgalia village in Kishanganj district borders Bhadrapur.

Bhadrapur is one of Nepal's oldest municipalities. At the time of the 2011 Nepal census, it had a population of 70,913. Bhadrapur Airport offers flights to Kathmandu. This airport is the best way to reach Kathmandu from the eastern part of Nepal and India (i.e., West Bengal and Sikkim).

Bhadrapur is one of the most multi-cultural cities in Nepal. In this city live people from all the districts of Nepal and others who migrated from India, Bhutan, and Bangladesh. Different ethnic and religious backgrounds, such as Gangain(Ganesh), Rajbanshi, Dhimal, Meche, Brahmin, Chhetri, Rai, Limbu, Sherpa, Tamang, Madbadi, Bengali, Muslim, etc., live in Bhadrapur in peace, and harmony with other people. Bhadrapur is the "tea city" of Nepal. It is a starting point for tourist attractions. A few hours' ride north takes one close to the Himalayas. There are good roads up to a height of around 3,700 metres (12,100 ft).

Bhadrapur has important governmental and other infrastructure, including a zonal hospital, airport, Mechi Multiple campuses, different schools, Mahendra Park, stadium police and military headquarters, and hosts the Central District Offices.

However, due to the construction of the Mahendra Highway or East-West Highway (north of Bhadrapur), economic activities have shifted north to the junction of the highway Birtamod. This has left Bhadrapur with a receding population and crippled its once-booming economic activity.

In the last decade, Bhadrapur has slowly transformed itself into a tea hub with new plantations and tea factories being established every year. The much-awaited Mechi Bridge joining Bhadrapur to India (Galgalia) is now constructed and acts as a lifeline to the revitalization of Bhadrapur as well as the far eastern part of Nepal. There is a checkpoint at the border.

== History ==
Bhadrapur was a very prosperous city during the early 1900s. It was renowned for its rice cultivation due to its rich, fertile soil. This period saw rice mills being established. The prosperous rice business led Bhadrapur to its most prosperous period. Now, Bhadrapur has transformed into a major city of tea factories as the old rice mills are no longer operating.

== Industries ==
Bhadrapur used to be home to Momento Apparels, which was one of Nepal's largest exporters of ready-made garments. The factory has been forced out of operation since 2012. In its heyday, the factory had a workforce of 2,000 and supplied ready-made garments to the US (including retail outlets such as Walmart and JCPenney) and several European countries.

== Transport ==
Bhadrapur Airport is served by Nepal Airlines, Saurya Airlines, Shree Airlines, Yeti Airlines and Buddha Air with daily flights. Nepal Airlines flies 3 times a week, the others have daily flights. The first flight to Kathmandu is at 06:30am and the last flight is 9:00 pm.

== Image gallery ==
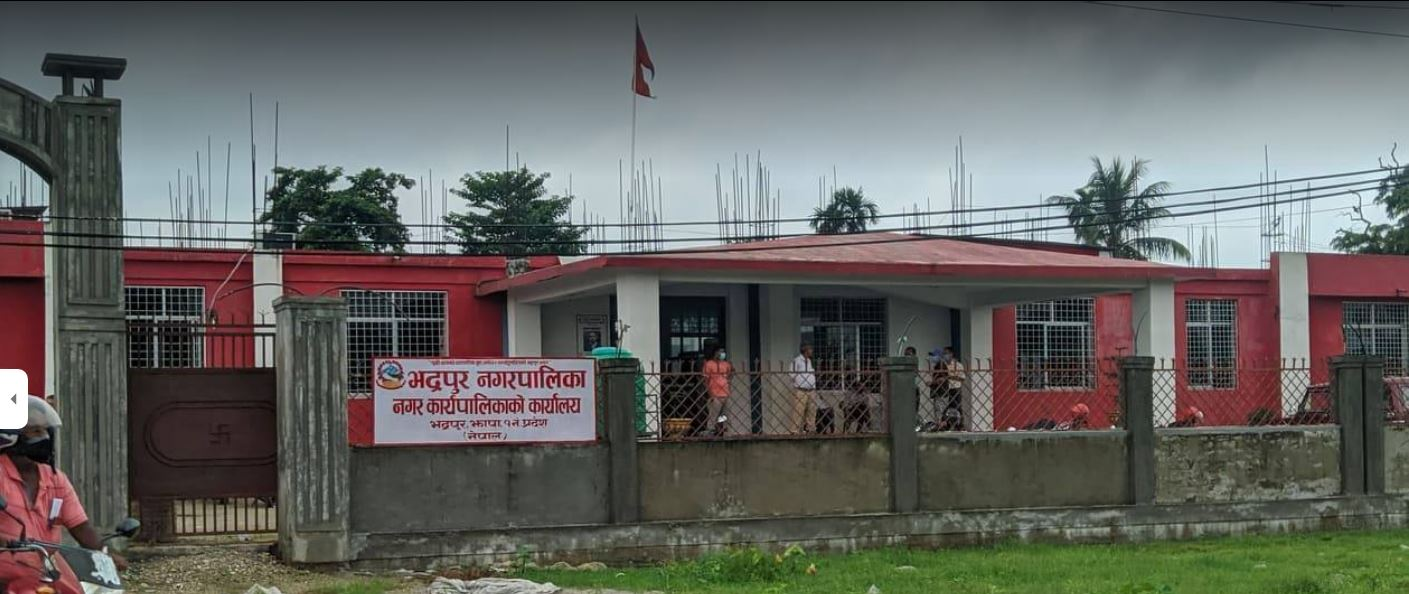
Image of Administration building of Bhadrapur Municipality

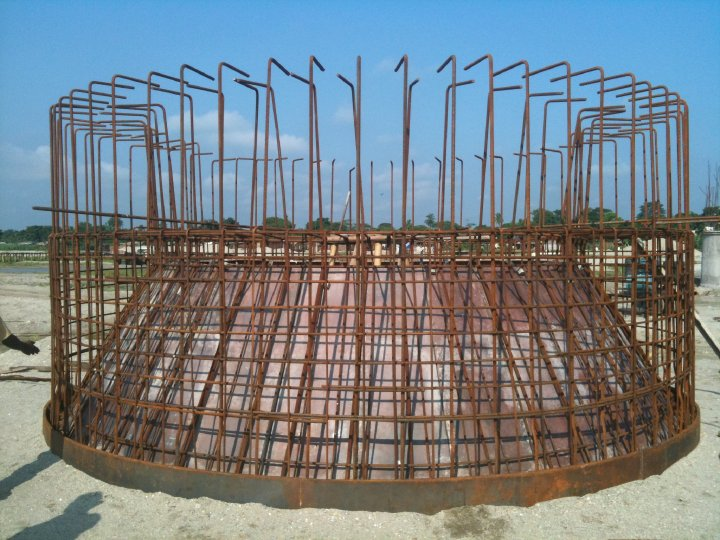
Bridge foundation reinforcements

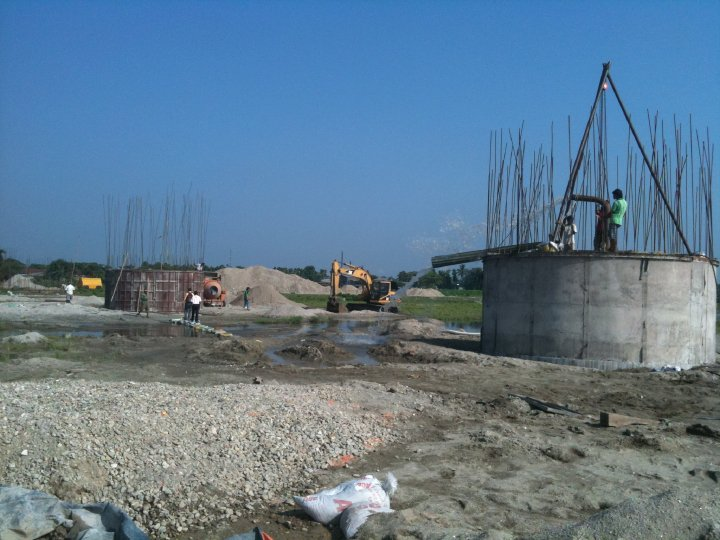
Caisson being drained

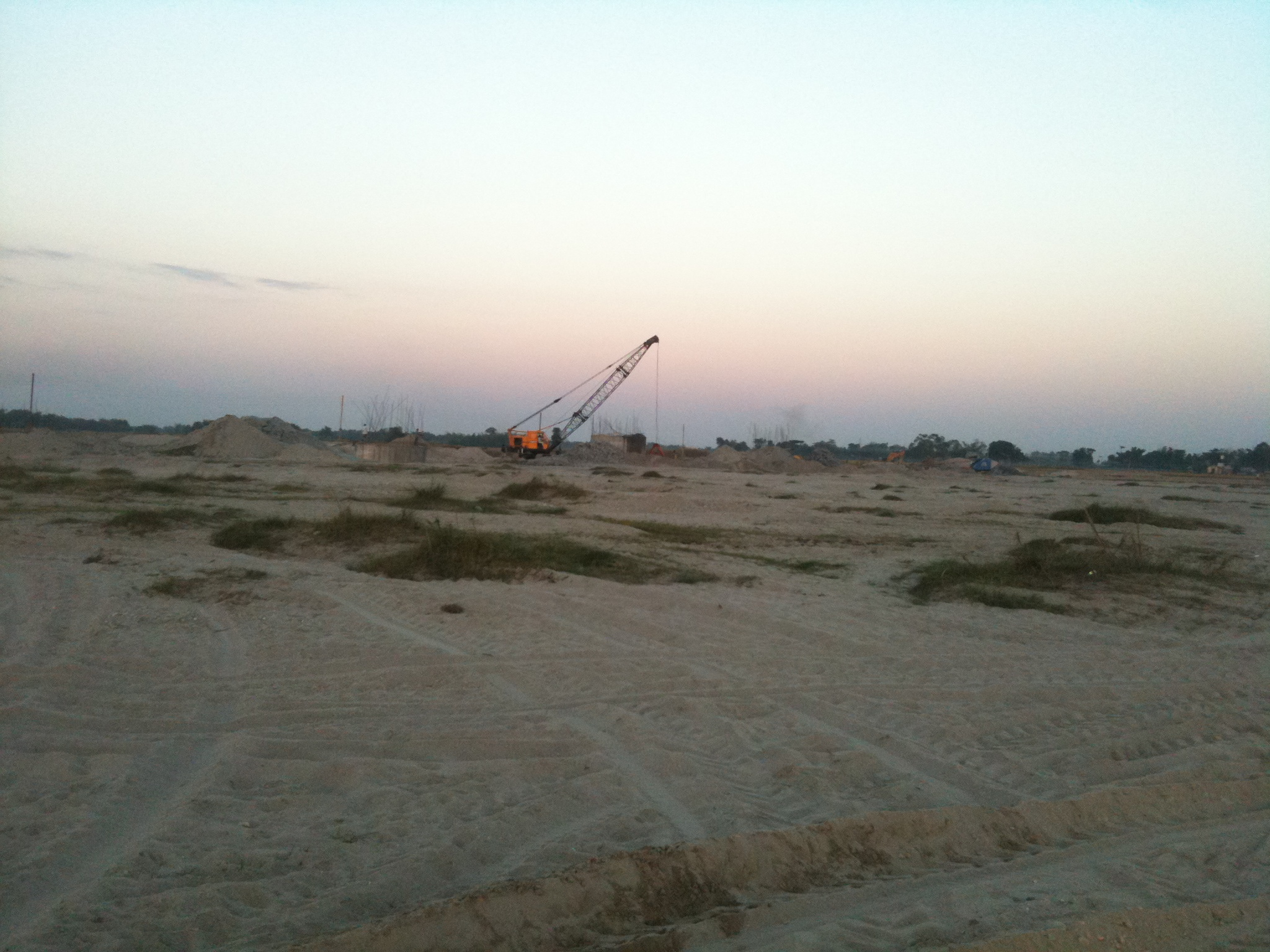
Mechi Bridge under construction, 2011

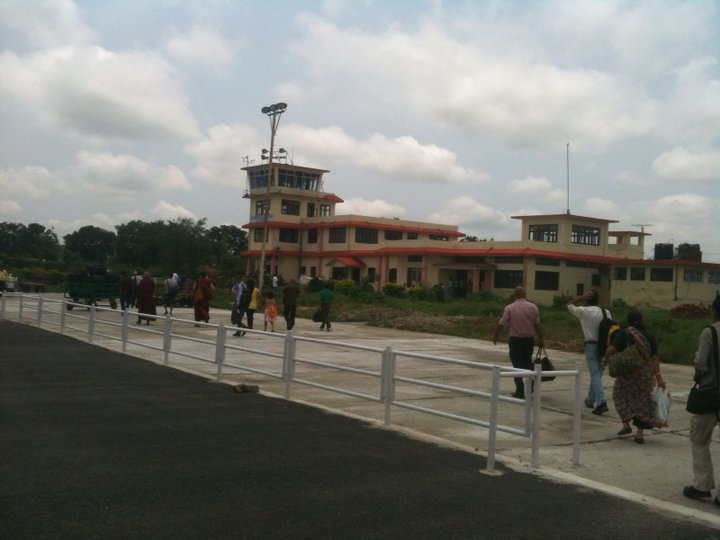
Bhadrapur Airport

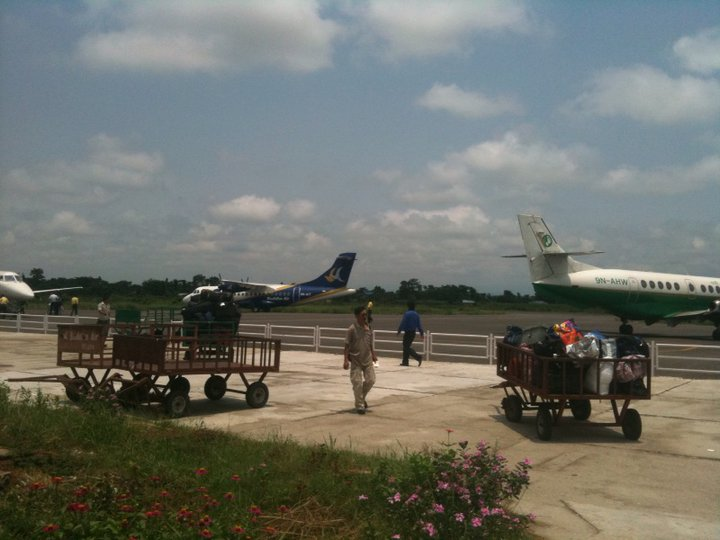
Busy airport

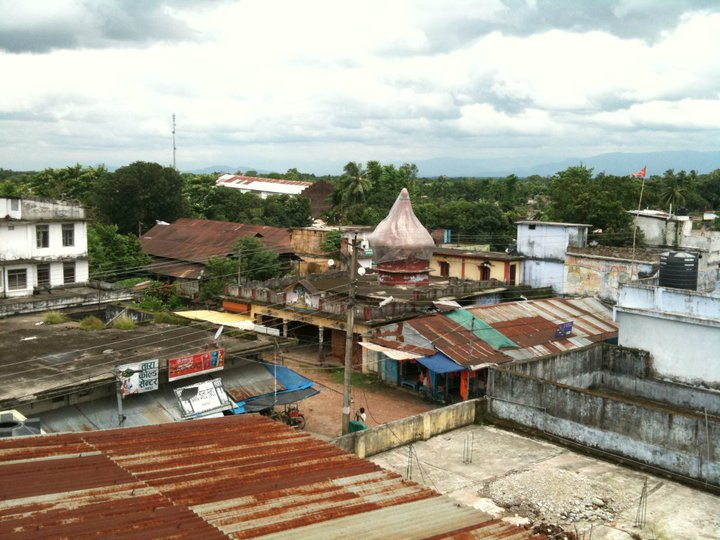
Bhadrapur Bazaar

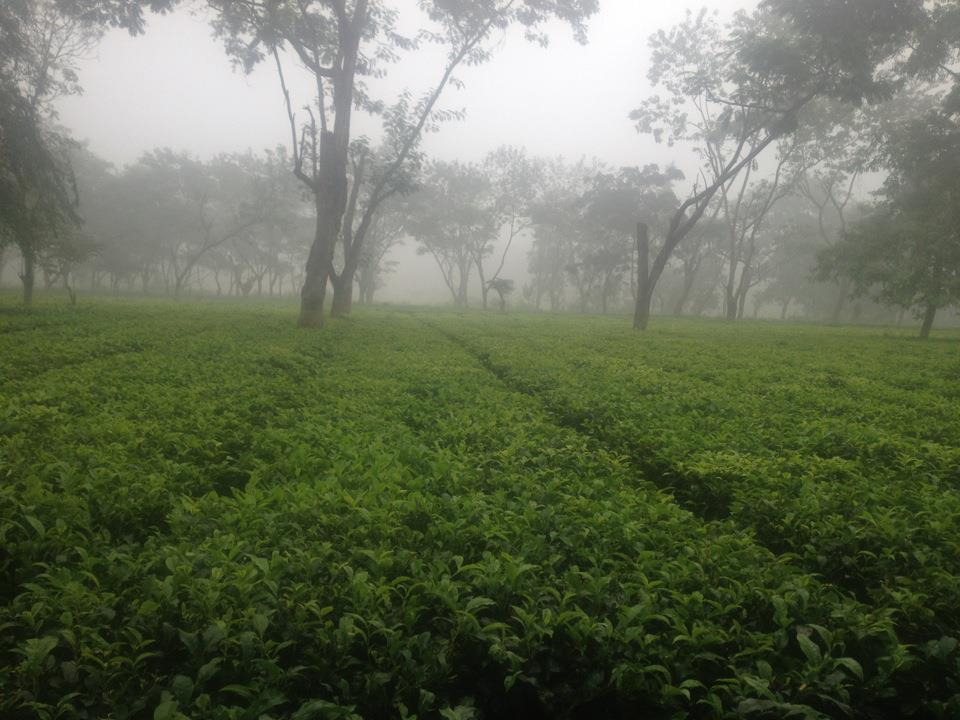
Bajra Tea Garden, Bhadrapur

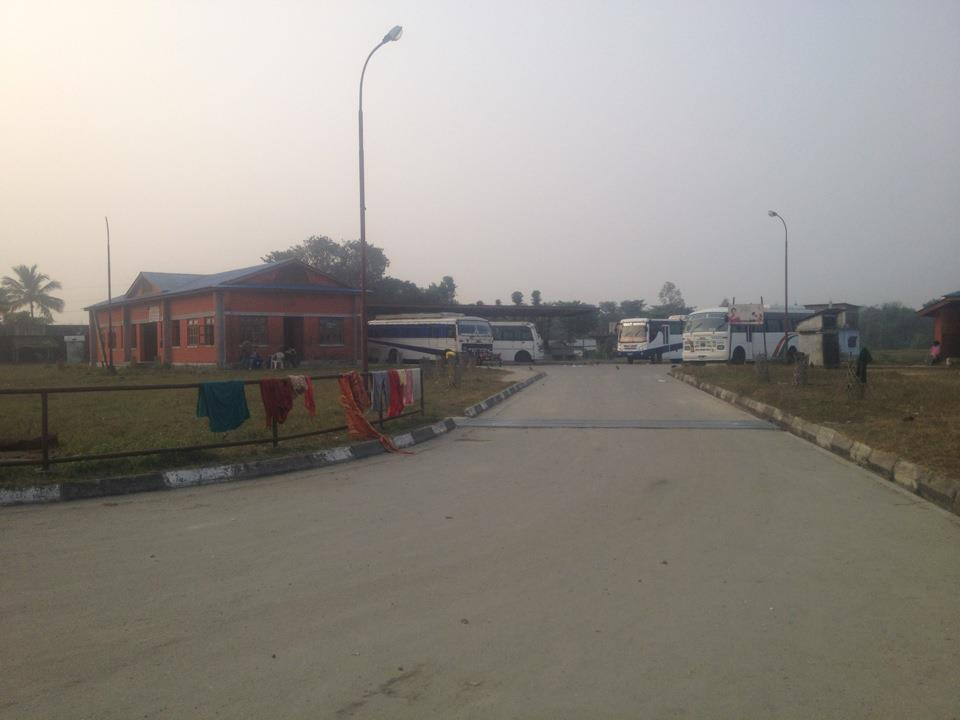
Bhadrapur Bus Park

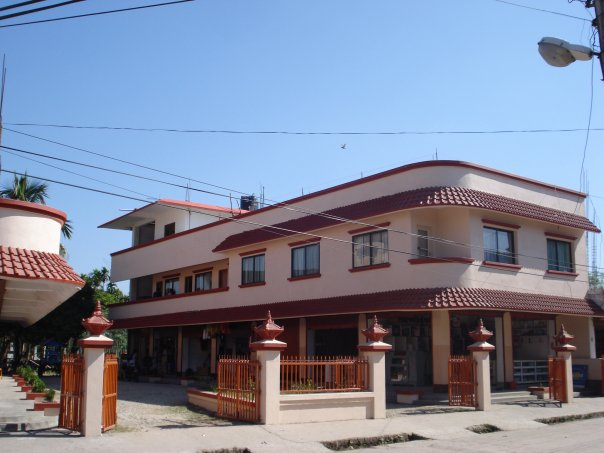
Kameshwar Complex in the heart of Bhadrapur Bazaar

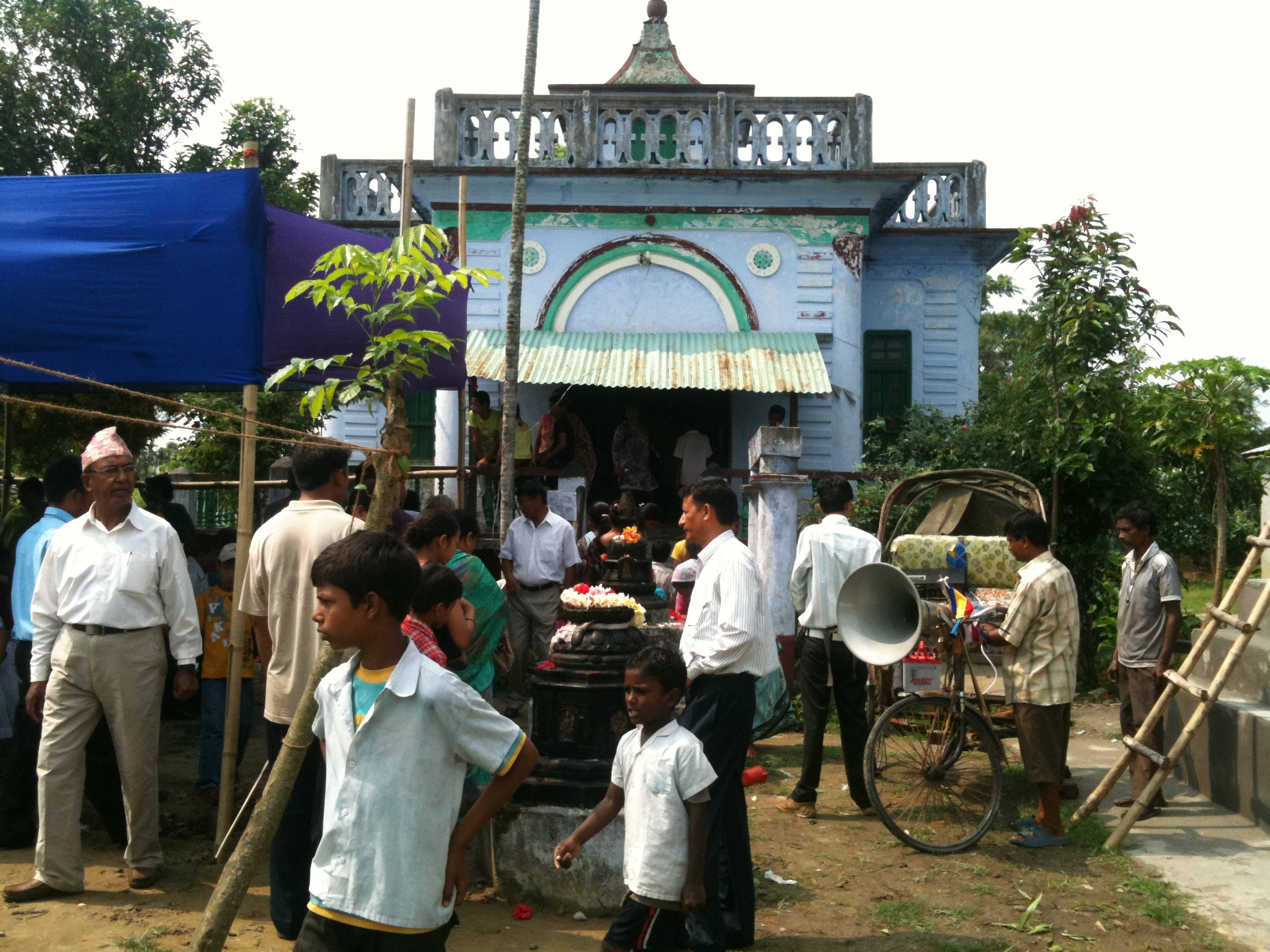
Buddha Mandir
