= Jhapa District =

District in Koshi Province, Nepal

Coordinates: 27.917373°N 84.193726°E

Jhapa District झापा जिल्ला
- District
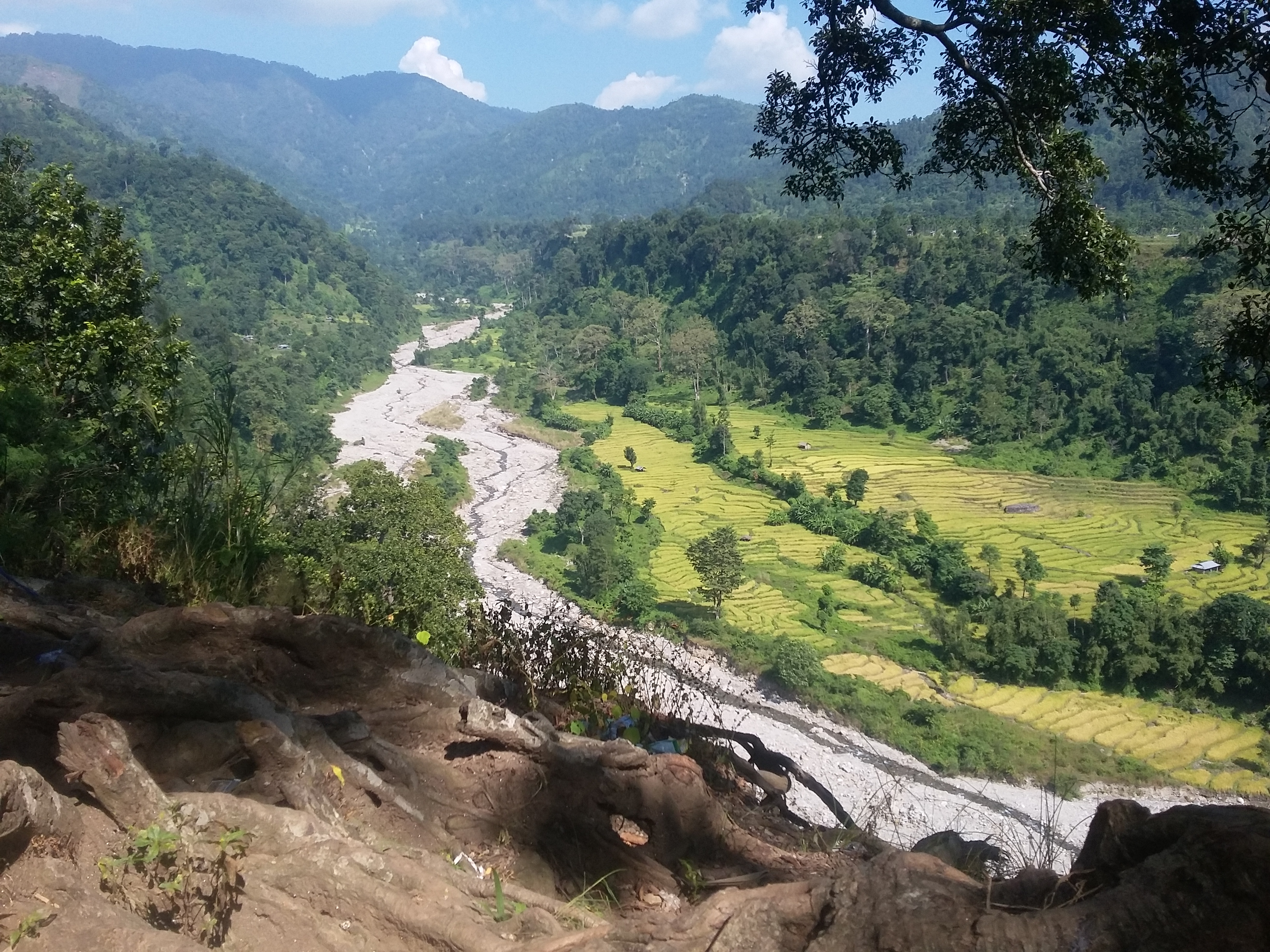
- View of both hills and Terai in Jhapa district

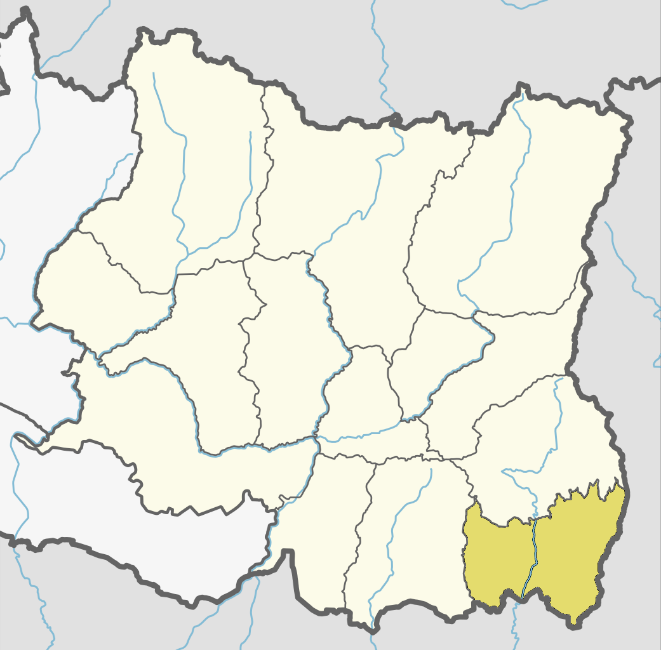
- Country: Nepal
- Province: Koshi Province
- Admin HQ.: Bhadrapur

Government
  - Type: Coordination committee
  - Body: DCC, Jhapa
  - Head: Mr. Bishwanath Baral
  - Deputy-Head: Mrs. Shanta Rokka
  - Parliamentary constituencies: 5
  - Provincial constituencies: 10
  - Chief District Officer: Shiva Ram Gelal

Area
  - Total: 1,606 km^{2} (620 sq mi)
- Elevation (maximum): 506 m (1,660 ft)

Population (2021)
  - Total: 998,054
  - Rank: 4th (Nepal)
  - Density: 621.5/km^{2} (1,610/sq mi)
  - Households: 219,989

Demographics
  - Ethnic groups: Bahun, Chhetri, Rajbanshi, Limbu, Rai
  - Female ♀: 51.97%
  - Male ♂/100 female: 92,43

Human Development Index
  - Per Capita Income: 1,226 USD
  - Poverty rate: 21.82
  - Literacy: 75%
  - Life Expectancy: 67.29
- Time zone: UTC+05:45 (NPT)
- Telephone Code: 023
- Main Language(s): Nepali, Rajbanshi, Surjapuri language Limbu, Maithili
- Major highways: Mahendra Highway, Postal Highway
- Website: daojhapa.moha.gov.np

Jhapa District (Nepali: झापा जिल्ला;) is a district of Koshi Province in eastern Nepal named after the Rajbanshi word "Jhapa", meaning "to cover" (verb). The 2021 Nepal Census, puts the total population of the district at 994,090. The total area of the district is 1,606 square kilometres.

== History ==
The lowlands of Limbuwan (present-day terai lands of Sunsari, Morang, and Jhapa) were collectively known as Morang since the time of King Mawrong of 7th century. In the beginning of 1400 AD, Morang Kingdom patriated from Kingdom of Ilam and Kingdom of Mikluk Bodhey (Choubise) and started ruling on its own.

== Location ==
Jhapa is the easternmost district of Nepal and lies in the fertile Terai plains. It is part of the Outer Terai. Jhapa borders with Ilam in the north, Morang in the west, the Indian state of Bihar in the south and the Indian state of West Bengal to the southeast and east. Geographically, it covers an area of 1,606 km^{2} (620 sq mi) and lies on 87°39’ east to 88°12’ east longitude and 26°20’ north to 26°50’ north latitude.

== Climate and geography ==
Jhapa receive 250 to 300 cm of rainfall a year, and mostly during the monsoon season in the summer, and its hilly northern area receives more rainfall than the south. The maximum temperature recorded is 42.5 °C in summer and 1 °C in winter. The lowest elevation point is 58 meters which is the lowest land in Nepal and the highest elevation point is 500 meters from mean sea level.

Climate Zone	Elevation Range	% of Area
Lower Tropical	below 300 meters (1,000 ft)	98.8%
Upper Tropical	300 to 1,000 meters 1,000 to 3,300 ft.	1.2%

== Administrative divisions ==
Jhapa consists of 15 administrative divisions including eight municipalities and seven rural municipalities. Each division has wards according to the demographic and geographic size. These are:

=== Municipalities ===
- Mechinagar Municipality
- Bhadrapur Municipality
- Birtamod Municipality
- Arjundhara Municipality
- Kankai Municipality
- Shivasatakshi Municipality
- Gauradaha Municipality
- Damak Municipality

=== Rural municipalities ===
- Buddhashanti Rural Municipality
- Haldibari Rural Municipality
- Kachankawal Rural Municipality
- Barhadashi Rural Municipality
- Jhapa Rural Municipality
- Gauriganj Rural Municipality
- Kamal Rural Municipality

=== Villages ===
- Hattikilla

== Demographics ==
At the time of the 2021 Nepal census, Jhapa District had a population of 998,054. 23.25% of the population is under 5 years of age. It has a literacy rate of 82.83% and a sex ratio of 1085 females per 1000 males. 704,357 (70.57%) lived in municipalities.

Jhapa District has an average population density of around 619 per square kilometer. The district population growth rate is 1.93%. However, the growth is balanced and in-migration is rapidly increasing day to day into the district. At the time of the 2021 Nepal census, Jhapa District had a population of 994,090 making it the 4th largest district in Nepal after Kathmandu, Morang and Rupandehi.

Ethnicity/caste of Jhapa district (2021)
1. Bahun (23.2%)
2. Chhetri (16.8%)
3. Rajbanshi (8.26%)
4. Limbu (7.32%)
5. Rai (4.58%)
6. Santal (3.47%)
7. Kami (3.39%)
8. Newar (3.23%)
9. Muslim (3.14%)
10. Tamang (3.11%)
11. Magar (2.11%)
12. Damai (2.07%)
13. Other Terai Janajati (5.76%)
14. Madheshi non-Dalit (5.22%)
15. Other Hill Janjati (4.25%)
16. Other Khas (1.15%)
17. Others (2.90%)

Being at the cross-roads of the eastern hills and the eastern Terai, Jhapa has huge ethnic diversity with 110 castes/ethnic groups represented. The largest communities are Bahun and Chhetri. Other communities include the Janajati Limbu and other Kirati peoples, Dalit communities like Kami and Damai, as well as Tamang, Newar and Magar and Adivasi communities like the Rajbanshi/Tajpuriya, Gangai or Ganesh, Santal, Tharu and Dhimal in the Terai.

Languages of Jhapa district (2021)
1. Nepali (61.5%)
2. Rajbanshi (8.54%)
3. Limbu (5.43%)
4. Maithili (4.18%)
5. Santali (3.22%)
6. Tamang (2.01%)
7. Rai (1.82%)
8. Gangai (1.79%)
9. Tajpuriya (1.31%)
10. Magar (1.06%)
11. Others (9.17%)

As their first language, 61.47% of the population spoke Nepali, 8.54% Rajbanshi, 5.43% Limbu, 4.18% Maithili, 3.22% Santali, 2.01% Tamang, 1.82% Rai, 1.79% Gangai, 1.31% Tajpuriya and 1.06% Magar as their first language. In 2011, Nepali was spoken by 55.82% of the population as their first language.

Religion in Jhapa District (2021)
Religion	Percent
Hinduism	79.10%
Kirat Mundhum	9.38%
Buddhism	4.94%
Islam	3.33%
Christianity	2.60%
Prakriti	0.63%
Other or not stated	0.02%

Religion: 79.10% were Hindu, 9.38% Kirati, 4.94% Buddhist, 3.33% Muslim, 2.60% Christian, 0.63% Prakriti and 0.02% others.

== International Borders ==
Jhapa borders the Indian state of Bihar to the south and the Indian state of West Bengal to the east. Jhapa is an eastern entry point of Nepal from India. Kakarbhitta-Mechinagar border lies in Jhapa and is an important trade point for Nepal.

== Education ==
Among 77 districts, Jhapa has a literacy rate of 75.2%, higher than the national average. There are enough primary schools, secondary schools, high schools and colleges available both from private sector and the government. One such school is Shree Adarsh Vidya Mandir Higher Secondary School.

== Notable people ==
Jhapa district is home to notable personalities including one former prime minister and two former deputy prime ministers.

- KP Sharma Oli, former prime minister of Nepal and chairman of CPN (UML)
- Bishwa Prakash Sharma, general secretary of Nepali Congress
- Rajendra Prasad Lingden, chairman of Rastriya Prajatantra Party
- Krishna Prasad Sitaula, former Home minister and senior leader of Nepali Congress
- Radha Krishna Mainali, senior Communist leader
- CP Mainali, chairman of CPN (ML) and former Deputy prime minister of Nepal
- Devendra Dahal, former Ministry, Ministry of Infrastructure and Transport, Member of National Assembly.
- Ananta Tamang, National Football Player, All Nepal Football Association
