= List of bridges in Nepal =

This list of bridges of Nepal draws up an inventory of the remarkable bridges of Nepal, as well by their dimensional characteristics, as by their architectural or historical interest.

== The long suspension bridges of Nepal ==
In 2015, Nepal had a total road network of 80,078 kilometres (49,758 mi) of which 53,143 kilometres (33,022 mi) are local rural roads, of these, only 1,697 kilometres (1,054 mi) has been black-topped. Modern roads are few and mostly concentrated on the Terai plain, the area stretching along the border with India and which accounts for nearly half of the country's population. In 2020, there is only one railway line of 59 kilometers, also located near India and the capital Kathmandu has no railway connection. The population is essentially rural in this region at the foot of the Himalayas, but the steep reliefs are a brake on the development of the local populations who are already among the poorest in the world.

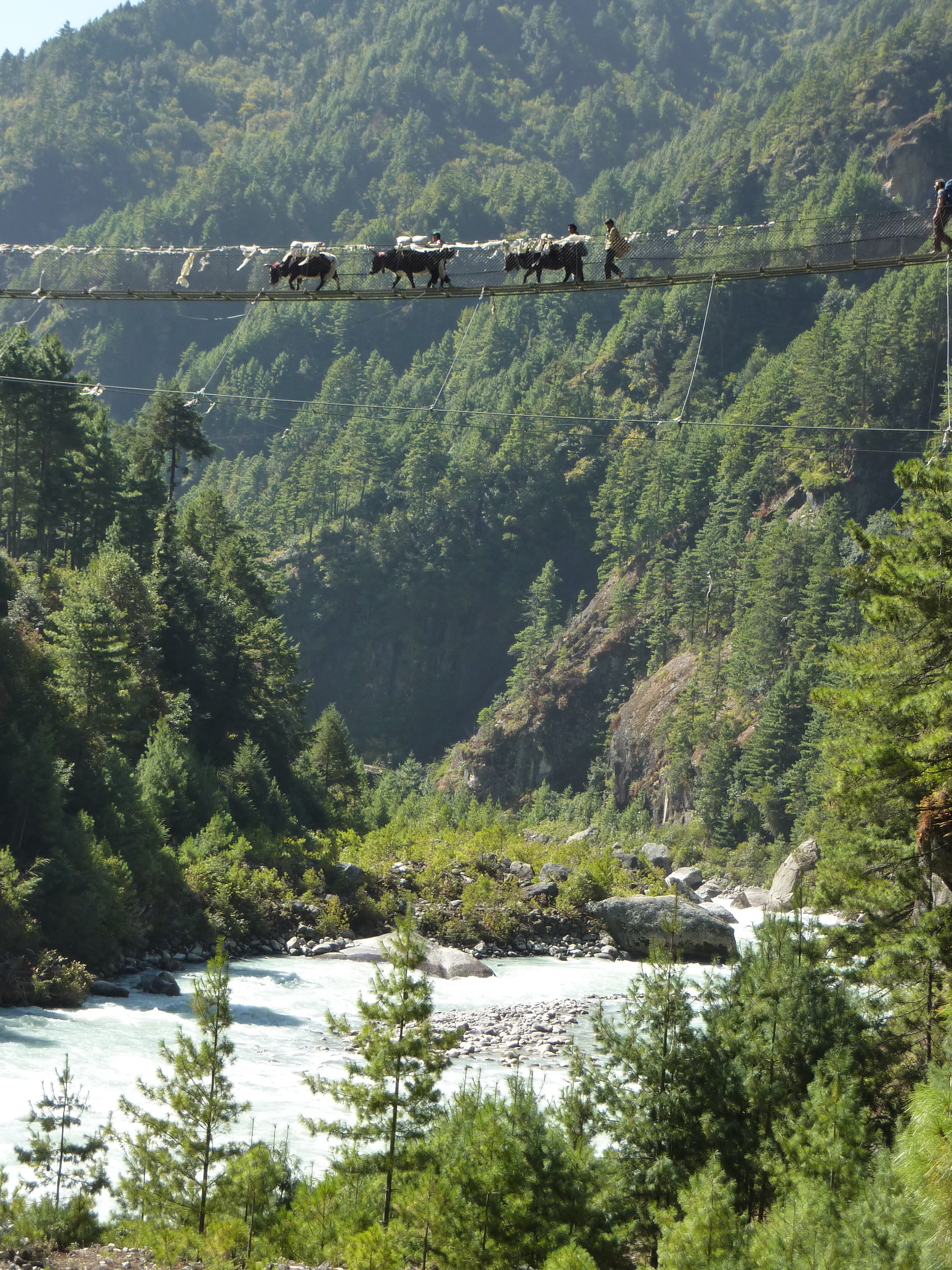
Yaks on a suspension bridge near Namche Bazaar at the foothills of the Himalayas.

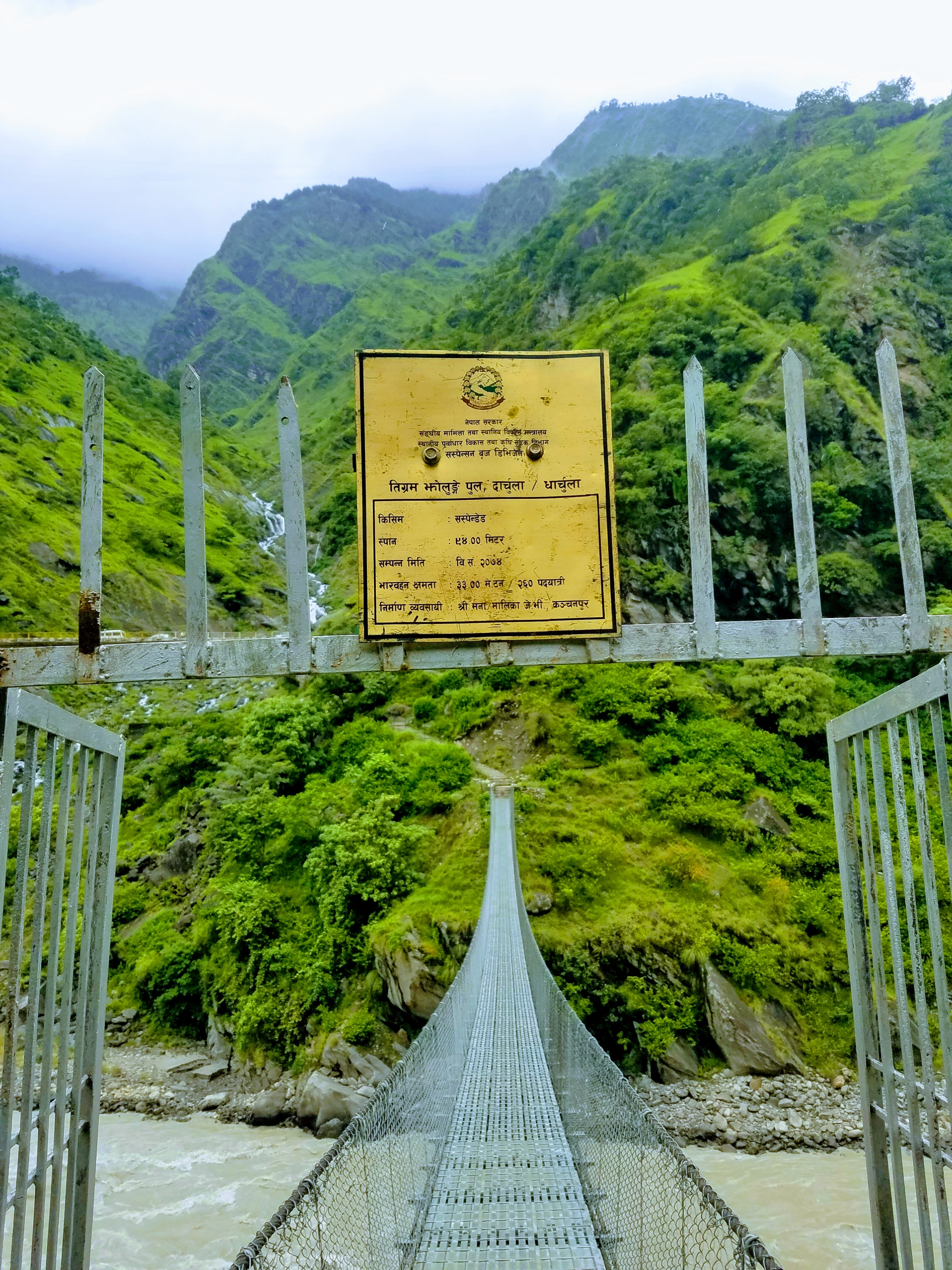
Tigram Suspension Bridge ( length : 98m) which connects India and Nepal. View from Nepali side

Until the 1950s, the whole country with the exception of the Terai was provided only with trails for a large part of the territory, some essential trade routes had been established since the beginning of the 20th century, despite the isolation of the Nepal. Louis Harper introduced the first modern suspension footbridges to Nepal in the late 1890s, he had improved the system in the United Kingdom from wooden pylons to steel lattice pylons, they were pre-fabricated in Scotland and shipped to site for assembly. At least 4 bridges of this type remain in service in Nepal today. This system was unfortunately not effective and failed to meet significant demand.

All these constraints led the government to create the Suspension Bridges Division in 1964 (replaced by the Trail Bridge Section in 2001) which studied with Swiss engineers a model of durable, easy-to-build simple suspension bridge, adapted to the Nepalese relief and therefore to large spans ranging from 120 to 350 metres (390 to 1,150 ft), and a whole first generation of trail bridges was born on the main axes, with up to 30 bridges built per year. Under an increasingly strong demand, a second generation of bridges had developed with economic and environmental stakes, these bridges are optimized to be built with local materials and carried out by a local workforce in order to extend this system across the country. They will nevertheless have shorter spans than the first generation bridges, in the order of 40 to 120 meters.

By 2004, more than 3000 suspension bridges have thus been built on the Nepalese landscape including 2230 bridges through Swiss support with an overall length of more than 180 kilometres (110 mi). Two types of bridges have been built: 580 long-span trail bridges with lengths ranging from 120 to 350 metres (390 to 1,150 ft) on the main trails under the responsibility of the Department of Local Infrastructure Development and Agricultural Roads and 1650 short-span community bridges up to 120 metres (390 ft) in length, built by the communities themselves under the responsibility of User Committees. In September 2015, a total of 6000 completed trail bridges has been celebrated.

But the needs are still numerous and signs of weakness are beginning to appear, it is estimated that 200 the number of bridges require heavy work, even replacement (statistics mid-2004). Some footbridges are built on great heights in order to fight against flooding during the monsoon, 14 bridges were destroyed during the glacial break-up of Digcho in the Sagarmatha area in 1985. This phenomenon, also called jökulhlaup, is caused by the rupture of a glacier and causes sudden and devastating floods. The devastated bridges were later rebuilt on higher levels.

They are rediscovered today by tourists during organized backpackings on the footpaths of Everest, Annapurna, the Kathmandu Valley and other sites along Nepal.

== Historical and architectural interest bridges ==
Among the notables bridges of Nepal, we can mention the Dodhara Chandani Bridge which has the originality of being composed of 4 successive suspension bridges with three spans, and a total of 8 large steel truss pylons, which spans nearly 1,500 meters. Its four main spans have very large arrows and each is held by lateral support cables. The bridge is designed as a pedestrian bridge, but bicycles and motorcycles can use the bridge as well. There is enough room so that motorcycles can pass even if they are fully loaded. All traffic travels on the left-hand side, as everywhere else in Nepal.

The bridges presented here are initially sorted by date of commissioning, they thus retrace part of the history of transport in Nepal and the various developments that led to the structures that can be seen today.

	Name	Nepali	Distinction	Length	Type	Carries Crosses	Opened	Location	Province	Ref.
1			Common kind of bridge in Nepal		Cantilever Log bridge Wood					
2	Larja Dobhan Footbridge		Sagarmatha National Park; World Heritage Site (1979)		Suspension; Steel	Footbridge (Lukla - Everest Base Camp Trekking Route); Dudh Koshi		Namche Bazaar; 27°47′24.2″N 86°43′07.7″E	Province No. 1	
3	Sino-Nepal Friendship Bridge closed in 2015	मितेरी पुल	China–Nepal border		Arch; Concrete deck arch	Araniko Highway; Sunkoshi River	1965	Kodari–Zhangmu; 27°58′24.8″N 85°57′50.7″E	Bagmati Province; China	
4	Dodhara Chandani Bridge	दोधारा चाँदनी पुल	Span : 225 m (738 ft) (x4)	1,453 m (4,767 ft)	Suspension; Steel, 8 pylons	Footbridge; Sharda River	2005	Mahakali; 28°55′20.8″N 80°06′27.2″E	Sudurpashchim Province	
5	Bhote Kosi Bungee Footbridge	भोटेकोसी बन्जी पुल	Bungee jumping spot Height : 160 m (520 ft)	166 m (545 ft)	Suspension; Steel	Footbridge; Bhote Koshi	1999	Listikot–Gathi; 27°52′33.0″N 85°53′32.8″E	Bagmati Province	
6	Tinmukhe Bridge	तिनमुखे पुल	Three-way suspension bridge Tri-junction of Gulmi, Palpa and Syangja districts		Suspension; Steel	Footbridge; Gandaki River; Ridi Khola	2021	Ruru Kshetra; 27°56′05.3″N 83°26′22.8″E	Lumbini Province; Gandaki Province	

== Major road bridges ==
Nepal's largest road bridge, the Karnali Bridge, was designed by Steinman, Boynton, Gronquist & Birdsall of USA, constructed by Kawasaki Heavy Industries of Japan and funded by the World Bank. It is part of the country's largest highway, the Mahendra Highway H01, which crosses the Terai region from east to west and over Nepal's longest and widest river, the Ghaghara (also called Karnali) which ends in the Ganges. The Karnali Bridge is the only road bridge with a span of more than 300 meters in Nepal, the H01 highway like the other highways in the country, avoids major obstacles as much as possible, such as the many rivers resulting from melting snow of the Himalayas and overly mountainous areas which would require much more expensive infrastructure. The very underdeveloped railway network is an additional reason for the scarcity of major bridges other than footbridges in Nepal. This table presents the structures with spans greater than 100 metres (330 ft) (non-exhaustive list).

	Name	Nepali	Span	Length	Type	Carries Crosses	Opened	Location	Province	Ref.
1	Karnali Bridge	कर्णाली पुल	325 m (1,066 ft)	500 m (1,600 ft)	Cable-stayed; Steel truss deck, 1 steel pylon 325+175	Mahendra Highway; Ghaghara (Karnali)	1993	Chisapani; 28°38′28.5″N 81°16′59.8″E	Lumbini Province; Sudurpashchim Province	
2	Mugling Bridge	मुग्लिङमा पुल	125 m (410 ft)		Suspension; Steel truss deck, concrete pylons	Prithvi Highway; Trishuli River	1972	Mugling; 27°51′14.4″N 84°33′26.0″E	Gandaki Province; Bagmati Province	
3	Dudhkoshi Jayaramghat Bridge	दूध कोशी जयराम घाट पुल	122 m (400 ft)	150 m (490 ft)	Suspension; Steel truss deck, concrete pylons	Road bridge Jairam Ghat road Diktel road Dudh Koshi	2017	Thakle–Ainselu Kharka; 27°10′36.0″N 86°28′25.0″E	Province No. 1	
4	Arun River Bridge	अरुण लेगुवा पुल	120 m (390 ft)	120 m (390 ft)	Truss; Steel	Road bridge Arun River	2013	Leguwa–Jarayotar; 27°08′23.5″N 87°16′02.6″E	Province No. 1	
5	Sabha Khola Bridge	सभा खोला पुल	120 m (390 ft)	120 m (390 ft)	Truss; Steel	Road bridge Sabha River	2013	Tumlingtar; 27°17′20.1″N 87°12′46.1″E	Province No. 1	
6	New Mugling Bridge	मुग्लिन आर्क ब्रिज	120 m (390 ft)	160 m (520 ft)	Arch; Concrete deck arch	Prithvi Highway; Trishuli River	2019	Mugling; 27°51′16.7″N 84°33′26.6″E	Gandaki Province; Bagmati Province	

== Major footbridges ==
This table presents suspension footbridges with spans greater than 300 metres (980 ft) (non-exhaustive list).

	Name	Nepali	Span	Height	Type	Carries Crosses	Opened	Location	Province	Ref.
1	Gandaki Golden Footbridge	गण्डकी गोल्डेन झोलुङ्गे पुल	567 m (1,860 ft)	122 m (400 ft)	Simple suspension Steel, wind guy-wires	Footbridge; Gandaki River	2020	Kushma–Baglung District; 28°15′42.1″N 83°36′34.9″E	Gandaki Province	
2	Kushma Bungy Footbridge	कुश्मा बन्जी जम्पिङ	490 m (1,610 ft)	200 m (660 ft)	Simple suspension Steel	Footbridge; Gandaki River	2019	Kushma–Narayansthan; 28°13′21.1″N 83°40′21.5″E	Gandaki Province	(Note: According to the sources, the span would be between 490 and 520 metres (1,610 and 1,710 ft) and the height between 200 and 228 metres (656 and 748 ft).)
3	Kushma Mudikuwa Footbridge	कुश्मा मुडिकुवा पुल	359 m (1,178 ft)	117 m (384 ft)	Simple suspension Steel, wind guy-wires	Footbridge; Modi Khola	2016	Kushma–Mudikuwa; 28°12′07.4″N 83°40′21.3″E	Gandaki Province	(Note: The given height varies between 117 and 155 metres (384 and 509 ft).)
4	Triveni Garas Footbridge		350 m (1,150 ft)		Suspension; Steel	Footbridge; Kamala River	2010	Dudhauli–Katari Municipality; 26°55′43.8″N 86°15′54.6″E	Bagmati Province; Province No. 1	
5	Bunwajor Ghat II Footbridge		349 m (1,145 ft)		Suspension; Steel	Footbridge; Dudh Koshi	1996	Bopun–Chaudandi; 26°54′09.3″N 86°55′16.2″E	Province No. 1	
6	Kushma Balewa Bridge	कुश्मा बलेवा पुल	347 m (1,138 ft)	117 m (384 ft)	Simple suspension Steel, wind guy-wires	Footbridge; Gandaki River	2013	Kushma–Narayansthan; 28°12′16.5″N 83°40′17.3″E	Gandaki Province	(Note: Also known as Badagaun-Kaiyan Trail Bridge, the height is reported between 117 and 157 metres (384 and 515 ft).)
7	Shikha Kindu Trail Bridge		345 m (1,132 ft)		Suspended 'D'	Footbridge; Kali_Gandaki tributary	2024	Shikha,_Nepal; 28°26′34.93″N 83°40′37.65″E	Gandaki Province	(Note: David Sweet, "Shikha Kindu Trail Bridge With Plaque". JPG, October 15th, 2024. Wikimedia Commons, [[[Shikha-kindu-trail-bridge-with-plaque.jpg]] Shikha-kindu-trail-bridge-with-plaque.jpg].)
8	Kushma-Gyadi Footbridge	कुश्मा ग्यादी झोलुङ्गे पुल	344 m (1,129 ft)	117 m (384 ft)	Simple suspension Steel, wind guy-wires	Footbridge; Modi Khola	2010	Kushma; 28°12′33.6″N 83°40′42.1″E	Gandaki Province	(Note: According to the sources, the height would be between 117 and 135 metres (384 and 443 ft).)
9	Sheramalakot Footbridge		336 m (1,102 ft)		Suspension; Steel	Footbridge; Tadi River	2011			
10	Budhsingaratmate Footbridge		311 m (1,020 ft)		Simple suspension Steel	Footbridge; Trishuli River	2011	Ratmate–Budhsing; 27°51′28.2″N 85°03′28.6″E	Bagmati Province	
11	Leguwa Ghat Footbridge		310 m (1,020 ft)		Suspension; Steel	Footbridge; Arun River	1982	Leguwa–Jarayotar; 27°08′44.5″N 87°16′16.3″E	Province No. 1	

== See also ==
- Transport in Nepal
- Rail transport in Nepal
- List of roads in Nepal
- Geography of Nepal
- List of rivers of Nepal
- Annapurna Circuit

== Notes and references ==
- Notes
- Nicolas Janberg. "International Database for Civil and Structural Engineering". Structurae.com.
- Others references
- Images
