= Surunga =

Surunga सुरुंगा Kanakai
- Neighbourhood
- Location in Nepal
- Coordinates: 26.66°N 87.90°E
- Country: Nepal
- Province: Koshi province
- District: Jhapa District

Population (1991)
  - Total: 16,747
- Time zone: UTC+5:45 (Nepal Time)
- Area code: 23

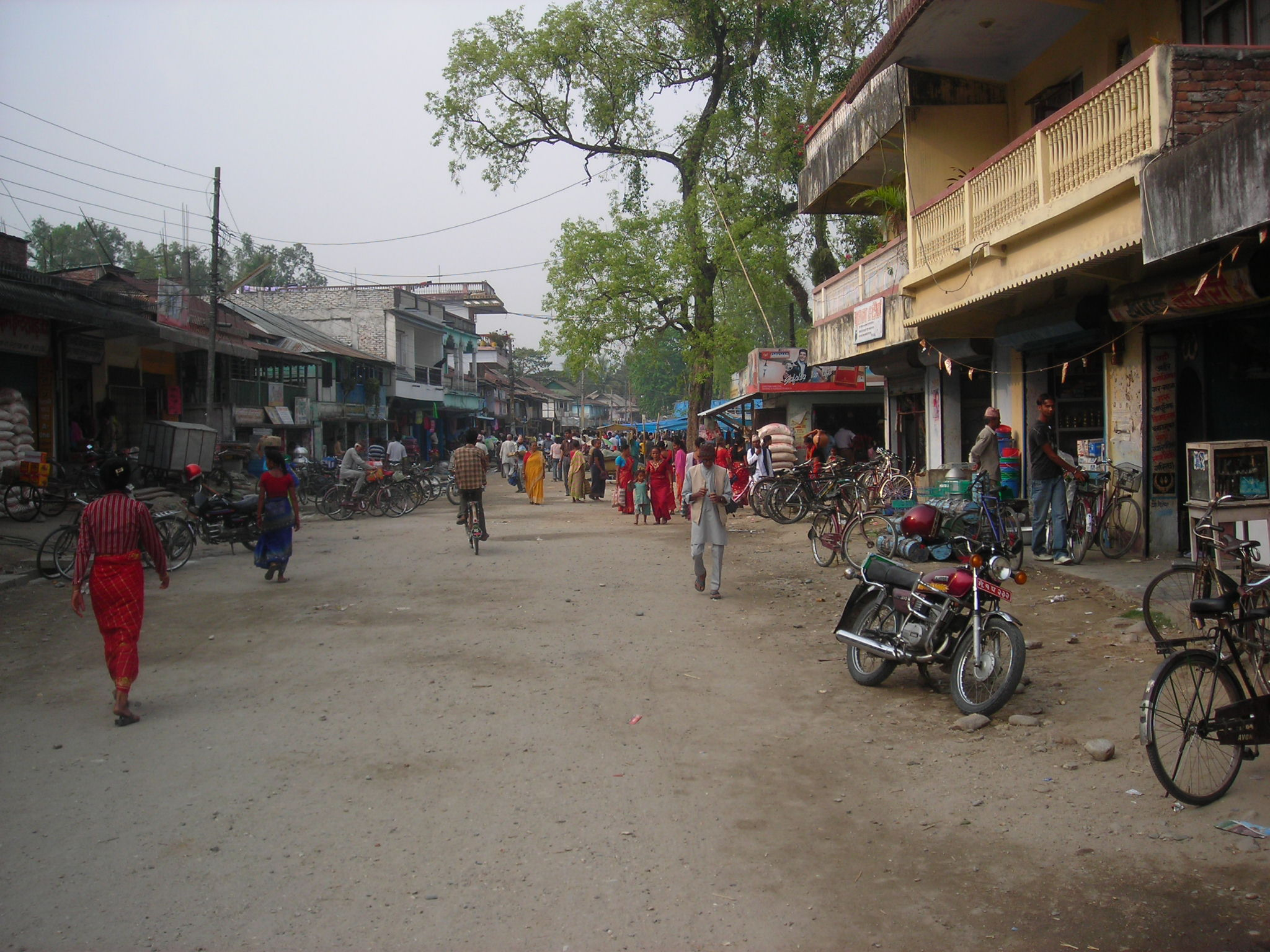
Surunga Bazaar, Jhapa, Nepal.

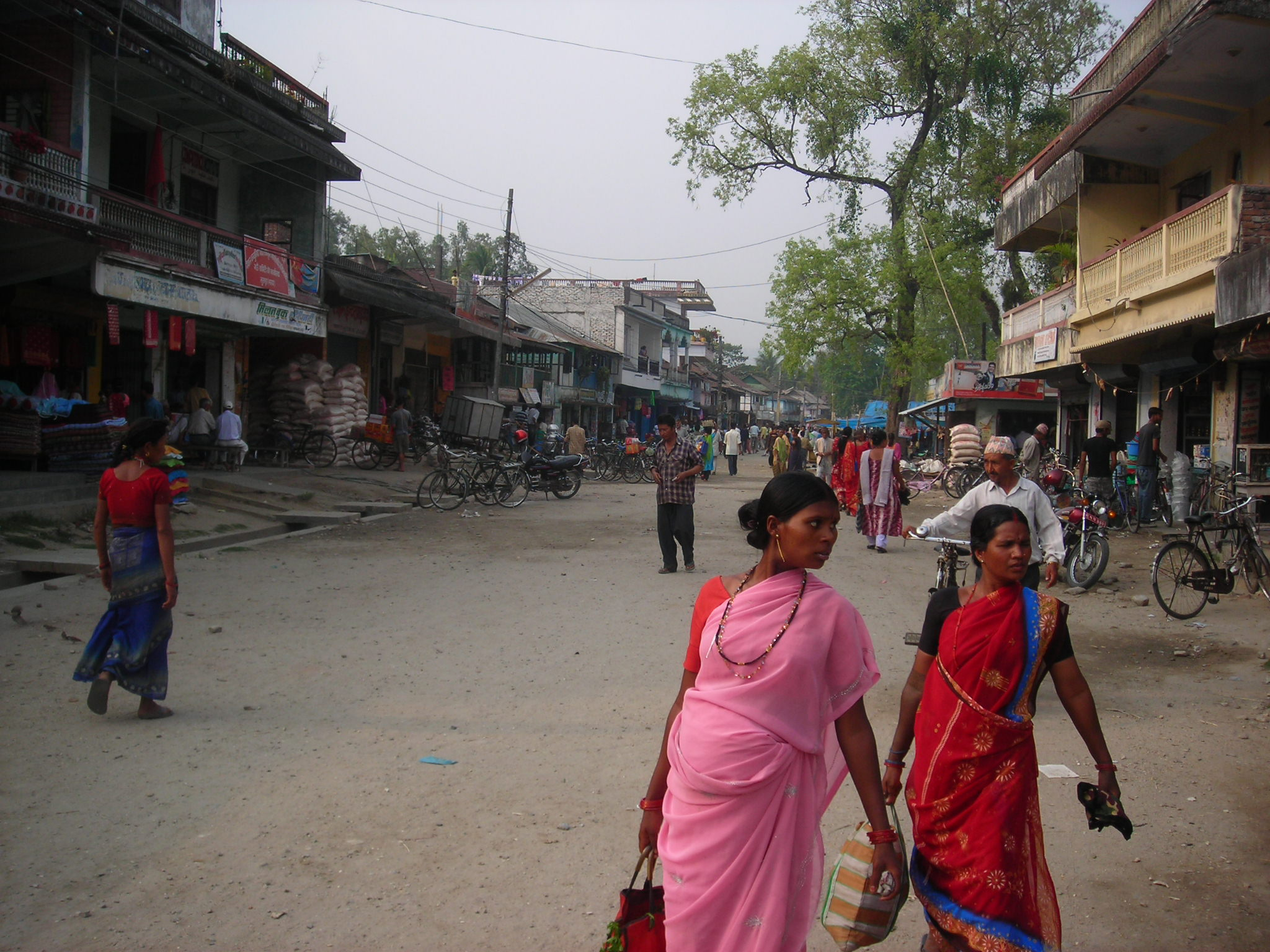
Surunga Bazaar on weekly Saturday haat in Jhapa, Nepal.

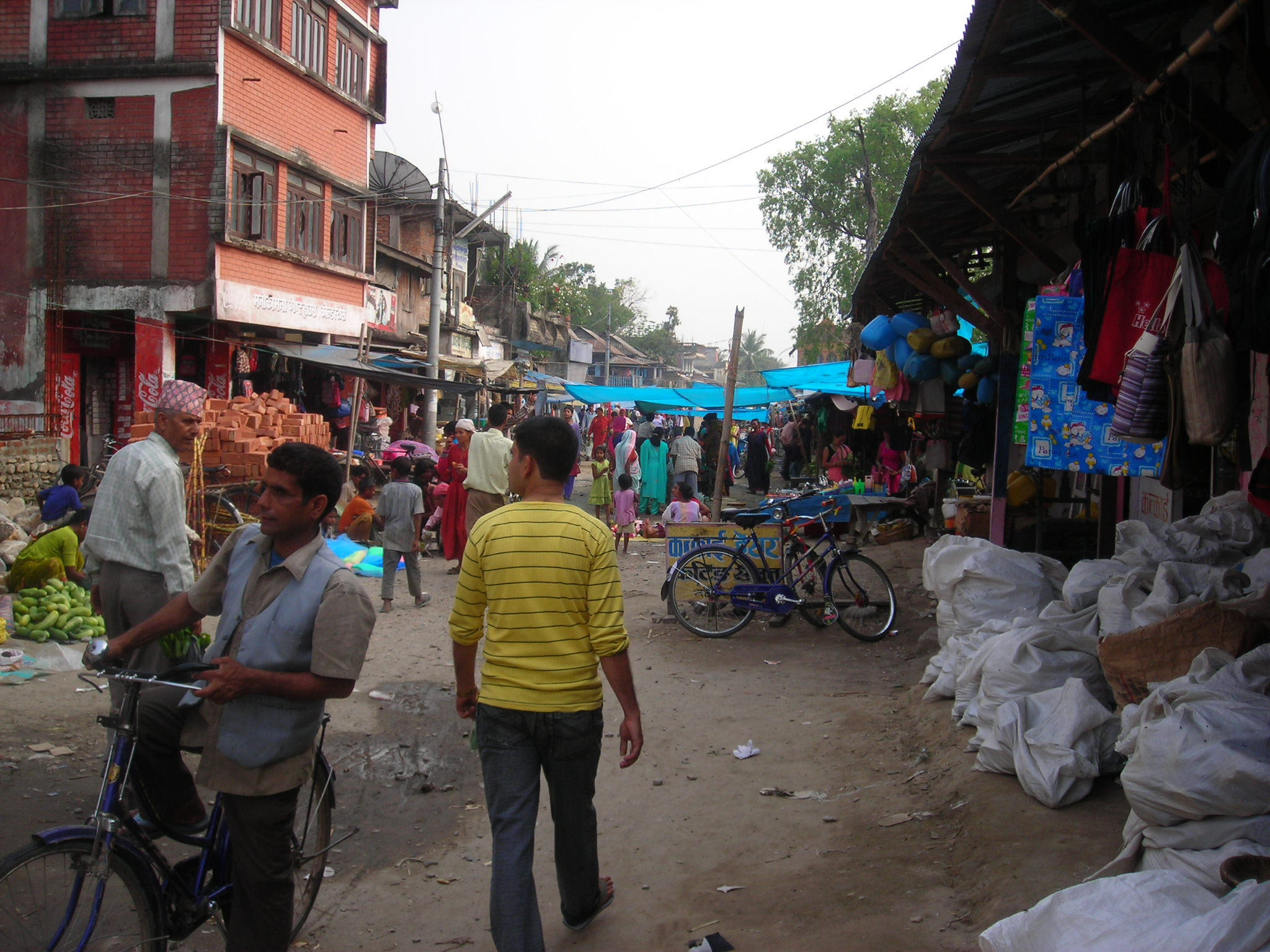
Surunga Bazaar on weekly Saturday haat in Jhapa, Nepal.

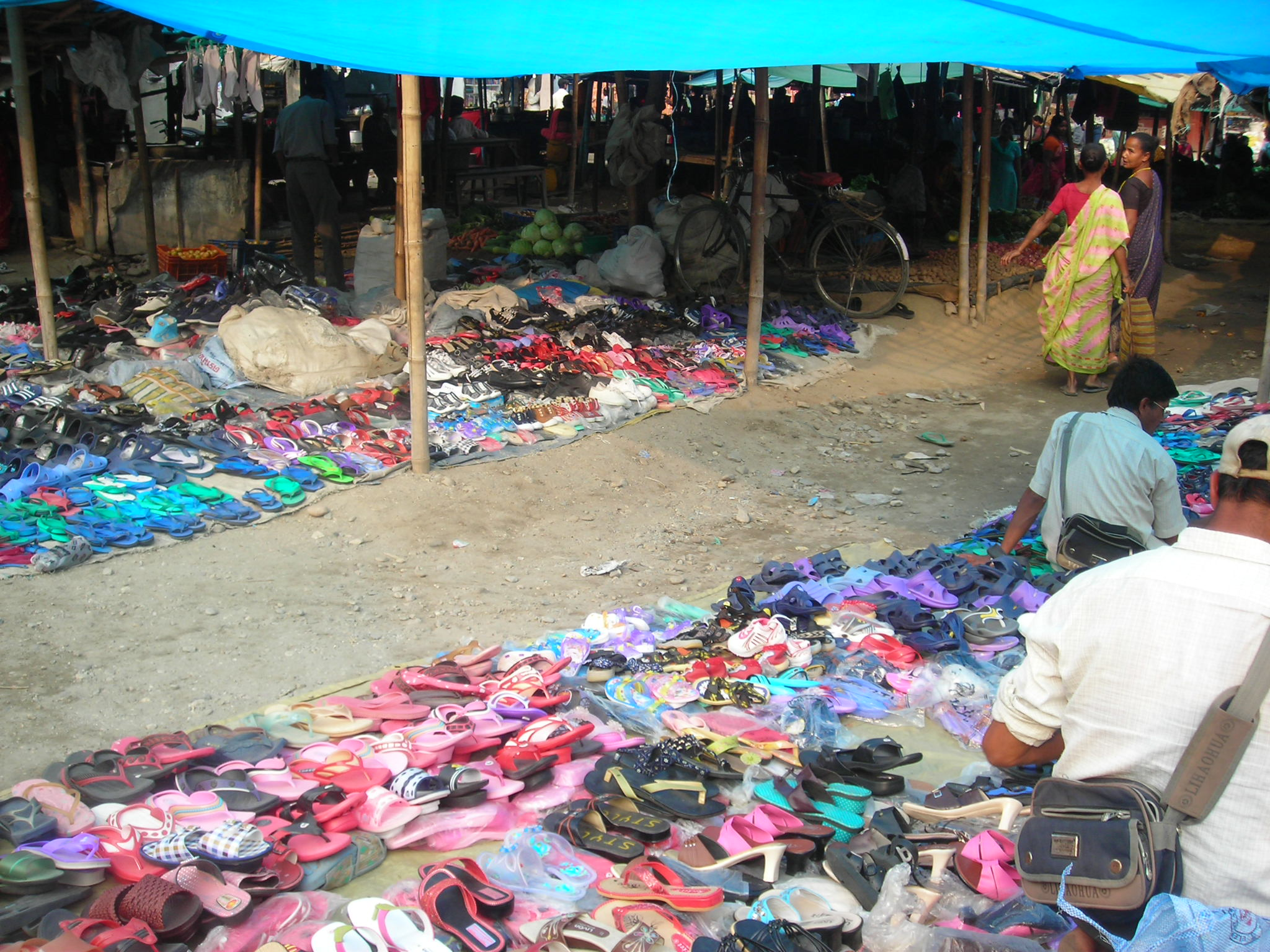
Street shops at Surunga Bazaar on weekly Saturday haat.

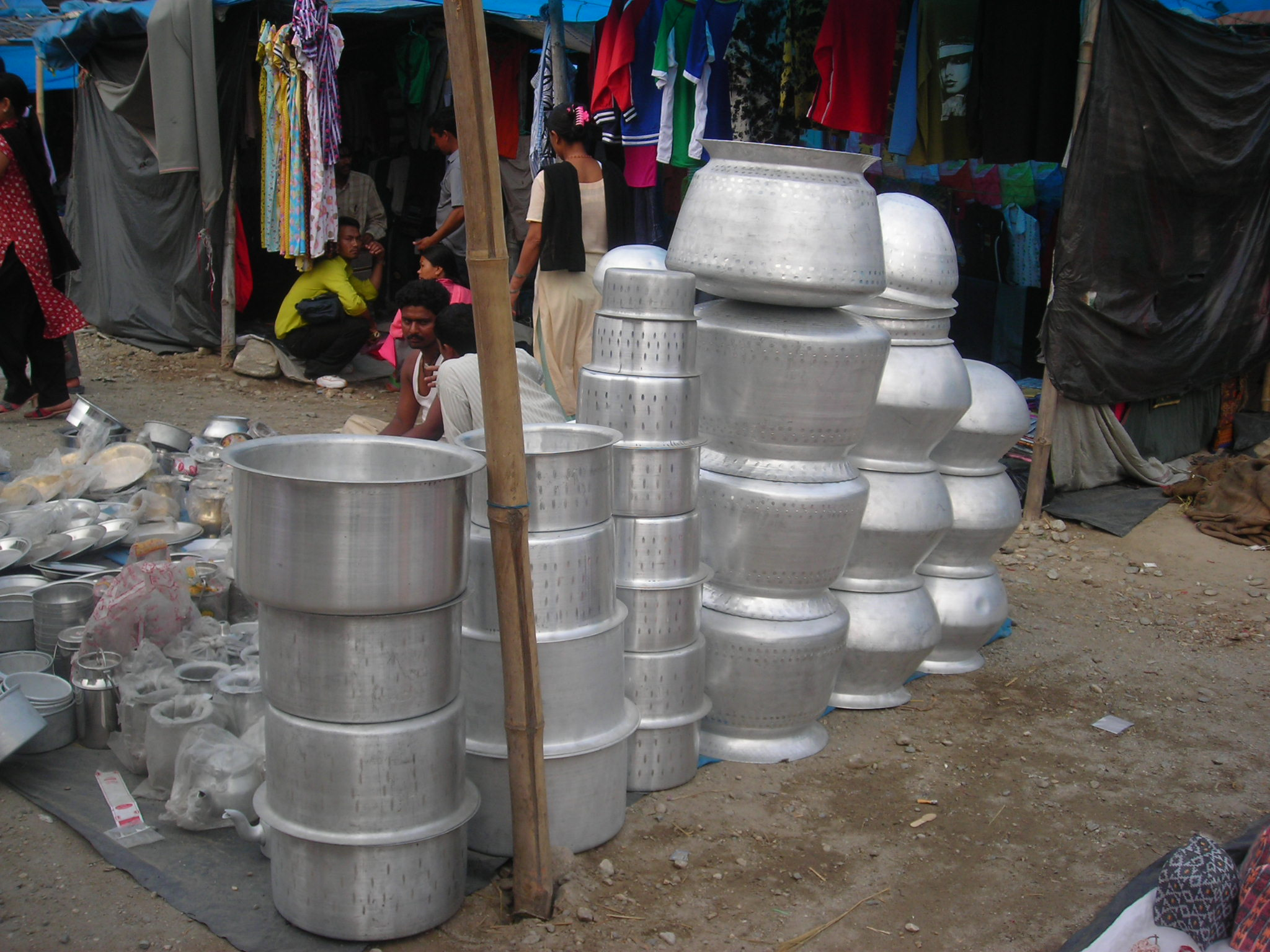
Utensils shops at Surunga Bazaar on weekly Saturday haat.

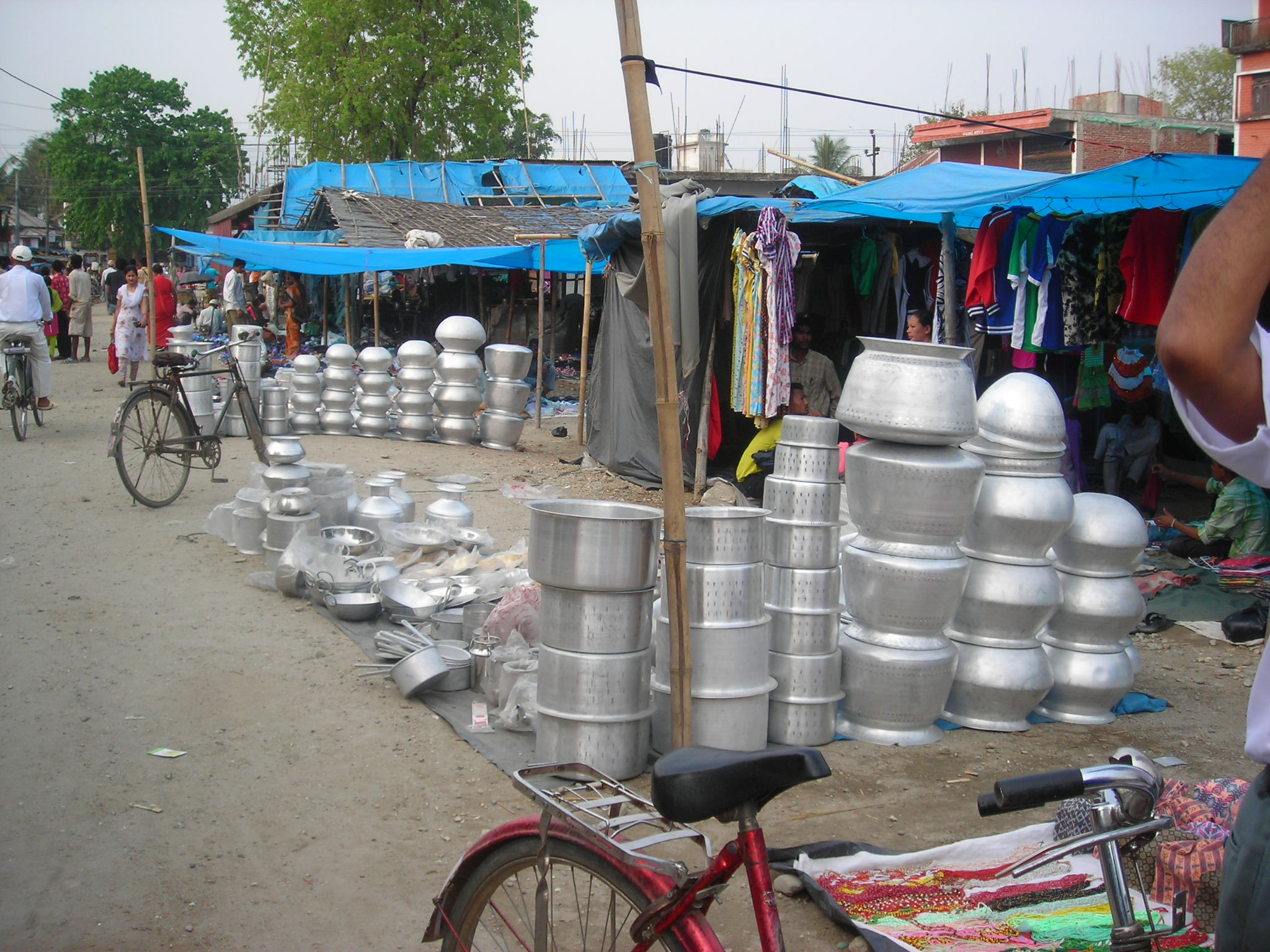
Utensils shops at Surunga Bazaar on weekly Saturday haat.

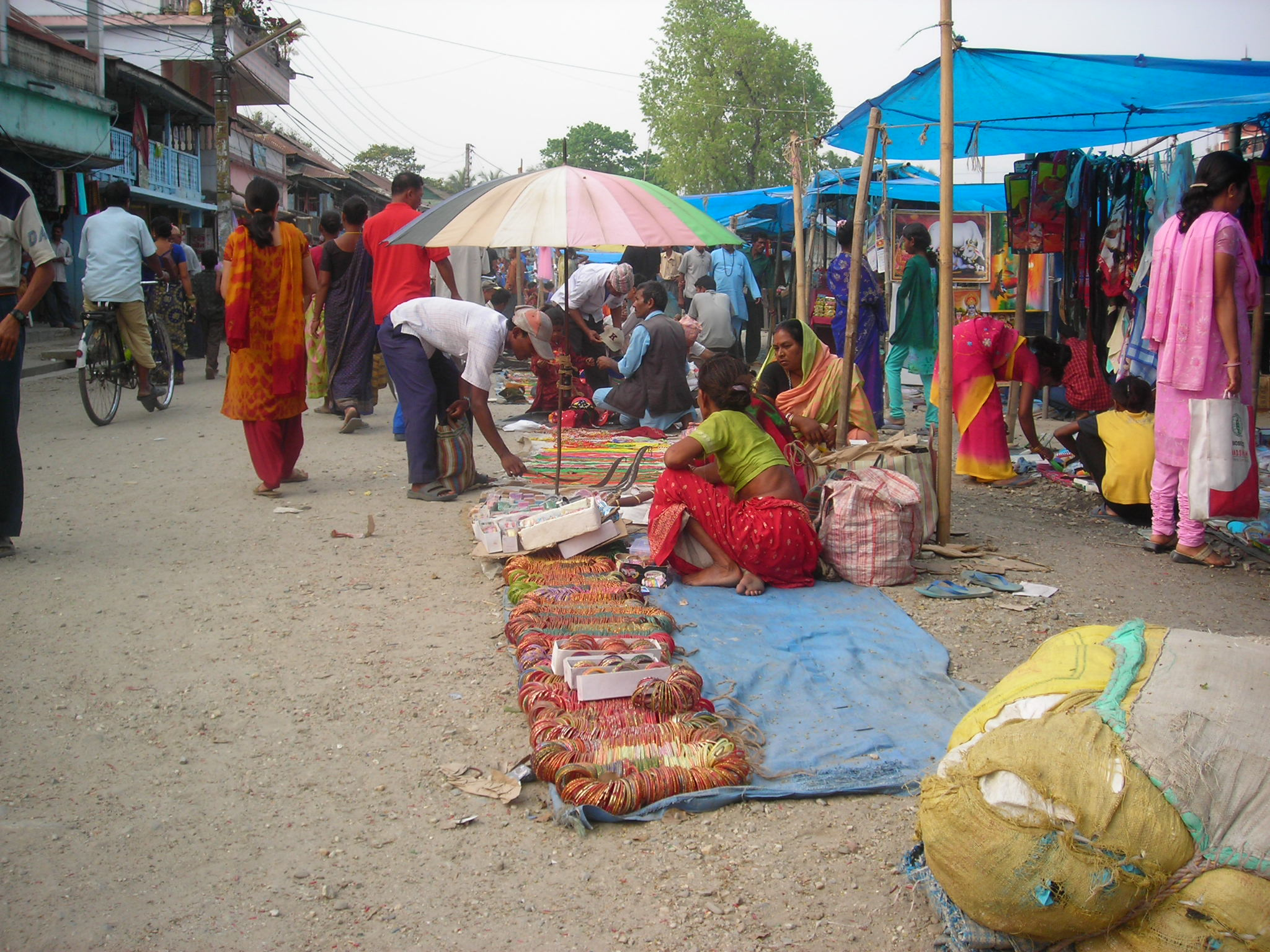
Street shops at Surunga Bazaar on weekly Saturday haat.

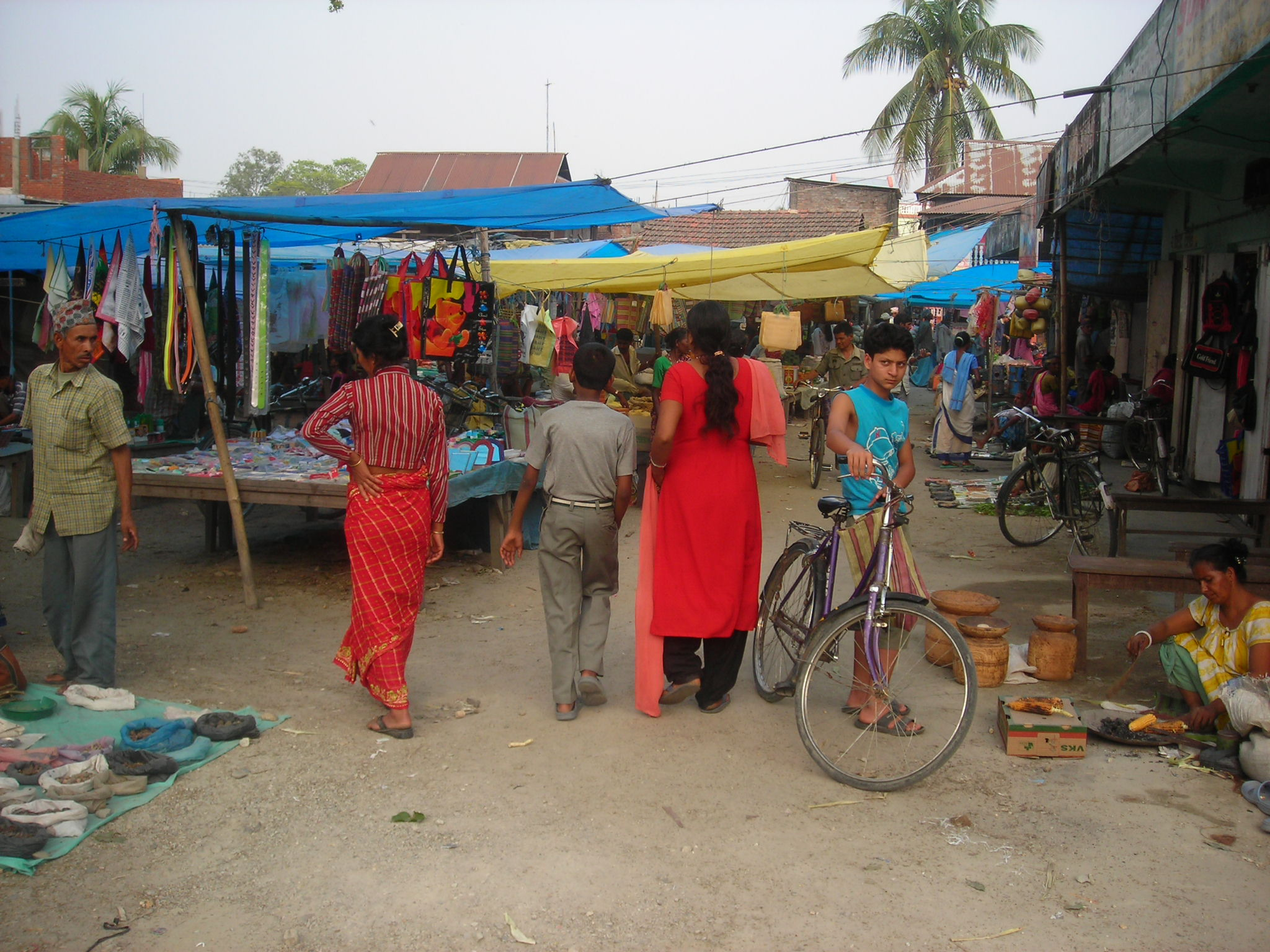
People in Street shops at Surunga Bazaar on weekly Saturday haat.

Surunga is a trade center of located in Kankai Municipality in Jhapa District, Koshi Province of south-eastern Nepal. At the time of the 1991 Nepal census, it had a population of 16,747 people living in 2996 individual households. Surunga is a rapidly developing town in Jhapa district. It is situated on the bank of the Kankai River (also called the Kankai Mai by locals).

== Geography ==
It is bordered by Ilam district on the north mostly while it also shares a border with Khudnabari VDC, Kankai river flows to its west (on the western bank of which lie Shivasatakshi), to the east lies Ghailadubba and Arjundhara VDCs and at the south it is surrounded by Sharnamati and Dangibari VDCs. Being one of the few villages in Jhapa through which East-west Highway runs also makes the village one of the most important towns in the region. It has significant religious importance due to its being on the bank of Kankai river where the famous Koti Hom Religious Area is situated.

Surunga was named after its historical meaning: Surung (Tunnel). It is believed that five brothers from Hindu mythology mahabharat along with their mother kunti escaped from the palace and finally reached Surunga underground.

== Population ==
Estimated population in 2001 census was around 17,000 but currently this could be around 35,000 with a large influx of people from different villages of Eastern hills and various parts of India. Ethnicities in Surunga are Brahmin, Chhetri, Satar, Kami, Damai, Newar, Bhujel, Tamang, Agrawal, Rajbanshi, Dhimal, Sarki, Magar, Rai and Limbu among others. Out of all the ethnicities, Satar and Rajbanshi are underprivileged in Surunga.

== Education ==
In Surunga is located the government-run Kankai Madhyamik Vidyalaya, which caters for around 3,000 students every year not only from Surunga but also from surrounded villages. The boarding schools are Shree Pashupati English Secondary School, Shree Harikul Model Higher Secondary School, Paragon Academy Secondary School, Champa Flowers Academy, Jhapa Marigold English School, Mai valley English School, Dibya Ratna English Secondary School, Shree Banubajha English school (Surunga 7), Janaki primary school (Surunga 8), Devkota Education Foundation and Hamro Pathashala.

There are other primary boarding schools in Surunga. For higher education, Kankai Multiple Campus is running courses for certificate, bachelors and masters levels. Shree Harikul Model Higher Secondary School also runs higher secondary education also known as 10+2.

Kankai Higher Secondary School is the pioneer school in Surunga. It also runs classes in symbolic language up to grade 10 for hearing-impaired students.

== Economy ==
Surunga's main economy rests on agriculture. However, now remittance, local businesses and tourism also contribute significant amount to the economy of Surunga village. In recent times, real estate business is also a vital means of economic activities. The cost of land is increasing each day making about 10 million for one Katha in main points of Surunga. It contains a group of A-graded banks certified by Nepal Rastra Bank (NRB) which includes NRB, Agricultural Development Bank (ADBL), BiratLaxmi Development Bank, Excel Development Bank, Sunrise Bank, NMC Jhapa, Prithivi Saving and Credit Society. Simultaneously a group of 'saving and credit' companies are also working. Leading among them is Bhagwati Saving and Credit Pvt Limited which has more than 400 share members.

Koti Hom (a hom ritual in Hindu religion) was conducted by late yogi Naraharinath, a Hindu yogi and philosopher, in 1985. Now Koti Hom is going to be developed as a tourist place. Movie filming and photography can be done there paying a little charge in KotiHom Dharmik Sthal Bikash Samiti (a committee which manages the Koti Hom area). A place for trekking freaks called jhandi dada (झन्दी डाँडा) is located in the border of Surunga which is shared with Illam.

=== No bandas ===
Surunga is one of the best place for business opportunities because of its anti-strike stance. It is one of the most important educational and business centers in the region. No political parties, ethnic groups or professional organization has been able to shut down Surunga bazaar over the last few years. Defying all manner of bandas, Surunga has earned a reputation as the country's only anti-banda town. The locals say Surunga bazaar has not been closed down even for a single day in the last six years. According to District Traffic Police Office Jhapa, the district has seen shutdowns for 31 days in the last two years. But, no banda has had any impact in Surunga. In the past, the locals of Surunga have even chased away political party cadres trying to shut down the bazaar by force. Due to this reason trade is easy in Surunga.

== Religious and touristic sites ==
Surunga is famous for Kotihome religious site that lies on the westernmost point of the VDC. Every year hundreds of thousands of devotees flock to this area to worship. The most remarkable occasion is Makar Sankranti when Maghe Mela is organized which is attended by thousands of people from as far as Biratnagar, Dharan, Itahari, Ilam, Kakarvitta and Indian states of West Bengal (mostly Darjeeling and Jalpaiguri), southern Bhutan and Assam.

Domukha is a tourist destination in the eastern part of Nepal. Kankai river flows through the Chure range of hills, comes and reaches the plains of Terai region. Because of the Domukha Dam that was constructed to build Kankai Nahar (channel), there's a huge reservoir of water which is serene and clear most of the year. Many youngsters visit this place for picnic, field visit, excursions and simply to cool off from the scorching heat. Domukha is also a connecting point to Surunga for people living in high hills and southern Ilam. According to mythology, around this area used to be the palace of Kirant King in the history.

Dhanushkoti Dham emerged as a local pilgrimage and recreational site, associated in Hindu tradition with the meditation of Arjuna from the Mahabharata. Located on the opposite bank of the Damukha area, the site attracts both religious visitors and tourists.

Kankai Bridge: The bridge over the Kankai river is one of the long concrete bridge in the country and measures 703 meters. The longest barrage/dam is on Koshi River and the longest bailey bridge is on Mahakali River connecting rest of Nepal to the 2 Nepali villages beyond Mahakali called Chandani and Dodhara villages.

Jamunkadhi Simsar, where many animals like deer, pythons, bears, sambar deer and porcupine are protected, is also located in this VDC.

A park named Happy Land has been established recently and is gaining popularity among the local tourists. The park is located on the bank of Sankha Khola, approximately 1 km north from the town.

== Health services ==
Surunga has a government-run primary health care center that is staffed by a medical doctor, health assistant, AHW, nurses and other helpers. The PHC also has vaccination center for snake bite which is a highly prevalent condition in the region especially from the Cobra and Krait. Besides, there are a lot of pharmacy stores like Sitaula Pharmacy, Pradhan Medical, Asmita Medical etc. that mostly sell medicines to the people and also provide consultation related to medical conditions with the help of medical doctors who rotate on hourly basis. Recently, Marigold Hospital and Sidhakali Hospital have been set up to cater to the growing health needs of the people. However, there is no medical institution in Surunga that can provide inpatient services to the people. When they have major health problems, the citizens of Surunga have to either go to Damak, a bigger city in western Jhapa that has AMDA clinic or to Dharan BPKIHS where the largest medical institution of Eastern Nepal is situated. Some of the people also travel as far as Siliguri, second largest city in West Bengal state of India for better treatment. People also travel to Kathmandu for treatment.

Drinking water: Surunga has drinking water supply that is collected from underground water and treated before distributed to the taps in every house. This was constructed by the initiative of local people and support from the district development committee. The drinking water project covers most parts of the VDC. It is also ranked one of the best drinking water service in the Eastern Region of Nepal. Prior to this, people used to drink tube well water which wasn't treated before drinking and contained a lot harmful minerals for health including arsenic that is linked with cancers and other skin conditions.

== Media ==
To promote local culture, Surunga has an FM radio station named Radio Sandesh - 103.9 MHz, which is run by a public library (Kankai pustakalaya) and is also registered as a Community radio.

== Organizations ==
Amongst many: Surunga Cooperate Youth Club, Sahkarya Sarthi Samuha, Surunga Jaycees, Sahakarya girls group, Sahakarya child Group, Youth Forum Surunga, Gayan Joti Yuwa club and Bal Club.
