= Dodhara Chandani Bridge =

Bridge in Kanchanpur district, Nepal

Dodhara Chandani Bridge दोधारा चाँदनी पुल
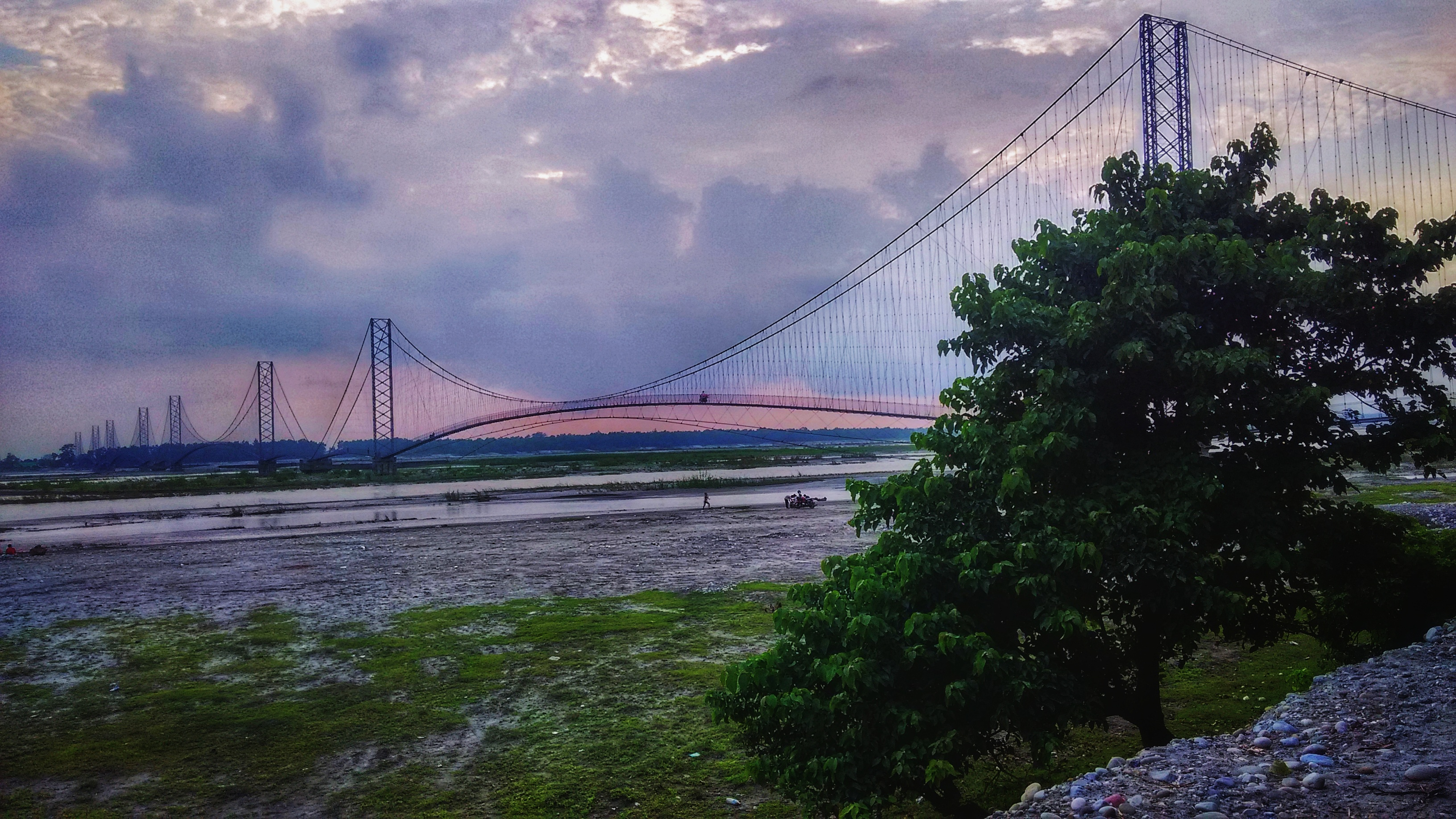
- Coordinates: 28°55′21.52″N 80°6′30.08″E
- Crosses: Mahakali River aka Sharda River
- Locale: Dodhara Chandani, Kanchanpur district, Nepal
- Official name: Dodhara Chandani Multispan Pedestrian Bridge
- Owner: Government of Nepal

Characteristics
- Total length: 1452.96 m
- Width: 1.6 m
- Longest span: 225.40 m

History
- Opened: 2005

Location
- Interactive map of Dodhara Chandani Bridge

The Dodhara Chandani Bridge (Nepali: दोधारा चाँदनी पुल), also known as Mahakali Bridge is a suspension bridge for pedestrians and at this point only about 1452.5 m long over Mahakali River in the Sudurpaschim Province of Nepal.

The bridge was damaged on 30 September, 2026 after one of the pillars collapsed due to rising of water level in Mahakali River, which has completely halted the movement across the bridge.

== Location ==
One of the longest multi-span Pedestrian bridge in Nepal is located in the Kanchanpur district, Sudurpaschim Province, Nepal. It connects the two villages Dodhara and Chandani separated by the Mahakali River in Kanchanpur District. The bridge in the Nepalese territory connects Dodhara Chandani near Indo-Nepal border cut off by the river.

The bridge is located about 12km Southwest of Bhimdatta Municipality (until 2008 known as Mahendranagar), 8 km below the Mahakali Dam and 5.5 km south and below India. South and downriver is the Indian border around 11.4 km away.

== Description ==
The Dodhara Chandani Bridge is a sequence of four suspension bridges with eight pylons, which are anchored to large anchor blocks on both banks as well as three common anchor blocks in the river bed. The lands between the 32.72-metre-high (107.3 ft) pylons have a wingspan of 225.40 m, the webs between the anchors and the pylons have a wingspan of almost 70 meters. The bridge segments are curved slightly upwards. The result is a series of arches of spans of 70 + 225.40 + 70 + 70 + 70 + 70 + 225.40 + 225.40 + 70 + 70 + 70 + 225.40 with a total length of 1452.96 m plus of approximately 20 m long anchor blocks on the banks.

The bridge consists of the steel pylons and essentially of wire ropes. The hangers are thin metal rods, which are connected to each other with eyes. The 1.60-metre-wide (5.2 ft) bridge deck is a sturdy metal grille. On both sides serve ropes as handrails, which are connected by wire mesh with the bridge deck. Diagonal cables between the railings and the underlying longitudinal cables are used for stiffening, as well as some stay cables of the pylons for the bridge deck. Side, anchored in the riverbed ropes dampen fluctuations.

The bridge is designed as a pedestrian bridge, but bicycles and motorcycles can use the bridge as well. There is enough room so that motorcycles can pass even if they are fully loaded. All traffic travels on the left-hand side, as everywhere else in Nepal.

== See also ==
- Baglung Parbat Footbridge
- Karnali Bridge
- Narayani Bridge
- Sankhamul Bridge
- Sino-Nepal Friendship Bridge
