= Dodhara Chandani =

Municipality in Sudurpashchim Province, Nepal

Dodhara Chandani दोधारा चाँदनी
- Municipality
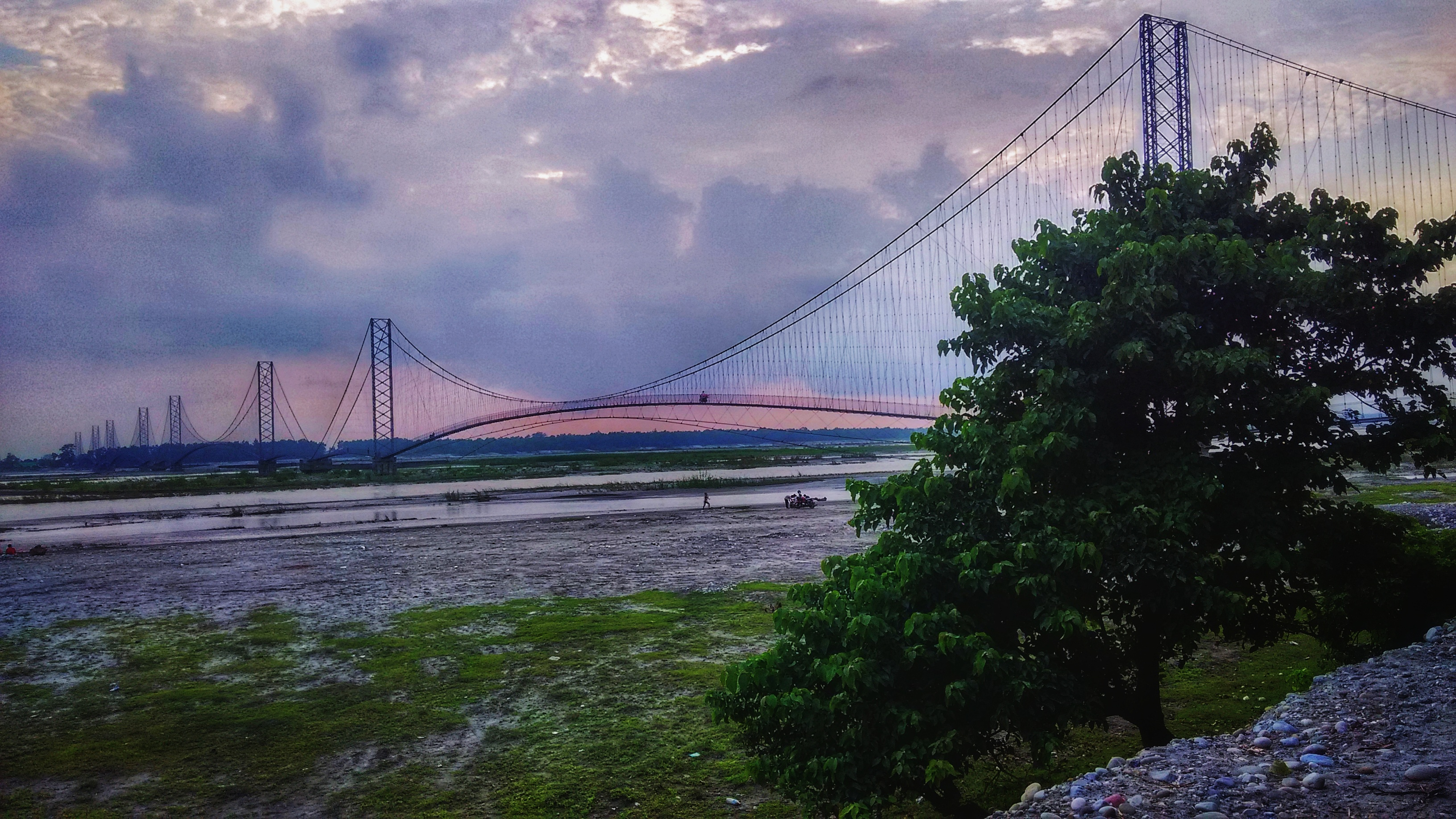

- Location in Nepal
- Coordinates (Dodhara-Chandani): 28°54′3″N 80°5′13″E
- Country: Nepal
- Province: Sudurpashchim Province
- District: Kanchanpur
- Established: 18 May 2014
- Incorporated (VDC): Dodhara and Chandani

Government
  - Mayor: Kishore Kumar Limbu (CPN (UML))
  - Deputy Mayor: Ganga Devi Joshi (Nepali Congress)

Area
  - Total: 56.84 km^{2} (21.95 sq mi)

Population (2021)
  - Total: 42,974
  - Density: 756.1/km^{2} (1,958/sq mi)
- 2021 Nepal census
- Time zone: UTC+5:45 (Nepal Time)
- Area code: +977
- Website: dodharachandanimun.gov.np

Dodhara Chandani (Nepali: दोधारा-चाँदनी) is a municipality in the Kanchanpur District of Sudurpashchim Province, Nepal. It was established on December 2, 2014, by merging the former Village development committees, Dodhara and Chandani. It is the only Nepali territory that lies across the Mahakali river, virtually separated from mainland Nepal, and is famously known as Mahakali Pari Ko Desh. It is surrounded by India on three sides (north, west and south) and cut off by a river on the east.

== Geography ==
It is located in the Kanchanpur District of Sudurpashchim Province. It borders Uttarakhand to the north and west, Uttar Pradesh to the south, and Bhimdatta municipality and Shuklaphanta National Park to the east. The municipality is located in the inner Terai region. It is a flat, fertile plain with an elevation ranging from 175 meters to 225 meters above sea level. The municipality is nestled along the banks of the volatile Mahakali River and historically highly vulnerable to seasonal floods.

== Governance ==
The municipality was formed by merging the villages of Dodhara and Chandani, on 18 May 2014 and was named Dodhara Chandani Municipality, it is divided into 10 different wards, with its administrative office located in Ward No. 6.

In 2017, the municipality was renamed to Mahakali after the eponymous Mahakali River. The renaming was highly criticized by the locals, citing that the name carries massive historical and geographical weight and would erase their unique identity. On December 28, 2020, the cabinet meeting decided to change its name to Dodhara Chandani.

== Demographics ==
At the time of the 2021 Nepal census, the population was 42,974 people living in 9,610 households.

In terms of language, 53.9% spoke Nepali, 24.4% Doteli, 8.5% Bajureli, 4.7% Baitadeli, 4.4% Bajhangi, 1.3% Magar, 0.9% Achhami, 0.6% Dailekhi, 0.2% Gurung, 0.1% Darchuleli, 0.1% Hindi, 0.1% Limbu, 0.1% Maithili and 0.6% other languages as their first language.

In terms of ethnicity/caste, 34.8% were Chhetri, 22.9% Kami, 10.1% Hill Brahmin, 8.9% Magar, 7.2% Thakuri, 5.2% Damai/Dholi, 1.9% Sanyasi/Dasnami, 1.8% Gurung, 1.8% Sarki, 1.7% other Dalit, 1.4% Lohar, 0.8% Badi, 0.3% Kumal, 0.3% Newar, 0.1% Bengali, 0.1% Limbu, 0.1% Rai, 0.1% other Terai, 0.1% Thami and 0.1% others.

In terms of religion, 97.7% were Hindu, 1.7% Buddhist, 0.4% Christian, 0.1% Baháʼí and 0.1% others.

In terms of literacy, 70.7% could read and write, 1.8% could only read and 27.5% could neither read nor write.

Many Dodhara and Chandani people migrated from Hill Region. Most people migrated from Dadeldhura, Baitadi, Bajhang, Bajura, Doti etc. districts.

== Education ==
The Bhanu Multiple Campus is the only Bachelor-level campus. There are a total of 42 community schools in the municipality which includes both affiliated to Government of Nepal and as well as managed by private sector.

== Infrastructure ==
The municipality is home to Dodhara Chandani Bridge, which spans across the Mahakali river. The bridge is about 1496.5 meters long, connecting Dodhara and Chandani.

The 4 lane paved motorable bridge over the Mahakali River connects the Dodhara Chandani municipality to other parts of the country.

== Telecommunications ==
Ncell and Nepal Telecom (NTC) are the main telecommunication services, while NTC offers broadband connections. Internet providers like Worldlink, Subisu, Tech mide are provides Hi-Speed Fibre Connection.

== Health ==
Dodhara Chandani Hospital is the main hospial of the municipality which provies basic healthcare and health insurance services. Sub-Health Posts and ward clinics also provide primary services at every ward in the municipality.

== See also ==
- Dodhara
- Chandani
