= Laxmipur, Jhapa =

City in Kankai Municipality, Nepal

Laxmipur is a small town in Jhapa District of Province No. 1 in Nepal. It covers about 3.16 km² (1.22 mi²) area and distance of 7.08 km (4.40 mi). It is situated in Kankai Municipality between Biring khola to the west and Ghagra khola to the east. The main occupations of the residents are shopkeeping and farming. The nearest market is Bibhare bazar, which is only open on Thursdays. Holy basil, Pathibhara, Himal are the nearest school and education center.
