= Jamunkhadi Simsar =

- Tourist attractions
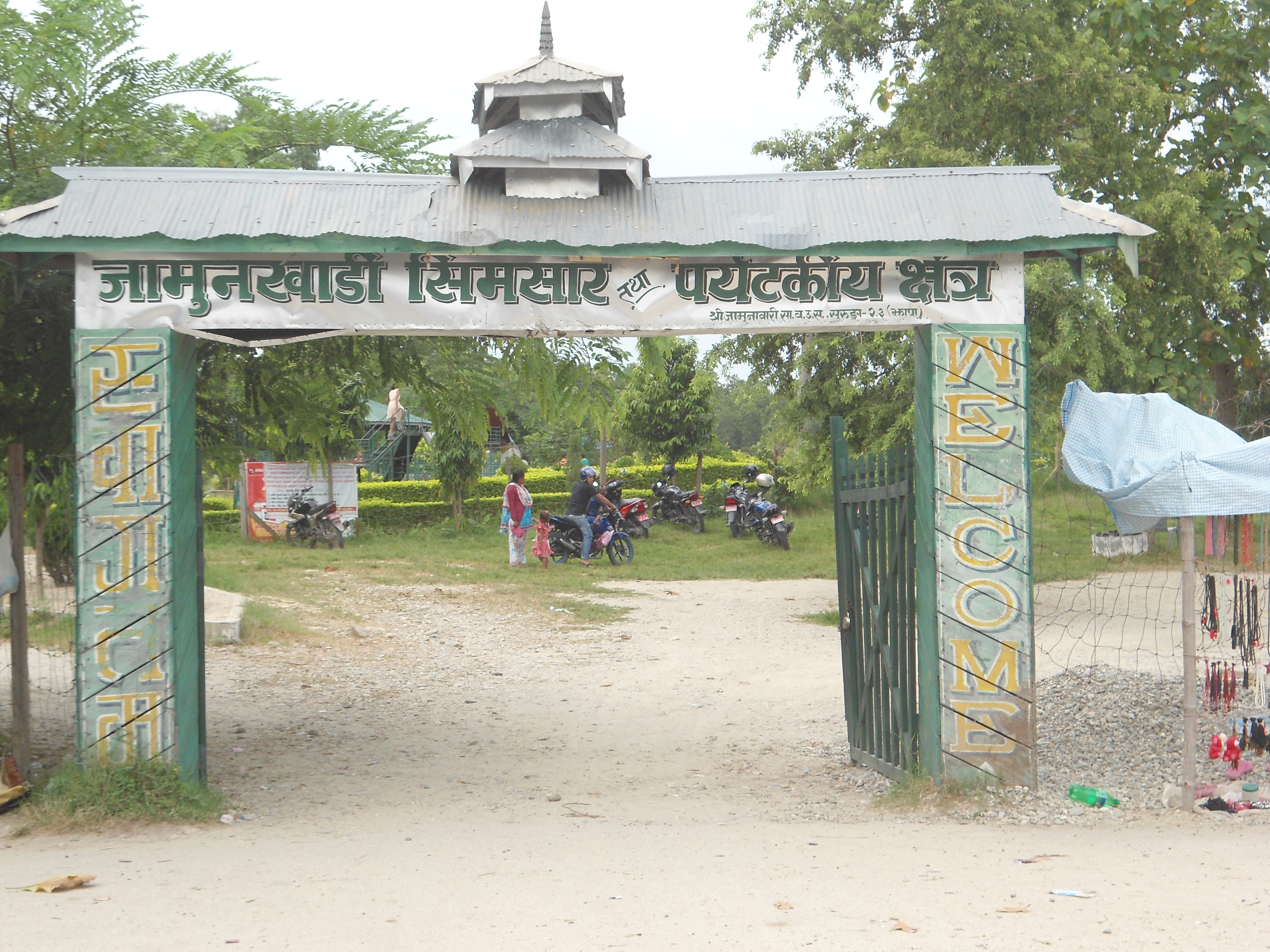
- Gate to wetlands area

- Jamunkhadi in map of Nepal
- Coordinates: 26°39′5.5″N 87°54′46″E
- country: Nepal
- zone: Mechi zone
- District: Jhapa District

The Jamunkhadi Simsar or Jamunkhadi Wetlands is a wetlands conservation project in Kankai Municipality of Jhapa District, in eastern Nepal.

It was created to be developed as a tourist destination in Wards 2 and 5 of Surunga VDC (which are now the Dandagau area of Kankai), within the community forest. It lies about a kilometer away from the East-West Highway and occupies an area of about 10 hectares of the 25-hectare community forest. Originally, it included twin ponds named after the rivers Ganga (Ganges) and Jamuna, but due to lack of protection, Ganga dried up. The remaining Jamuna pond is a tourist attraction, with boating and fishing. Wild animals such as the python, bear, sambar, and porcupine are protected in this area.

== Tourism ==
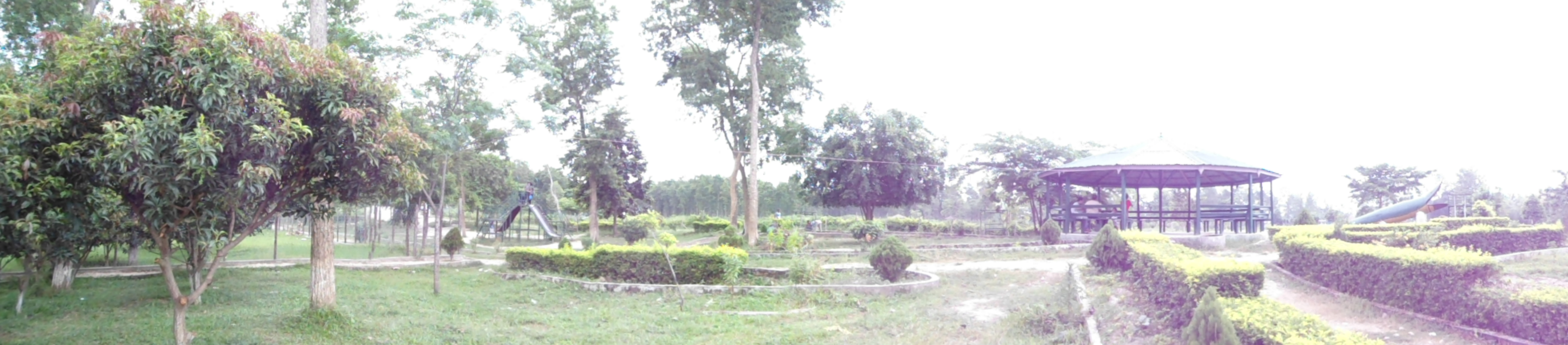
