= Kotihome =

Kotihom/Kankai Dham
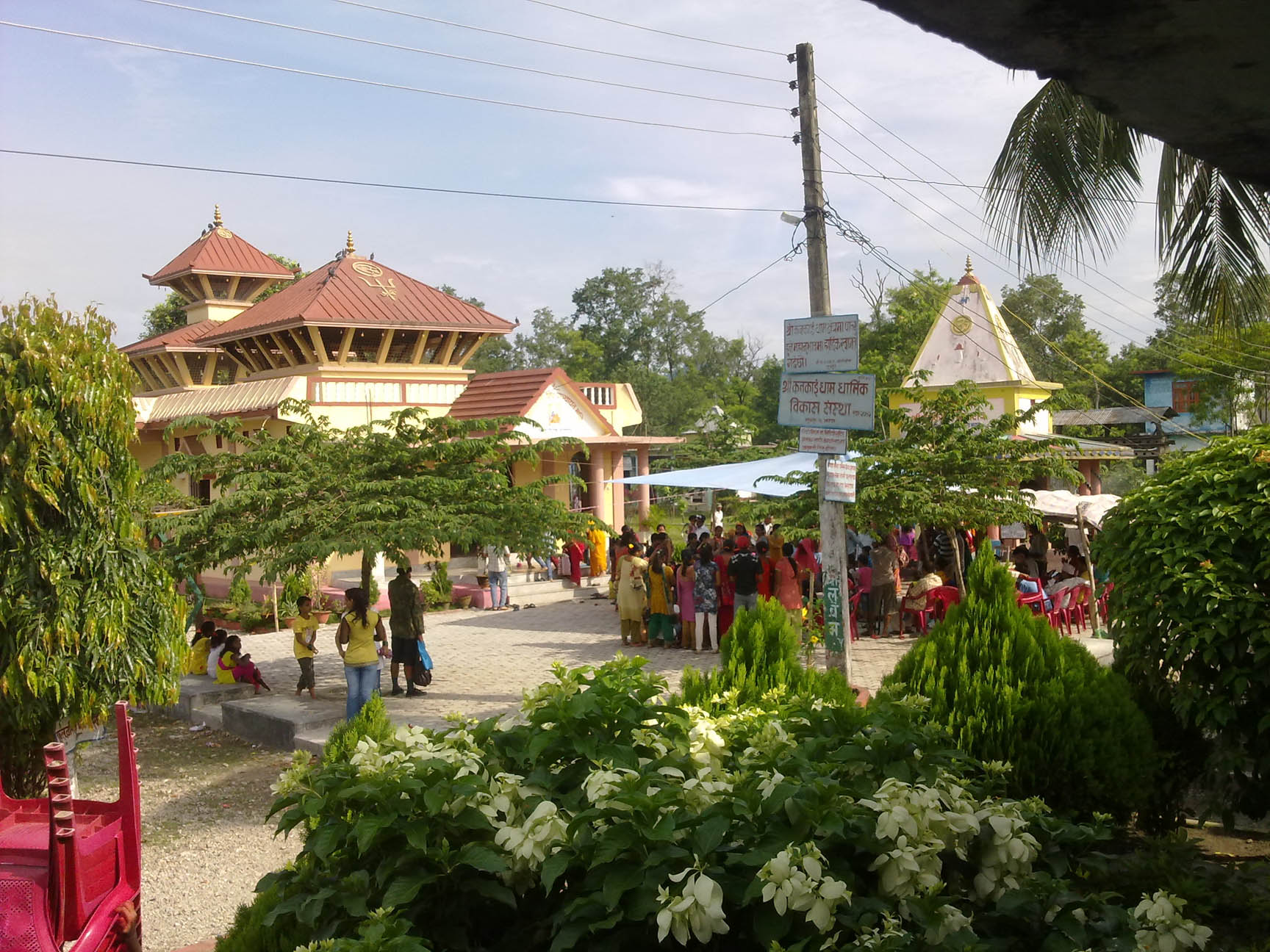
- Kotihom/Kankai Dham

- Kotihom in a map of Nepal

Religion
- Affiliation: Hinduism
- District: Jhapa
- Deity: Mahadev
- Festivals: Sivaratri, Balachaturdasi, Teej, Rama Navami, Janai Purnima, Buddha jayanti

Location
- Location: Surunga, Jhapa District
- State: Mechi zone
- Country: Nepal
- Coordinates: 26°39′18″N 87°52′42″E

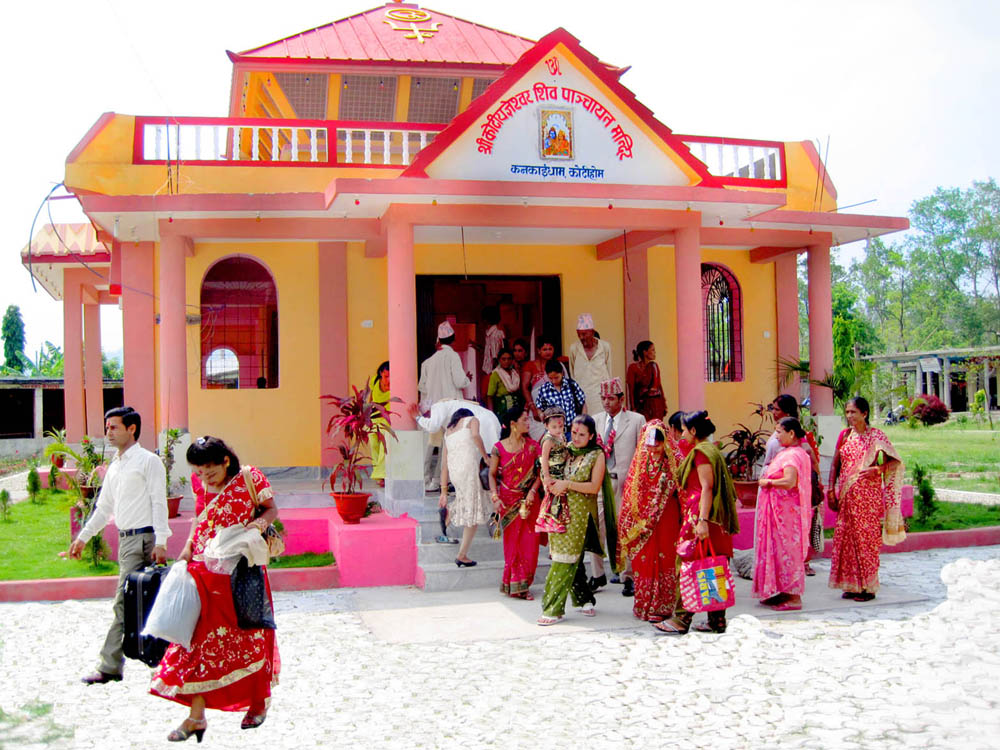
main temple of Kotihom

Kotihom Dham is a religious site in Eastern Development Region, Nepal. It is located in the Kankai Municipality of Jhapa District. It is also known as Kankai Mai and Kankai Dham.

== History ==
For a long time, many people have worshipped at the Kankai River, in the belief it will grant their wishes. In the same way, in Poush of 2042 B.S. a great worship was done whole month in the leadership of yogi Narharinath. After that, this place developed into one of the religious sites of Nepal.
