= Kankai Municipality =

Kankai Municipality कन्काई नगरपालिका
- Location within Koshi Province Location within Nepal
- Coordinates: 26°38′N 87°59′E
- Country: Nepal
- Zone: Mechi Zone
- District: Jhapa
- Wards: 9
- Incorporated: November 16, 1960

Government
  - Type: Mayor–council
  - Body: Kankai Municipality
  - Mayor: Rajendra Kumar Pokharel (NCP)
  - Deputy Mayor: Asha Sharma Shiwakoti(NC)
- Elevation: 300 m (980 ft)
- Time zone: UTC+05:45 (NST)
- Area code: 023
- Website: official website

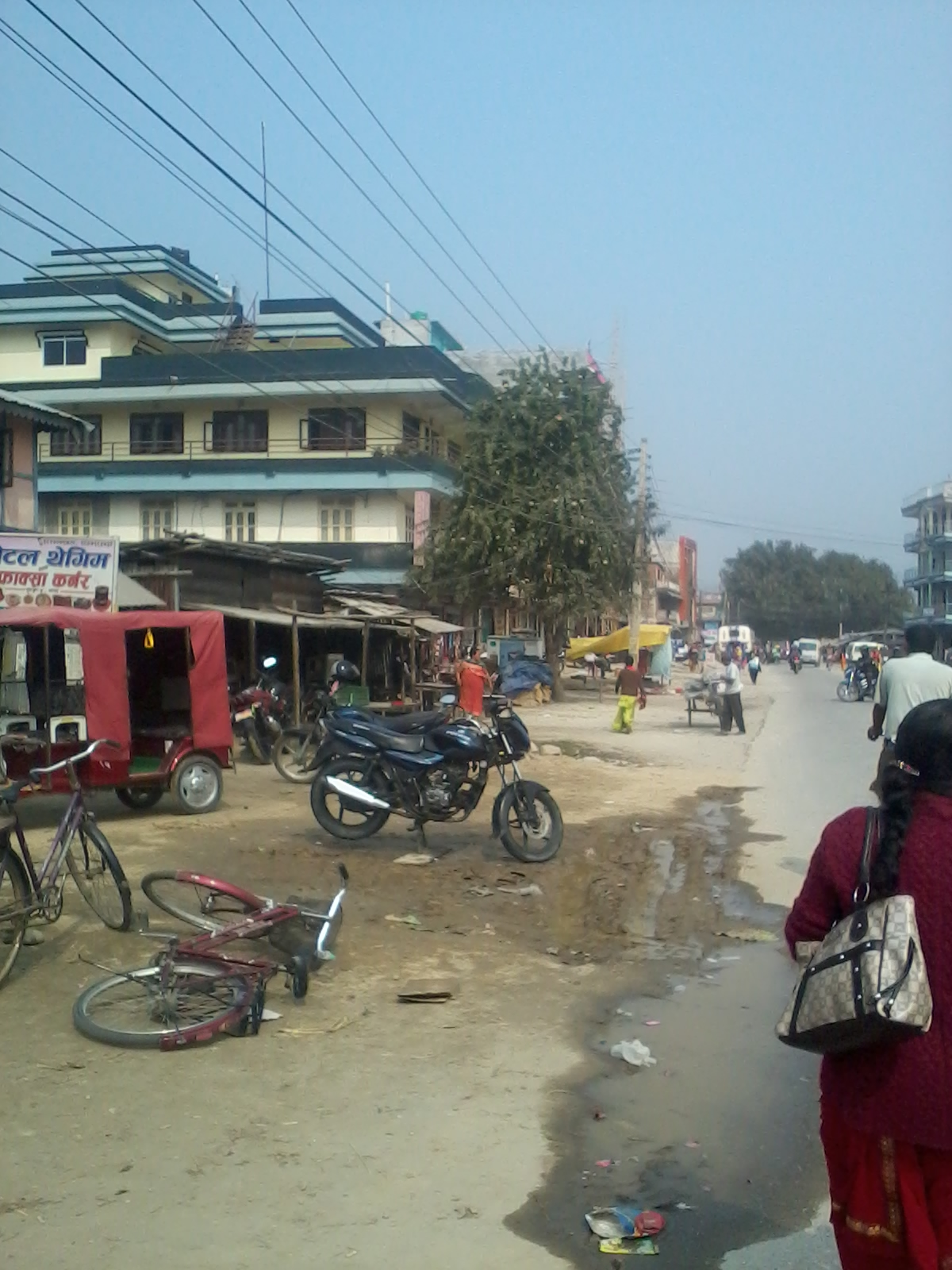

Kankai Municipality is a municipality in Jhapa District of eastern Nepal.

This municipality is formed merging two village development committees i.e. Ghailadubba and Surunga in May 2014. It is one of the biggest municipalities in Jhapa.

== Trade centers ==
- Ghailadubba
- Surunga
- Durgapur
- Laxmipur
- Champapur

== Tourist destinations ==
- Kankai Dham (Kotihom)
- Jamunkhadi Simsar
- Domukha Jhapa
- Dhanuskoti Dham
- Selfi Dada
- Jhandi dada
- Naya basti plotting
