= NMC Jhapa =

Nepal Multipurpose Cooperative Society Limited
- Company type: Cooperative Institution
- Industry: Banking, Dairy Industry, AGRO FARM, COOP SHOP, TEA INDUSTRY
- Founded: 8 March 1994
- Headquarters: Mechinagar-6, Kakarbhitta, Jhapa, Nepal
- Area served: JHAPA, ILAM, MORANG
- Key people: Ramchandra Upreti,President; Laxmiprasad Upreti,Chief executive officer
- Products: Saving, Credit, Remittance, Dairy Products, TEA, AGRICULTURE
- Revenue: रु 22,01,24,644.65
- Net income: रु 5,94,35,961.50
- Members: 150,000 (Women 49%)
- Number of employees: 1150
- Website: http://www.nmc.coop.np

The Nepal Multipurpose Cooperative Society Ltd. Nepali: नेपाल बहुउद्देश्यीय सहकारी संस्था लिमिटेड was established in 1994 March 8 by 26 Founder Members. It was established first with Shree Bachat Tatha Rin Sahakari Sanstha Li. and received authorization from Nepal Rastra Bank to run Limited Banking transactions. Later, Nepal Multipurpose Cooperative Society Ltd. was added as a name change.
