= Sankhamul Bridge =

Bridge in Nepal

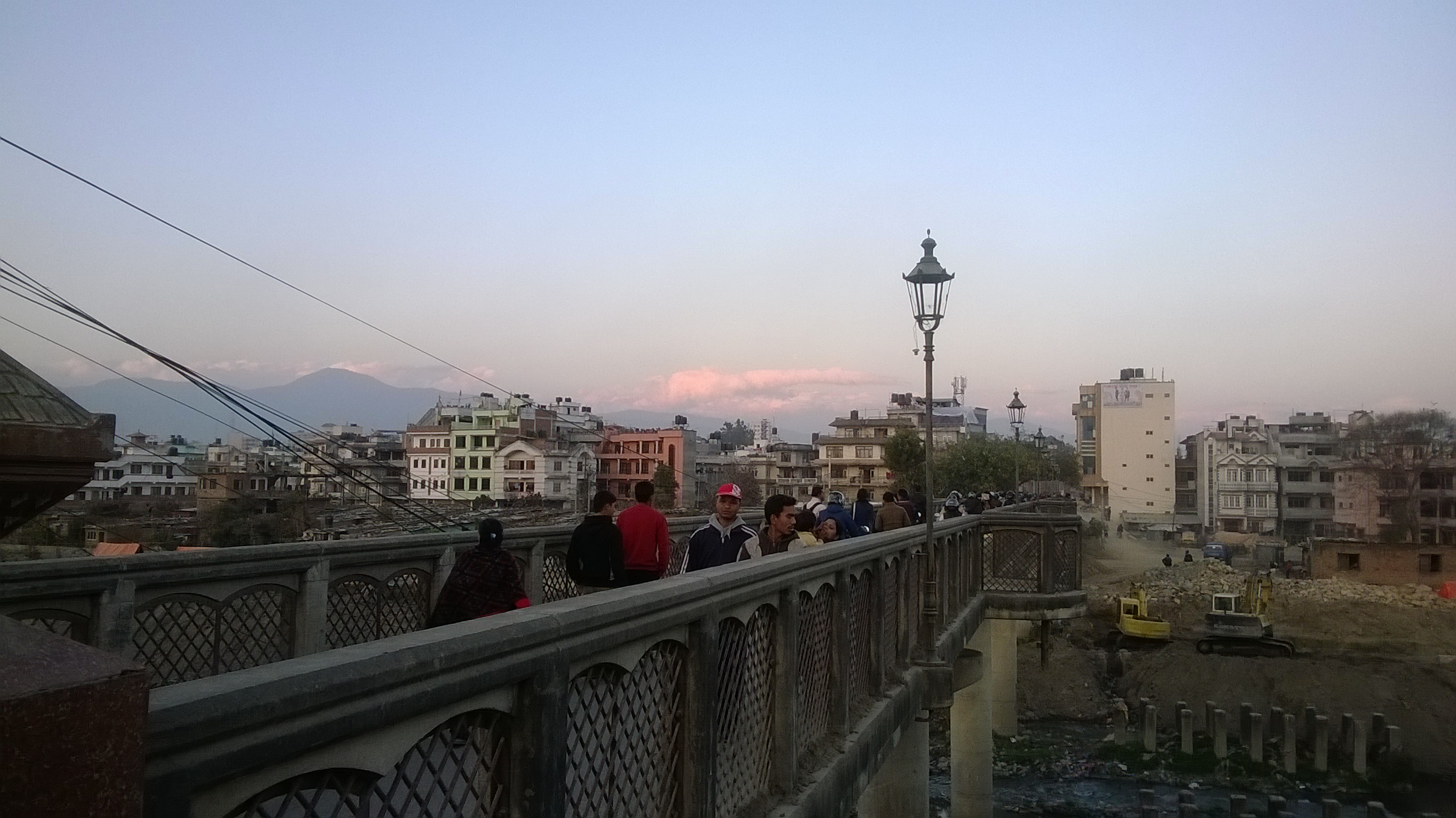
Sankhamaul bridge seen from Lalitpur.

Sankhamul Bridge is a pedestrian bridge over the Bagmati River in Nepal. It lies in Sankhamul. It is the connection between Kathmandu District and Lalitpur District of Nepal. The width of the bridge deters four wheeler vehicles to pass through it. It is the major route for the pedestrians to travel to the renowned temples in the Lalitpur District.
