= Gandaki Golden Footbridge =

World's third-longest footbridge

Gandaki Golden Bridge
- Coordinates: 28°15′41″N 83°36′34″E
- Owner: Nepal Government

Characteristics
- Total length: 567 m (1,860 ft)
- Height: 122 m
- Traversable?: yes
- Longest span: 567m

Location
- Interactive map of Gandaki Golden Bridge

Gandaki Golden Bridge is a suspended footbridge with a span of 567m. It connects the Kusma Municipality of Parbat district at Aduwabari with Baglung Municipality 1 bangechour of Baglung District in Nepal. The bridge is over the Kaligandaki river. The height of bridge is 122 m from the river level.

It is now third longest bridge of its kind, after the opening in May 2022 of Sky Bridge 721 in Czech Republic, and after the opening in July 2021 586 m long «Ponte tibetano di Castelsaraceno» in Italy. Prior to that it was the world's longest foot bridge.

The feasibility study of the bridge was done in 2059 BS and construction was started in Chaitra,2075 BS with a schedule to complete in Asar 2077 BS. The construction was completed three months ahead of schedule in July 2020. The handover of the bridge was delayed due to COVID-19 pandemic.

The bridge has a capacity of 85 MT and can carry the load of 612 people at the same time.

The initial cost estimate of the bridge was NPR 122,200,000, however the Nepal Government subsidised the construction with the final cost amounting to NPR 69,100,000.

== See also ==
- List of notable pedestrian bridges
- Charles Kuonen Suspension Bridge, the former longest footbridge
- Dodhara Chandani Bridge, the longest multi-span suspension footbridge in Nepal
