= Ghailadubba =

Ghailadubba घैलाडुब्बा
- Village
- Location in Nepal
- Coordinates: 26.62°N 87.93°E
- Country: Nepal
- Province: Province No. 1
- District: Jhapa District

Population (1991)
  - Total: 11,185
- Time zone: UTC+5:45 (Nepal Time)

Ghailadubba is a small town and ancient market place in Kankai Municipality near the Biring River in Jhapa District in Province No. 1 of southeastern Nepal. At the 1991 Nepal census, it had a population of 11,185.

The village was merged into Kankai Municipality in May 2014.

== Main trade ==
- Jute
- Animal husbandry
- Food grains
