= Narayansthan =

Coordinates: 28°13′N 83°40′E

Narayansthan नारायणस्थान
- Village development committee
- Location in Nepal Narayansthan (Nepal)
- Country: Nepal
- Zone: Dhaulagiri Zone
- District: Baglung District

Population (2011)
  - Total: 2,876
  - Religions: Hindu
- Time zone: UTC+5:45 (Nepal Time)

Narayansthan is a village development committee in Baglung District in the Dhaulagiri Zone of central Nepal.It is located above the bank of Kali gandaki River. Now, it has become one of the major important place in baglung. They have planned to construct the domestic Airport. At the time of the 2011 Nepal census it had a population of 2,876 and had 781 houses in the town. The major castes living in the VDC are Brahman, Chhetry and Newar. There are 2 high schools - Janatadhan Higher School and Ganesh Secondary School and one campus. Krishna Gandaki Campus is at the premises of Janatadhan HSS. Ganesh Secondary School, one of the best schools in the region is known for its quality education movement. Established in 1957 [2014 BS] by Soldier Board (India), Ganesh Secondary School is one of the oldest schools. In 1964 [2021 BS], the Indian Soldier Board stopped its grant. Since there was no school support mechanism developed from the Government of Nepal, the school passed through many ups and downs. After Modern Education Act came in effect in 1971 BS [2028 BS], the school merged with Janatadhan Higher Secondary School. In 1980 [2037 BS], the school was reopened.

Hatiya, the oldest bazaar of the VDC lies in ward no 5 & 6. Thulakhor is emerging as new bazar along with Garlung. The VDC is only 9 km away from district headquarter, Baglung. Two gravel roads (Baglung - Kusmisera & Kaligandaki Corridor) pass through the VDC. A cable car joins Narayansthan to Kusma, the district headquarters of Parvat. A suspension bridge from Badgaun, Kusma to Kaiya (Narayansthan-9) is another way to travel to Narayansthan. Kaiya has fertile land.
