= Karnali Bridge =

Bridge in Nepal

Karnali Bridge (कर्णाली पुल)
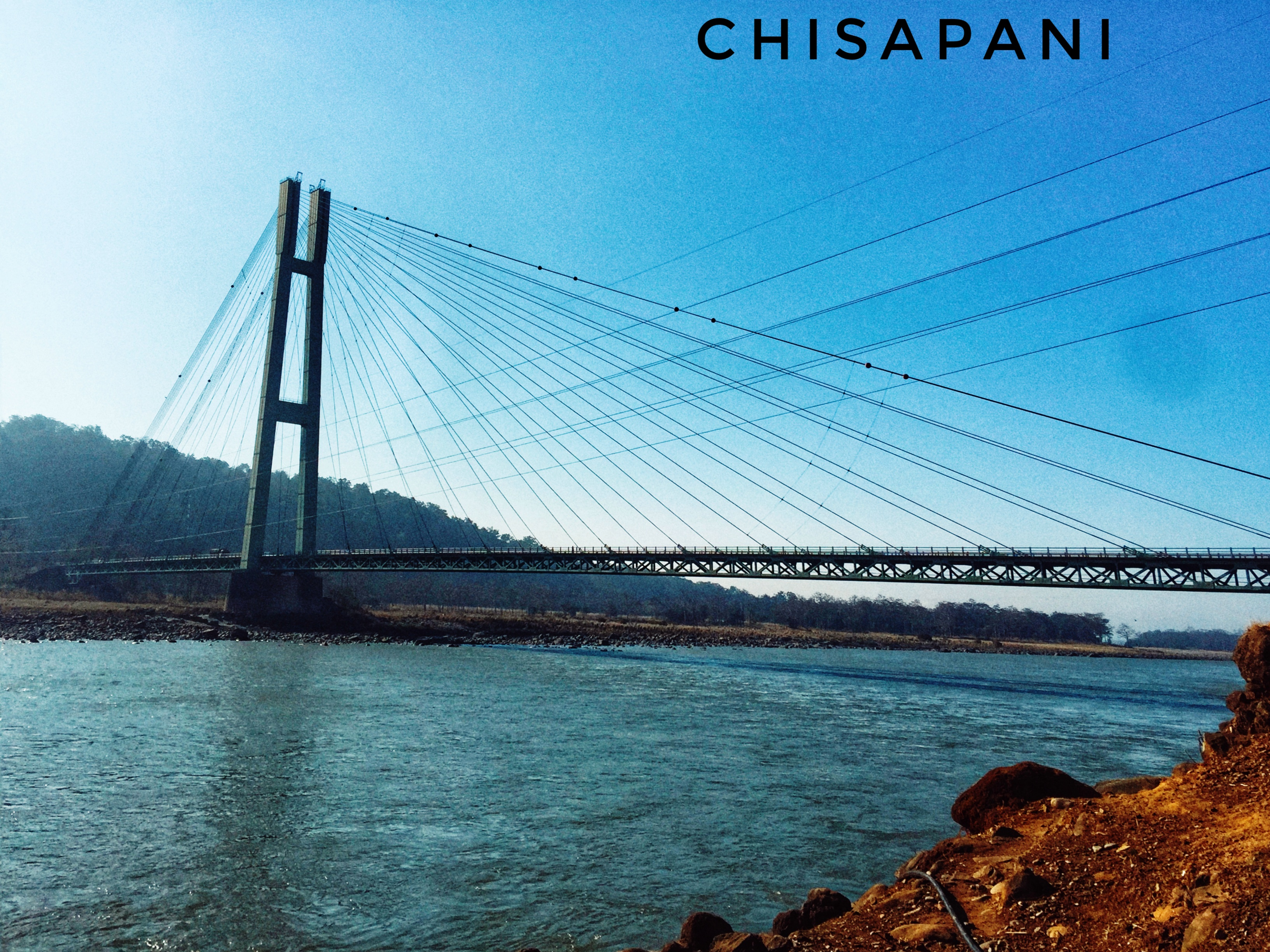
- Bridge on Karnali river at chisapani
- Coordinates: 28°38′N 81°17′E
- Crosses: Karnali River
- Locale: Chisapani, Kailali Nepal
- Maintained by: Lamki Chuha Municipality, Kailali

Characteristics
- Design: asymmetric, single-tower, cable-stayed bridge
- Total length: 500 m (1,640.4 ft)
- Width: 11.30 m (37.1 ft)
- Height: 120 m (393.7 ft)
- Longest span: 325 m (1,066.3 ft)
- No. of spans: 2

History
- Designer: Steinman, Boynton, Gronquist & Birdsall
- Constructed by: Kawasaki Heavy Industries, Japan
- Opened: 1994; 31 years ago

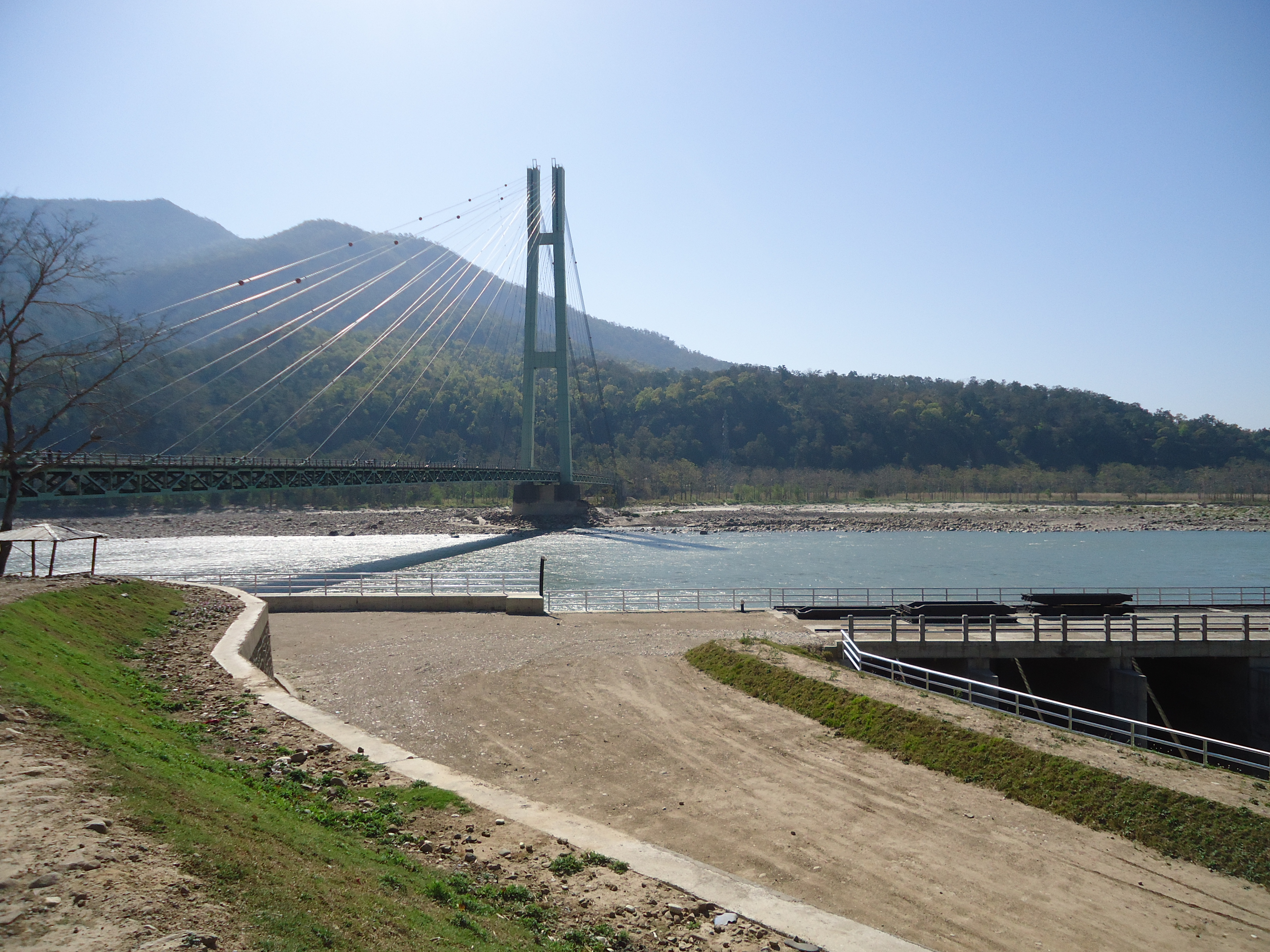
side view

Karnali Bridge, the asymmetric, single-tower, cable-stayed bridge is the second longest of its type in Nepal and was built by international collaboration between USA, Japan and Nepal.

== Overview ==
It is the first and only cable-stayed bridge in the country till date. The bridge spans the Karnali River between the Kailali District and Bardiya District of western Nepal. The bridge was designed by Steinman, Boynton, Gronquist & Birdsall of USA, constructed by Kawasaki Heavy Industries of Japan and funded by the World Bank. It was inaugurated after six years of its construction date by the late Prime Minister Girija Prasad Koirala.

== Location ==
The bridge lies in Mahendra Highway at Chisapani at the border of Kailali and Bardiya district. The bridge site is 500 km from the capital city of Kathmandu, and 86 km from the closest airport facilities in Dhangadhi. The design of the bridge and its location have made it a tourist attraction for domestic and international visitors. The nearest city to the Karnali Bridge is the town of Chisapani in Far-Western Region, Nepal.

== See also ==
- Narayani Bridge
- Sino-Nepal Friendship Bridge
