= Chandani =

Village development committee in Sudurpashchim Province, Nepal

Chandani चाँदनी
- Village development committee
- Location in Nepal
- Coordinates: 28.93°N 80.09°E
- Country: Nepal
- Province: Sudurpashchim Province
- District: Kanchanpur District

Population (2011)
  - Total: 19,550
- Time zone: UTC+5:45 (Nepal Time)

Chandani is a village development committee in Kanchanpur District in Sudurpashchim Province of south-western Nepal. At the time of the 1991 Nepal census it had a population of 12,385 people living in 2240 individual households. Mainly Brahmins, ksheris mostly western community. The main language is Doteli.
