= Dodhara =

Village development committee in Sudurpashchim Province, Nepal

Dodhara दोधारा
- Village development committee
- Nickname: Weedy Kag
- Location in Nepal
- Coordinates: 28.86°N 80.08°E
- Country: Nepal
- Province: Sudurpashchim Province
- District: Kanchanpur District

Population (1991)
  - Total: 13,429
- Time zone: UTC+5:45 (Nepal Time)
- Website: http://www.hamrododhara.blogspot.com

Dodhara is a village development committee in Kanchanpur District in the Sudurpashchim Province of south-western Nepal. At the time of the 1991 Nepal census it had a population of 12,385 people living in 2240 individual households. Mainly Brahmins, ksheris mostly western community. The main Language is Doteli.

== Media/communication ==
NTC, Sky (CDMA), NT 3G (Nepal telecom), Ncell are giving services currently. ( Hello Nepal is under construction).
