= Balubadi =

Balubadi वालुवाडी
- Village development committee
- Location in Nepal
- Coordinates: 26.44°N 88.02°E
- Country: Nepal
- Province: Province No. 1
- District: Jhapa District
- Elevation: 58 m (190 ft)

Population (2011)
  - Total: 5,535
- Time zone: UTC+5:45 (Nepal Time)

Balubadi (वालुवाडी) is a former village development committee (VDC) in Jhapa District in Province No. 1 of south-eastern Nepal. It lies in the fertile Terai plains and borders Bhadrapur Municipality. At the time of the 1991 Nepal census it had a population of 4,926 people living in 985 individual households. By the 2011 Nepal census, the population had grown to 5,535 people in 1,246 households.

== Administrative history ==
Balubadi functioned as a VDC until 10 March 2017, when all VDCs across Nepal were dissolved as part of the federal restructuring process under Nepal's new constitution. On that date, Balubadi was merged with the former VDCs of Gherabari, Pathariya, Kechana, Pathamari, and Baniyani to form the new Kachankawal Rural Municipality. The headquarters of the new rural municipality is located at Baniyani. Kachankawal Rural Municipality covers an area of approximately 110 square kilometres and had a combined population of 39,593 according to the 2011 census.

== Geography ==
Balubadi is located in the southern plains of Jhapa District, at an elevation of approximately 58 metres above sea level — among the lowest elevations in Nepal. It experiences a humid-subtropical climate with hot summers, monsoon rains, and mild winters. The village lies in a fertile agricultural area of the Terai and borders Bhadrapur Municipality to the north. The area is part of the territory of Kachankawal Rural Municipality, which borders India to the south and east, Barhadashi Rural Municipality and India to the west, and Haldibari Rural Municipality and Bhadrapur Municipality to the north.

== Demographics ==
According to the 1991 census, Balubadi had a population of 4,926 people in 985 households. By the 2011 Nepal census, this had grown to 5,535 people — 2,632 males and 2,903 females — in 1,246 households. The village is home to a mix of ethnic communities typical of Jhapa District, including Brahmin, Chhetri, Majhi, Rajbanshi, Gangai, and other Madhesi groups.

== Economy ==
The economy of Balubadi is primarily based on agriculture, consistent with the broader Kachankawal area. Major crops include rice, maize, wheat, jute, and vegetables. The area is also known for cash crops such as arecanut (betel nut), ginger, and fruit cultivation, particularly mango and litchi, for which the region is a significant producer. Livestock farming — cattle, buffaloes, and goats — as well as fisheries in local ponds also contribute to livelihoods. Some residents engage in small-scale cross-border trade with nearby towns and markets in India.

== Education ==
Balubadi has primary and secondary schools serving local children. The broader Kachankawal Rural Municipality, of which Balubadi is now part, has more than 51 schools, including both public and private institutions. Students often travel to nearby towns, such as Bhadrapur or Birtamode, for higher education and +2 level programmes.

== Culture and Society ==
Residents celebrate festivals such as Dashain, Tihar, Holi, and Chhath. The predominant religion in the area is Hinduism. Traditional music, dances, and local cuisines form part of the village's cultural identity.

== Transportation ==
Balubadi is accessible via the Mechi Highway, which connects the area to larger towns including Birtamode (approximately 35 km away) and Bhadrapur (approximately 20 km away). Public buses, microbuses, and private vehicles provide transport for residents.

== Local Landmarks and Facilities ==
Balubadi and the surrounding Kachankawal area have several notable features and community facilities, including:

- The Kechana Kawal landmark — the lowest measured point in Nepal at 58 metres above sea level — located within the broader Kachankawal Rural Municipality area, drawing visitors from across the country.
- Kechana Lake (Kechana Jhil) and the Kechana wetlands, which are popular natural sites in the vicinity.
- Community health posts and clinics for basic healthcare needs; the broader rural municipality has one health centre, five health posts, two community health centres, and three birthing centres.
- Local temples and shrines serving as cultural and religious centres.
- Village marketplaces where residents sell agricultural produce and daily necessities.
- Recreational areas and open spaces used for festivals and community events.
