= Kachankawal Rural Municipality =

Rural Municipality in Province Koshi, Nepal

Kachankawal कचनकवल
- Rural Municipality
- Kachankawal Rural Municipality
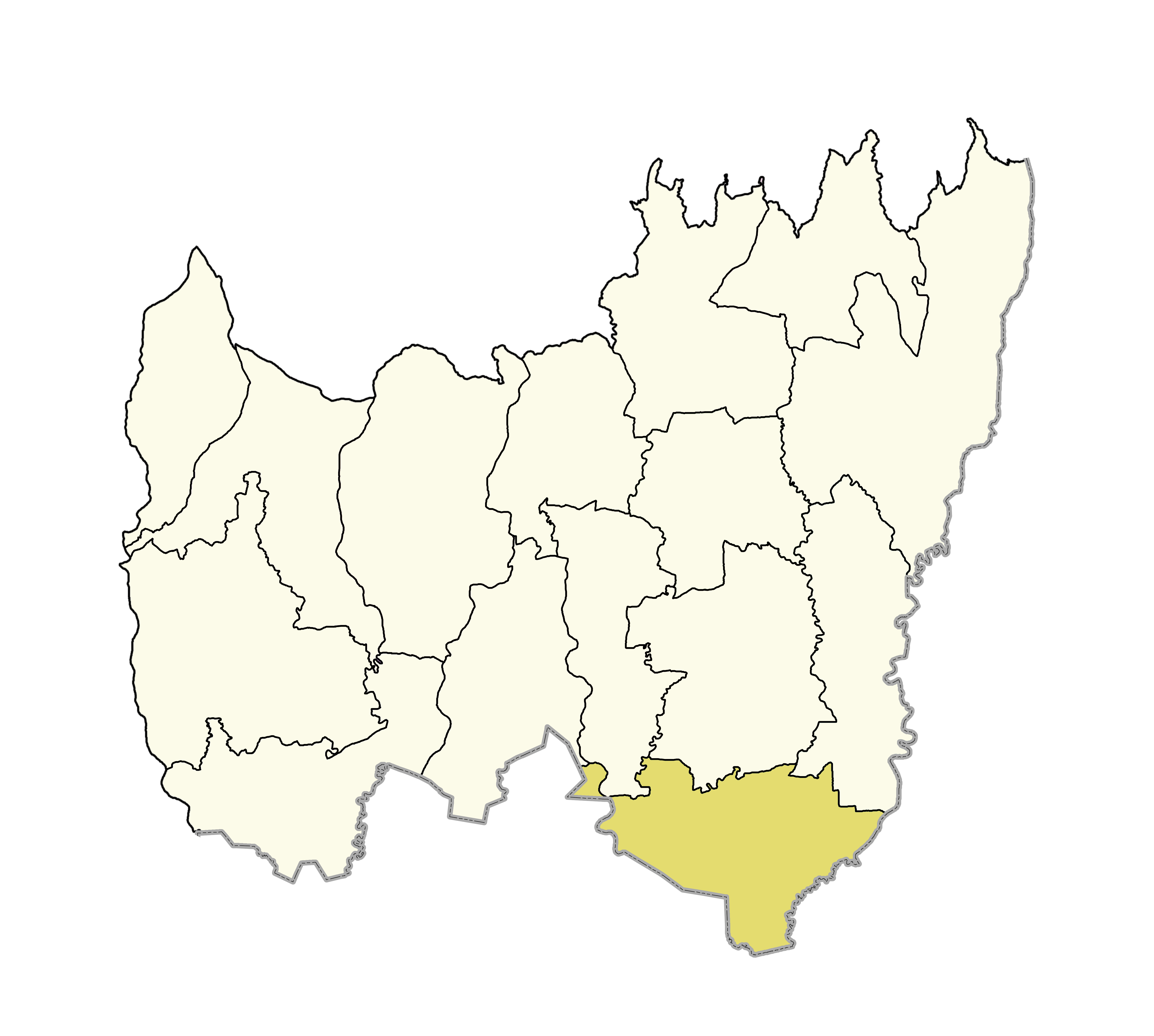
- Location of Kachankawal in Jhapa District

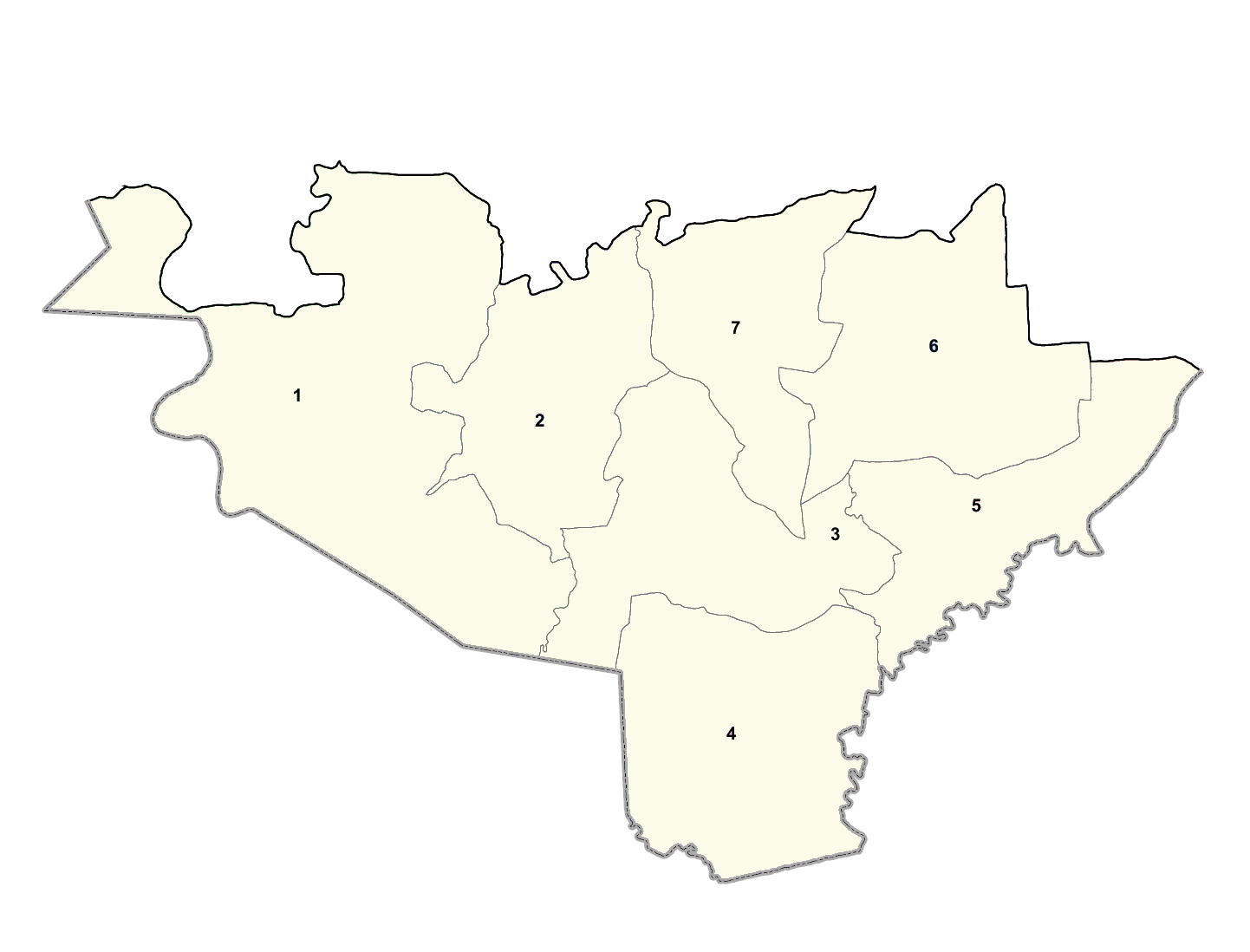
- Ward divisions of Kachankawal

- Location in Koshi Province Kachankawal (Nepal)
- Coordinates: 26.431521°N 88.033213°E
- Country: Nepal
- Province: Koshi Province
- District: Jhapa
- Total Wards: 7
- Established: March 2017
- Seat: [Baniyani]

Government
  - Type: Rural Council
  - Body: Kachankawal Rural Council
  - Chairperson: Mr.Kalendra Prasad Singh Rajbanshi(NC)
  - Vice-chairperson: Mr.Nawaraj Bhattarai(NCP, UML)

Area of Municipality
  - Total: 110 km^{2} (42 sq mi)

Population (2011)
  - Total: 39,593
  - Density: 360/km^{2} (930/sq mi)

Languages
  - Official: Nepali Local language Rajbanshi,[Surjapuri language]
- Time zone: UTC+5:45 (NST)
- Postal code: 57200
- Website: Official website

Kachankawal (Nepali: कचनकवल) is one of the seven rural municipalities of Jhapa District of Koshi Province, Nepal. Out of the total 15 local administrative units in Jhapa District, eight municipalities are urban and seven rural.

Kachankawal rural municipality has an area of 110 square kilometres (42 mi^{2}) and total population according to the 2011 Nepal census is 39,593. The rural municipality was established merging former VDCs: Gherabari, Pathariya, Kechana, Pathamari, Baniyani and Balubadi.

Mr.Kalendra prasad singh Rajbanshi of Nepali Congress has elected as a chairperson of the rural municipality and Mr. Nawaraj Bhattarai of the Nepal Communist Party Yemale party elected for the vice-chairperson after the results of the local level elections held in Nepal on 27 June 2022.

KachanKawal the lowest point of Nepal, which elevation is 58 m above sea level is located in this rural municipality.

== Constituencies ==
- Parliamentary constituency: Kachankawal RM is a part of Jhapa 3 parliamentary constituency and Rajendra Prasad Lingden is the MP of Jhapa 3 who was elected in 2017 Nepalese general election, who is the candidate of Rastriya Prajatantra Party.
- Provincial constituency: Kachankawal with Bhadrapur Municipality comprises "Jhapa 3 (A)" Provincial constituency and Bhumi Prasad Rajbanshi (Nepali Congress Party) is the MLA.

== Neighborhoods ==
- Gherabari
- Pathariya
- Kechana
- Pathamari
- Baniyani
- Balubadi

== Demographics ==
At the time of the 2011 Nepal census, Kachankawal Rural municipality had a population of 39,593. Of these, 44.3% spoke Rajbanshi, 24.9% Nepali, 13.9% Urdu, 5.2% Maithili, 3.4% Santali, 2.1% Limbu, 1.4% Tamang, 0.9% Rai, 0.6% Sunwar, 0.5% Gurung, 0.5% Newar, 0.3% Bhojpuri, 0.3% Khash, 0.3% Magar, 0.2% Bengali, 0.2% Hindi, 0.2% Kisan, 0.1% Ganagai, 0.1% Mech and 0.2% other languages as their first language.

In terms of ethnicity/caste, 35.5% were Rajbanshi, 14.6% Musalman, 12.9% Hill Brahmin, 8.5% Chhetri, 8.3% Gangai, 3.5% Santal, 2.3% Limbu, 1.5% Tamang, 1.4% Yadav, 1.2% Majhi, 1.1% Rai, 0.8% Newar, 0.7% Gurung, 0.7% Hajjam/Thakur, 0.6% Sunuwar, 0.5% Kami, 0.5% Magar, 0.5% Sanyasi/Dasnami, 0.4% Damai/Dholi, 0.4% Gaine, 0.4% Mallaha, 0.3% Gharti/Bhujel, 0.3% other Terai, 0.2% Dhanuk, 0.2% Halwai, 0.2% Kathabaniyan, 0.2% Sonar, 0.2% Teli, 0.1% Bantar/Sardar, 0.1% Baraee, 0.1% Terai Brahmin, 0.1% Chamar/Harijan/Ram, 0.1% Kahar, 0.1% Kalwar, 0.1% Koiri/Kushwaha, 0.1% Kumal, 0.1% Lohar, 0.1% Mali, 0.1% Mech, 0.1% Musahar, 0.1% Punjabi/Sikh, 0.1% Sarki, 0.1% Tharu and 0.5% others.

In terms of religion, 79.2% were Hindu, 14.5% Muslim, 2.4% Buddhist, 2.4% Kirati, 0.7% Christian, 0.5% Prakriti and 0.2% others.

In terms of literacy, 65.7% could read and write, 1.2% could only read and 33.1% could neither read nor write.
