= Lalpur Thana =

- Village
- Location in Chhattisgarh, India Lalpur Thana (India)
- Coordinates: 22.184229°N 81.701574°E
- Country: India
- State: Chhattisgarh
- District: Mungeli

Government
  - Type: Panchayat raj
  - Body: Gram panchayat

Languages
  - Official: Hindi, Chhattisgarhi
- Time zone: UTC+5:30 (IST)
- PIN: 495334
- Vehicle registration: CG 28

Lalpur Thana is a village and a tehsil in Mungeli district in the Indian state of Chhattisgarh. It is located 18 kilometres (11 mi) from Lormi, 15 kilometres (9.3 mi) from the district headquarters in Mungeli, 75 kilometres (47 mi) away from Bilaspur, and 121 kilometres (75 mi) from state capital Raipur. The village is administered by a Sarpanch, who is an elected representative of the village.

== Geography ==
Lalpur Thana is located at 22.184229°N 81.701574°E

== See also ==
- Jhajhpuri Kalan
- Setganga
