= Pathariya =

Pathariya may refer to:

- Pathariya, Nepal, a village in Nepal
- Patharia, a town in Damoh district, Madhya Pradesh, India
- Pathariya, Bhopal, a village in Bhopal district, Madhya Pradesh, India
- Pathariya, Chhattisgarh, a town and tehsil in Chhattisgarh
- Pathariya (Vidhan Sabha constituency), a legislative constituency in Madhya Pradesh, India
