= Jhajhpuri Kalan =

- Village
- Location in Chhattisgarh, India Jhajhpuri Kalan (India)
- Coordinates: 22.2880165°N 81.6686726°E
- Country: India
- State: Chhattisgarh
- Region: Bilaspur division
- District: Mungeli
- Tehsil: Lormi

Government
  - Type: Panchayat raj
  - Body: Gram panchayat

Area
  - Total: 489.79 ha (1,210.3 acres)

Population (2011)
  - Total: 3,313
  - Density: 676.4/km^{2} (1,752/sq mi)
- Sex ratio 1662/1651 ♂/♀

Languages
  - Official: Chhattisgarhi
- Time zone: UTC+5:30 (IST)
- PIN: 495115
- ISO 3166 code: IN-CG
- Post office: Jhajhpuri Kalan

Jhajhpuri Kalan is a village in the Mungeli district of the State of Chhattisgarh, India. It is located 3 kilometres (1.9 mi) away from the sub-district headquarters at Lormi, 29 kilometres (18 mi) from the district headquarters at Mungeli, 68 kilometres (42 mi) from Bilaspur, and 130 kilometres (81 mi) from the state capital, Raipur. The village is administered by a Sarpanch, an elected representative of the village.

== Demography ==
As of 2011, Jhajhpuri Kalan had 780 households and a population of 3,313, comprising 1,662 males and 1,651 females, according to the Census of India report published in 2011. The literacy rate of Jhajhpuri Kalan is 53.15%, with 65.82% of males and 40.40% of females being literate. The village has 640 children aged 0-6 years, making up 19.32% of the total population. The average sex ratio in Jhajhpuri Kalan is 993, which is higher than the Chhattisgarh state average of 991. The child sex ratio is 1,032, exceeding the Chhattisgarh average of 969.

== See also ==
- Lormi
- Ratanpur
- List of villages in India
