= Maniyari River =

River in Chhattisgarh, India

Coordinates: 21°53′02″N 82°02′10″E

- Location within India

Location
- Country: India
- States: Chhattisgarh
- Regions: Chhattisgarh
- Administrative areas: Mungeli, Bilaspur,(Chhattisgarh)
- Cities: Lormi, Mungeli, Takhatpur

Physical characteristics
- Length: 80 km (50 mi)

The Maniyari River is a tributary of the Shivnath River, located in the state of Chhattisgarh, India. It serves as a significant water source for agricultural and domestic purposes in the region. The river flows through the districts of Mungeli and Bilaspur before merging with the Shivnath.

== Course ==
The Maniyari River originates from the hills near the Achanakmar Tiger Reserve in Chhattisgarh. It flows through the plains of Mungeli and Bilaspur, covering a distance of approximately 120 kilometres (75 mi). The river finally merges with the Shivnath River about 50 kilometres (31 mi) from its confluence with the Mahanadi River, one of the major rivers of Eastern India.

== Tributaries ==
The Maniyari River has several small tributaries that contribute to its flow. Some of its prominent tributaries include:

- Arpa River
- Lilagar River

These tributaries play an essential role in maintaining the river's water volume, particularly during the monsoon season.

== Significance ==
=== Agriculture ===
The river supports extensive agricultural activities in the Mungeli and Bilaspur districts. The Khudia Dam, also known as the Rajiv Gandhi Reservoir, constructed on the Maniyari River, provides irrigation water to nearby farmlands.

=== Drinking-water supply ===
A large-scale water supply project has been initiated to provide drinking water from the Maniyari River to multiple towns and villages in the region.

=== Religious and cultural importance ===
The river holds cultural significance, with several festivals and rituals celebrated on its banks, especially during religious occasions like Chhath Puja.

== Environmental concerns ==
Like many rivers in India, the Maniyari River faces environmental challenges such as pollution from agricultural runoff and domestic waste. Efforts are being made to regulate wastewater discharge and maintain the ecological balance of the river.
