= Sargaon =

Town in Chhattisgarh

- Town
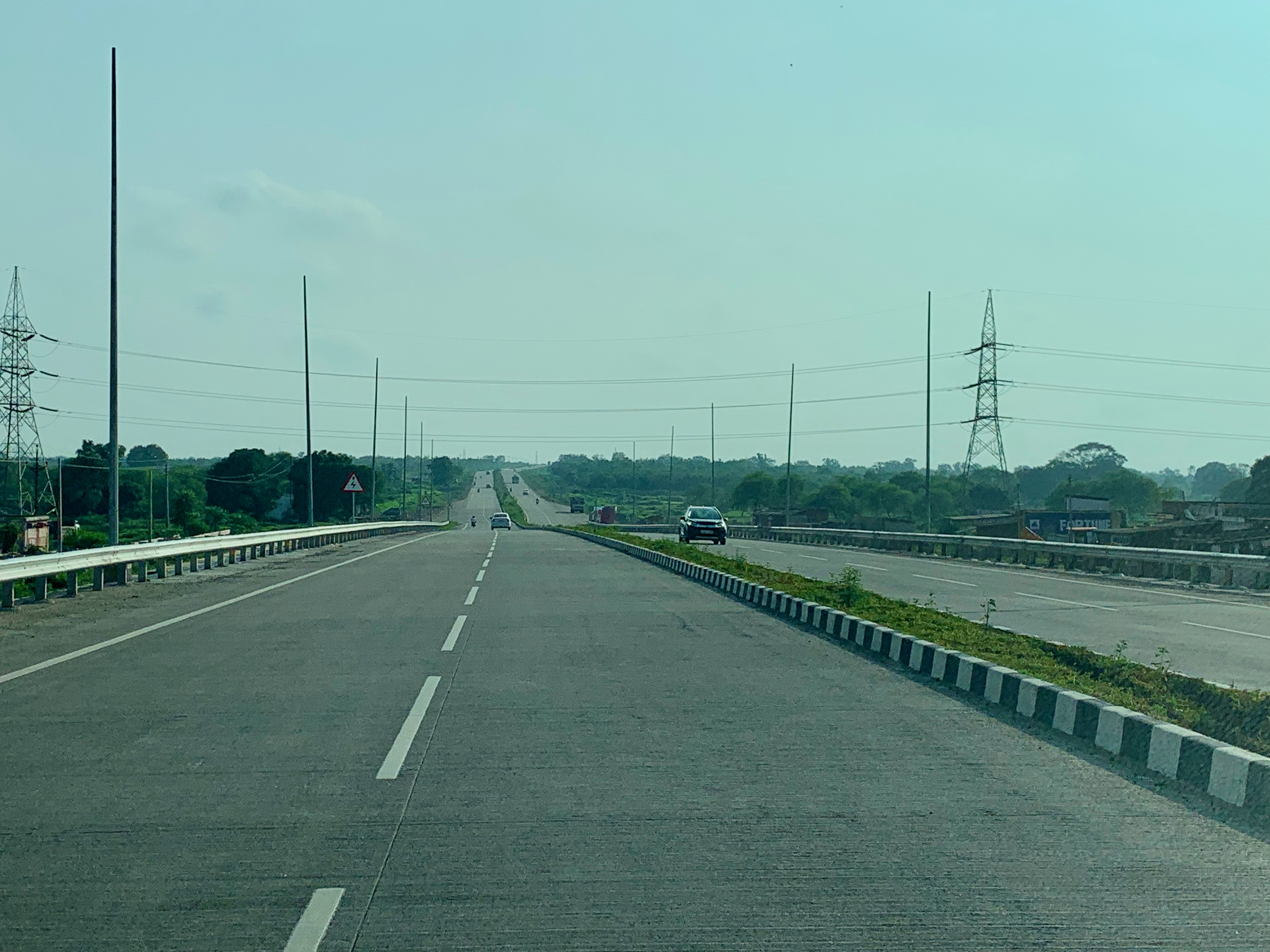
- Raipur - Bilaspur Highway

- Location in Chhattisgarh
- Coordinates: 21°53′58″N 81°58′45″E
- Country: India
- State: Chhattisgarh
- District: Mungeli
- Elevation: 315 m (1,033 ft)

Population (2011)
  - Total: 7,484

Languages
  - Official: Hindi, Chhattisgarhi
- PIN code: 495224

Sargaon is a town and Nagar Panchayat in the Mungeli district of the Indian state of Chhattisgarh. It is also a Tehsil headquarters and a tribal region.

== Geography ==
Sargaon has an average elevation of 315 m (1,033 ft). The Shivnath River and the Maniyari River flow near Sargaon. The PIN code of Sargaon is 495224.

== Demographics ==
According to the 2011 census of India, Sargaon has a population of 7,484 of which 3,736 are males and 3,748 are females. Population of children aged 0-6 is 1197 – 15.99 % of the total population of Sargaon. The female sex ratio is 1003, against the state average of 991.

== Transportation ==
The Raipur to Bilaspur highway passes through Sargaon and a major road connects it to Mungeli. Daily bus service available in the town.

== See also ==
- Pathariya
- Mungeli District
