= Kechana Kawal =

Kachan Kawal कचन कवल
- Previously the lowest point of Nepal; The lowest point of Koshi Province
- Location in Koshi Province Kachan Kawal (Nepal)
- Coordinates: 26.372926°N 88.022659°E
- Country: Nepal
- Province: Province No. 1
- District: Jhapa District
- Municipality: Kachankawal Rural Municipality
- Elevation: 70 m (230 ft)
- Time zone: UTC+5:45 (Nepal Time)

Kachan Kawal (Nepali: कचन कवल) is a place located in Kachan kawal Rural Municipality (previously, Kechana VDC) of Koshi Province of Nepal. At an elevation of 70 metres (230 ft) above sea level, it was declared the lowest point of Nepal previously But according to new survey by the Government of Nepal in 2017 and some other institutions, Mukhiyapatti Musharniya of Dhanusha District at 59 metres has been declared the new lowest point of Nepal. On the other hand, Mount Everest, the highest point in Nepal and on Earth, is located in Khumjung of Solukhumbu District in the same province No. 1.
