= Khudia Dam =

Dam in Chhattisgarh, India

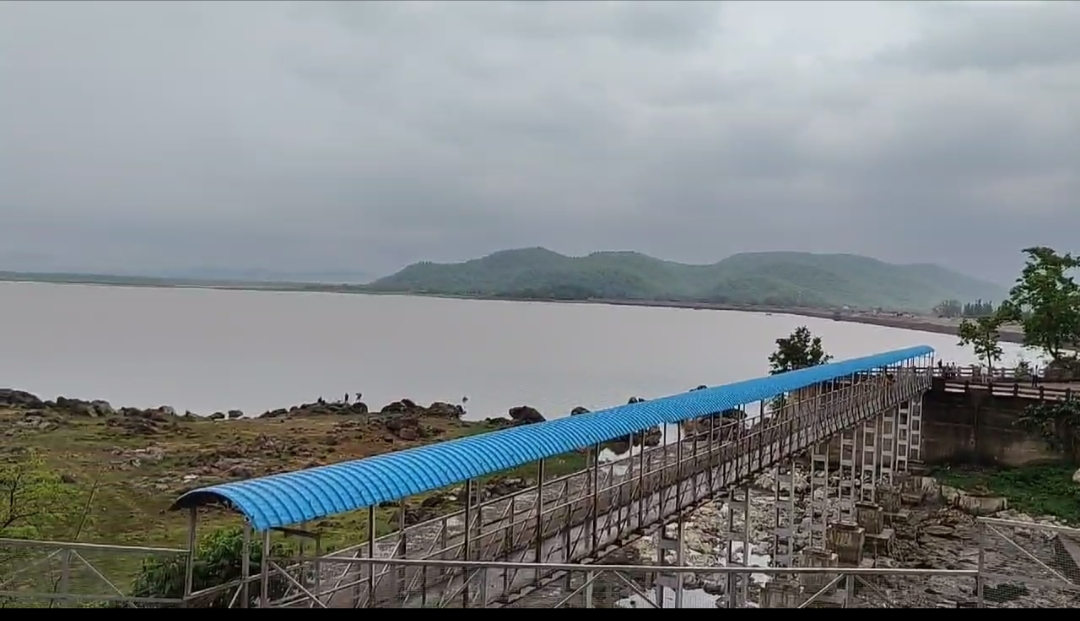
- A view of Khudia Dam

- Location within Chhattisgarh Location within India
- Official name: Rajiv Gandhi Reservoir
- Location: 45 km from Mungeli, Chhattisgarh
- Coordinates: 22°23′24″N 81°35′47″E
- Construction began: 1927; 99 years ago
- Opening date: 1930; 96 years ago
- Construction cost: 9.94 million Rs in 1930
- Owner: Government of Chhattisgarh

Dam and spillways
- Type of dam: Composite dam and reservoir
- Impounds: Maniyari River
- Height: 18.3 m (60 ft)
- Length: 1,218 m (3,996 ft)
- Spillway capacity: 850 cubic metres per second (30,000 cu ft/s)

Reservoir
- Total capacity: 61,200,000 m^{3} (49,616 acre⋅ft)
- Catchment area: 472 km^{2} (182 sq mi)

The Khudia Dam, also known as the Khudia Bandh or Khudia Reservoir, is a significant irrigation dam located in the Lormi block of Mungeli district, Chhattisgarh, India. Situated approximately 45 kilometres from the district headquarters of Mungeli, this reservoir plays a crucial role in the region's agriculture and tourism.

== History and construction ==
The dam's construction commenced during the British colonial period in 1927 and was completed in 1930. Engineers utilised the natural topography by connecting three hills through which the Maniyari River flows, creating the reservoir. Initially known as the Khudia Reservoir, it was later renamed Rajiv Gandhi Reservoir in honour of the former prime minister of India.

== Geographical setting ==
Located amid forests and bordered by mountain ranges to the northwest, the reservoir features diverse wildlife and birdlife, attracting nature enthusiasts.

== Tourism and accessibility ==
The reservoir has become a notable tourist destination, offering boating, fishing, and picnicking along its banks. A rest house provides basic accommodation. The site is accessible by road from Raipur, with bus and private vehicle connections. The nearest railway stations are Kota and Bilaspur.

== Agricultural significance ==
Beyond tourism, the reservoir is a crucial irrigation source, sustaining agriculture in surrounding villages and supporting the local economy. It remains essential for both agriculture and tourism in Chhattisgarh.
