= Setganga =

Setganga Shwet Ganga
- City
- Location in Chhattisgarh, India Setganga (India)
- Coordinates: 22.28°N 81.73°E
- Country: India
- State: Chhattisgarh
- District: Mungeli
- Established: 1134
- Founder: Nagvanshi Dynasty
- Named for: Ganges

Government
  - Type: Mayor-Council [Jay Dewangan]
  - Body: Nagar Panchayat, Setganga

Population
  - Total: 5,158

Languages
  - Official: Hindi, Chhattisgarhi
- Time zone: UTC+5:30 (IST)
- PIN: 495334
- Vehicle registration: CG 28

Setganga is a tourist destination of the Mungeli district in the Indian state of Chhattisgarh. Setganga is an ancient and religious town located in Mungeli district of Chhattisgarh state of India. South Skill Chhattisgarh holds a unique place in relation to religion, culture, tourism, art, music and history. There are many pilgrimage sites of historical, religious and cultural importance here. One of which is Setganga. In fact, its ancient name is Shwetaganga, which means white Ganga. Many centuries ago, a pond appeared here, whose water was as cool, clean and pure as the Ganges. Ascetics and sages called it Shwetaganga after the name of Mother Ganga. According to Jan Shruti, King Phaninagavanshi had a dream that I, Vishnupadabja Sambhut, Tripathagamini Ganga, is appearing in the western border of your kingdom and flowing. Establish my pond and temple there. In the 10th-11th century, the king built Shri Ram Janaki Temple and Shwetaganga Kund there. Village Setganga has the distinction of being a religious, cultural and historical village.

== Temples ==
It is mainly known for the Shri Ram Janki temple, The temple here was built in the 9th-10th century. The temple is best known for its gatekeeper, the demon king of Lanka, Ravana. this make dalsaye siha 1751

== Geography ==
The city lies about 15 kilometres (9.3 mi) east from Mungeli, 65 kilometres (40 mi) east from Bilaspur, and 40 kilometres (25 mi) west from Kawardha which are situated on National Highway 130A.
