= Alam Khan (actor) =

Indian actor, model and dancer

- Citizenship: Indian
- Occupations: Actor; model; dancer
- Years active: 2008–present

Alam Khan is an Indian actor, model and dancer. He was a part of Colors TV dance reality show Chak Dhoom Dhoom (2010). He was the first runner-up in Chhote Miyan (2012). He is best known for his roles in Kota Factory, Laakhon Mein Ek, Class of 2020, Chaman Bahaar and the 2013 Star Plus’ epic Television series, Mahabharat.

== Filmography ==
=== Television ===
| Year | Title | Role | Notes |
|---|---|---|---|
| 2008 | Hamari Devrani | Kunal Nanavati | |
| 2012 | Savdhaan India | Bhulla | Episode 707 |
| 2013 | Ekk Nayi Pehchaan | Arav Mahesh Ajmera / Arav Suresh Modi | |
| 2013 | Confessions of an Indian Teenager | Alam | |
| 2013 | Shake It Up | Dheeraj Dambole | |
| 2013 | Mahabharat | Young Duryodhan | |
| 2014–2015 | Yam Kisi Se Kam Nahin | Himesh | |
| 2015 | Best of Luck Nikki | Surendra Chadha | |
| 2016–2017 | Santoshi Maa | | |
| 2017 | Akbar – Rakht Se Takht Ka Safar | Adham Khan | |

=== Films ===
| Year | Title | Role | Notes | Ref. |
|---|---|---|---|---|
| 2013 | Hamara Hero Shaktimaan | | | |
| 2016 | Freaky Ali | Mohalla kid | | |
| 2016 | Love Day - Pyaar Ka Din | | | |
| 2018 | 3 Storeys | | | |
| 2020 | Chaman Bahaar | Shiladitya Tiwari | | |
| 2023 | Haddi | Sunil Ahlawat | | |
| 2025 | Saiyaara | KV | | |

=== Web series ===
| Year | Title | Role | Ref. |
|---|---|---|---|
| 2017 | Laakhon Mein Ek | Chudail | |
| 2019–2024 | Kota Factory | Uday Gupta | |
| 2020 | Class of 2020 | Toto | |
