= Pathariya, Chhattisgarh =

Tehsil and Town in Chhattisgarh, India

Pathariya
- Town
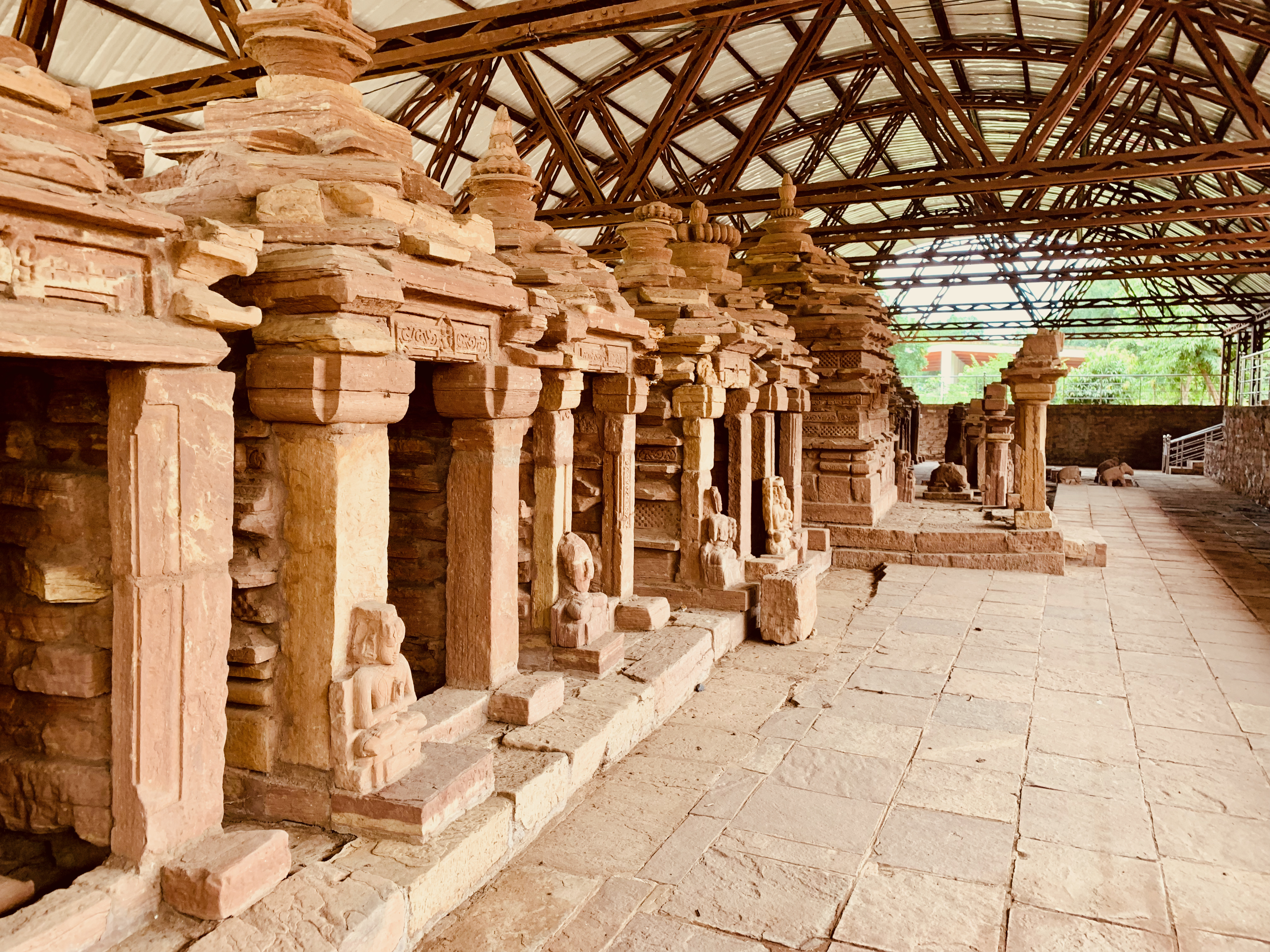
- Madku temple in shivnath island near pathariya

- Location in Chhattisgarh
- Coordinates: 21.84°N 81.90°E
- Country: India
- State: Chhattisgarh
- District: Mungeli
- Elevation: 315 m (1,033 ft)

Population (2011)
  - Total: 6,349

Languages
  - Official: Hindi, Chhattisgarhi
- PIN code: 491340

Pathariya is a major town and a nagar parishad in Mungeli district of Chhattisgarh state in India. It is also serves as the headquarters of Pathariya tehsil.

== Geography ==
Pathariya is located at 21.84°N 81.90°E. It has an average elevation of 315 m (1,033 ft) above sea level. The Shivnath River flows near the town. Pathariya is located on the Raipur to Bilaspur highway. The town's PIN code is 491340.

== Demographics ==
As per the 2011 census of India, Pathariya has a population of 6,349 – of which 3,201 are males and 3,148 are females.

== Place of interest ==
Madku Temple is an ancient temple on an island in the middle of the Shivnath river near Pathariya. This temple is very important from the point of view of astrology. A fair is organized here, in which people from all over the state participate.

== Transport ==
The Raipur–Bilaspur Highway passes through Pathariya, and a major road connects it to Mungeli. Daily bus service available in the town, connecting to nearby major cities and towns.

== See also ==
- Mungeli District
- Sargaon
