= Mungeli district =

Coordinates: 22.0670°N 81.6700°E

- District of Chhattisgarh
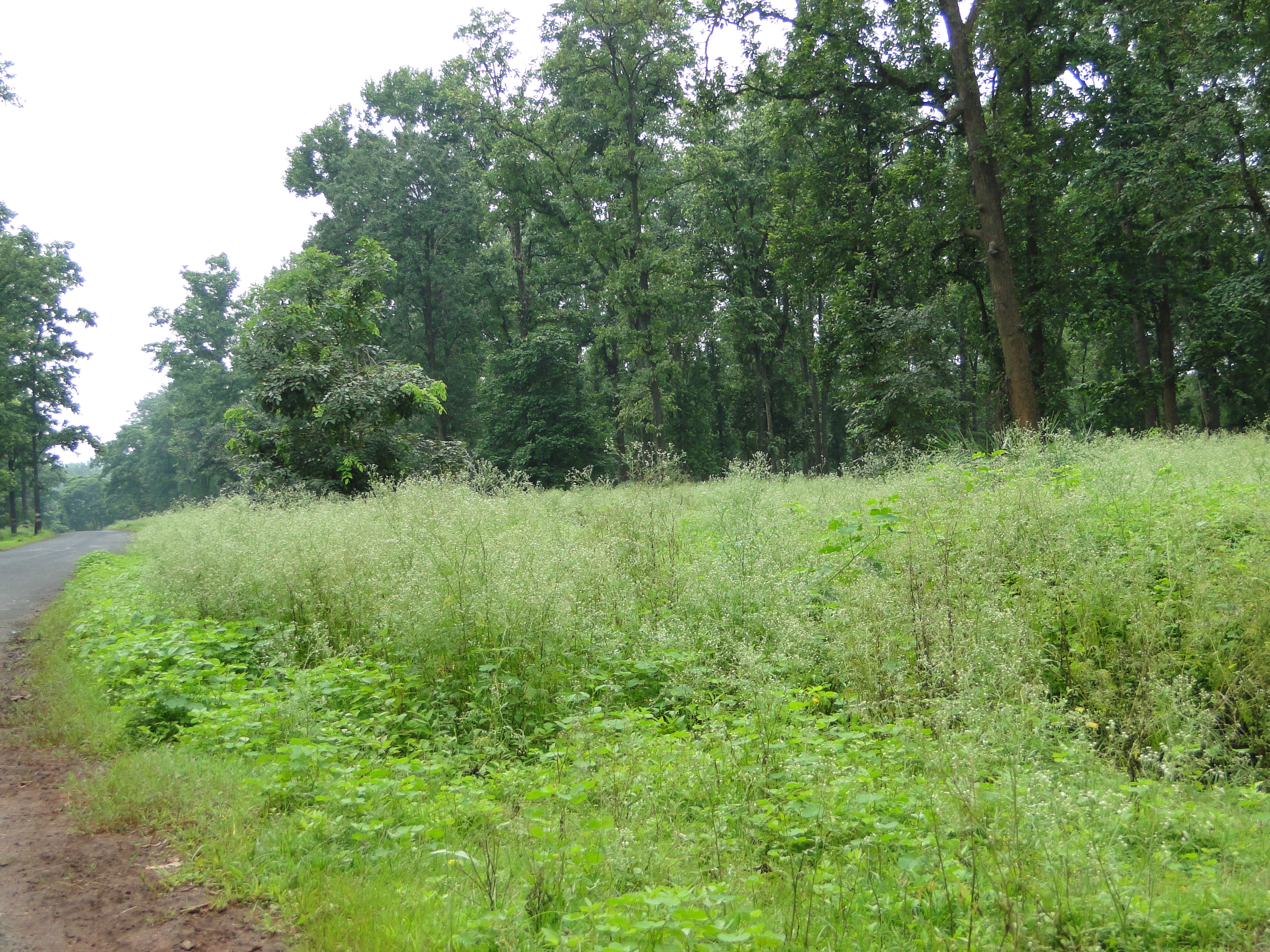
- View of Achanakmar Wildlife Sanctuary

- Location in Chhattisgarh
- Country: India
- State: Chhattisgarh
- Division: Bilaspur
- Established: 1 January 2012
- Headquarters: Mungeli
- Tehsils: Mungeli, Lormi, Pathariya, Sargaon, Lalpur Thana

Government
  - Collector: Kundan Kumar
  - Lok Sabha Constituency: Bilaspur
  - Vidhan Sabha Constituency: Mungeli, Lormi

Area
  - Total: 2,750.36 km^{2} (1,061.92 sq mi)

Population
  - Total: 701,707
  - Density: 255.133/km^{2} (660.791/sq mi)
- Time zone: UTC+05:30 (IST)
- ISO 3166 code: IN-CT
- HDI: ▲0.716 (medium)
- Literacy rate: 85.7%
- Official languages: Hindi, Chhattisgarhi
- Website: mungeli.gov.in/en/

Mungeli district is a district of Chhattisgarh, India, with its headquarters in Mungeli. It was carved out of Bilaspur district in 2013.

== History ==
Mungeli received the status of a tehsil in 1860. After 142 years, it became a district. The new created district comprised the three tehsils of Mungeli, Patharia and Lormi. It was established as a district in January 2012 after being separated from Bilaspur district.

== Popular in media ==
The story of Netflix film Chaman Bahaar is set in Mungeli district. The story revolves around a young man who runs a paan thela on a semi-deserted road, after the formation of Mungeli district from Bilaspur district. Actor Jitendra Kumar plays the lead role.

== Administrative division ==
Mungeli District has five tehsils:

- Mungeli
- Lormi
- Pathariya
- Sargaon
- Lalpur Thana

There are two assembly's to lead the district in the state assembly.

- Mungeli Assembly constituency
- Lormi Assembly constituency

== Demographics ==
Religions in Mungeli district (2011)
Religion	Percent
Hinduism	97.01%
Other (tribal religion)	1.41%
Islam	0.82%
Christianity	0.50%
Other or not stated	0.26%

As of the 2011 census, the population was 701,707, of which 65,439 (9.33%) live in urban areas. The population growth rate over the decade 2001-2011 was 38.29%. 1,20,631 (17.19%) are under 6 years of age. Mungeli has a sex ratio of 974 females per 1000 males and a literacy rate of 64.75%. Scheduled Castes and Scheduled Tribes make up 27.70% and 10.37% of the population respectively.

Languages of Mungeli district (2011)
1. Chhattisgarhi (97.2%)
2. Hindi (1.45%)
3. Gondi (0.17%)
4. Sindhi (0.15%)
5. Kurukh (0.13%)
6. Others (0.85%)

As of the 2011 census, 97.25% of the population spoke Chhattisgarhi and 1.45% Hindi as their first language.

== Places of interest ==
- Achanakmar Tiger Reserve
- Setganga
- Kharaghat
- Rajiv Gandhi reservoir (Khudia reservoir)
- Madku Islands
- Amar Island and Temple
- Hathnikala Temple
- Shivghat
