= Pathariya, Bhopal =

Pathariya
- village
- Location within Madhya Pradesh Location within India
- Coordinates: 23.6808489°N 77.3812494°E
- Country: India
- State: Madhya Pradesh
- District: Bhopal
- Tehsil: Berasia
- Elevation: 501 m (1,644 ft)

Population (2011)
  - Total: 191
- Time zone: UTC+5:30 (IST)
- ISO 3166 code: MP-IN
- 2011 census code: 482220

Pathariya is a village in the Bhopal district of Madhya Pradesh, India. It is located in the Berasia tehsil.

== Demographics ==
According to the 2011 census of India, Pathariya has 46 households. The effective literacy rate (i.e. the literacy rate of population excluding children aged 6 and below) is 41.61%.

Demographics (2011 Census)
	Total	Male	Female
Population	191	99	92
Children aged below 6 years	42	22	20
Scheduled caste	15	11	4
Scheduled tribe	0	0	0
Literates	62	38	24
Workers (all)	105	57	48
Main workers (total)	75	50	25
Main workers: Cultivators	57	41	16
Main workers: Agricultural labourers	17	8	9
Main workers: Household industry workers	0	0	0
Main workers: Other	1	1	0
Marginal workers (total)	30	7	23
Marginal workers: Cultivators	20	4	16
Marginal workers: Agricultural labourers	10	3	7
Marginal workers: Household industry workers	0	0	0
Marginal workers: Others	0	0	0
Non-workers	86	42	44
