= Chaman Bahaar =

2020 Hindi movie

- Film poster
- Directed by: Apurva Dhar Badgaiyann
- Written by: Apurva Dhar Badgaiyann
- Produced by: Siddharth Anand Kumar; Vikram Mehra
- Starring: Jitendra Kumar; Ritika Badiani; Bhuvan Arora; Dhirendra Tiwari; Alam Khan
- Cinematography: Arkodeb Mukherjee
- Edited by: Ujjwal Chandra
- Music by: Songs: Anshuman Mukherjee; Amit Pradhan; Score: Mangesh Dhakde
- Production companies: Saregama India; Yoodlee films
- Distributed by: Netflix
- Release date: 19 June 2020
- Running time: 111 minutes
- Country: India
- Language: Hindi

Chaman Bahaar is a 2020 Indian Hindi-language drama film written and directed by Apurva Dhar Badgaiyann. The film is produced by Yoodlee Films, a production venture of Saregama India. It stars Jitendra Kumar and Ritika Badiani. The movie revolves around a small town panwalla who falls in love with a schoolgirl who lives opposite his shop before even meeting her. Chaman Bahaar released on Netflix on 19 June 2020 and is set in the town of Lormi in Indian state Chhattisgarh.

== Plot ==
The film is set in the small town of Lormi in Chhattisgarh and follows Prem Kumar Yadav, commonly known as Billu, a young man who runs a paan shop called Chaman Bahaar. Billu had previously worked as a forest guard but left the job after a frightening encounter with a bear. He subsequently buys the paan shop from his friend Dinesh, expecting it to become a successful business. However, the shop initially receives very few customers after the district headquarters is moved from Lormi to Mungeli, diverting most of the traffic away from the road.

Billu's fortunes change when a government sub-engineer moves into a house directly opposite his shop with his family. His teenage daughter, Rinku, soon attracts the attention of numerous young men in the locality. The boys begin gathering outside Billu's shop to watch her whenever she leaves or returns home. Their presence turns the previously unsuccessful shop into a busy meeting place, causing Billu's business to prosper. Billu himself becomes infatuated with Rinku, despite never having spoken to her, and begins imagining that her ordinary gestures are signs of affection towards him.

As Rinku's presence attracts increasing attention, local youths and rival groups become involved. Somu and Chhotu, two young men who frequent Billu's shop, inform the local strongman Ashu about Rinku. Ashu subsequently establishes a carrom club at the shop, using it as a gathering place while keeping another local politician, Shiladitya "Shila" Tiwari, from interfering. Billu, meanwhile, becomes increasingly obsessed with Rinku and eventually decides to express his feelings by giving her a card.

Billu attempts to give the card to Rinku but loses his courage. Later, after seeing her outside her house, he throws the card towards her home. The card is discovered by Rinku's father, who questions Billu about it. Fearing confrontation, Billu denies writing the card and claims that some boys on a motorcycle threw it. Rinku's father asks police inspector Bhadauria to investigate. Bhadauria subsequently assaults Billu and forces him to apologize for allowing groups of young men to gather outside his shop and ogle at Rinku. Billu is humiliated in front of Rinku and becomes increasingly frustrated.

Billu's father attempts to arrange his marriage, but Billu remains preoccupied with Rinku. In his anger and disappointment, he begins writing insulting messages about her around the town and on currency notes. When a local trader complains, Bhadauria confronts Billu again, beats him and destroys his shop. Billu is arrested, while Shila uses the incident as a political issue, accusing the police of brutality and demanding Bhadauria's transfer.

Rinku's father, sympathetic to Billu's situation and his damaged livelihood, helps secure his release. After leaving custody, Billu visits Rinku's family. Her parents apologize for what happened and tell him that they are leaving Lormi and returning to Bilaspur. Billu gives Rinku's father chocolates that he had bought for her and leaves without ever having established a relationship with Rinku.

Shila's supporters subsequently restore Billu's shop, but his business declines again after Rinku and her family leave the town. Some weeks later, another family moves into the house opposite the shop, and Billu notices that the new arrival has once again attracted the attention of local young men.

== Cast ==
- Jitendra Kumar as Prem Kumar Yadav (Billu)
- Ritika Badiani as Rinku Nanoriya
- Bhuvan Arora as Sushant Tiwari Vijay (Somu)
- Alam Khan as Shiladitya Tiwari aka Shila Bhaiya
- Dhirendra Tiwari as Mudit Mohan Shukla (Chotu)
- Ashwani Kumar as Ashu
- Yashwant Anand as Dinesh
- Mizan Khan as Vitesh
- Bhagwan Tiwari as Bhadauria
- Gyanendra Tripathi as Vishal Sir
- Shiv Dev Singh as Baba
- Neeraj Uke as Thakur
- Anil Sharma as Engineer
- Kaushal Kumar Upadhyay as Shopkeeper

== Soundtrack ==
Chaman Bahaar

Soundtrack album by Anshuman Mukherjee and Amit Pradhan
- Released: 19 June 2020
- Recorded: 2019
- Genre: Feature film soundtrack
- Length: 18:56
- Language: Hindi
- Label: Saregama Music
External audio
- Official Audio Jukebox on YouTube

The film's music was composed by Anshuman Mukherjee and Anuj Garg with lyrics written by Badgaiyann and Amit Prathan.

Track listing
No.	Title	Singer(s)	Length
1.	"Do Ka Chaar"	Sonu Nigam	3:44
2.	"Kaand"	Mohan Kannan	3:50
3.	"Dhun Dhun" (Also Music & Lyrics by Amit Prathan)	Romy	3:20
4.	"Gupchup"	Vibha Saraf	2:09
5.	"Billu’s Theme"	Sunil Soni	2:51
6.	"Koi Nahi"	Brijesh Shandilya, Anisha Saikia	3:02
Total length:			18:56
