= Pathamari =

Coordinates: 26°25′N 88°2′E

Pathabhari पाठामारी
- Village development committee
- Interactive map of Pathabhari
- Country: Nepal
- Province: Koshi Province
- District: Jhapa District

Population (1991)
  - Total: 3,439
- Time zone: UTC+5:45 (Nepal Time)

Pathabhari is a village development committee in Jhapa District in the Koshi Province of south-eastern Nepal. At the time of the 1991 Nepal census it had a population of 3439 people living in 709 individual households.
