= Gherabari =

Gherabari N/A
- Nickname: N/A
- Motto: N/A
- Location in Nepal
- Coordinates: 26.44°N 87.94°E
- Country: Nepal
- Province: Koshi Province
- District: Jhapa District

Population (1991)
  - Total: 6,049
- Time zone: UTC+5:45 (Nepal Time)

Gherabari ] in Jhapa District in the Koshi Province of south-eastern Nepal. At the time of the 1991 Nepal census it had a population of 6049 people living in 1174 individual households. Word member Sri Ranjti Kumar Limbu, spoken language Nepali Rajbanshi,Surjapuri language
