= Baniyani =

- Village Development Committee
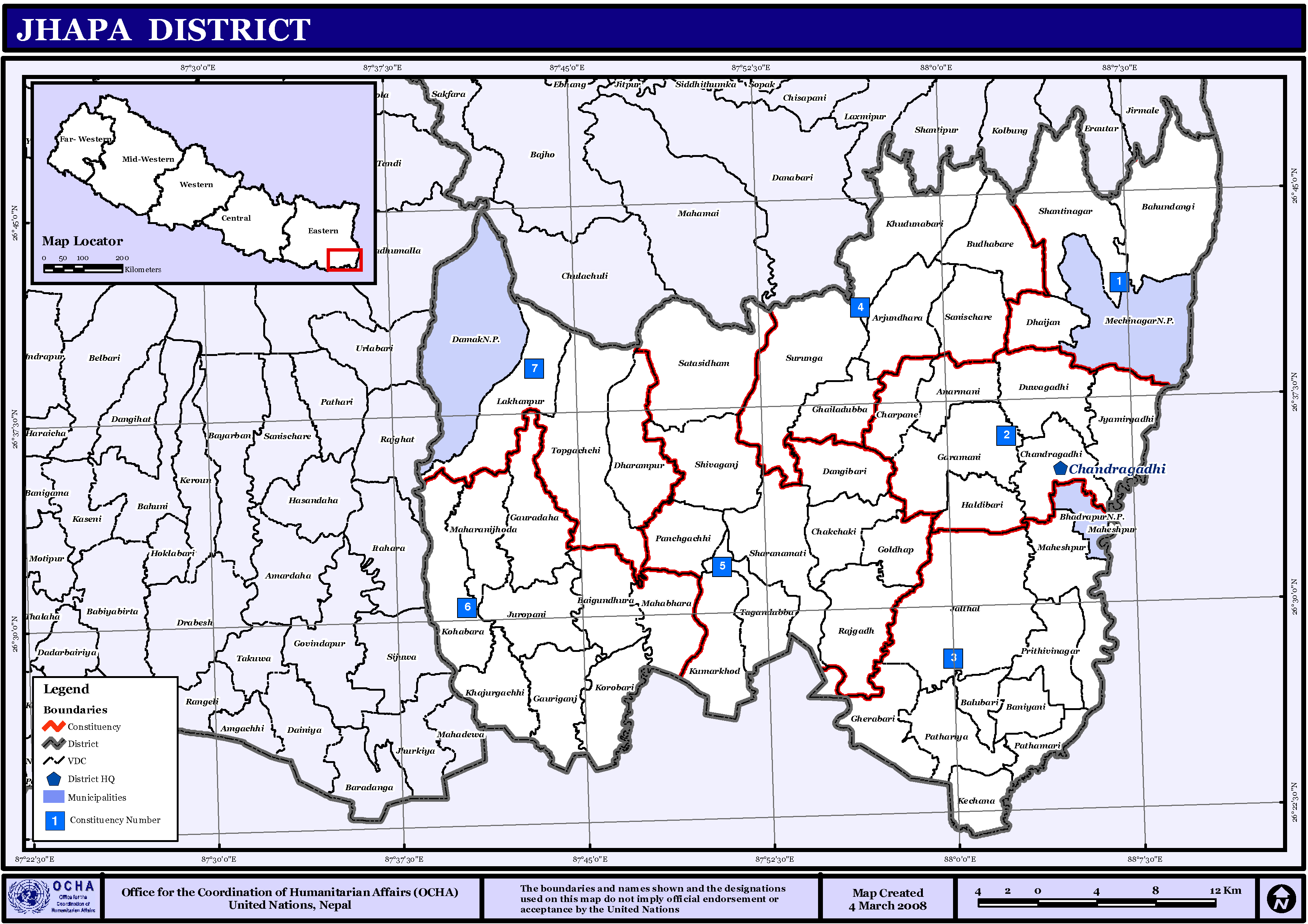
- Map of the Village Development Committees in Jhapa District

- Location in Nepal
- Country: Nepal
- Province: Province No. 1
- District: Jhapa District

Population (1991)
  - Total: 5,043
- Time zone: UTC+5:45 (Nepal Time)

Baniyani (Nepali: बनियानी) is a Village Development Committee in Jhapa District in the Province No. 1 of south-eastern Nepal. At the time of the 1991 Nepal census it had a population of 5043 people residing in 985 individual households. Laxmi Higher Secondary School, Baniyani Health-Post, and an Armed-Force Camp are located in the vicinity. Mechi River flows to the east on the border of Nepal and India.

== Demographics ==
Many ethnic groups live in the region, such as: Rai, Newar, Tamang, Limbu, Meche, Koche, Rajbanshi, Gangain, Muslim, Gaine, Chaudhary, Bahun, Chetri, Santhal.

== See also ==
- very famous santhal dance
- Raj Misthan bhandar, Rajkumar dai julabi just wow.
- nepali famous singer also from there PRAMOD KHAREL, HIMAL SAGAR, SURESH ADHIKARI
- Laxmi secondary school,
- Baniyani bazaar, Hukahuki chowk.
