= Kechana =

Kechana केचना
- Village development committee
- Location in Nepal
- Coordinates: 26.38°N 88.01°E
- Country: Nepal
- Province: Koshi_Province
- District: Jhapa District

Population (1991)
  - Total: 4,420
- Time zone: UTC+5:45 (Nepal Time)

Kechana is a village development committee in Jhapa District in the Koshi Province of south-eastern Nepal. At the time of the 1991 Nepal census it had a population of 4420 people living in 948 individual households.
