= Lormi =

- Town
- Location in Chhattisgarh, India Lormi (India)
- Coordinates: 22.28°N 81.73°E
- Country: India
- State: Chhattisgarh
- District: Mungeli
- Established: 1768

Government
  - Type: Mayor-Council
  - Body: Lormi Nagar Palika
  - MLA: Arun Sao (BJP)

Area
  - Total: 300 km^{2} (120 sq mi)
- Elevation: 315 m (1,033 ft)

Population (2011)
  - Total: 45,156
  - Density: 150/km^{2} (390/sq mi)

Languages
  - Official: Hindi, Chhattisgarhi,
- Time zone: UTC+5:30 (IST)
- PIN: 495115
- Telephone code: 07756
- Vehicle registration: CG 28

Lormi is a town, and a municipality, and tehsil in Mungeli district in the Indian state of Chhattisgarh.

== Geography ==
Lormi is located at 22.28°N 81.73°E. It has an average elevation of 315 metres (1033 feet).

== Demographics ==
As of 2001 India census, Lormi had a population of 12,158. Males constitute 52% of the population and females 48%. Lormi had an average literacy rate of 63%, higher than the national average of 59.5%. Male literacy is 73%, while female literacy was 52%. In Lormi, 15% of the population was under 6 years of age.

== In popular culture ==
- The story of the 2020 Hindi-language Netflix drama film Chaman Bahaar is set in Lormi.

== Governance ==
Lormi is one of the 90 Legislative Assembly constituencies of Chhattisgarh state in India. It is part of Mungeli district. Arun Sao has represented the Lormi constituency in the Chattisgarh Legislative Assembly since 2023. He is also a Deputy Chief Minister of Chattisgarh.
