= Mungeli =

- City
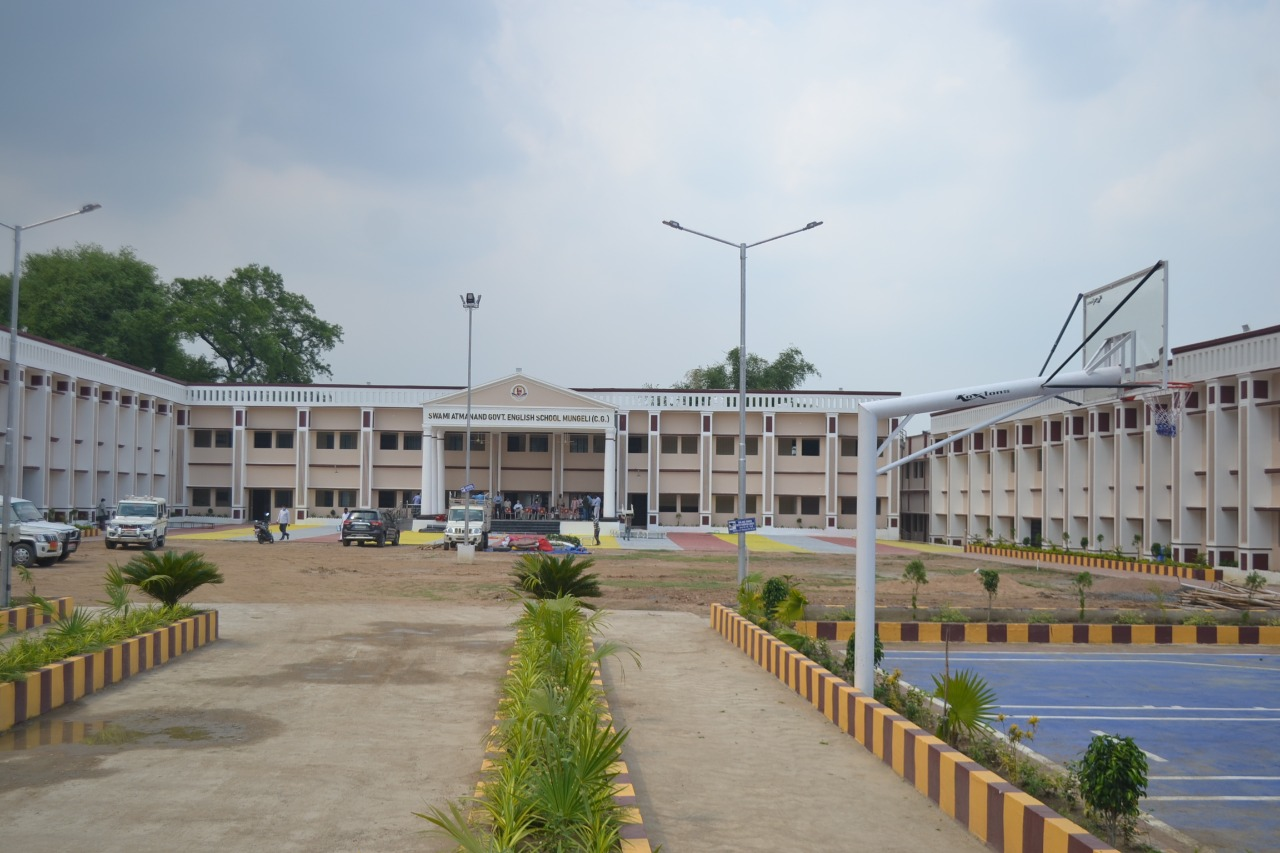
- Swami Atmanand Government School, Mungeli

- Location in Chhattisgarh, India Mungeli (India)
- Coordinates: 22.07°N 81.68°E
- Country: India
- State: Chhattisgarh
- District: Mungeli

Government
  - Type: Mayor-Council
  - Body: Mungeli Municipal Corporation
  - Mayor: Rohit Shukla
  - MLA: Punnulal Mohle (BJP)
- Elevation: 288 m (945 ft)

Population (2001)
  - Total: 108,387

Languages
  - Official: Hindi, Chhattisgarhi
- Time zone: UTC+5:30 (IST)
- PIN: 495334 (Mungeli)
- Telephone code: 917755
- Vehicle registration: CG-28
- Website: http://cg.nic.in/mungeli

Mungeli is a city and a Municipal Council in Mungeli district in the Indian state of Chhattisgarh. The pin code of Mungeli is 495334.

== Demographics ==
As of 2001 India census, Mungeli had a population of 108,387.

== Notable people ==
- Arun Sao, Deputy Chief Minister of Chhattisgarh
- Tokhan Sahu, Minister of State for Housing and Urban Affairs of India
- Punnulal Mohle, former cabinet minister of Chhattisgarh and four time Member of Parliament from Bilaspur Lok Sabha seat
- Lakhan Lal Sahu, Indian Politician
- Sandeep Pathak, Member of Rajya Sabha
